= List of tallest buildings in Toronto =

Skyline of Toronto
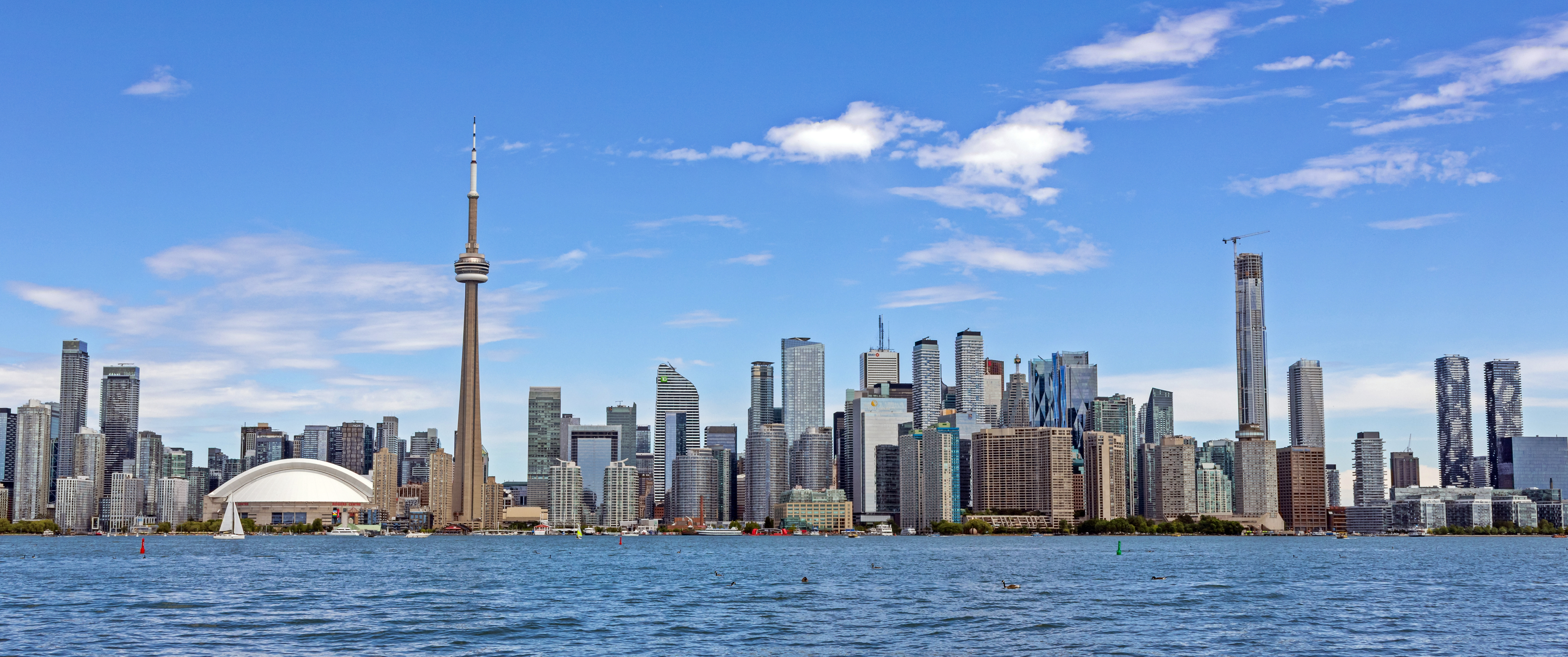
- View of Downtown Toronto in 2026
- Tallest building: SkyTower at Pinnacle One Yonge (2026)
- Tallest building height: 351.8 m (1,154 ft)
- Tallest structure: CN Tower (1976)
- Tallest structure height: 553.3 m (1,815 ft)
- Major clusters: Downtown Toronto; Humber Bay; Yonge–Eglinton; North York City Centre
- First 150 m+ building: TD Tower (1967)

Number of tall buildings (2026)
- Taller than 100 m (328 ft): 405
- Taller than 150 m (492 ft): 111 + 6 T/O
- Taller than 200 m (656 ft): 32 + 2 T/O
- Taller than 300 m (984 ft): 2 T/O

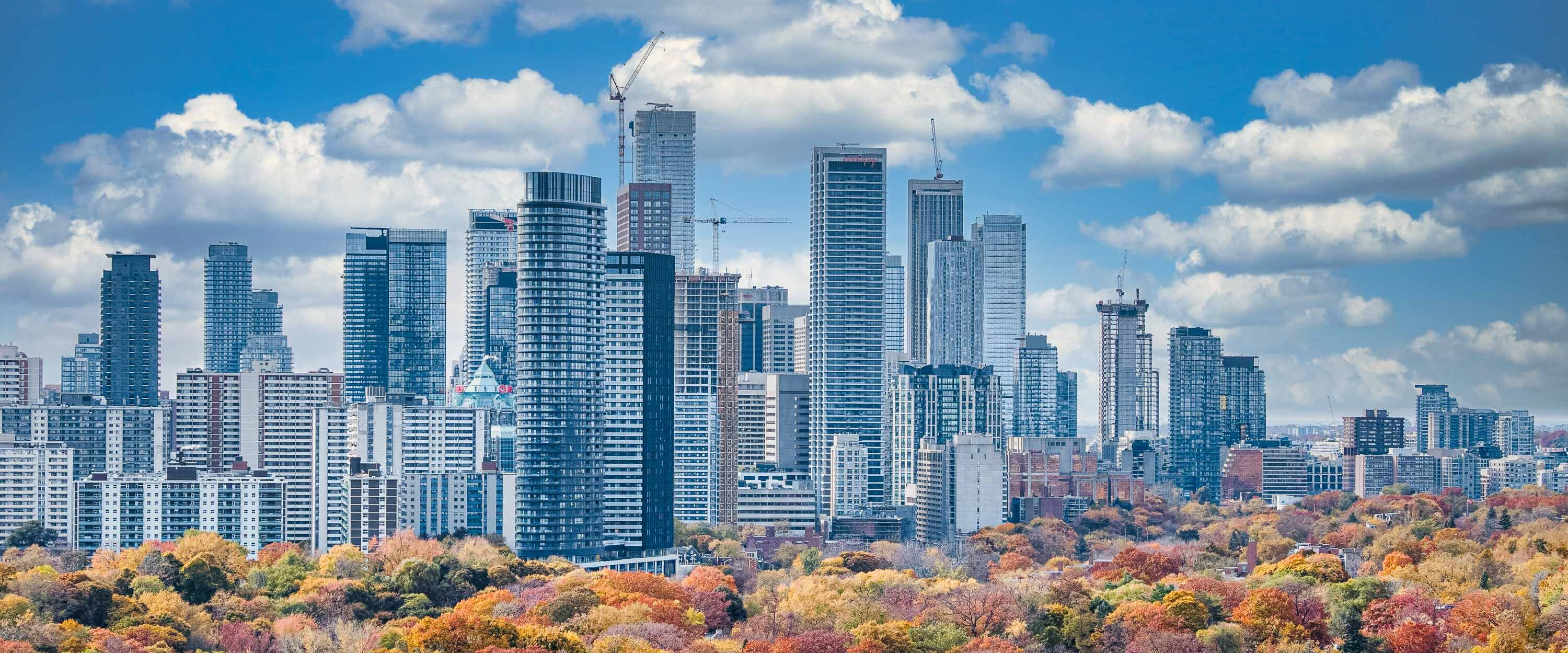
A portion of the downtown skyline in 2024

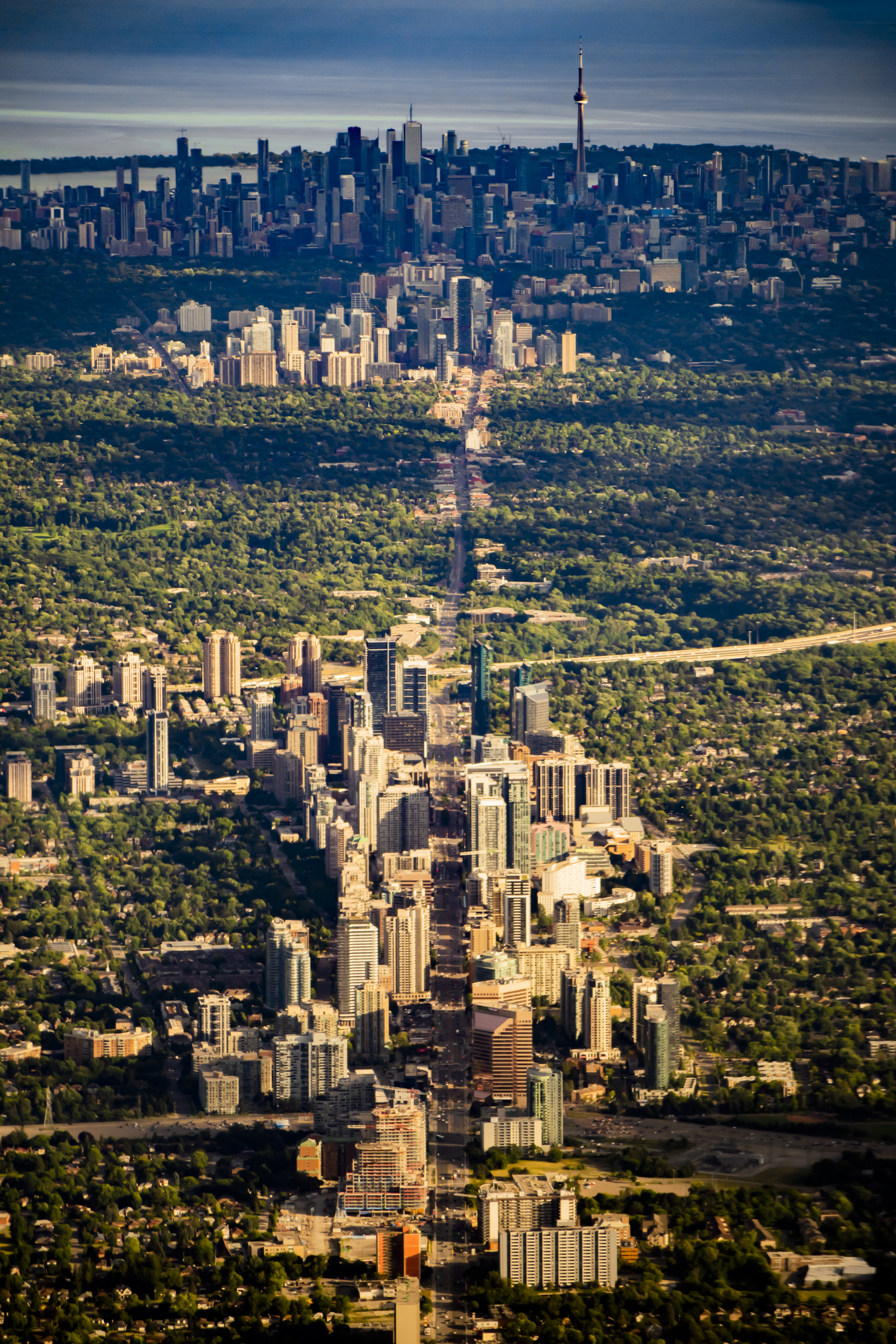
Three of Toronto's main skylines sit along Yonge Street. From front to back: North York City Centre, Yonge–Eglinton, and downtown.

Toronto is the largest city in Canada, with a metropolitan area population of just over 7.1 million (2026). Eight of Toronto's tallest buildings are also the tallest in all of Canada. Toronto has one of the largest skylines in the world, with 111 completed skyscrapers taller than 150 m (492 ft) as of 2026, 34 of which have a height greater than 200 m (656 ft). It is the third largest skyline in North America, after New York City and Chicago. The city's tallest building since late 2025 has been SkyTower at Pinnacle One Yonge, which rises 351.8 metres (1,154 ft) tall. It is also the tallest building in Canada. However, the tallest free-standing structure in the city is the 553.3 m (1,815 ft) CN Tower, which was the tallest free-standing structure in the world from 1975 until 2007, and remains the most prominent landmark on Toronto's skyline.

The history of skyscrapers in Toronto began in 1894 with the construction of the Beard Building, which is often regarded as the first skyscraper in the city. Toronto went through its first building boom in the late 1920s and early 1930s, increasing the number of tall buildings in the city. Following the Great Depression, there was a great lull in high-rise construction for over 30 years. A second, larger building boom began in the 1960s, which saw the construction of many recognizable commercial skyscrapers, such as the TD Bank Tower and Commerce Court West in 1973, the aforementioned First Canadian Place, and the postmodernist skyscrapers of Scotia Plaza and TD Canada Trust Tower towards the end of the boom.

A third, much larger high-rise construction boom emerged in the mid-2000s and has continued to the present, dramatically expanding and reshaping Toronto's skyline; of the skyscrapers taller than 150 m (492 ft), only 11—less than one ninth—were built before the 21st century. Unlike the previous two booms, most of Toronto's recent high-rise development has been in residential and mixed-use buildings. The rate of construction accelerated further in the 2010s and 2020s, with the completion of Toronto's tallest mixed-use building, The St. Regis Toronto, in 2012, and its tallest fully residential building, Aura, in 2014. The boom's extent has led it to be described as an example of Manhattanization. As of 2026, there are over 15 further skyscrapers under construction, three of which being supertall skyscrapers that will overtake First Canadian Place in height. The tallest is SkyTower at Pinnacle One Yonge, which will rise to 351.8 m (1,154 ft), followed by The One at 308.6 m (1,012 ft), and Concord Sky at 300.2 m (985 ft).

While most of Toronto's skyscrapers are located in Downtown Toronto, there are significant skyscraper clusters in Yonge–Eglinton as well as in North York City Centre to the north of downtown, Scarborough City Centre to the east, and in Humber Bay to the west. Downtown, Yonge–Eglinton, and North York all sit along Yonge Street, a major arterial. Smaller clusters of high-rises, such as in Yonge-St.Clair and Islington-City Centre West, can be found across the city. In the Greater Toronto Area, large skyscraper clusters are developing in Mississauga and Vaughan. The Toronto skyline, especially the CN Tower, can be spotted by the naked eye during clear daylight skies from locations as far as Newmarket from the north, Clarington from the east, several points along the Niagara Escarpment from the west, and Fort Niagara State Park in the south across Lake Ontario in the U.S. state of New York.

== History ==
Number of buildings by height in Toronto by the end of each year, based on the information in this article. Click on the legend to toggle a specific height on or off. View chart definition.

=== 1890s–1950s ===
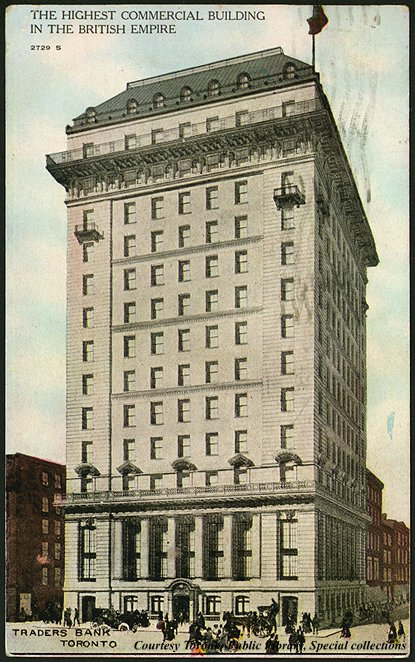
Trader's Bank Building is one of Toronto's earliest tall buildings to survive until today

Toronto's population grew rapidly in the late 19th century, reaching 181,000 in 1891. The first "skyscraper" in Toronto is often considered to be the Beard Building. The seven-storey building was constructed in 1894 to a wood-brick combination design by E. J. Lennox, one of Toronto's most prominent and sought-after architects at the time. However, the similarly tall Toronto Board of Trade Building was completed two years prior in 1892; the Board of Trade wanted to build a skyscraper like those in New York City, Chicago and Boston, and they favoured an American architect over Canadian-based ones, supposedly on the basis of experience with tall buildings. In 1895, the Temple Building would be the first building in Toronto to breach the ten-storey mark. Housing the headquarters of the Independent Order of Foresters, a friendly society and financial institution, the Romanesque Revival building also looked to Chicago's early skyscrapers for inspiration. All three of the aforementioned buildings were demolished during the 20th century. While not a high-rise building, the Toronto's city hall, now the Old City Hall, was completed in 1899, featuring a prominent 103.6 m (340 ft) clock tower. Old City Hall was designed by E. J. Lennox in the Richardsonian Romanesque style and officially opened in 1899.

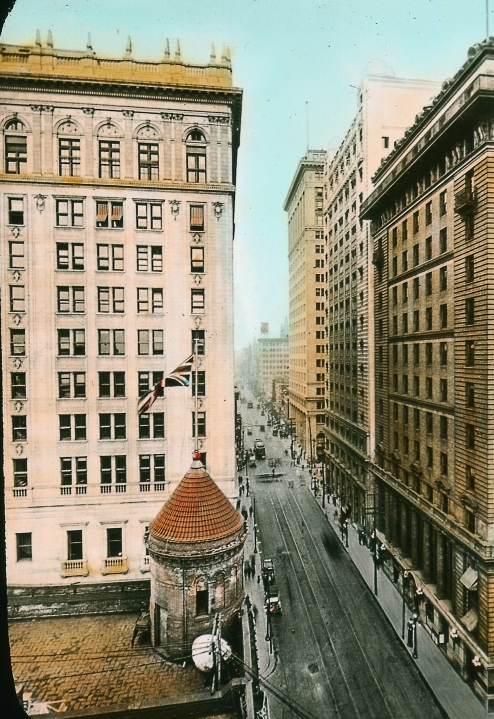
The intersection of King and Yonge streets was surrounded by many of Toronto's first high-rises

The Great Fire of Toronto in 1904 destroyed a large section of downtown, but the city was quickly rebuilt. The intersection of King and Yonge streets became a site for some of Toronto's first skyscrapers. In 1906, the Trader's Bank Building was completed. At 55.4 m (182 ft) and 15 storeys, it was the tallest building in the city, in Canada, and in the British Commonwealth until the Royal Liver Building was completed in 1911. The building was innovative in its leasing arrangements; it was the first major Toronto building to introduce the New York system of leasing by the square foot. Already the height of new buildings in Toronto were met with controversy, drawing comparisons with New York City's skyline. One editorial in The Globe wrote that "if the skyscraper habit grows, as there is every indication it will... the lower end of Yonge Street and the central portion of King street will become dim sunless canyons such as one sees in the financial centre of New York."

A 61 m (200 ft) height limit was introduced in 1907, which was short-lived, as the even taller Canadian Pacific Building was built in 1913, retaking the title as the tallest building in the Commonwealth. It served as the headquarters for the Canadian Pacific Railway, which "was enjoying its greatest period of prosperity" and wanted to incorporate its offices into a single location. Its design has been described as Edwardian and Beaux-Arts. The Traders Bank of Canada, for which the Trader's Bank Building was built, would be acquired by the Royal Bank of Canada (RBC) in 1912. The RBC would later build the 89 m (292 ft), 20-storey Royal Bank Building at 8 Elm Street in 1915.

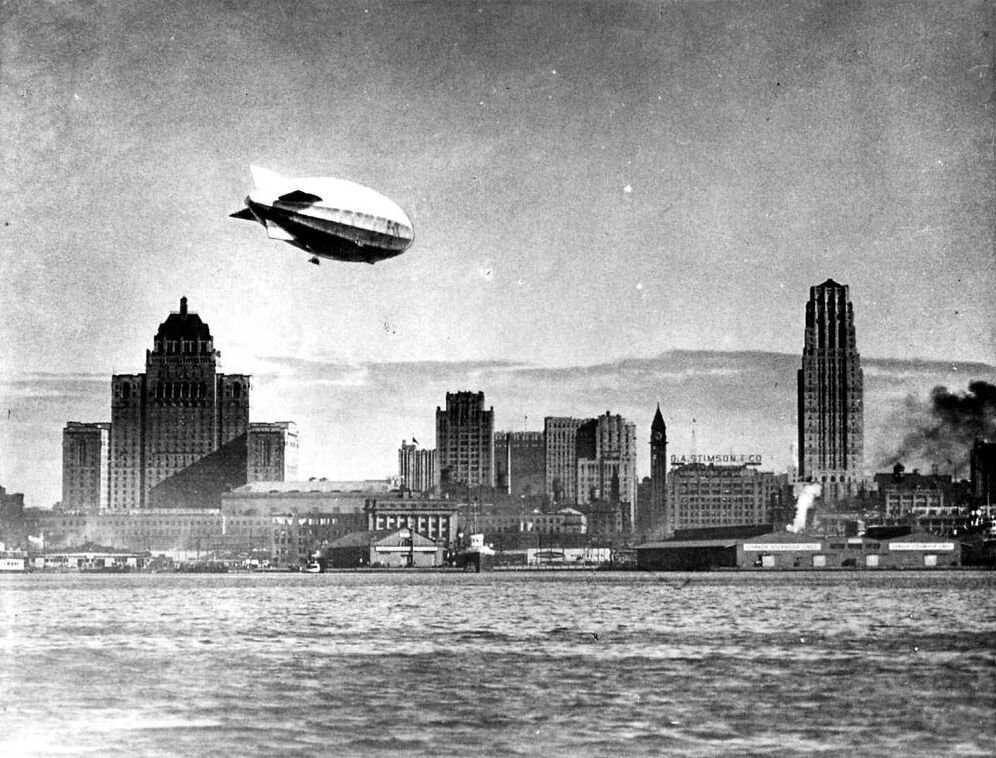
Toronto's skyline in the 1930s was dominated by the Royal York Hotel (left) and Commerce Court North (right)

After a minor slowdown during World War I, Toronto's skyline continued to grow during the 1920s, with construction accelerating at the end of the decade. The architectural style of Art Deco was popular at the time influencing the design of the 21-storey Sterling Tower, which narrowly surpassed the Royal Bank Building at 90 m (295 ft) and 20 storeys as Toronto's tallest building in 1928. It was almost matched by the Old Toronto Star Building, which was the headquarters of the Toronto Star newspaper from 1929 until 1970. Also in 1929, the largest of Canada's grand railway hotels—a series of hotels built by the Canadian Pacific Railway to encourage the use of its rail network—was completed. The Royal York was designed in the Châteauesque style and contained over 1,000 guest rooms. It was 124 m (407 ft) tall, the first building in Toronto to exceed 100 m (328 ft) in height. In 1931, the Royal York was surpassed by the 145 m (476 ft) Commerce Court North, built as the headquarters of the Canadian Bank of Commerce; it is now part of the Commerce Court complex of office buildings. In 1932, a high-rise tower portion was added to Whitney Block. a Government of Ontario office building.

High-rise development stalled in the early 1930s with the onset of the Great Depression, and later, World War II, leaving the skyline virtually unchanged for two decades. The city's growth resumed after the war, and with it, high-rise construction gradually resumed in the 1950s. These buildings stayed well below the height of Royal York and Commerce Court North, which would remain as Toronto's two tallest buildings for 36 years, from 1931 to 1967. Among the most notable of them was the Bank of Nova Scotia Building, which had been planned in 1930, but construction was delayed and shelved until it began in 1947; the building was completed in 1950. Another was the Imperial Oil Building completed in 1957 as the headquarters of Imperial Oil, Canada's largest oil company. Many residential high-rises between 10 and 15 storeys were also completed in the 1950s as part of the "urban renewal" movement, sometimes at a distance from downtown.

=== 1960s–1990s ===
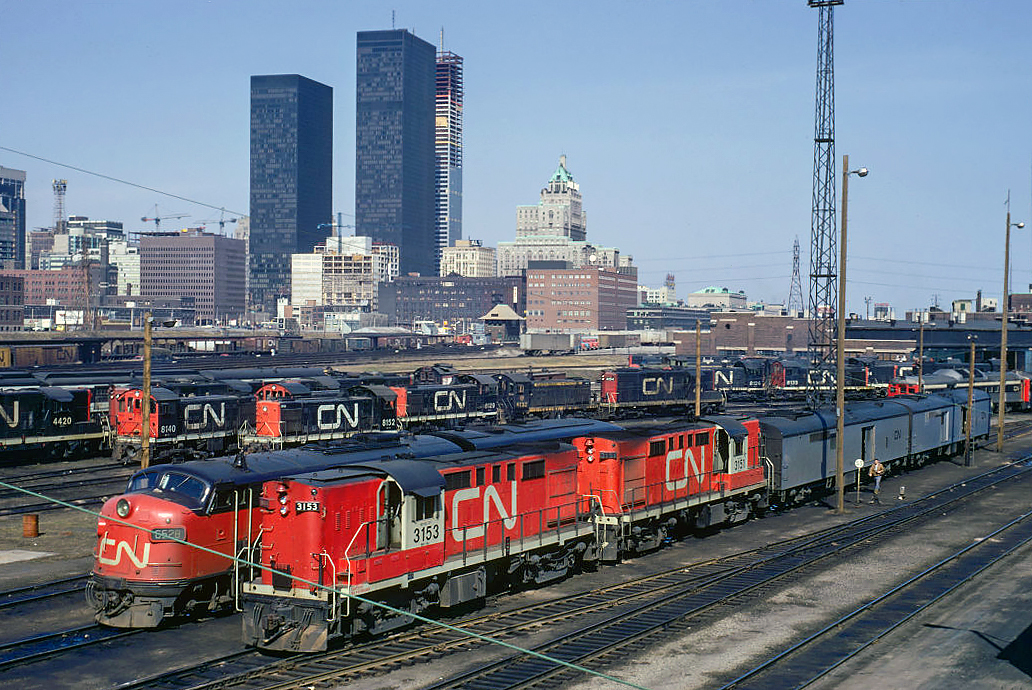
Downtown Toronto in 1971, with the first two towers of the Toronto-Dominion Centre overlooking the Royal York Hotel

Toronto's skyline would change significantly beginning in the 1960s and 1970s, with the downtown core rebuilt with new, taller, skyscrapers, designed in the modern and International styles. The new neo-expressionist Toronto City Hall opened in 1965, consisting of two curved, asymmetric 20-storey towers surrounding a saucer-shaped council chamber amphitheatre. The buildings have become a symbol of the city, referenced in Toronto's city flag since 1974. The most notable landmark towers were built by the largest financial institutions in the country, Canada's "Big Five" banks. The Toronto-Dominion Bank Tower, completed in 1967, not only broke the 150 m (492 ft) limit, but the 200 m (656 ft) limit as well, coming in at a height of 223 m (731 ft) and becoming Toronto and Canada's tallest building. It would be the first building of the eventual Toronto-Dominion Centre, the headquarters of Toronto-Dominion Bank, which now consists of six towers. Designed by famed German-American architect Ludwig Mies van der Rohe, the towers represents the end evolution of Mies's North American period. Like the Seagram Building in New York City, which Mies also designed, the Toronto-Dominion Centre follows the theme of the darkly coloured, steel and glass edifice set in an open plaza. Built alongside the towers was an underground shopping concourse, the first component of Toronto's PATH system that currently links many of Toronto's office skyscrapers.

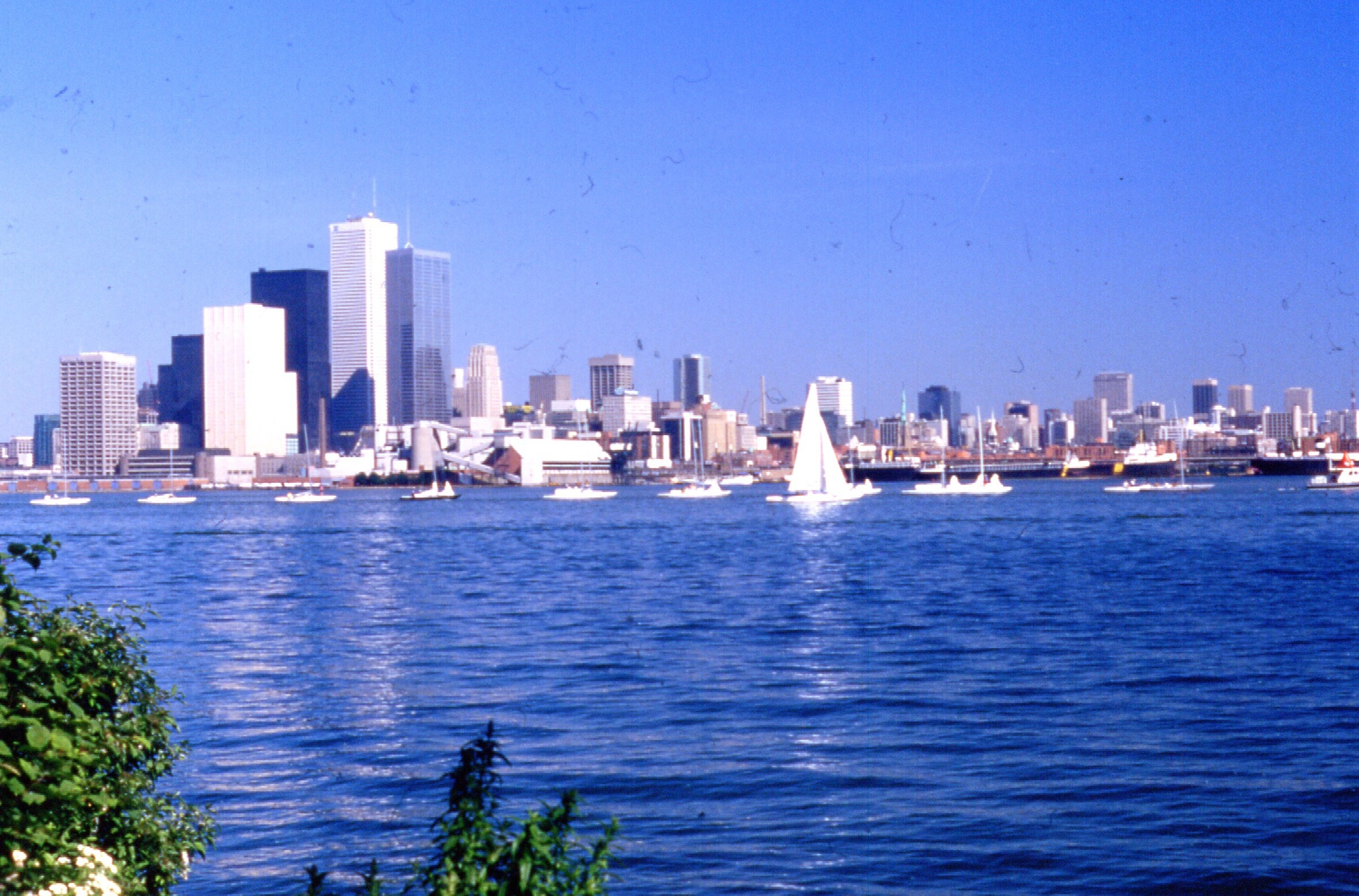
Toronto's skyline in 1973, topped by First Canadian Place, before the CN Tower.

The Canadian Bank of Commerce, which had built Commerce Court North in 1931, merged with Imperial Bank of Canada to become the Canadian Imperial Bank of Commerce (CIBC), now another of the "Big Five" banks. The bank intended to establish a new headquarter complex, and Commerce Court West was erected in 1973, in addition to a shorter eastern high-rise and a southern mid-rise building, forming the Commerce Court complex. Commerce Court West is another International Style edifice with stainless steel and glass curtain walls; at 239 metres (784 ft), it took the title of Toronto and Canada's tallest building. The rapid increase in building height at the time found opposition in Toronto mayor David Crombie, who attempted to impose various height restrictions across downtown, including a 45-foot (13.7 m) height restriction on bylaw development.

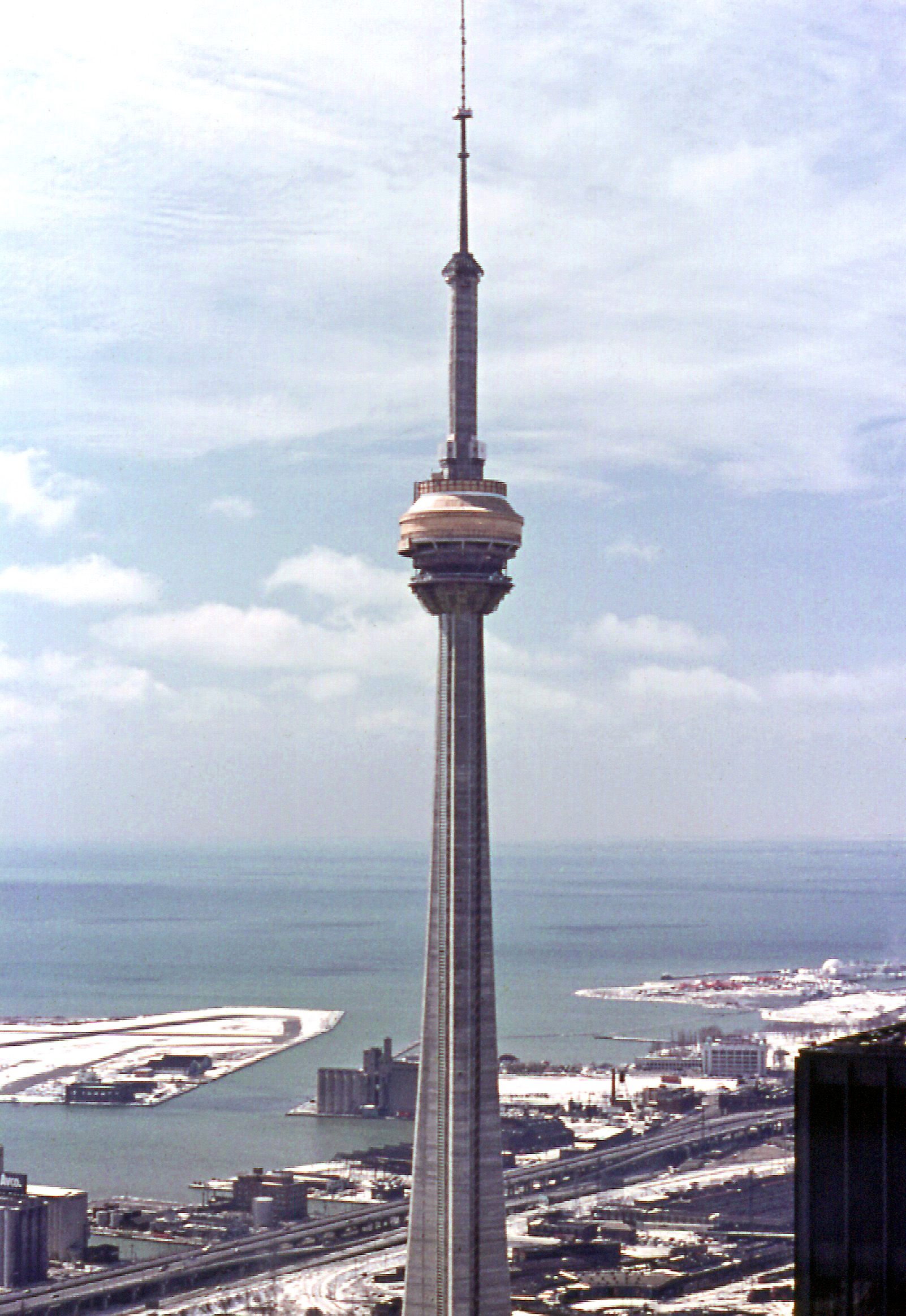
CN Tower in 1975, undergoing interior work

Toronto's tallest building, First Canadian Place, was completed two years later in 1975. The headquarters of another "Big Five" bank, the Bank of Montreal, First Canadian Place is known for its white Carrara marble cladding, which was recladded in white granite between 2009 and 2012. It took the place of the Old Toronto Star Building, with the Toronto Star newspaper, now organized under Torstar, moving to One Yonge Street. At the time of its completion, First Canadian Place was the 8th-tallest building in the world, the tallest outside of New York City and Chicago, and the tallest outside all of the United States. The Bank of Montreal "M-bar" logo at the top of the building was the highest sign in the world until overtaken by the sign atop CITIC Plaza in Guangzhou, China, in 1997. All three of the "Big Five" headquarters—First Canadian Place, Commerce-Court West, and Toronto-Dominion Centre—are located on adjacent blocks in Old Toronto, near the intersection of Bay and King streets. For the rest of the 20th century, they formed the peak of Toronto's high-rise skyline. However, First Canadian Place would be the city's tallest free-standing structure only briefly, as the iconic CN Tower was completed next year.

The idea for the CN Tower was conceived by the Canadian National Railway, which wanted to build a large television and radio communication platform to serve the Toronto area, and to demonstrate the strength of Canadian industry and CN in particular. The reflective nature of the Toronto's new, taller skyscrapers reduced the quality of broadcast signals, requiring higher antennas that were at least 300 m (980 ft) tall. The initial plans for the tower involved three independent cylindrical "pillars" linked by structural bridges, later evolving into the current design of single continuous hexagonal core with three support legs blended into the hexagon below the main level. The tower opened in 1976 with three observation points, the highest of which was Space Deck, now known as The Top. Located southwest of Old Toronto on a disused railway stitching yard, the tower was surrounding by parking lots in the early years after its opening. The CN Tower, perhaps Toronto's most recognizable landmark, was the world's tallest free-standing structure for 32 years, from 1975 until 2007, when it was surpassed by the Burj Khalifa in Dubai.

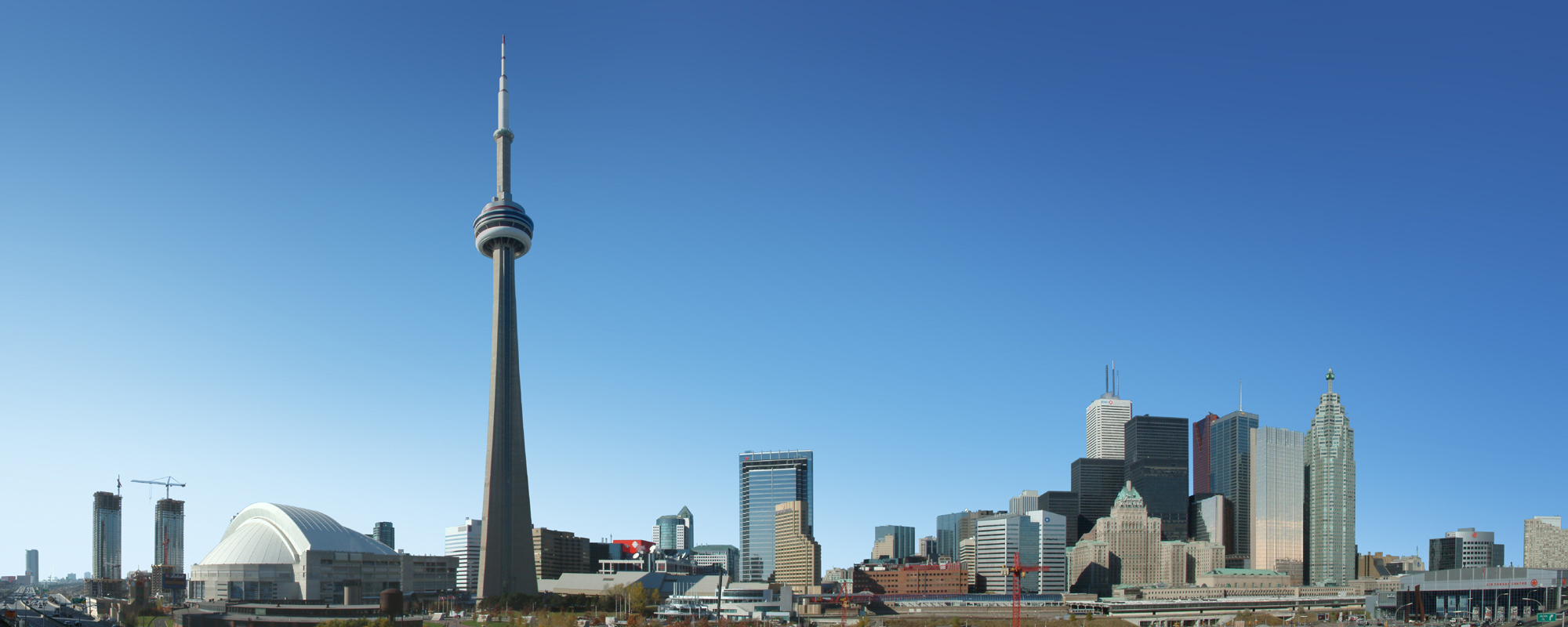
Toronto's skyline in 2004

After the mid-1970s, the pace of the boom slowed considerably but continued onto the early 1990s, culminating with the construction of the city's and Canada's then second and third tallest buildings, Scotia Plaza and the TD Canada Trust Tower. These buildings were designed in the postmodern style that became popular in the 1980s. Built for another Big Five Bank, the Scotiabank, Scotia Plaza is distinctive for its cladding of Red Napoleon granite, which was quarried in Sweden and polished in Italy before being imported to Canada, and its step profile on its upper floors, giving some of them over 12 desirable corner offices. The TD Canada Trust Tower, then simply the Canada Trust Tower, is one of two towers in Brookfield Place, the other being the Bay Wellington Tower. The two skyscrapers share a recessed design on the upper levels, with the Canada Trust Tower sporting a spire. The last major skyscraper of the 20th century was The 250 in 1992, after which there was a lull in skyscraper construction until the mid-2000s. Despite this growth the turn of the millennium, Toronto had only 11 skyscrapers taller than 150 m (492 ft), less than most major American cities.

=== 2000s–present ===
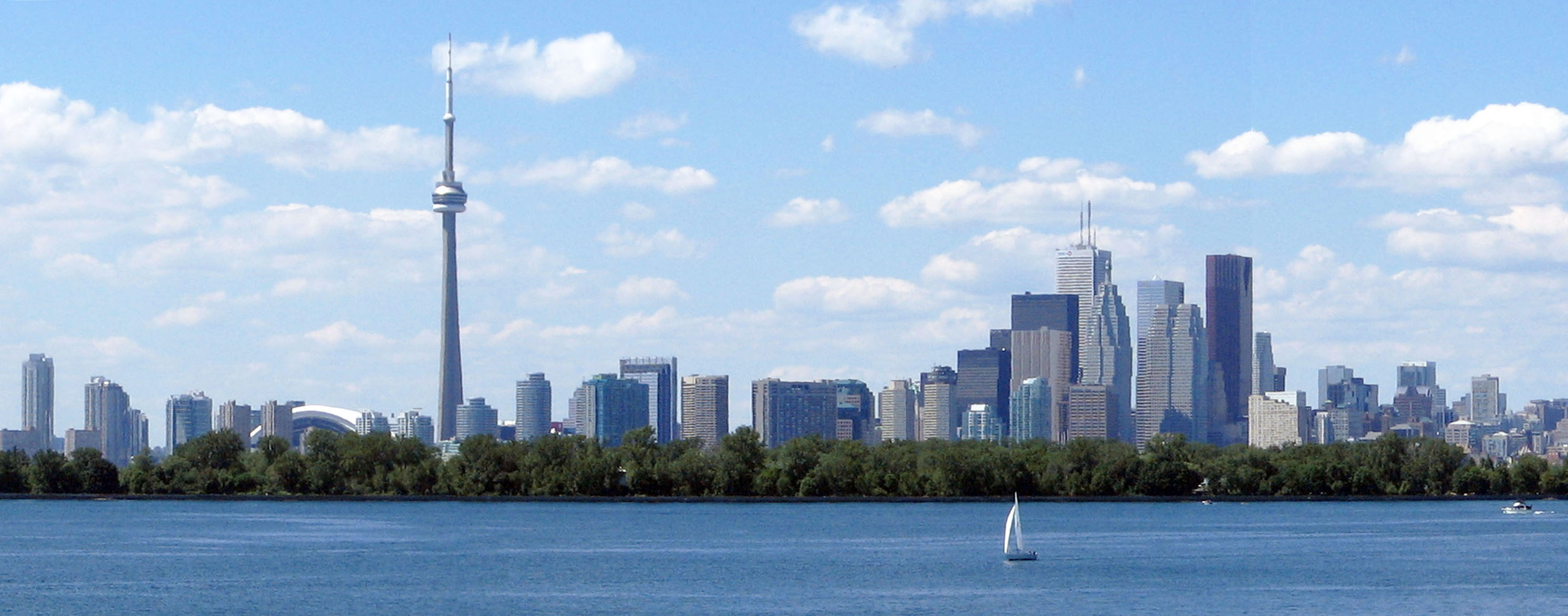
Toronto's skyline in 2008

Toronto's population has continued to grow, driven by immigration and internal migration. From the mid-2000s onwards, the city has been undergoing an unprecedented skyscraper boom, which has since continued unabated. Instead of office skyscrapers, many of the new towers have residential, hotel, or mixed-use functions. The first building taller than 150 m (492 ft) in Toronto in the 21st century was One King West Hotel & Residence in 2005, with residences and a hotel. Other completions in the 2000s included two towers at Residences of College Park (2008) and Montage (2009). Montage is part of the CityPlace neighbourhood, located within the former Railway Lands next to the CN Tower. The area was redeveloped with residential and mixed-use high-rises throughout the 2000s and 2010s.

The final phase of Residences of College Park was Aura, completed in 2014. At 272 m (892 ft), it is Canada's tallest residential skyscraper. Located on Gerrard and Yonge, Aura fills a gap in the downtown skyline between the Financial District to the south, and the emerging towers at Bloor–Yonge to the north. In the core Financial District, the mixed-use, 277 m (908 ft) St. Regis Toronto, then known as Trump International Hotel and Tower Toronto, was finished in 2012, becoming Canada's second tallest building. The pace of construction has led to the common phenomenon of Facadism, the practice of retaining only the facade of a historical building, while new buildings are erected behind or around it, as a compromise between historical preservation and development.

==== An expanding skyline ====
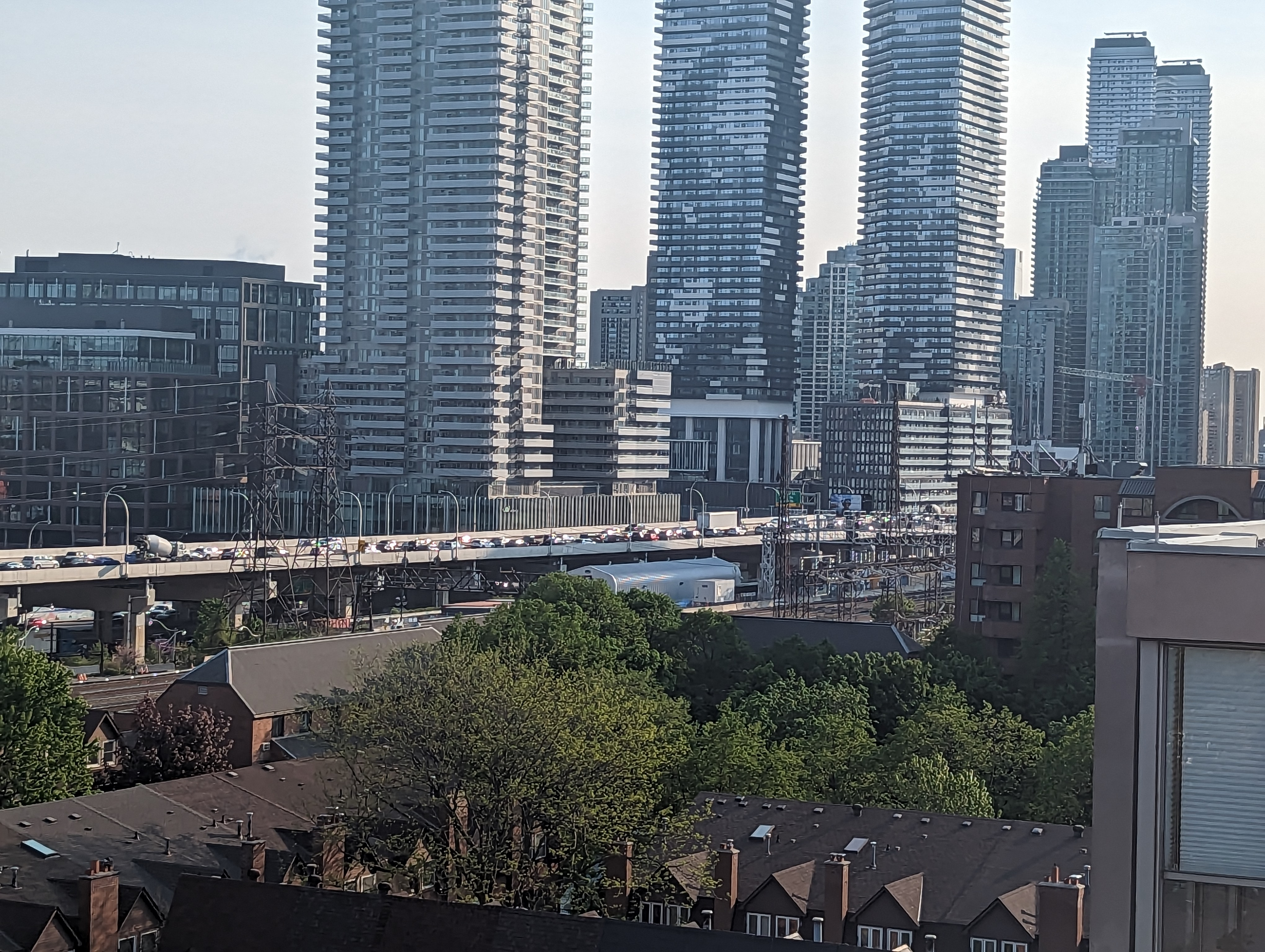
Sugar Wharf and other skyscrapers on the waterfront, towering above Gardiner Expressway

New skyscrapers considerably expanded Toronto's downtown skyline in all directions from the downtown core. Office developments continued with the Bay Adelaide Centre and RBC Centre, both built in 2009. One area that was impacted significantly was the Entertainment District in the west of downtown, with condo additions like the Ritz-Carlton Toronto (2011) and Three Hundred (2014). The Toronto Waterfront Revitalization Corporation, now known as Waterfront Toronto, was established in 2001 to oversee revitalization projects along the Toronto waterfront. Toronto's waterfront was formerly industrial land, with much activity related to Toronto's port. In addition to CityPlace, the city's waterfront was also built up in the Harbourfront and South Core areas south of the Financial District, and in East Bayfront southeast of it. Some notable developments here are Harbour Plaza (2016), Ten York (2018), and the twin Sugar Wharf skyscrapers (2023), featuring a unique patterned black and white cladding.

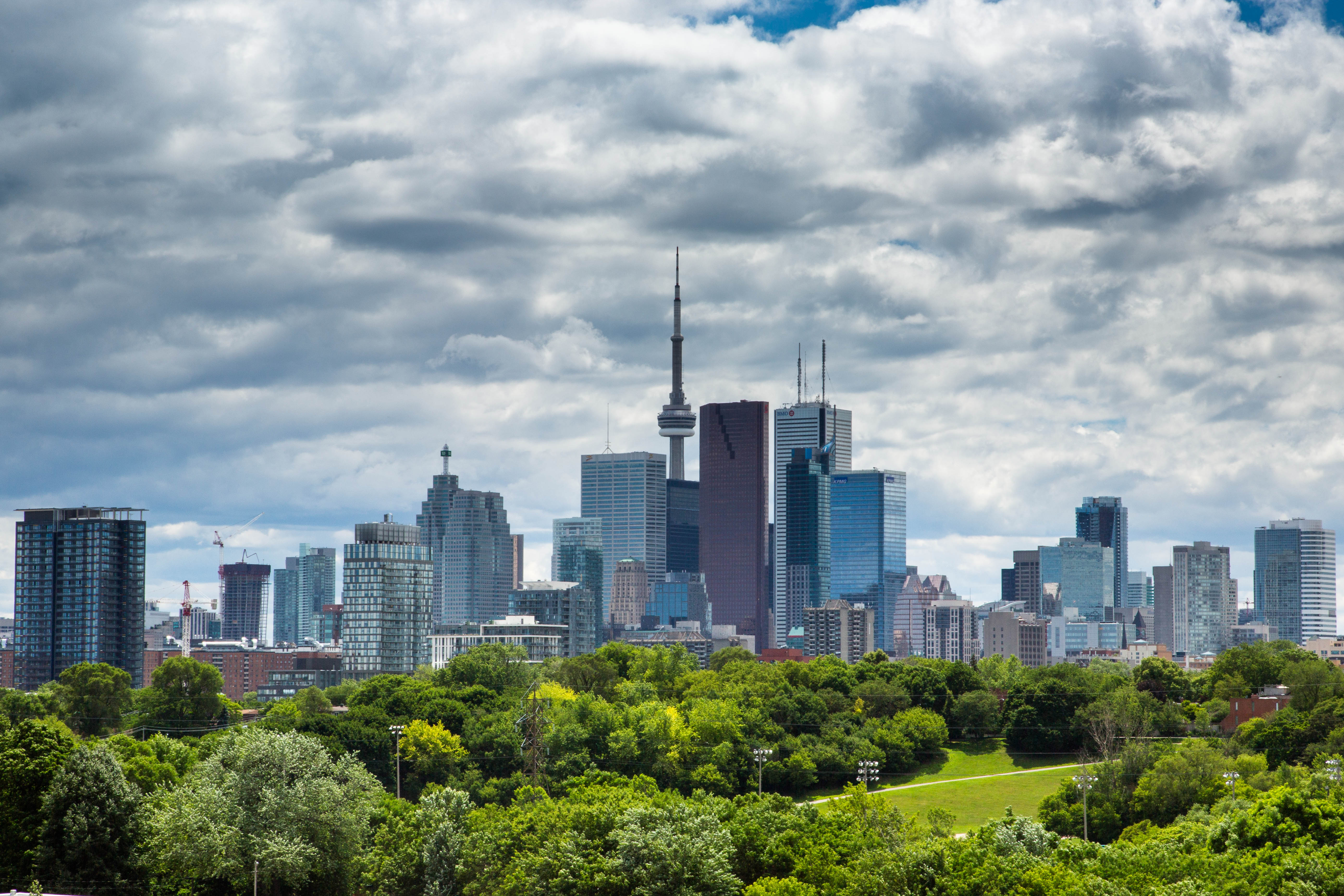
Toronto's skyline in 2012

Further east along the waterfront is the Distillery District and the planned West Don Lands, both of which are undergoing residential high-rise development. North of them is Regent Park, where high-rises have been developed in accordance with the Regent Park Revitalization Plan. West of the CN Tower and separated from the shore by Exhibition Place is Liberty Village, where a group of new towers form the centre of the new Kings West Village neighbourhood. The northward expansion of Toronto's downtown skyline has spread to neighbourhoods such as the Garden District, Church and Wellesley, St. James Town, Discovery District, and Yorkville, with the tallest skyscrapers centred around the arterials of Bay and Yonge streets. Besides Aura, notable completions include the Four Seasons Toronto (2012) and One Bloor (2017).

==== "Manhattanization" and supertall skyscrapers ====
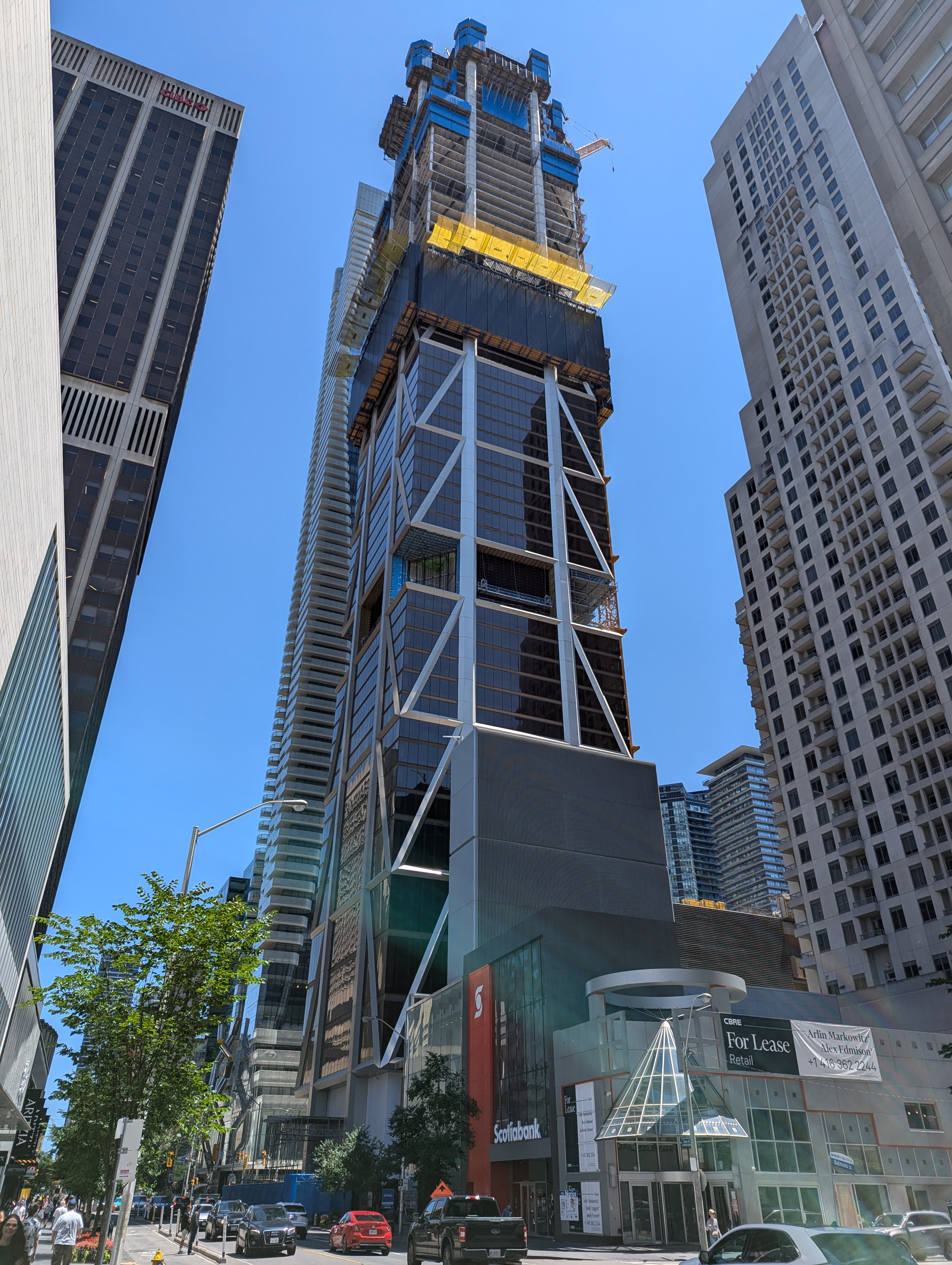
One Bloor West under construction in 2024, showing its "articulated" structural frame

The scale of Toronto's current skyscraper boom has been described as an example of Manhattanization, in reference to the skyscrapers of the namesake borough in New York City. The causes behind the boom have been attributed to Toronto's rapid population growth, expensive housing market, familiarity of new immigrants with high-rise living, positive views towards city centre living, and restrictive zoning laws. Toronto has regularly topped the RLB Crane Index, which measures the number of cranes in North American cities. In one week of 2018, Toronto City Council approved 755 storeys of new development in the city's downtown core. In 2025, Toronto surpassed 100 skyscrapers taller than 150 m (492 ft) within its city limits, being the 17th city in the world to do so. Taking into account skyscrapers under construction, the Greater Toronto Area, including the cities of Mississauga, Vaughan, and Pickering, has 148 skyscrapers taller than 150 m (492 ft) as of 2026, ahead of the Chicago metropolitan area with 138.

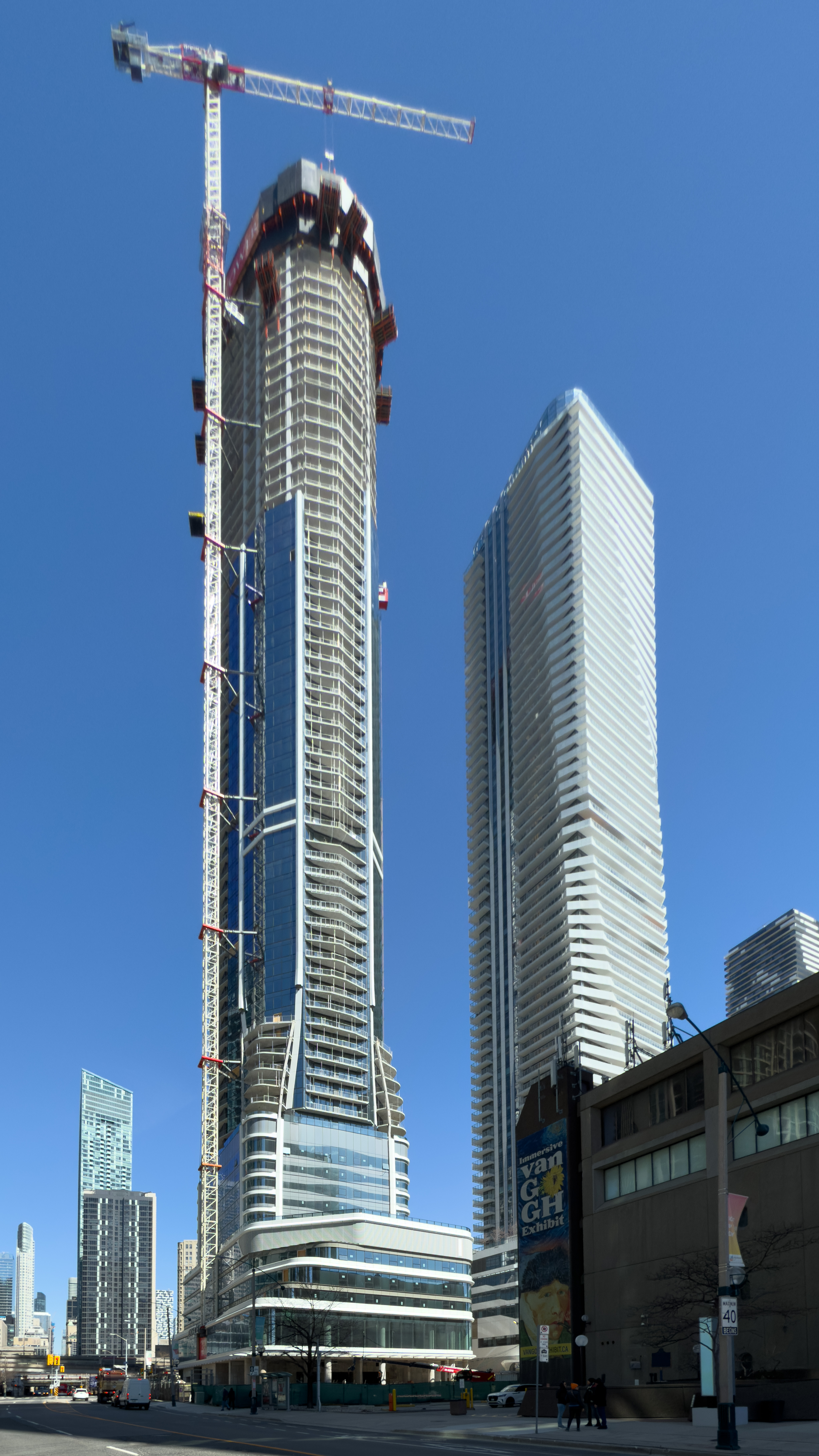
Progress on SkyTower at Pinnacle One Yonge in 2025

Since the 2010s, Toronto has received a number of proposals for supertall skyscrapers, buildings taller than 300 m (984 ft). Each would be taller than Toronto's tallest building, First Canadian Place. There are currently three under construction, all located in separate areas of the downtown skyline. The first to start construction is One Bloor West, also known as The One, which will be 309 m (1,012 ft) tall. One Bloor West is located in Yorkville, at the intersection of the Yonge and Bloor streets, where many other skyscrapers are proposed. Designed by Foster and Partners, construction began in 2017, but the building's ascent has been slow owing to financial issues; the project was put into receivership in 2023 by lenders who claimed necessary payments had not been made. Initially managed by Mizrahi Developments, since 2025 the building is being developed by Tridel. The skyscraper's appearance is marked by vertical, horizontal and diagonal framing elements and horizontal bands at regular intervals.

The Pinnacle One Yonge complex, located in the South Core area, will have some of the tallest buildings on Toronto's Harbourfront, The tallest, SkyTower, will be 351.4 m (1,153 ft), ahead of One Bloor West; should SkyTower be completed first, it would prevent One Bloor West from ever becoming Toronto's tallest building. SkyTower has white, vertical fins that stretch along its facade and merge with the building's podium. The proposed Tower 2 of the complex, at 320 m (1,049 ft), would also be a supertall skyscraper if built. Construction on a third supertall skyscraper, Concord Sky, began in earnest in 2025 after earlier delays. The Kohn Pederson Fox-designed building will have an angular roofline; located on Yonge and Gerrard street, Concord Sky sits on the same junction as Aura, between One Bloor West and Pinnacle One Yonge. Another supertall building is one of two skyscrapers on the Frank Gehry-designed Forma complex, which will feature a unique arrangement of stacked vertical boxes; as of 2026, only the shorter eastern tower is under construction.

In 2025, a proposal was made for a redevelopment of the College Park complex, which would see the addition of three skyscraper atop the Art Deco building, which will be expanded into a 12-storey podium. All three towers are taller than 200 m (656 ft), with the Central Tower being a supertall skyscraper, at 333.3 m (1,094 ft) tall. Other proposed supertalls include 19 Bloor West and 1200 Bay Street.

==== New bank icons ====
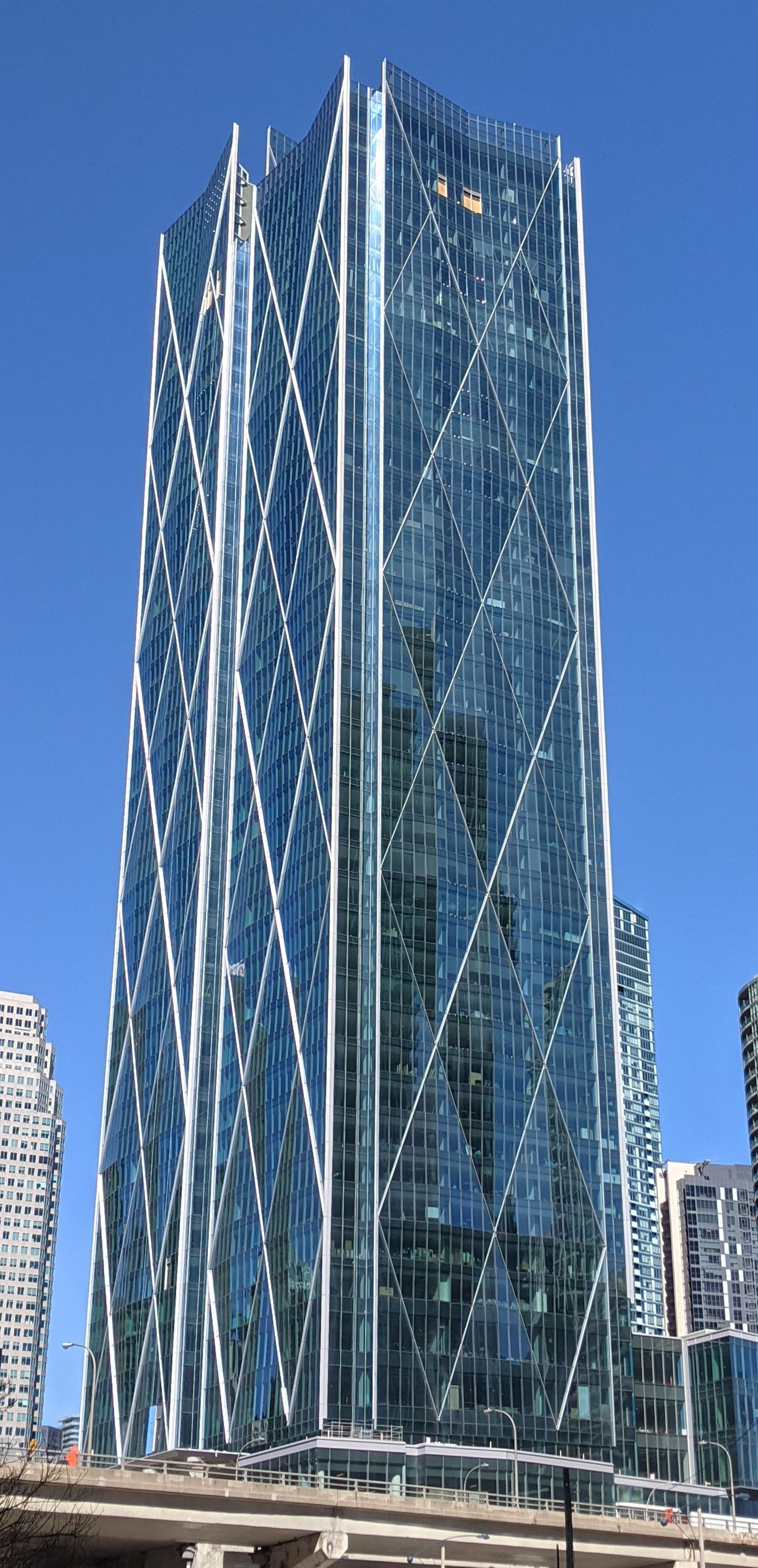
CIBC Square in 2025

Toronto-Dominion Bank and Canadian Imperial Bank of Commerce (CIBC), both responsible for some of Toronto's tallest buildings during the 20th century, would establish new skyscrapers in the Financial District during the 2020s. Work on TD Terrace, a 236.5-metre (776 ft) tall skyscraper, began in 2019 to house offices for Toronto-Dominion Bank as well as space for the Ontario Teachers' Pension Plan. Resembling a "fortress", according to The Globe and Mail, its shape is a rectangular box that bulges outwards in the middle and then gradually narrows towards the top, where a private amenity space is present. The shape lessens the downward impact of wind among pedestrians. The building's green lighting and the Toronto-Dominion Bank sign, which is taller than the one in the Toronto Dominion Centre, have drawn attention and some criticism from Torontonians.

In 2017, the CIBC announced they would be moving their headquarters and 15,000 staff from Commerce Court to a new 270,000-square-metre (2.9 million sq ft) development, then named Bay Park Centre, where they would be the anchor tenant. Construction began the same year on what would become CIBC Square, consisting of twin skyscrapers around 240 m (787 ft) tall, very slightly taller than Commerce Court West. The 49-storey south tower was completed in 2021, with the 50-storey north tower joining it in 2025. The complex's facade is distinguished by its undulating glass facade that resembles the shape of diamonds, which were designed to modulate incoming light. In addition, the complex also serves as a transit hub, with a bus station in the podium with connections to Union Station directly to its north. CIBC will retain offices in Commerce Court, which is only a few blocks away to the north.

==== Developments outside of downtown ====
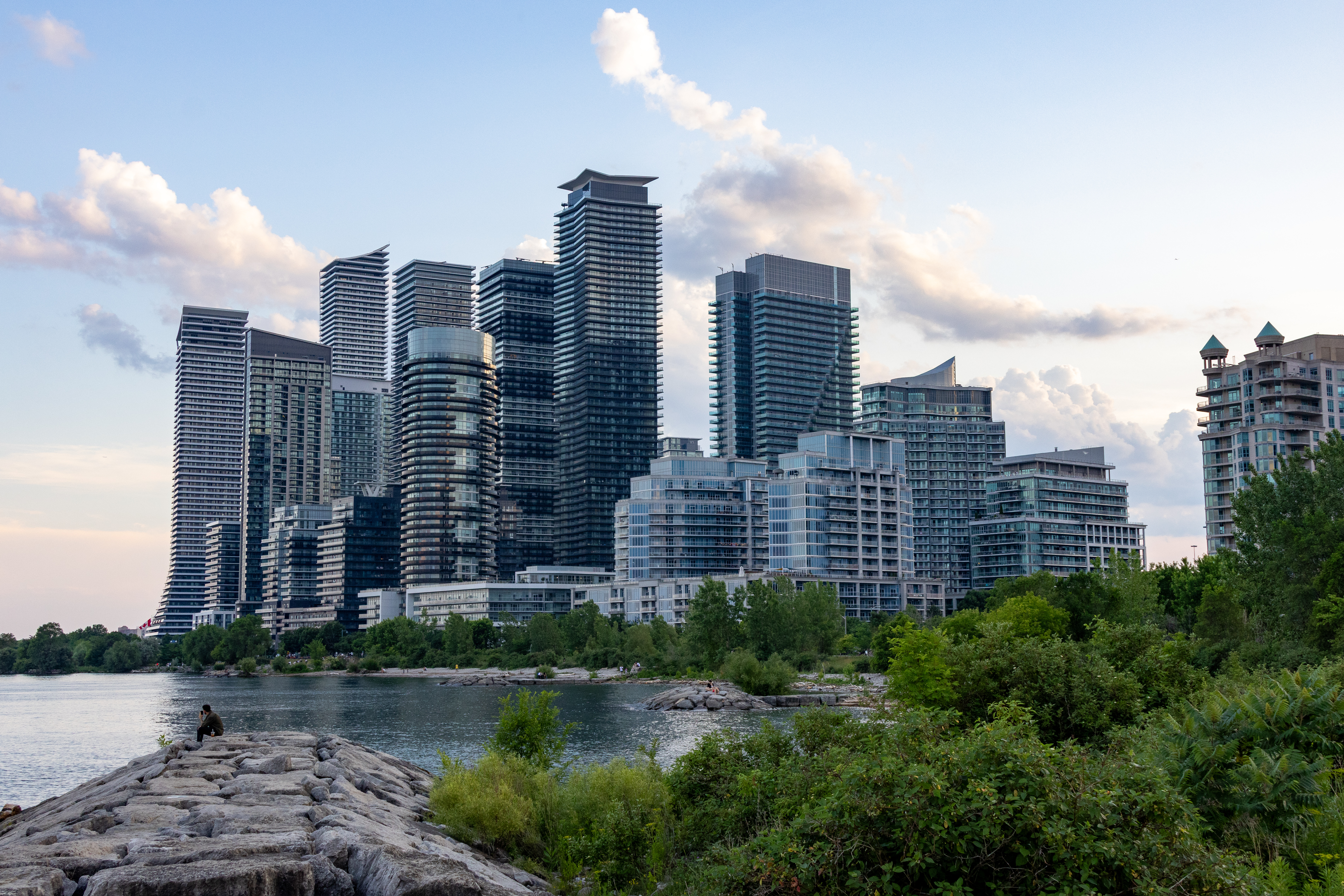
Humber Bay skyline in 2025

Toronto's skyline has become progressively multinodal in the 21st century, with skyscrapers and high-rises increasingly appearing across the Greater Toronto Area. Outside of the city of Toronto, other cities in the Greater Toronto Area, especially Mississauga and Vaughan, but also including Brampton, Markham, Oshawa, and Pickering have been undergoing significant high-rise development. Within Toronto itself, there are three high-rise clusters besides downtown that contain a skyscraper taller than 150 m (490 ft). The Humber Bay area in the former city of Etobicoke, is located far west of downtown. Since the 1980s, residential towers have been erected along the eponymous bay, beginning with The Palace Pier. In the 2010s, skyscrapers began to breach 150 m (490 ft). The tallest building in the cluster is the Eau du Soleil Sky Tower. At a height of 228 m (749 ft), it is also the tallest skyscraper in the city outside of downtown. The Sky Tower features a curved roof and a diagonal line that runs along the height of the building, as does its shorter sibling, the Water Tower.

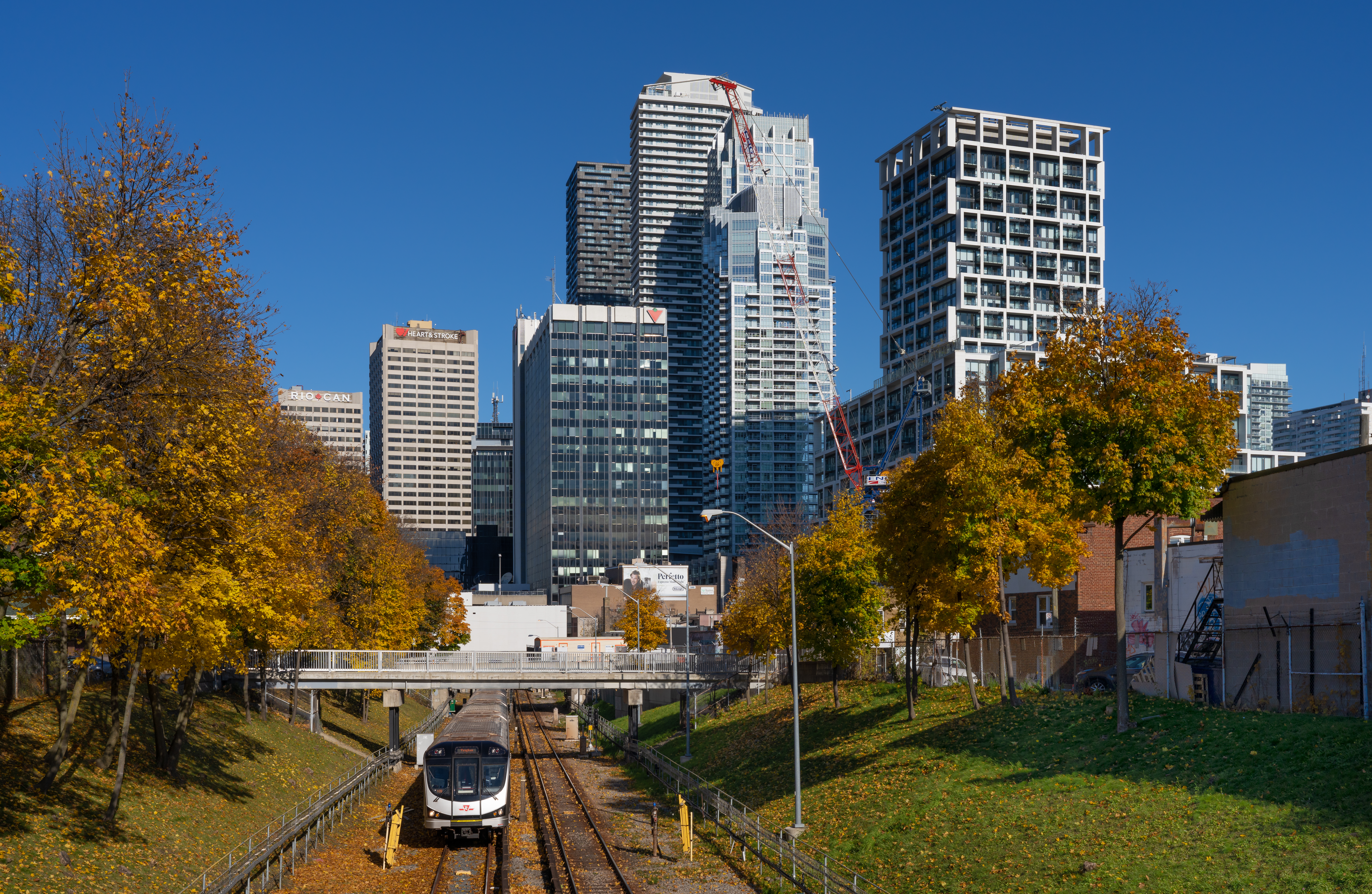
Skyscrapers in Yonge–Eglinton in 2021

The area of Midtown Toronto, also known as North Toronto or Yonge–Eglinton, is one of Toronto's business districts, and has gone through a skyscraper boom of its own. The first skyscraper above 150 m (492 ft) to rise in the district was Quantum 2, part of Minto Midtown, in 2008. It was surpassed as the tallest building in Midtown by E Condos South, built in 2019 at a height of 195.7 m (642 ft). The E Condos are known for cantilevered floors halfway up the buildings that house glass swimming pools. Other notable completions are 2221 Yonge (2021), E2 at E Place (2022), and The Parker (2022). Further north along Yonge Street is North York City Centre, which has a cluster of high-rises that run north–south along the street. Only one skyscraper reaches 150 m (492 ft): Hullmark Centre I, built in 2015, at 169.6 m (556 ft) tall. Shorter developments such as Gibson Square condos (2014), the distinctly green Emerald Park Condos (2015), Minto 88 (2015), Pivot (2020), and Diamond on Yonge (2021) have nevertheless transformed the North York skyline.

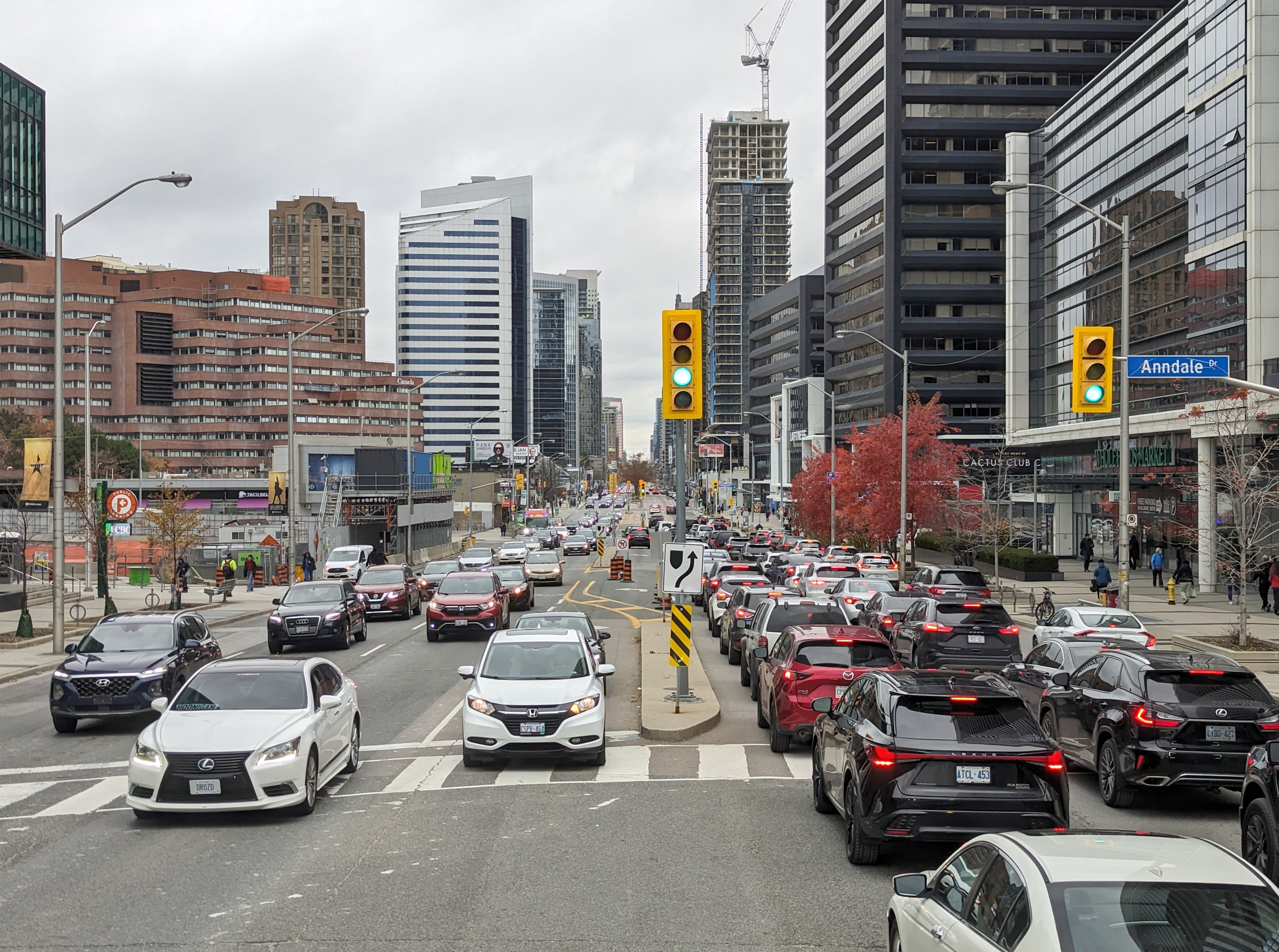
Yonge Street in North York City Centre, with Pearl Place Condominiums (right) under construction

To a lesser extent, various other areas within Toronto are undergoing influx of new high-rises, with many receiving a new tallest building in the area. The intersection of Yonge–St. Clair, around which is the area of Deer Park, is situated between Yonge–Eglinton and downtown Toronto. Its cluster of high-rises, centred on St. Clair Avenue, will be given a major boost by One Delisle, an under-construction 158 m (518 ft) skyscraper designed by Studio Gang. Its unique design consists of a series of 8-storey-high elongated hexagonal modules that nest together as they spiral up the building. In Islington-City Centre West, west of Humber Bay, the 145 m (476 ft) Islington Terrace was completed in 2021, becoming the tallest building in the neighbourhood, ahead of other new additions like Parc Nuvo at Essex (2012), Station Place (2021), and Valhalla Town Square (2022).

The northwestern neighbourhood of Weston received a new tallest building in 2019 with West 22 at Weston Common, which is 107.5 m (353 ft) tall. In Wallace Emerson, the 103.4 m (339 ft) The Diamond I was built in 2024. In Casa Loma, the Heathview towers were erected in 2015, being 109 m (357 ft) tall. Encore at Equinox became the tallest building in Scarborough City Centre in 2013. The Scarborough skyline will expand significantly with Alta, a $750 million rental development of three towers, the tallest of which will reach 149.01 m (489 ft). Several towers are under construction that would become the tallest in their respective areas, including The Frederick Condominiums in Leaside, Metro Park Condominiums I in Flemingdon Park, 8 Locust Street in Mount Dennis, and The Sloane towers in Yorkdale, all residential high-rises.

== Tallest buildings ==
There are 117 skyscrapers in Toronto that stand at least 150 metres (490 ft) tall as of 2026, based on standard height measurement which includes spires and architectural details but does not include antenna masts.

Was the tallest building in Toronto upon completion
Architecturally topped out but not yet completed

Rank	Name	Image	Location	Height m (ft)	Floors	Year	Purpose	Notes
N/A	CN Tower		290 Bremner Boulevard 43°38′33″N 79°23′14″W	553.4 (1,816)	N/A	1976	Communication; Observation	Not a habitable building. Included for comparison purposes. Tallest free-standing structure in the world from 1976 to 2007, and tallest tower until 2009.
1	SkyTower at Pinnacle One Yonge		7 Yonge Street 43°38′36″N 79°22′30″W	351.8 (1,154)	106	2026	Mixed-use	Currently the tallest building in Canada. Topped off in early 2026. First building in Canada over 100 storeys.
2	One Bloor West		1 Bloor Street West 43°40′11.7″N 79°23′13.3″W	308.9 (1,013)	85	2028	Mixed-use	Formerly known as The One. Topped off in late 2025. Briefly the tallest building in Canada from 2025 to 2026.
3	First Canadian Place		100 King Street West 43°38′56″N 79°22′54″W	298.3 (979)	72	1975	Office	Tallest building in Canada from 1975 to 2025. 8th-tallest building in the world at the time of its completion. Tallest building in the world outside Chicago and New York City at the time of its completion. Tallest building completed in Toronto in the 1970s. Formerly known as First Bank Tower.
4	The St. Regis Toronto		325 Bay Street 43°38′59″N 79°22′49″W	276.9 (908)	63	2012	Mixed-use	Tallest mixed-use building in Canada. Tallest building completed in Toronto in the 2010s. Formerly known as Trump International Hotel & Tower Toronto and later as The Adelaide Hotel.
5	Scotia Plaza		40 King Street West 43°38′58″N 79°22′46″W	275 (902)	68	1988	Office	Tallest building completed in Toronto in the 1980s.
6	Aura		388 Yonge Street 43°39′34″N 79°22′58″W	271.9 (892)	78	2014	Residential	Tallest residential building in Toronto and in Canada.
7	TD Canada Trust Tower		161 Bay Street 43°38′47″N 79°22′44″W	260.9 (856)	53	1990	Office	Tallest building completed in Toronto in the 1990s.
8	One Bloor		1 Bloor Street East 43°40′12″N 79°23′10″W	257.3 (844)	78	2017	Residential	
9	CIBC Square II		141 Bay Street 43°38′43″N 79°22′44″W	243.1 (798)	53	2026	Office	
10	CIBC Square I		81 Bay Street 43°38′39″N 79°22′40″W	241.3 (792)	49	2021	Office	Tallest building completed in Toronto in the 2020s so far.
11	Commerce Court West		199 Bay Street 43°38′54″N 79°22′46″W	239 (784)	57	1973	Office	Tallest building in Toronto from 1972 to 1975.
12	TD Terrace		160 Front Street West 43°38′43″N 79°23′04″W	236.5 (776)	48	2024	Office	8+8=16
13	ICE Condominiums II		14 York Street 43°38′31″N 79°22′54″W	234.2 (768)	68	2015	Residential	
14	Harbour Plaza East		88 Harbour Street 43°38′32″N 79°22′44″W	233 (764)	71	2017	Residential	
15	Concord Canada House 1		23 Spadina Avenue 43°38′29″N 79°23′32″W	231.3 (759)	69	2025	Residential	
16	Sugar Wharf Tower G		55 Lake Shore Boulevard East 43°38′41″N 79°22′18″W	230.2 (755)	74	2023	Residential	Also known as Sugar Wharf Tower II.
17	Eau du Soleil Sky Tower		2183 Lake Shore Boulevard West 43°37′24″N 79°28′48″W	228.2 (749)	66	2019	Residential	Canada's tallest building outside a central business district.
18	Harbour Plaza West		100 Harbour Street 43°38′32″N 79°22′47″W	224 (735)	67	2017	Residential	
19	Ten York		10 York Street 43°38′28″N 79°22′52″W	224 (735)	65	2018	Residential	
20	TD Bank Tower		66 Wellington Street West 43°38′51″N 79°22′52″W	222.8 (731)	56	1967	Office	Tallest building in Toronto from 1967 to 1972. Tallest building completed in Toronto in the 1960s. Also known simply as TD Tower.
21	11 YV	–	11 Yorkville Avenue 43°40′17″N 79°23′18″W	221.91 (728)	66	2025	Residential	
22	Sugar Wharf Tower F		55 Lake Shore Boulevard East 43°38′40″N 79°22′16″W	218.4 (717)	66	2023	Residential	
23	Prestige at Pinnacle One Yonge		28 Freeland Street 43°38′37″N 79°22′27″W	216.2 (709)	65	2022	Residential	
24	Bay Adelaide Centre West		333 Bay Street 43°39′01″N 79°22′50″W	214.7 (704)	52	2009	Office	Tallest building completed in Toronto in the 2000s.
25	Shangri-La Toronto		188 University Avenue 43°38′57″N 79°23′10″W	214 (702)	65	2012	Mixed-use	
26	Ritz-Carlton Toronto		181 Wellington Street West 43°38′43″N 79°23′13″W	209.5 (687)	54	2011	Mixed-use	
27	488 University Avenue		488 University Avenue 43°39′18″N 79°23′20″W	207.6 (681)	57	2019	Mixed-use	Also known as Residences of 488 University.
28	Bay-Wellington Tower		181 Bay Street 43°38′51″N 79°22′42″W	207 (679)	49	1991	Office	
29	L Tower		8 The Esplanade 43°38′46″N 79°22′35″W	205 (673)	59	2015	Residential	
30	Massey Tower		197 Yonge Street 43°39′13″N 79°22′45″W	204.2 (670)	62	2019	Residential	
31	Four Seasons Hotel and Residences West		60 Yorkville Avenue 43°40′18″N 79°23′24″W	204 (669)	55	2012	Mixed-Use	
32	ICE Condominiums I		12 York Street 43°38′30″N 79°22′55″W	202.3 (664)	57	2014	Residential	
33	Concord Canada House 2		23 Spadina Avenue 43°38′28″N 79°23′34″W	202.2 (663)	59	2025	Residential	
34	YC Condominiums		460 Yonge Street 43°39′43″N 79°23′01″W	202.2 (663)	60	2018	Residential	
35	88 Scott		88 Scott Street 43°38′54″N 79°22′35″W	198.2 (650)	58	2017	Residential	
36	Bay Adelaide Centre East		22 Adelaide Street West 43°39′03″N 79°22′46″W	196 (643)	44	2016	Office	
37	E Condos South		8 Eglinton Avenue East 43°42′27″N 79°23′53″W	195.7 (642)	58	2019	Residential	Also known as E Condominiums.
38	Wellesley on the Park		11 Wellesley Street West 43°39′52″N 79°23′07″W	194.2 (637)	60	2021	Residential	
39	2221 Yonge	–	2221 Yonge Street 43°42′22″N 79°23′51″W	192.5 (632)	58	2021	Residential	
40	EY Tower		100 Adelaide Street West 43°39′01″N 79°22′57″W	188.2 (617)	40	2017	Office	
41	Toronto House		225 Adelaide Street West 43°38′53″N 79°23′18″W	186.5 (612)	58	2024	Mixed-use	
42	RBC Centre		155 Wellington Street West 43°38′44″N 79°23′09″W	184.9 (607)	42	2009	Office	
43	Casa II	–	42 Charles Street East 43°40′10″N 79°23′03″W	184.5 (605)	57	2016	Residential	
44	U Condominiums East Tower		1080 Bay Street 43°40′01″N 79°23′19″W	184 (604)	55	2016	Residential	Also known as U Condominiums II.
45	1 Yorkville	–	1 Yorkville Avenue 43°40′18″N 79°23′16″W	183.2 (601)	58	2020	Residential	
46	TD North Tower		77 King Street West 43°38′53″N 79°22′55″W	182.9 (600)	46	1969	Office	
47	Water's Edge at the Cove	–	38 The Marginal Boulevard 43°37′34″N 79°28′43″W	182.3 (598)	56	2025	Residential	
48	Maple Leaf Square North Tower		65 Bremner Boulevard 43°38′34″N 79°22′50″W	181.3 (595)	54	2010	Residential	
49	8 Wellesley	–	8 Wellesley Street West 43°39′54″N 79°23′07″W	181.2 (594)	55	2025	Residential	
50	Eau Du Soleil Water Tower	–	2183 Lake Shore Boulevard West 43°37′24″N 79°28′44″W	180.8 (593)	49	2019	Residential	
51	Casa III	–	50 Charles Street East 43°40′10″N 79°23′01″W	179.6 (589)	55	2018	Residential	Also known as Casa III Condominiums & Fifty Nine Hayden.
52	Rosedale on Bloor	–	387 Bloor Street East 43°40′19″N 79°22′39″W	179 (587)	52	2022	Residential	
53	INDX Tower	–	70 Temperance Street 43°39′03″N 79°22′56″W	178.2 (585)	54	2016	Residential	
54	Vita on the Lake	–	70 Anne Craig Drive 43°37′29″N 79°28′45″W	177.1 (581)	53	2021	Residential	
55	88 Queen Street East	–	88 Queen Street East 43°39′13″N 79°22′30″W	177 (581)	57	2025	Residential	
56	One King West Hotel & Residence		1 King Street West 43°38′56″N 79°22′42″W	176.2 (578)	51	2005	Mixed-use	First building taller than 150 m (492 ft) in Toronto to be built in the 21st century.
57	8 Spadina at The Well		8 Spadina Avenue 43°38′35″N 79°23′41″W	174.1 (571)	38	2022	Office	
58	Success Tower 2	–	33 Bay Street 43°38′36″N 79°22′37″W	173.3 (569)	55	2010	Residential	
59	Royal Bank Plaza South		200 Bay Street 43°38′46″N 79°22′47″W	173 (568)	41	1979	Office	
60	Maple Leaf Square South Tower		55 Bremner Boulevard 43°38′32″N 79°22′51″W	171.3 (562)	50	2010	Mixed-use	
61	The Selby	–	25 Selby Street 43°40′16″N 79°22′38″W	170.6 (560)	51	2019	Residential	
62	Teahouse Condominiums South	–	501 Yonge Street 43°39′48″N 79°23′01″W	170 (558)	52	2022	Residential	
63	Eight Cumberland	–	8 Cumberland Street 43°40′17″N 79°23′16″W	169.8 (557)	51	2023	Residential	
64	Hullmark Centre I		5 Sheppard Avenue East 43°45′41″N 79°24′35″W	169.6 (556)	45	2015	Mixed-use	
65	Lago	–	56 Anne Craig Drive 43°37′32″N 79°28′44″W	167.5 (550)	49	2016	Residential	Also known as Lago at the Waterfront.
66	55C	–	55 Charles Street East 43°40′08″N 79°23′01″W	167 (548)	48	2024	Residential	
67	252 Church		252 Church Street 43°39′22″N 79°22′38″W	166.1 (545)	52	2025	Residential	
68	44 Charles Street West		44 Charles Street West 43°40′07″N 79°23′18″W	166 (545)	51	1974	Residential	
69	Karma	–	24 Grenville Street 43°39′42″N 79°23′03″W	165.9 (544)	50	2016	Residential	
70	Quantum 2		2191 Yonge Street 43°42′20″N 79°23′51″W	165 (541)	51	2008	Residential	Also known as Quantum North.
71	Theatre Park	–	224 King Street West 43°38′51″N 79°23′14″W	164.8 (541)	47	2015	Residential	
72	Social	–	229 Church Street 43°39′23″N 79°22′36″W	164.8 (541)	52	2023	Residential	Also known as Social at Church + Dundas.
73	400 King West	–	400 King Street West 43°38′46″N 79°23′35″W	164.6 (540)	49	2026	Residential	
74	Burke Condominiums	–	603 Sherbourne Street 43°40′17″N 79°22′35″W	163.3 (536)	53	2026	Residential	
75	Residences of College Park I		763 Bay Street 43°39′37″N 79°23′06″W	163 (535)	51	2006	Residential	Also known as Residences of College Park North.
76	Burano		832 Bay Street 43°39′44″N 79°23′11″W	163 (535)	50	2012	Residential	Also known as Burnao on Bay.
77	Success Tower 1		18 Harbour Street 43°38′34″N 79°22′38″W	161.9 (531)	52	2011	Residential	Also known as 33 Bay Residences at Pinnacle Centre.
78	Pinnacle Etobicoke 2A	–	5415 Dundas Street West 43°37′55″N 79°32′33″W	161.9 (531)	48	2025	Residential	
79	E2 at E Place	–	41 Roehampton Avenue 43°42′28″N 79°23′49″W	161.8 (531)	48	2022	Residential	
80	X2	–	101 Charles Street East 43°40′10″N 79°22′50″W	161.1 (529)	44	2015	Residential	
81	FIVE	–	5 St. Joseph Street 43°39′56″N 79°23′08″W	161 (528)	48	2016	Residential	
82	Kipling Station Condos	–	5251 Dundas Street West 43°38′17″N 79°32′16″W	160.8 (528)	50	2026	Residential	Topped out in May 2026.
83	Alias	–	120 Church Street 43°39′07″N 79°22′32″W	158.7 (521)	48	2026	Residential	
84	The Uptown Residences		35 Balmuto Street 43°40′10″N 79°23′15″W	158 (518)	48	2011	Residential	
85	One Delisle		1 Delisle Avenue 43°41′20″N 79°23′42″W	158 (518)	48	2027	Residential	
86	Three Hundred		300 Front Street West 43°38′39″N 79°23′22″W	157.9 (518)	52	2014	Residential	
87	Lighthouse Tower Condominium	–	132 Queens Quay East 43°38′43″N 79°22′09″W	157.9 (518)	45	2020	Residential	Also known as Lighthouse West at Daniels Waterfront.
88	The Well Residential One		435 Wellington Street West 43°38′34″N 79°23′44″W	157.3 (516)	46	2023	Residential	Also known as FourFifty The Well.
89	Grid Condos	–	181 Dundas Street East 43°39′25″N 79°22′27″W	157 (515)	50	2019	Residential	
90	16 York	–	16 York Street 43°38′33″N 79°22′55″W	157 (515)	32	2020	Office	
91	Delta Toronto Hotel		75 Lower Simcoe Street 43°38′36″N 79°23′02″W	156.8 (514)	47	2014	Hotel	
92	One York Street		1 York Street 43°38′30″N 79°22′49″W	156.8 (514)	35	2016	Office	
93	Festival Tower		80 John Street 43°38′49″N 79°23′25″W	156.7 (514)	42	2011	Mixed-use	
94	Hotel Riu Plaza Toronto	–	30 Widmer Street 43°38′50″N 79°23′31″W	156.1 (512)	48	2021	Mixed-use	Mixed-use residential and hotel building.
95	Theatre District Residences	–	8 Widmer Street 43°38′49″N 79°23′30″W	156.1 (512)	49	2021	Residential	
96	Dundas Square Gardens	–	251 Jarvis Street 43°39′27″N 79°22′27″W	156 (512)	48	2020	Residential	
97	No. 55 Mercer	–	55 Mercer Street 43°38′43″N 79°23′29″W	156 (512)	47	2024	Residential	
98	Nobu Residences East Tower	–	15 Mercer Street 43°38′44″N 79°23′25″W	156 (512)	49	2024	Residential	Also known as Nobu Residences II.
99	Nobu Residences West Tower	–	35 Mercer Street 43°38′44″N 79°23′28″W	156 (512)	49	2024	Residential	Also known as Nobu Hotel & Residences I.
100	King Blue North Tower	–	355 King Street West 43°38′46″N 79°23′29″W	155.8 (511)	48	2020	Mixed-use	Also called King Blue Hotel & Condominiums.
101	PJ Condos		99 John Street 43°38′51″N 79°23′24″W	155.8 (511)	49	2020	Residential	
102	Maverick	–	333 King Street West 43°38′46″N 79°23′28″W	154.5 (507)	49	2025	Residential	
103	U Condominiums West Tower	–	65 St. Mary Street 43°40′01″N 79°23′22″W	154 (505)	45	2015	Residential	Also known as U Condominiums I.
104	87 Peter	–	87 Peter Street 43°38′49″N 79°23′32″W	154 (505)	49	2018	Residential	
105	Yonge + Rich	–	25 Richmond Street East 43°39′07″N 79°22′37″W	154 (505)	45	2021	Residential	
106	TD South Tower		79 Wellington Street West 43°38′48″N 79°22′52″W	153.6 (504)	39	1985	Office	
107	Westlake Village 1	–	2220 Lake Shore Boulevard West 43°37′22″N 79°29′00″W	153.3 (503)	48	2015	Residential	
108	35 Mariner	–	35 Mariner Terrace 43°38′23″N 79°23′31″W	153.2 (503)	49	2005	Residential	Also known as Harbourview Estates II at Cityplace.
109	Montage		25 Telegram Mews 43°38′28″N 79°23′40″W	153 (502)	48	2009	Residential	Also called Montage at Cityplace.
110	IMMIX	–	484 Yonge Street 43°39′46″N 79°23′03″W	153 (502)	45	2023	Residential	
111	Peter & Adelaide	–	114 Peter Street 43°38′52″N 79°23′36″W	153 (502)	47	2024	Residential	
112	The Charles at Church	–	68 Charles Street East 43°40′10″N 79°22′59″W	152.7 (501)	47	2026	Residential	
113	Beyond the Sea Star Tower	–	2230 Lake Shore Boulevard West 43°37′18″N 79°28′58″W	151.5 (497)	44	2012	Residential	
114	Chaz Yorkville Condos	–	45 Charles Street East 43°40′08″N 79°23′02″W	151.4 (497)	47	2015	Residential	
115	The 250		250 Yonge Street 43°39′17″N 79°22′50″W	150.6 (494)	35	1992	Residential	Also known as 250 Yonge at Toronto Eaton Centre.
116	Monde	–	12 Bonnycastle Street 43°38′47″N 79°21′54″W	150 (492)	44	2018	Residential	
117	The Saint	–	89 Church Street 43°39′07″N 79°22′30″W	150 (492)	45	2025	Residential	

=== Tallest completed buildings by neighbourhood ===
Multiple neighbourhoods in Toronto have high-rises taller than 100 m (328 ft).

Sub- division	Neighbourhoods	Name	Height m (ft)	Floors	Year	Notes
Old Toronto, Downtown	Financial District	First Canadian Place	298.1 (978)	72	1975	
Old Toronto, Downtown	Yorkville	One Bloor	257.3 (844)	78	2017	
Old Toronto, Midtown	Yonge–Eglinton	E Condos South	195.7 (642)	58	2019	
Old Toronto, Midtown	Casa Loma / Forest Hill	The Heathview Apartments (Twin buildings)	109 (358)	30	2015	
Old Toronto, West End	Wallace Emerson	The Diamond I	101.1 (332)	36	2024	
East York	Thorncliffe Park	Leaside Towers (Twin buildings)	129 (423)	44	1970	
East York	Taylor–Massey / Crescent Town	Bela Square Phase 1	112.5 (369)	35	2025	
East York	Wynford–Concorde	Accolade	110 (361)	36	2009	
York	Weston	West 22 at Weston Common	107.5 (353)	30	2019	
Etobicoke	The Queensway –Humber Bay	Eau du Soleil Sky Tower	228.2 (749)	66	2019	
Etobicoke	Islington-City; Centre West	Islington Terrace	145.1 (476)	45	2020	
Etobicoke	Eatonville	Thunderbird at One Valhalla	111.3 (365)	35	2014	
North York	Willowdale	Hullmark Centre	169.6 (556)	45	2015	
North York	Henry Farm	Alto at Atria	137.3 (450)	43	2016	
North York	Bayview Village	Empire Tower	130 (427)	28	2005	
North York	Parkway Forest	Emerald City I	126 (413)	37	2014	
North York	Don Mills	Rodeo Drive Condominiums 1	105.5 (346)	32	2024	
North York	Yorkdale–Glen Park	The Sloane East Tower	103.4 (339)	29	2025	
Scarborough	Scarborough; City Centre	Encore at Equinox	131 (430)	39	2013	
Scarborough	Agincourt	Solaris at Metrogate (Twin buildings)	127 (417)	40	2017	

=== Map of tallest buildings ===
==== Downtown Toronto ====
Most of Toronto's skyscrapers are in Downtown Toronto, clustered near the waterfront and along Yonge Street.

Buildings in Toronto over 150m in height
Each marker is coloured by the decade of the building's completion. An asterisk (*) next to the building's name indicates it is located outside the map.
- 1960s
- 1970s
- 1980s
- 1990s
- 2000s
- 2010s
- 2020s
1 SkyTower at Pinnacle One Yonge
2 One Bloor West
3 First Canadian Place
4 The St. Regis Toronto
5 Scotia Plaza
6 Aura
7 TD Canada Trust Tower
8 One Bloor
9 CIBC Square II
10 CIBC Square I
11 TD Terrace
12 Commerce Court West
13 ICE Condominiums II
14 Harbour Plaza East
15 Concord Canada House 1
16 Sugar Wharf Tower G
17 Eau du Soleil Sky Tower*
18 Harbour Plaza West
19 Ten York
20 TD Bank Tower
21 11 YV
22 Sugar Wharf Tower F
23 Prestige at Pinnacle One Yonge
24 Bay Adelaide Centre West
25 Shangri-La Toronto
26 Ritz-Carlton Toronto
27 488 University Avenue
28 Bay-Wellington Tower
29 L Tower
30 Massey Tower
31 Four Seasons Hotel and Residences West
32 ICE Condominiums I
33 Concord Canada House 2
34 YC Condominiums
35 88 Scott
36 Bay Adelaide Centre East
37 E Condos South*
38 Wellesley on the Park
39 2221 Yonge*
40 EY Tower
41 Toronto House
42 RBC Centre
43 Casa II
44 U Condominiums East Tower
45 1 Yorkville
46 TD North Tower
47 Water's Edge at the Cove*
48 Maple Leaf Square North Tower
49 8 Wellesley
50 Eau Du Soleil Water Tower*
51 Casa III
52 Rosedale on Bloor
53 INDX Tower
54 Vita on the Lake*
55 88 Queen Street East
56 One King West Hotel & Residence
57 8 Spadina at The Well
58 Success Tower 2
59 Royal Bank Plaza South
60 Maple Leaf Square South Tower
61 The Selby
62 Teahouse Condominiums South
63 Eight Cumberland
64 Hullmark Centre I*
65 Lago*
66 55C
67 252 Church
68 44 Charles Street West
69 Karma
70 Quantum 2*
71 Theatre Park
72 Social
73 400 King West
74 Burke Condominiums
75 Residences of College Park I
76 Burano
77 Success Tower 1
78 Pinnacle Etobicoke 2A
79 E2 at E Place*
80 X2
81 FIVE
82 Kipling Station Condos
83 Alias
84 The Uptown Residences
85 One Delisle
86 Three Hundred
87 Lighthouse Tower Condominium
88 The Well Residential One
89 Grid Condos
90 16 York
91 Delta Toronto Hotel
92 One York Street
93 Festival Tower
94 Riu Plaza Hotel
95 Theatre District Residences
96 Dundas Square Gardens
97 No. 55 Mercer
98 Nobu Residences East Tower
99 Nobu Residences West Tower
100 King Blue North Tower
101 PJ Condos
102 Maverick
103 87 Peter
104 U Condominiums West Tower
105 Yonge + Rich
106 TD South Tower
107 Westlake Village 1*
108 35 Mariner
109 IMMIX
110 Montage
111 Peter & Adelaide
112 The Charles at Church
113 Beyond the Sea Star Tower*
114 Chaz Yorkville Condos
115 The 250
116 Monde
117 The Saint

==== Rest of Toronto ====
There are eight skyscrapers taller than 150 m (492 ft) in Toronto outside of downtown located in Humber Bay, four in Midtown, and one in North York City Centre.

The Queensway–Humber Bay
Skyscrapers taller than 150 m (492 ft)
- 2010s
- 2020s
17 Eau du Soleil Sky Tower
47 Water's Edge at the Cove
50 Eau Du Soleil Water Tower
54 Vita on the Lake
65 Lago
78 Pinnacle Etobicoke 2A*
107 Westlake Village 1
113 Beyond the Sea Star Tower

Yonge–Eglinton
Skyscrapers taller than 150 m (492 ft)
- 2000s
- 2010s
- 2020s
37 E Condos South
39 2221 Yonge
70 Quantum 2
79 E2 at E Place

North York City Centre
Skyscrapers taller than 150 m (492 ft)
- 2010s
64 Hullmark Centre I

== Tallest under construction ==
There are 13 skyscrapers that are under construction in Toronto that are expected to be at least 150 m (492 ft) tall as of 2026, based on standard height measurement which spires and architectural details but does not include antenna masts.

Rank	Name	Image	Height m (ft)	Floors	Year	Purpose	Notes
1	Concord Sky (385 Yonge Street)		300.2 (985)	85	2027	Residential	
2	Forma East Tower (266 King Street West)		266.5 (874)	74	2028	Residential	
3	8 Elm Street		220.3 (723)	69	2027	Residential	
4	The Pemberton (33 Yorkville Avenue)		215.8 (708)	68	2026	Residential	
5	Q Tower (200 Queens Quay West)		197.4 (648)	59	2029	Residential	
6	Queen Church		186.2 (611)	57	2028	Residential	
7	The United BLDG (481 University Avenue)		179.5 (589)	54	2027	Mixed-use	
8	241 Church Street		170.1 (558)	53	2027	Residential	
9	The Bourne		169.8 (557)	57	2027	Residential	
10	4800 Yonge		167.1 (548)	49	2027	Mixed-use	
11	170 Roehampton		162.5 (533)	49	2027	Residential	
12	Pinnacle Lakeside Tower 1 (215 Lake Shore Boulevard East)		157 (515)	49	2027	Residential	
13	49 Ontario Street West Tower		152.4 (500)	44	TBD	Mixed-use	

== Timeline of tallest buildings ==
Name	Image	Street address	Years as tallest	Height m / ft	Floors
Beard Building		163 King Street East	1894–1896	30 / 98	7
Temple Building		62 Richmond Street West	1896–1906	40 / 131	10
Trader's Bank Building		67 Yonge Street	1906–1912	60 / 197	15
Canadian Pacific Building		69 Yonge Street	1912–1915	65 / 213	15
Royal Bank Building		2 King Street East	1915–1928	89 / 295	20
Sterling Tower		372 Bay Street	1928–1929	90 / 295	21
Royal York Hotel		100 Front Street West	1929–1931	124 / 407	28
Commerce Court North		25 King Street West	1931–1967	145 / 476	34
Toronto-Dominion Bank Tower		66 Wellington Street West	1967–1973	223 / 731	56
Commerce Court West		199 Bay Street	1973–1975	239 / 784	57
First Canadian Place		100 King Street West	1975–2025	298 / 978	72
One Bloor West		1 Bloor Street West	2025–2026	309 / 1,012	85
SkyTower at Pinnacle One Yonge		7 Yonge Street	2026–	356 / 1,168	106

== Cityscape ==
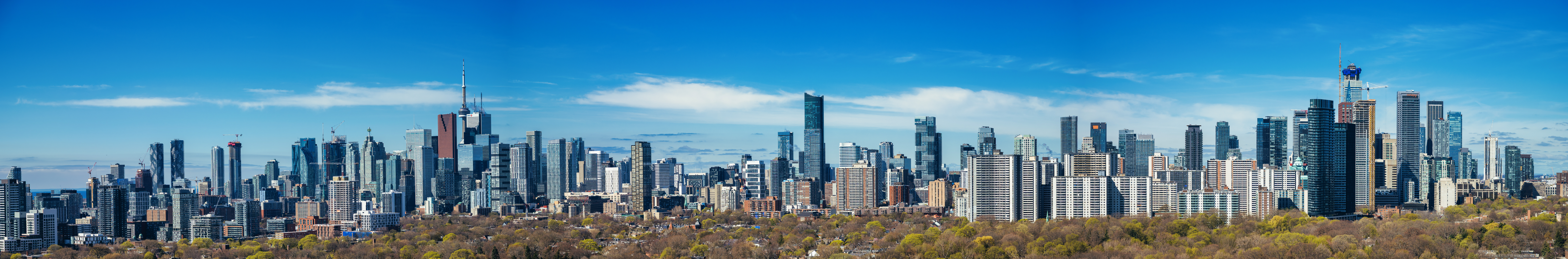
High-resolution panorama of Downtown Toronto, taken in April 2025 (Click or hover over image to identify buildings)

== Skylines ==
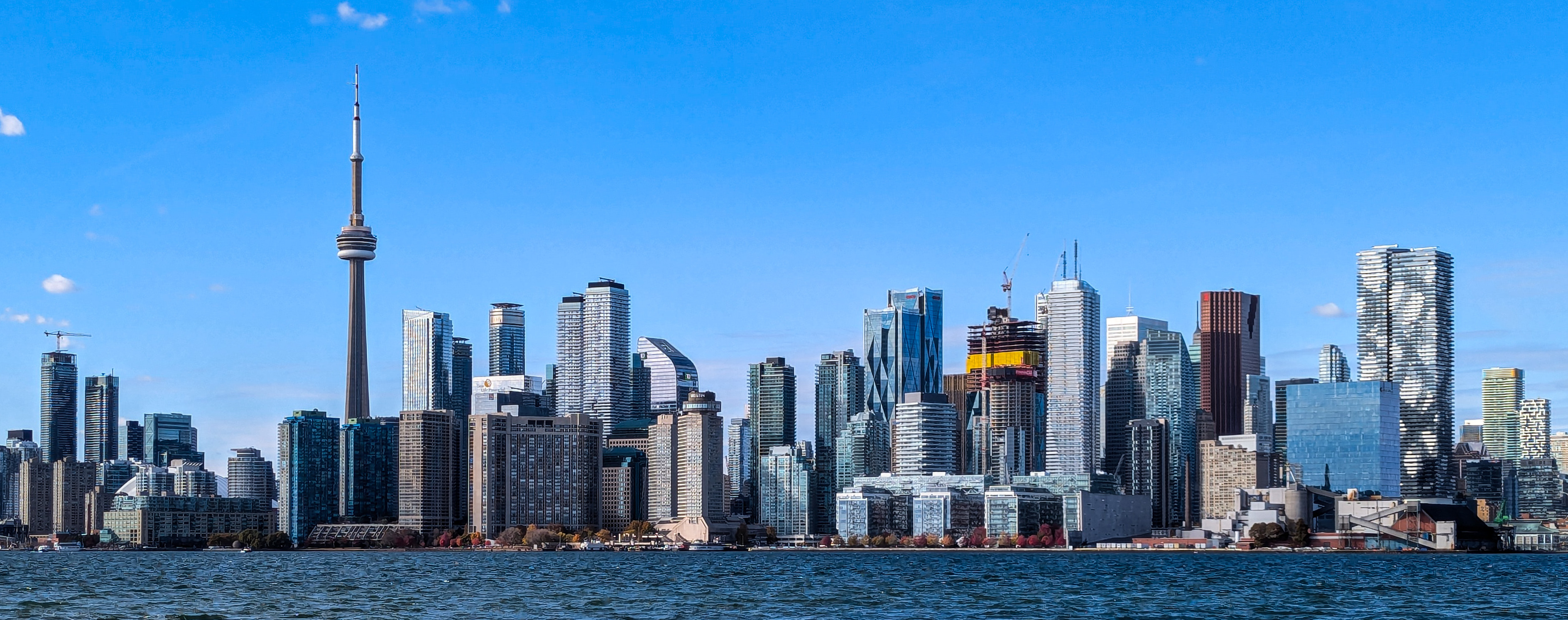
Downtown Toronto

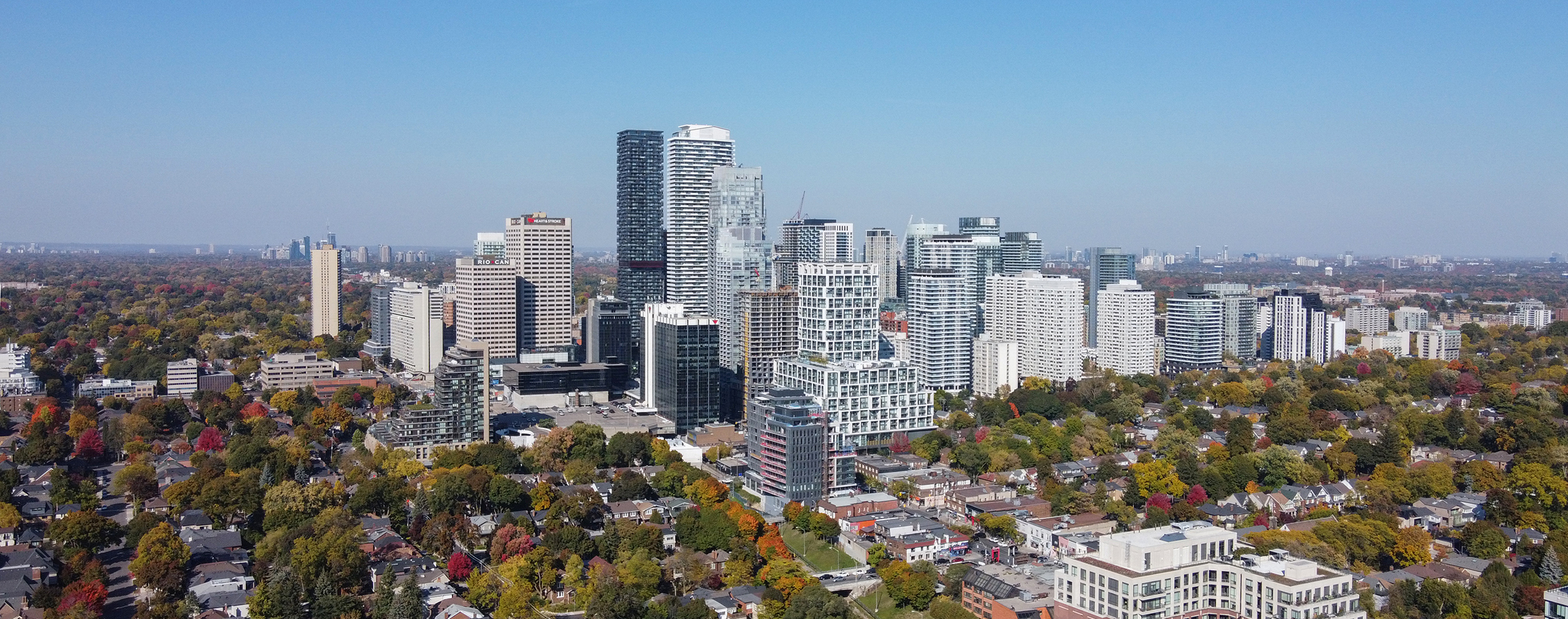
Yonge–Eglinton

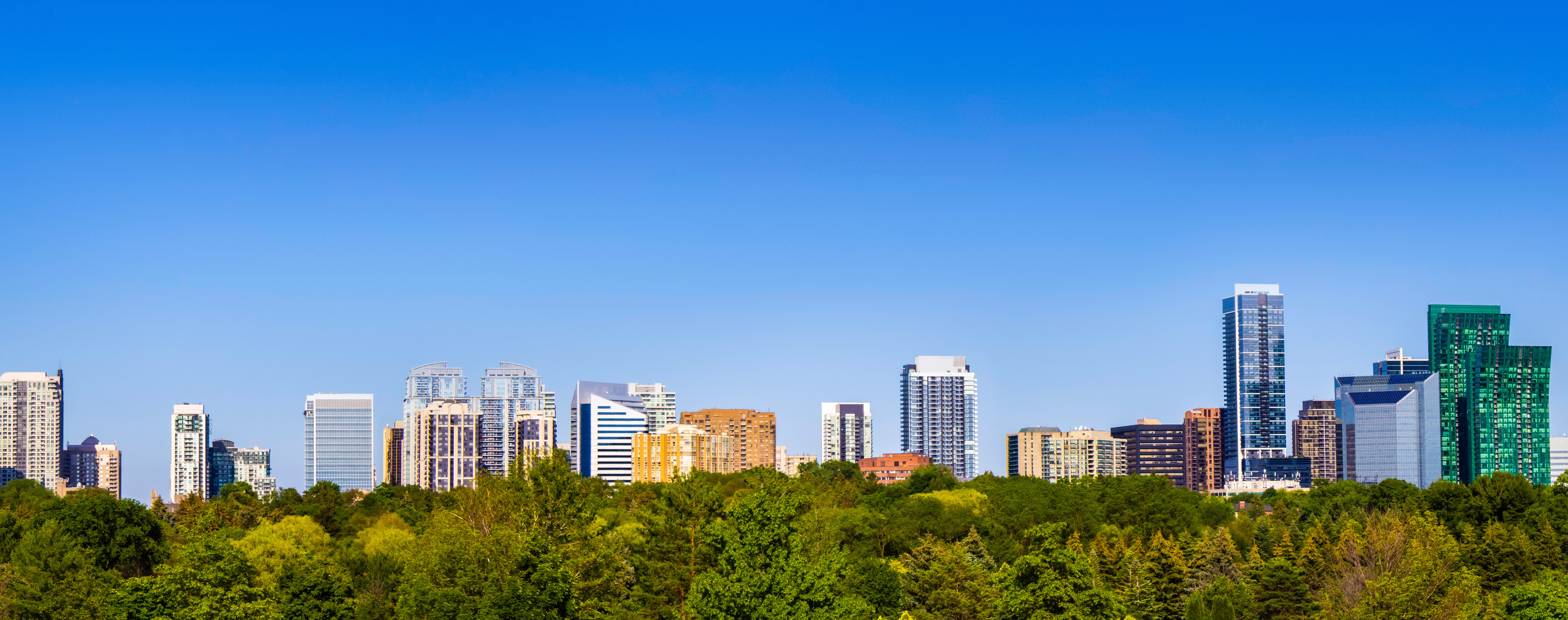
North York City Centre

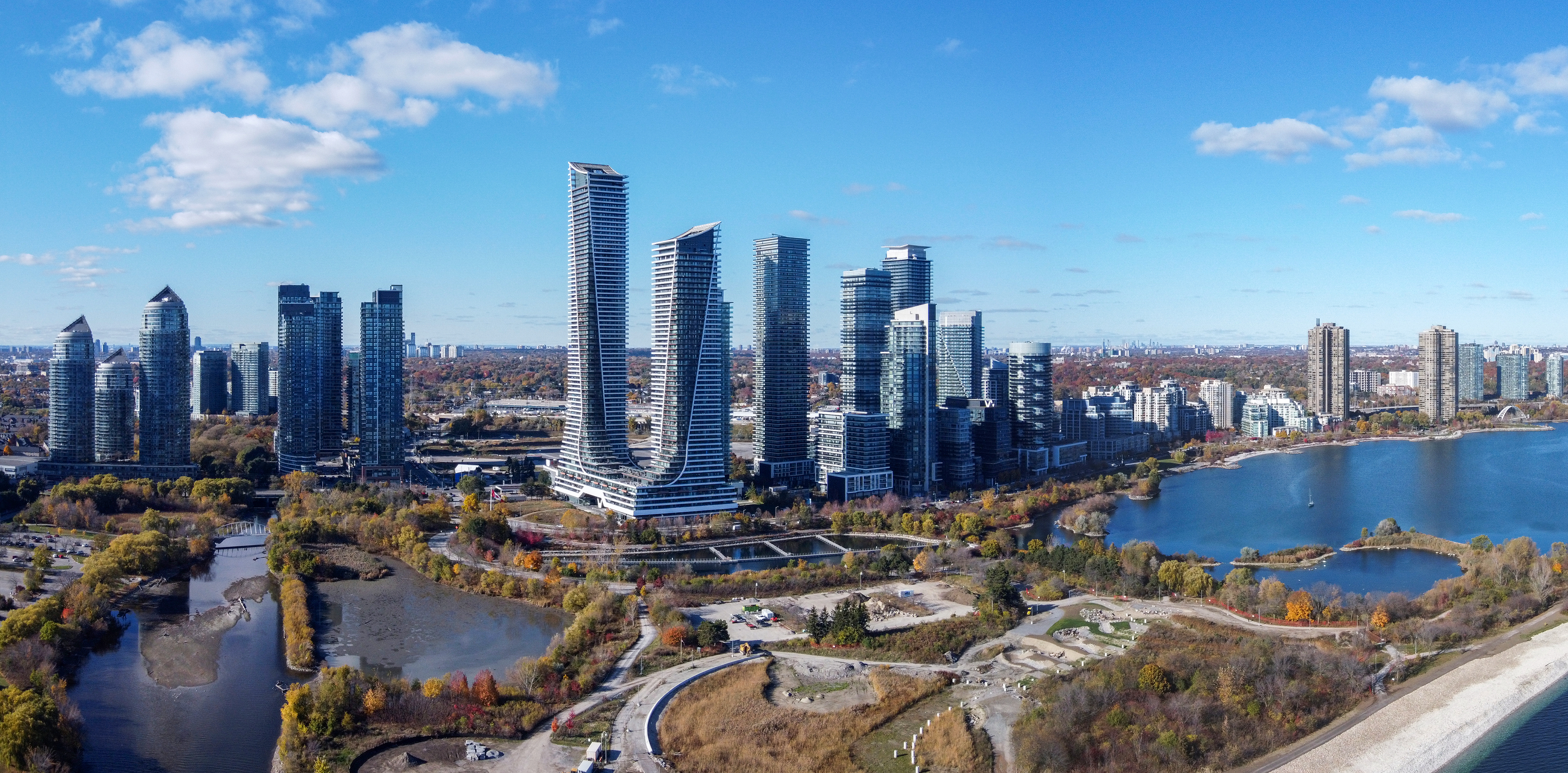
Humber Bay

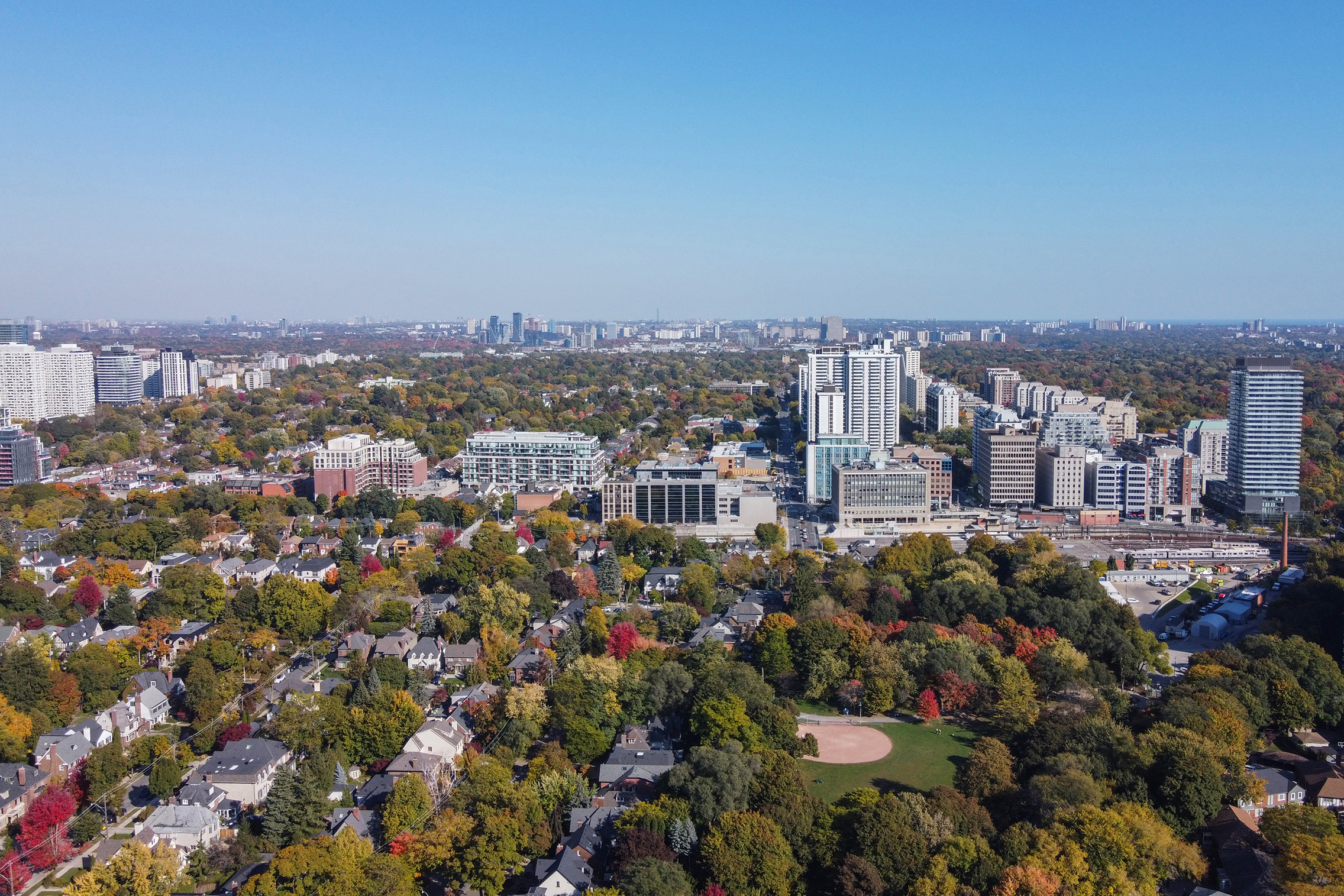
Davisville Village

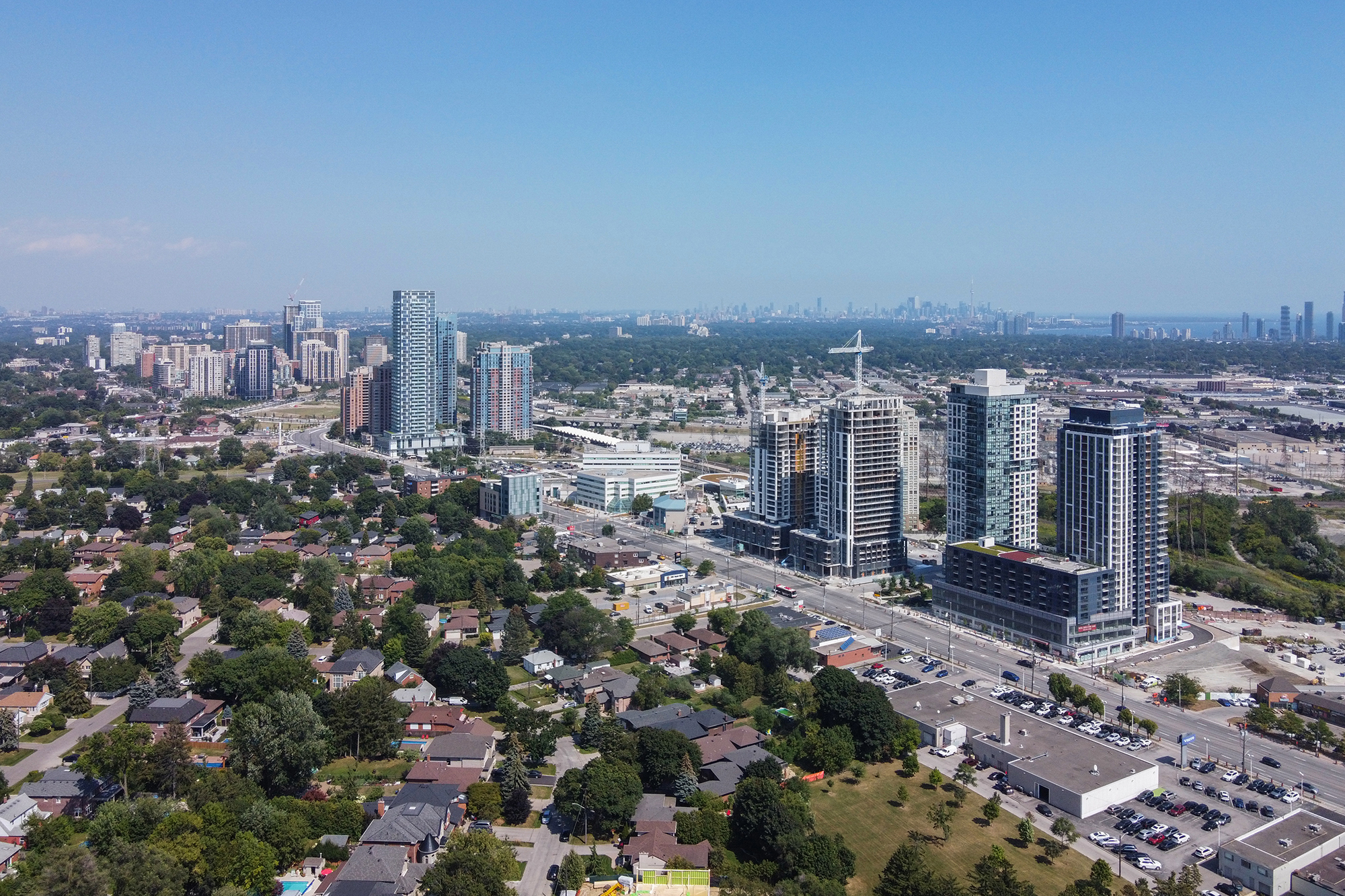
Islington-City Centre West

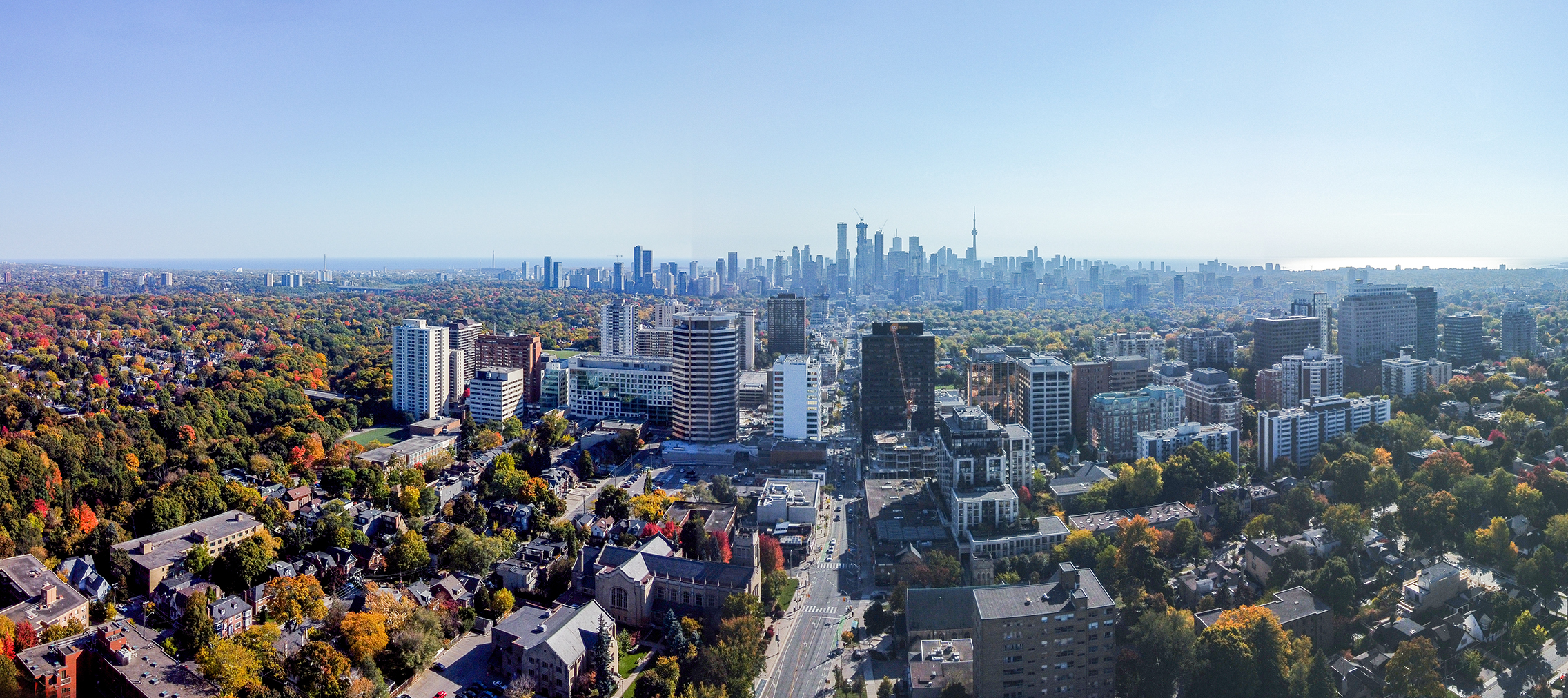
Deer Park

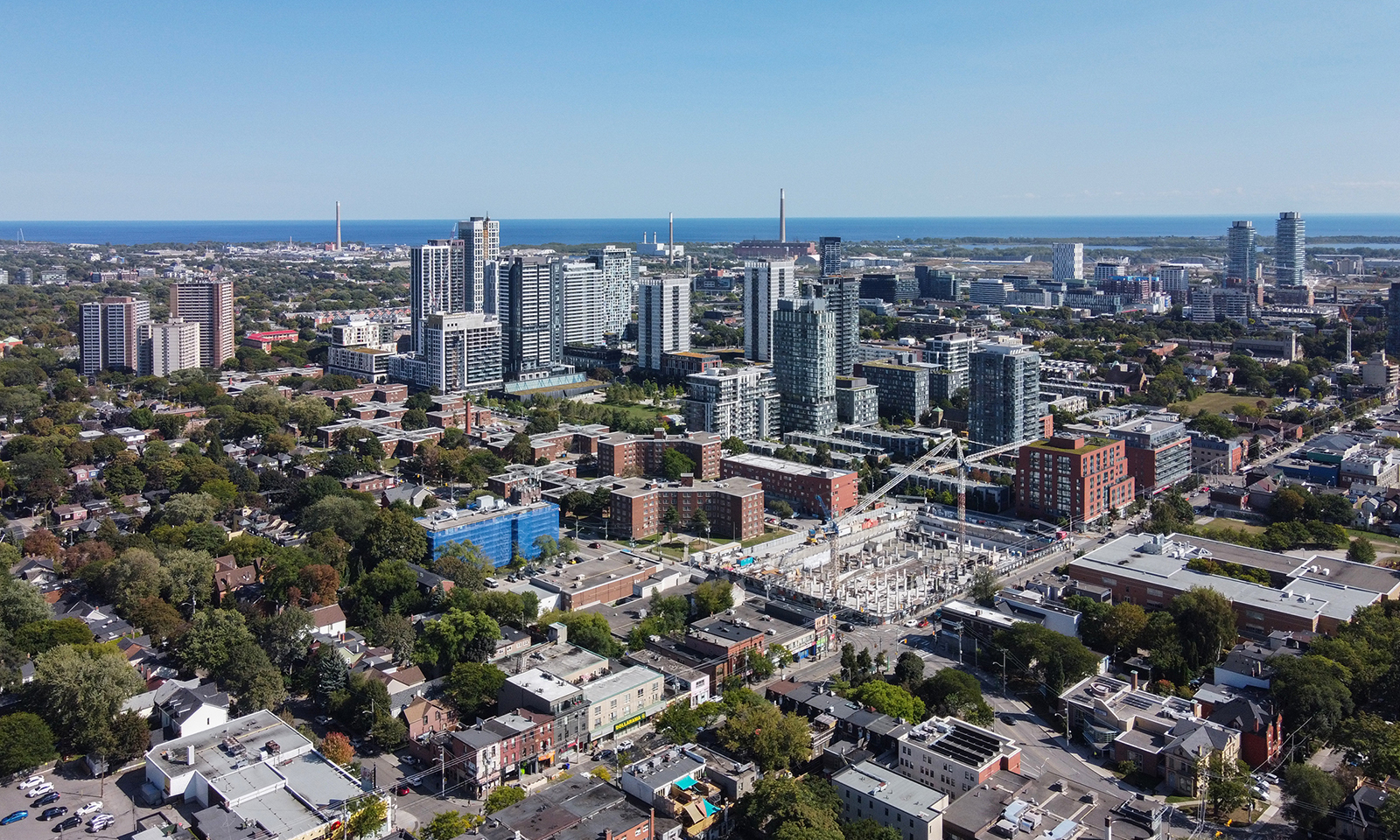
Regent Park

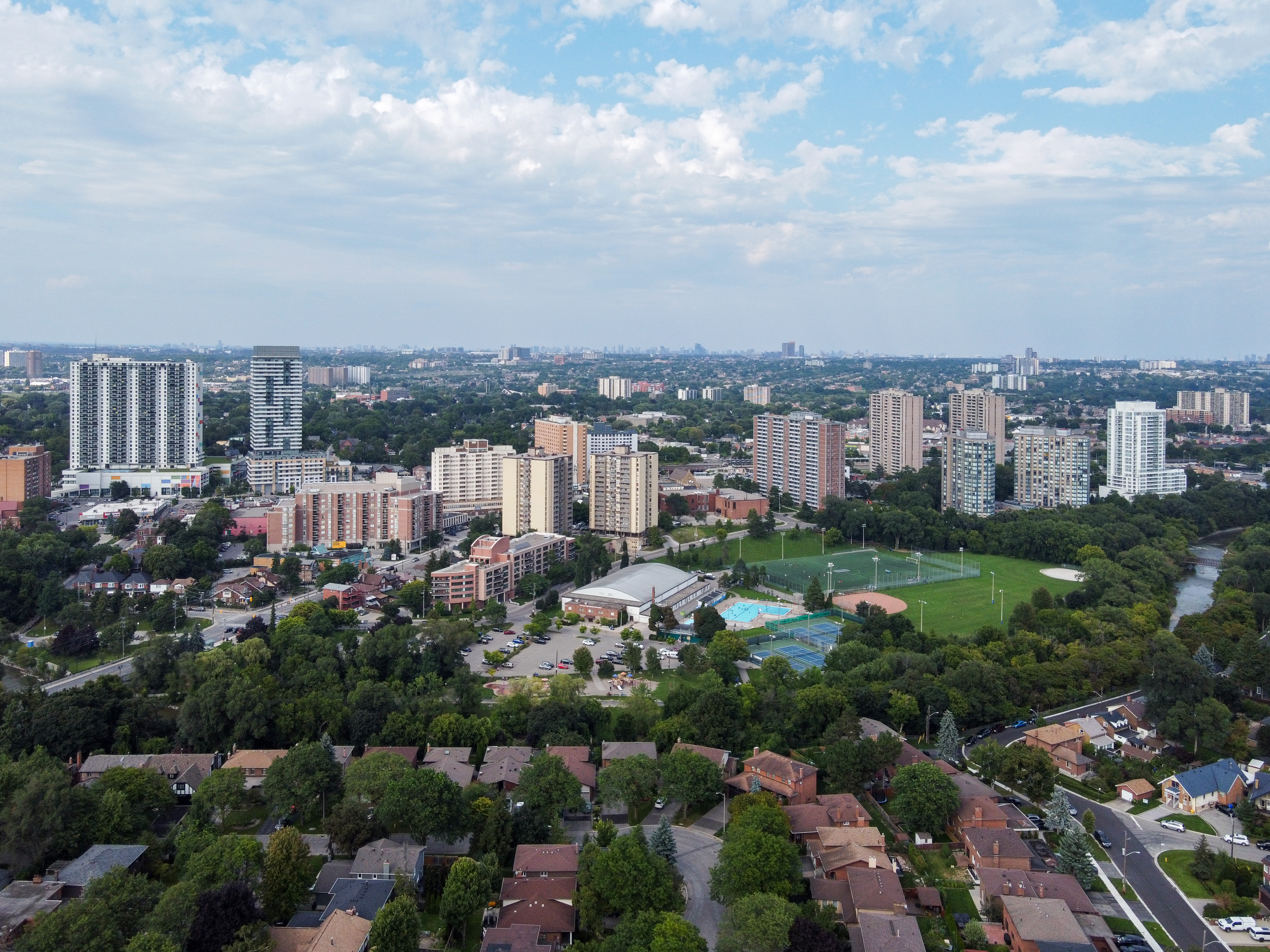
Weston

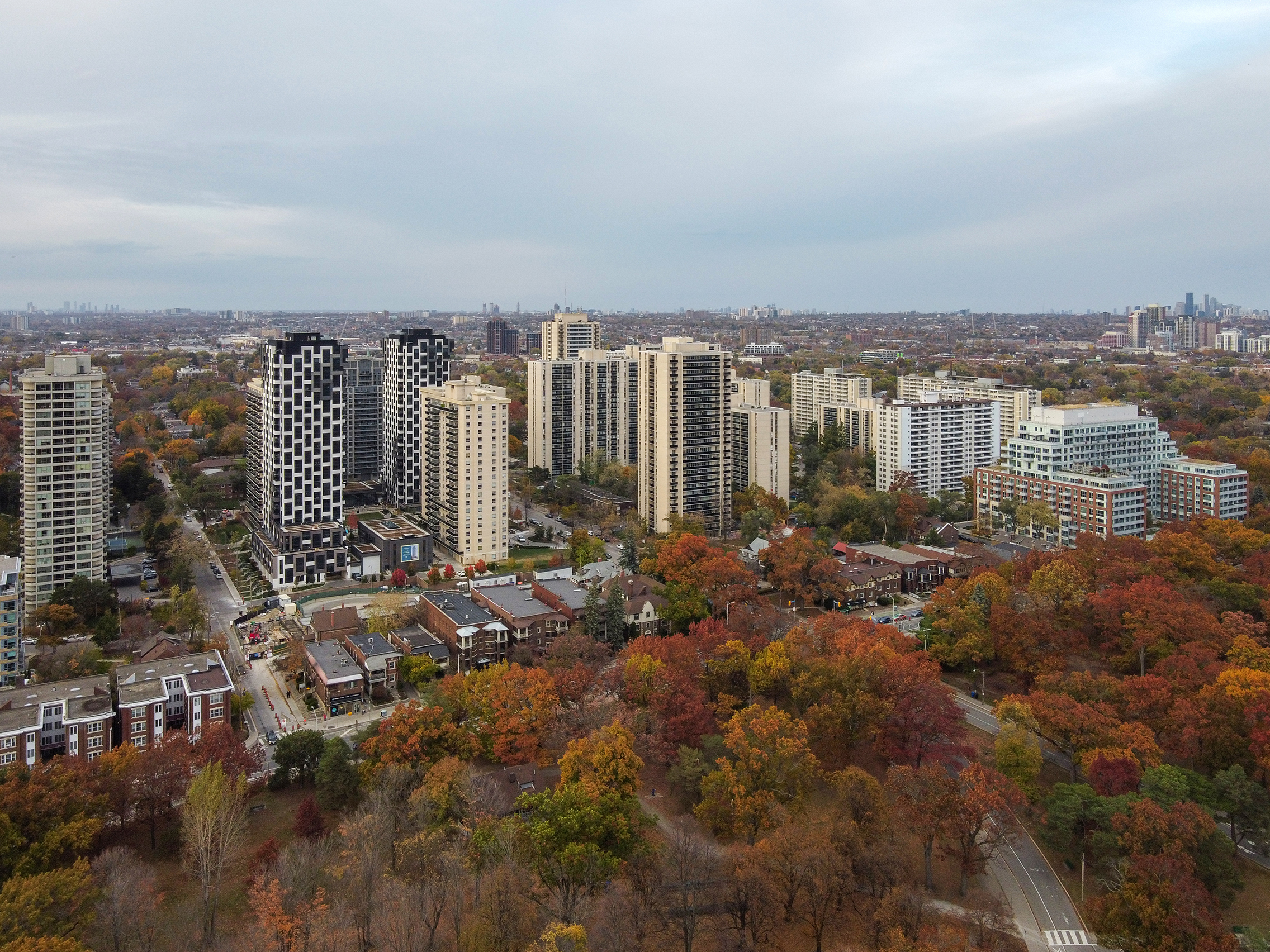
High Park North

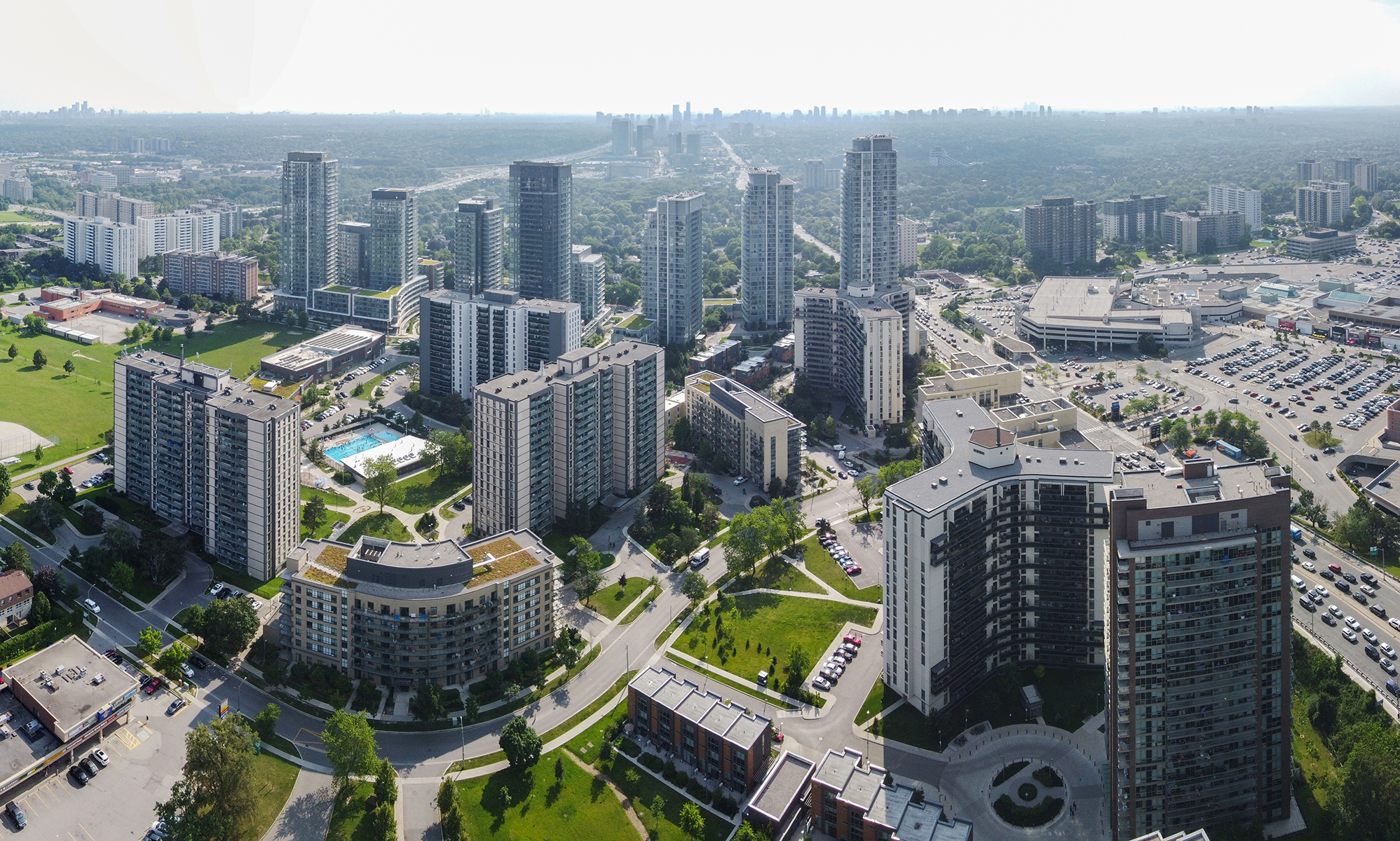
Parkway Forest

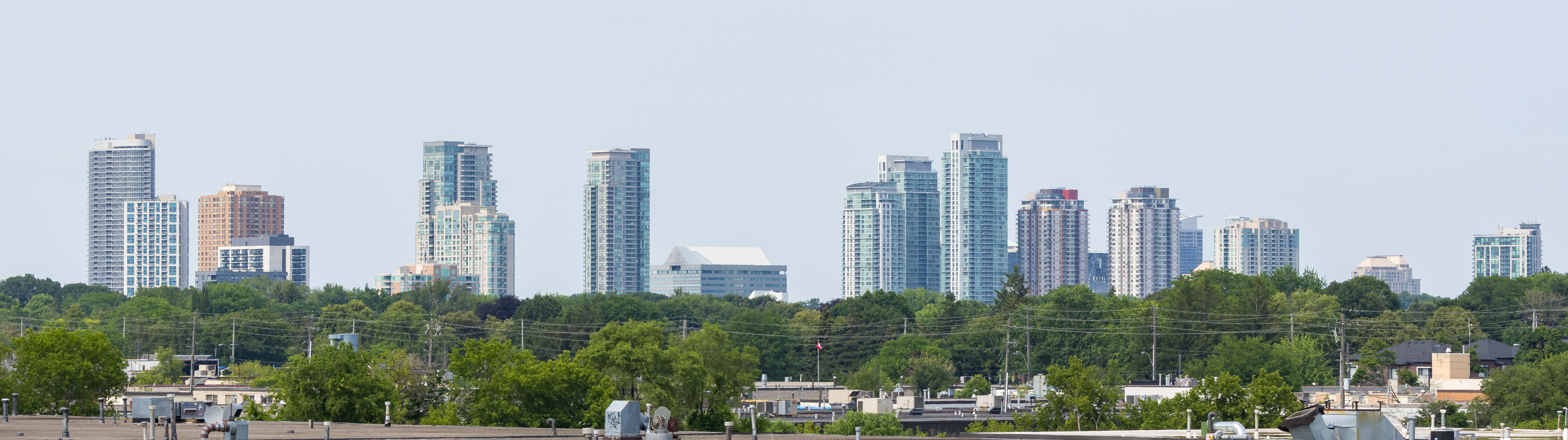
Scarborough City Centre

== See also ==
- List of tallest buildings in Canada
- List of tallest buildings in Ottawa–Gatineau
- List of tallest buildings in Hamilton, Ontario
- List of tallest buildings in Mississauga
- List of tallest buildings in Niagara Falls, Ontario
- List of tallest buildings in London, Ontario
- List of tallest buildings in Vaughan
- List of tallest buildings in Windsor, Ontario
- Architecture of Toronto
- Eaton's / John Maryon Tower in Downtown Toronto, which was proposed to be the world's tallest building at the time, later replaced with College Park
- Manhattanization
- UrbanToronto (a blog and online forum for discussion of buildings in Toronto and other Toronto-related topics)
