= List of tallest buildings in Canada =

Skyline of Downtown Toronto in 2026. Visible are First Canadian Place, Canada's tallest completed building (centre-right), Canada's future tallest building, SkyTower at Pinnacle One Yonge, nearing completion (right); and CN Tower, Canada's tallest structure (left)

Canada's tallest buildings include many of the tallest structures in North America outside of the United States. Since 1975, the tallest completed building in Canada has been First Canadian Place in Toronto, which rises to a height of 298 m (978 ft). SkyTower at Pinnacle One Yonge, a supertall skyscraper under construction in Toronto, is expected to become Canada's tallest building upon its planned completion in 2026. While not a habitable building, the tallest free-standing structure in Canada is Toronto's CN Tower, which is 553.3 m (1,815 ft) tall. As Canada's largest city, Toronto is home to many of Canada's tallest buildings, including its eight tallest. The tallest building in Canada outside of Toronto is Stantec Tower in Edmonton, which has a height of 249 m (817 ft).

Most of Canada's tallest buildings are located in the metropolitan areas of Toronto, Montreal, Vancouver, Calgary, and Edmonton, including all but one of the 100 of the buildings in this page. The exception is Hilton Niagara Falls Tower 2, the tallest building in Niagara Falls. In the Greater Toronto Area, skyscrapers surpassing a height of 180 m (590 ft) have been built in Mississauga and Vaughan since the 2010s. In Greater Vancouver, the city of Burnaby is home to several skyscrapers taller than Living Shangri-La, the tallest building in the city of Vancouver itself, due to Vancouver's height restriction laws. Ottawa, Canada's capital, does not make an appearance on this list due to its relatively stringent height restriction laws.

Five of Canada's ten largest cities enforce height restriction laws to varying degrees. In Ottawa, skyscrapers could not be built above the height of the Peace Tower until the late 1970s, when the restriction was changed so that no building could overwhelm the skyline. In Montreal, skyscrapers cannot be built above 200 m (656 ft) of height nor the elevation of Mount Royal. The City of Vancouver has enacted "view corridors" which limit the height of buildings in most areas of downtown. Edmonton had an elevation restriction, approximately 150 m (492 ft) above downtown, due to the proximity of the city centre airport, until it closed in November 2013. Buildings in Calgary must not cast shadows on the Bow River between 10:00 AM and 4:00 PM on the equinox, to maintain sunlit summer hours.

== Tallest buildings ==
This list ranks the 100 tallest completed buildings in Canada, based on standard height measurement. This includes spires and architectural details but does not include antenna masts. The “Year” column indicates the year of completion. Buildings tied in height are sorted by year of completion with earlier buildings ranked first, and then alphabetically.

Was the tallest building in Canada upon completion

Rank	Name	Image	City	Height m (ft)	Floors	Year	Purpose	Notes
N/A	CN Tower		Toronto (Ontario) 43°38′33″N 79°23′13″W	553.3 (1815.3)	114	1976	Mixed-use	Tallest free-standing structure in Canada since 1976. Included for comparison purposes.
1	SkyTower at Pinnacle One Yonge		Toronto (Ontario) 43°38′37″N 79°22′30″W	351.4 (1153)	106	2026	Mixed-use	Interior construction has yet to be finished. The exterior is completely done, making it the tallest building in Canada, even though still unused.
2	First Canadian Place		Toronto (Ontario) 43°38′56″N 79°22′54″W	298.1 (978)	72	1975	Office	Tallest building in Canada from 1975 until 2025. 8th-tallest building in the world at the time of its completion. Tallest building in the world outside Chicago and New York City at the time of its completion. Tallest building completed in Toronto in the 1970s. Formerly known as First Bank Tower.
3	The St. Regis Toronto		Toronto (Ontario) 43°38′59″N 79°22′49″W	276.9 (908)	63	2012	Mixed-use	Tallest mixed-use building in Canada. Tallest building completed in Toronto in the 2010s. Formerly known as Trump International Hotel & Tower Toronto and later as The Adelaide Hotel.
4	Scotia Plaza		Toronto (Ontario) 43°38′58″N 79°22′46″W	275 (902)	68	1988	Office	Tallest building completed in Toronto in the 1980s.
5	Aura		Toronto (Ontario) 43°39′34″N 79°22′58″W	271.9 (892)	78	2014	Residential	Tallest residential building in Toronto and in Canada.
6	TD Canada Trust Tower		Toronto (Ontario) 43°38′47″N 79°22′44″W	260.9 (856)	53	1990	Office	Tallest building completed in Toronto in the 1990s.
7	M3		Mississauga (Ontario) 43°35′01″N 79°38′47″W	260.3 (854)	81	2026	Residential	Tallest building in Mississauga. Tallest building in Canada outside of Toronto.
8	One Bloor East		Toronto (Ontario) 43°40′12″N 79°23′10″W	257.3 (844)	78	2017	Residential	
9	Stantec Tower	Stantec Tower	Edmonton (Alberta) 53°32′42″N 113°29′46″W	248.9 (817)	66	2019	Mixed-use	Tallest building in Canada outside of the Greater Toronto Area. Also tallest in Edmonton, in Alberta, and in Western Canada since 2019. Tallest building completed in Edmonton in the 2010s.
10	Brookfield Place East	Brookfield Place East	Calgary (Alberta) 51°02′50″N 114°03′58″W	247 (810)	56	2017	Office	Tallest building in Calgary. Tallest building completed in the 2010s.
11	CIBC Square II		Toronto (Ontario) 43°38′43″N 79°22′44″W	243.1 (798)	53	2026	Office	
12	CIBC Square I		Toronto (Ontario) 43°38′39″N 79°22′40″W	241.3 (792)	49	2021	Office	
13	Commerce Court West		Toronto (Ontario) 43°38′54″N 79°22′46″W	239 (784)	57	1973	Office	Tallest building in Toronto and in Canada from 1972 to 1975.
14	The Bow	The Bow	Calgary (Alberta) 51°02′53″N 114°03′43″W	237.5 (779)	58	2012	Office	Tallest building in Calgary from 2012 until 2017, when it was overtaken by Brookfield Place East.
15	TD Terrace		Toronto (Ontario) 43°38′43″N 79°23′04″W	236.5 (776)	48	2024	Office	
16	ICE Condominiums II		Toronto (Ontario) 43°38′31″N 79°22′54″W	234.2 (768)	67	2015	Residential	
17	Harbour Plaza East		Toronto (Ontario) 43°38′32″N 79°22′44″W	233 (764)	71	2017	Residential	
18	Concord Canada House 1		Toronto (Ontario) 43°38′29″N 79°23′32″W	231.3 (759)	83	2025	Residential	
19	Sugar Wharf Tower G		Toronto (Ontario) 43°38′41″N 79°22′18″W	230.2 (755)	70	2023	Residential	Also known as Sugar Wharf Tower II.
20	Eau du Soleil Sky Tower		Toronto (Ontario) 43°37′24″N 79°28′48″W	228.2 (749)	66	2019	Residential	Canada's tallest building outside a central business district.
21	1250 René-Lévesque		Montreal (Quebec) 45°29′49″N 73°34′13″W	226.5 (743)	47	1992	Office	Originally known as the IBM-Marathon Tower. The roof height is 199 m. Tallest building in Montreal & Quebec since 1992. Tallest building completed in Montreal in the 1990s.
22	Telus Sky	Telus Sky	Calgary (Alberta) 51°02′48″N 114°03′49″W	225.4 (740)	60	2020	Mixed-use	Tallest building completed in Calgary in the 2020s. Tallest mixed-use building in Calgary.
23	Harbour Plaza West		Toronto (Ontario) 43°38′32″N 79°22′47″W	224 (735)	67	2017	Residential	
24	Ten York		Toronto (Ontario) 43°38′28″N 79°22′52″W	224 (735)	65	2018	Residential	
25	TD Bank Tower		Toronto (Ontario) 43°38′51″N 79°22′52″W	222.8 (731)	56	1967	Office	Tallest building in Toronto and in Canada from 1967 to 1972. Tallest building completed in Toronto in the 1960s. Also known simply as TD Tower.
26	11 YV	–	Toronto (Ontario) 43°40′17″N 79°23′18″W	221.91 (728)	66	2025	Residential	
27	Sugar Wharf Tower F		Toronto (Ontario) 43°38′40″N 79°22′16″W	218.4 (717)	66	2023	Residential	
28	Prestige at Pinnacle One Yonge		Toronto (Ontario) 43°38′37″N 79°22′27″W	216.2 (709)	65	2022	Residential	
29	Two Gilmore Place		Burnaby (British Columbia) 49°15′57″N 123°00′50″W	215.8 (708)	64	2024	Residential	Tallest building in Brentwood Park, in Burnaby, in Greater Vancouver, and in British Columbia. The second in the province to exceed 200 metres in height. Tallest building completed in Burnaby in the 2020s. Part of the three-tower Gilmore Place development.
30	Suncor Energy Centre - West	Suncor Energy Centre	Calgary (Alberta) 51°02′53″N 114°03′53″W	215.2 (706)	53	1984	Office	Tallest building in Calgary from 1984 until 2012, when it was overtaken by The Bow.
31	Bay Adelaide Centre West		Toronto (Ontario) 43°39′01″N 79°22′50″W	214.7 (704)	52	2009	Office	Tallest building completed in Toronto in the 2000s.
32	Shangri-La Toronto		Toronto (Ontario) 43°38′57″N 79°23′10″W	214 (702)	65	2012	Mixed-use	
33	Eighth Avenue Place I		Calgary (Alberta) 51°02′43″N 114°04′21″W	212.3 (697)	51	2011	Office	
34	Ritz-Carlton Toronto		Toronto (Ontario) 43°38′43″N 79°23′13″W	209.5 (687)	54	2011	Mixed-use	
35	488 University Avenue		Toronto (Ontario) 43°39′18″N 79°23′20″W	207.6 (681)	57	2019	Mixed-use	Also known as Residences of 488 University.
36	Bay-Wellington Tower		Toronto (Ontario) 43°38′51″N 79°22′42″W	207 (679)	49	1991	Office	
37	1000 de La Gauchetière	1000 de La Gauchetière	Montreal (Quebec) 45°29′54″N 73°33′59″W	205 (673)	51	1992	Office	Tallest building in Montreal by roof height. It reaches the maximum roof height allowed by the city within viewing distance of the Mount Royal look off point.
38	L Tower		Toronto (Ontario) 43°38′46″N 79°22′35″W	205 (673)	59	2015	Residential	
39	Massey Tower		Toronto (Ontario) 43°39′13″N 79°22′45″W	204.2 (670)	62	2019	Residential	
40	Four Seasons Hotel and Residences West		Toronto (Ontario) 43°40′18″N 79°23′24″W	204 (669)	55	2012	Mixed-Use	
41	ICE Condominiums I		Toronto (Ontario) 43°38′30″N 79°22′55″W	202.3 (664)	57	2014	Residential	
42	Concord Canada House 2		Toronto (Ontario) 43°38′28″N 79°23′34″W	202.2 (663)	59	2025	Residential	
43	YC Condominiums		Toronto (Ontario) 43°39′43″N 79°23′01″W	202.2 (663)	60	2018	Residential	
44	Maestria Tour B		Montreal (Quebec) 45°30′23″N 73°33′55″W	202 (663)	61	2025	Residential	Tallest twin towers in Montreal, alongside Maestria Tour A.
45	Living Shangri-La		Vancouver (British Columbia) 49°17′08″N 123°07′25″W	200.9 (659)	62	2009	Mixed-use	2nd tallest building in British Columbia. Contains a hotel on the first 15 floors and residential units on the rest of the tower. Will soon rebrand to the Hyatt Vancouver Downtown Alberni. Tallest building completed in Vancouver in the 2000s.
46	M2		Mississauga (Ontario) 43°35′01″N 79°38′39″W	200 (656)	62	2023	Residential	Part of the M City Condominiums complex. First building in Mississauga to exceed 200 m (656 ft) in height.
47	Victoria sur le Parc		Montreal (Quebec) 45°30′00″N 73°33′41″W	200 (656)	58	2024	Residential	Tallest residential building in Montreal and in Canada east of Toronto. So far, the tallest building completed in Montreal during the 2020s.
48	Banque Nationale Headquarters		Montreal (Quebec) 45°29′57″N 73°33′42″W	200 (656)	40	2024	Office	
49	Skyla		Montreal (Quebec) 45°29′52″N 73°33′48″W	200 (656)	63	2025	Residential	Also known by its street address, 900 Saint-Jacques.
50	M1		Mississauga (Ontario) 43°35′05″N 79°38′42″W	199.2 (654)	62	2023	Residential	Part of the M City Condominiums complex.
51	88 Scott		Toronto (Ontario) 43°38′54″N 79°22′35″W	198.2 (650)	58	2017	Residential	
52	1 Square Phillips		Montreal (Quebec) 45°30′15″N 73°34′00″W	198 (650)	61	2025	Residential	
53	Bankers Hall - East	Bankers Hall - East	Calgary (Alberta) 51°02′43″N 114°04′06″W	197 (646)	52	1989	Office	
54	Bankers Hall - West	Bankers Hall - West	Calgary (Alberta) 51°02′43″N 114°04′10″W	197 (646)	52	2000	Office	Tallest building completed in Calgary in the 2000s.
55	Bay Adelaide Centre East		Toronto (Ontario) 43°39′03″N 79°22′46″W	196 (643)	44	2016	Office	
56	E Condos South		Toronto (Ontario) 43°42′27″N 79°23′53″W	195.7 (642)	58	2019	Residential	Also known as E Condominiums.
57	Wellesley on the Park		Toronto (Ontario) 43°39′52″N 79°23′07″W	194.2 (637)	60	2021	Residential	
58	2221 Yonge	–	Toronto (Ontario) 43°42′22″N 79°23′51″W	192.5 (632)	58	2021	Residential	
59	JW Marriott Edmonton	JW Marriott Edmonton	Edmonton (Alberta) 53°32′44.7″N 113°29′45.9″W	191 (627)	56	2018	Mixed-use	Tallest building in Edmonton briefly in 2019.
60	Tour de la Bourse	Tour de la Bourse	Montreal (Quebec) 45°30′02″N 73°33′42″W	190 (620)	47	1964	Office	The tallest building in Canada until completion of the Toronto-Dominion Bank Tower in Toronto. The tallest reinforced concrete building in the world until the completion of Lake Point Tower in Chicago. The tallest building constructed in Montreal in the 1960s. Tallest building in Montreal from 1964 to 1992; tallest building completed in Montreal in the 1960s.
61	CG Tower		Vaughan (Ontario) 43°47′44″N 79°31′19″W	189.8 (623)	59	2024	Residential	Tallest building in Vaughan. Tallest building in Ontario outside of Toronto and Mississauga. Tallest building completed in Vaughan in the 2020s.
62	EY Tower		Toronto (Ontario) 43°39′01″N 79°22′57″W	188.2 (617)	40	2017	Office	
63	Place Ville-Marie	Place Ville-Marie	Montreal (Quebec) 45°30′05″N 73°34′06″W	188 (617)	47	1962	Office	Briefly the tallest building in Montreal and in Canada until completion of the Tour de la Bourse in 1964.
64	Paradox Hotel Vancouver		Vancouver (British Columbia) 49°17′12″N 123°07′26″W	187.8 (616)	60	2016	Mixed-use	Tied with Altus in Burnaby for the third tallest building in British Columbia. Tallest building completed in Vancouver in the 2010s. Mixed-use hotel and residential building.
65	Solo District - Altus		Burnaby (British Columbia) 49°15′58″N 123°00′13″W	187.8 (616)	49	2017	Mixed-use	Tallest building in Burnaby from 2017 to 2024. Mixed-use residential and hotel building. Tallest mixed-use building in Burnaby. Tied with the Paradox Hotel Vancouver for the third tallest building in British Columbia.
66	Festival Tower A		Vaughan (Ontario) 43°47′31″N 79°31′58″W	187.6 (615)	59	2025	Residential	Also known as Festival Condominiums I.
67	Toronto House		Toronto (Ontario) 43°38′53″N 79°23′18″W	186.5 (612)	58	2024	Mixed-use	
68	Brentwood One		Burnaby (British Columbia) 49°16′04″N 123°00′09″W	186.2 (611)	56	2019	Residential	
69	Brentwood Two		Burnaby (British Columbia) 49°16′00″N 123°00′03″W	186.2 (611)	56	2019	Residential	
70	RBC Centre		Toronto (Ontario) 43°38′44″N 79°23′09″W	184.9 (607)	42	2009	Office	
71	Maestria Tour A		Montreal (Quebec) 45°30′23″N 73°33′58″W	184.7 (606)	58	2025	Residential	Tallest twin towers in Montreal, alongside Maestria Tour B.
72	Casa II	–	Toronto (Ontario) 43°40′10″N 79°23′03″W	184.5 (605)	57	2016	Residential	
73	L'Avenue	L/Avenue	Montreal (Quebec) 45°29′47″N 73°34′14″W	184.4 (605)	50	2017	Mixed-use	Mixed-use office and residential building. Tallest building completed in Montreal in the 2010s.
74	CIBC Tower	CIBC Tower	Montreal (Quebec) 45°29′55″N 73°34′16″W	184 (604)	45	1962	Office	With its antenna included it measures 225 m (738 ft). The tallest building in Canada and the whole British Commonwealth when completed in 1962. Surpassed within a year by Place Ville-Marie.
75	U Condominiums East Tower		Toronto (Ontario) 43°40′01″N 79°23′19″W	184 (604)	55	2016	Residential	Also known as U Condominiums II.
76	1 Yorkville	–	Toronto (Ontario) 43°40′18″N 79°23′16″W	183.2 (601)	58	2020	Residential	
77	TD North Tower		Toronto (Ontario) 43°38′53″N 79°22′55″W	182.9 (600)	46	1969	Office	
78	Hillside East C at Concord Brentwood	–	Burnaby (British Columbia) 49°15′54″N 122°59′39″W	182.9 (600)	55	2024	Residential	
79	Centennial Place - East	Centennial Place	Calgary (Alberta) 51°03′03″N 114°04′20″W	182.6 (599)	41	2010	Office	Also known as Centennial Place I.
80	Water's Edge at the Cove	–	Toronto (Ontario) 43°37′34″N 79°28′43″W	182.3 (598)	56	2025	Residential	
81	Brentwood Three		Burnaby (British Columbia) 49°16′00″N 122°59′58″W	182 (597)	55	2021	Residential	
82	Maple Leaf Square North Tower		Toronto (Ontario) 43°38′34″N 79°22′50″W	181.3 (595)	54	2010	Residential	
83	8 Wellesley	–	Toronto (Ontario) 43°39′54″N 79°23′07″W	181.2 (594)	55	2025	Residential	
84	Eau Du Soleil Water Tower	–	Toronto (Ontario) 43°37′24″N 79°28′44″W	180.8 (593)	49	2019	Residential	
85	Transit City Condominiums 3		Vaughan (Ontario) 43°47′52″N 79°31′41″W	179.8 (590)	57	2021	Residential	Tallest building in Vaughan from 2021 to 2024.
86	Casa III	–	Toronto (Ontario) 43°40′10″N 79°23′01″W	179.6 (589)	55	2018	Residential	Also known as Casa III Condominiums & Fifty Nine Hayden.
87	Rosedale on Bloor	–	Toronto (Ontario) 43°40′19″N 79°22′39″W	179 (587)	52	2022	Residential	
88	The Butterfly		Vancouver (British Columbia) 49°16′55″N 123°07′36″W	178.6 (586)	57	2024	Residential	Tallest building completed in Vancouver in the 2020s.
89	INDX Tower	–	Toronto (Ontario) 43°39′03″N 79°22′56″W	178.2 (585)	54	2016	Residential	
90	Pier West 1		New Westminster (British Columbia) 49°12′04″N 122°54′32″W	178 (584)	53	2024	Residential	Tallest building in New Westminster.
91	Festival Tower C		Vaughan (Ontario) 43°47′32″N 79°31′53″W	177.6 (583)	55	2024	Residential	Also known as Festival Condominiums III.
92	Hilton Niagara Falls Tower 2		Niagara Falls (Ontario) 43°04′59″N 79°05′00″W	177.1 (581)	58	2009	Hotel	Tallest building in Niagara Falls. Also known as Niagara Falls Hilton Fallsview North Tower.
93	Vita on the Lake	–	Toronto (Ontario) 43°37′29″N 79°28′45″W	177.1 (581)	53	2021	Residential	
94	Canterra Tower	Canterra Tower	Calgary (Alberta) 51°03′04″N 114°04′15″W	177 (581)	45	1988	Office	
95	TransCanada Tower	TransCanada Tower	Calgary (Alberta) 51°02′57″N 114°03′52″W	177 (581)	38	2001	Office	
96	Transit City Condominiums 2		Vaughan (Ontario) 43°47′48″N 79°31′45″W	177 (581)	56	2021	Residential	Part of the Transit City development.
97	Highline	–	Burnaby (British Columbia) 49°13′28″N 123°00′10″W	177 (581)	53	2024	Mixed-use	Mixed-use residential and hotel building. Tallest building in Metrotown. Formerly called The Eclipse. The hotel component is known as Hyatt Place Metrotown.
98	88 Queen Street East	–	Toronto (Ontario) 43°39′13″N 79°22′30″W	177 (581)	57	2025	Residential	
99	Eighth Avenue Place II	Eighth Avenue Place II	Calgary (Alberta) 51°02′44″N 114°04′24″W	176.7 (580)	41	2014	Office	Also known as Eighth Avenue Place West Tower.
100	Transit City Condominiums 1		Vaughan 43°47′51″N 79°31′45″W	176.5 (579)	56	2021	Residential	Part of the Transit City development.

== Tallest under construction ==
The following table includes buildings under construction in Canada that would rank among the 100 tallest buildings in Canada if completed. The “Year” column indicates the expected year of completion. Buildings that are on hold are not included.

Rank	Name	City	Height m (ft)	Floors	Year	Purpose	Notes
1	One Bloor West (The One)	Toronto	308.6 (1012)	85	2028	Mixed-use	Construction has reached final height, exterior has not been finished
1	Concord Sky (391 Yonge Street)	Toronto	300.2 (985)	85	2027	Residential	
2	Forma East Tower (260 King Street West)	Toronto	266.5 (874)	74	2028	Residential	
3	M3	Mississauga	260.3 (854)	81	2026	Residential	Will become the tallest building in Mississauga upon completion.
4	Exchange District Condos, EX4	Mississauga	232 (761)	72	2027	Residential	
5	Sky Park	Burnaby	230.1 (755)	65	2026	Residential	Would become the tallest building in Burnaby upon completion.
6	8 Elm Street	Toronto	220.3 (723)	69	2026	Residential	
7	The Pemberton (33 Yorkville Avenue)	Toronto	215.8 (708)	68	2026	Residential	
8	M4	Mississauga	215.6 (707)	67	2028	Residential	
9	Citizen	Burnaby	210.8 (692)	66	2027	Residential	
10	Solo District Aerius	Burnaby	203.3 (667)	52	2026	Residential	
11	Exchange District Condos, EX1	Mississauga	201 (659)	60	2026	Residential	
12	Q Tower (200 Queens Quay West)	Toronto	197.4 (648)	59	2029	Residential	
13	Brentwood Five	Burnaby	182 (597)	53	2027	Residential	
14	The United BLDG (481 University Avenue)	Toronto	179.5 (589)	54	2027	Mixed-use	

== Tallest demolished buildings ==
This table lists buildings in Canada that were demolished or destroyed and at one time stood at least 60 metres (197 ft) in height.

Rank	Name	Image	City	Height m (ft)	Floors	Year completed	Year demolished	Notes
1	Empire Landmark Hotel		Vancouver	120.1 (394)	42	1973	2019	This building was the tallest free standing hotel in the city. This building was often referred to by its original name, the Sheraton Landmark. The hotel and its restaurant closed on September 30, 2017 and the building was demolished, floor by floor between March 2018 and May 2019.
2	Old Toronto Star Building		Toronto	88.1 (289)	22	1929	1972	This building was one of the tallest buildings in Toronto upon completion in 1929. Demolished to make way for First Canadian Place.
3	Owasina Hall		Calgary	83.5 (274)	22	1972	2016	The high-rise student residential building had been sitting vacant since 2006. Demolished to make way for a new building complex at SAIT.
4	Hotel Vancouver (1916)		Vancouver	77.1 (253)	15	1916	1949	This building was one of the tallest buildings in Vancouver upon completion in 1916.
5	Laurentian Hotel		Montreal	75 (246)	20	1948	1978	
6	Inn on the Park		Toronto	72.5 (238)	23	1971	2016	The hotel ceased operating in 2005 and the original hotel, restaurants and convention centre were demolished in 2006, the day before the Toronto city council was to have debated declaring it a heritage site. Demolition of the remaining tower began in 2014 and was completed in 2016.
7	Architects' Building		Montreal	63.8 (209)	20	1931	1968	

== Timeline of the tallest buildings ==
Since the 19th century, only two cities have had tallest building in Canada – Montreal and Toronto.

Name	Image	City	Years as tallest	Height m (ft)	Floors	Reference
Notre Dame Basilica	Basilique Notre-Dame	Montreal	1829–1874	68.9 (226)	7	
St James Cathedral (Spire Completion)		Toronto	1874–1899	92.9 (305)	N/A	
Toronto City Hall		Toronto	1899–1928	103.6 (340)	7	
Tour de la Banque Royale	Tour de la Banque Royale	Montreal	1928–1929	121 (397)	22	
Fairmont Royal York Hotel	Royal York Hotel	Toronto	1929–1931	134 (440)	28	
Commerce Court North	Commerce Court North	Toronto	1931–1962	145 (476)	34	
Tour CIBC	Tour CIBC	Montreal	1962	184 (604)	45	
Place Ville-Marie	Place Ville-Marie	Montreal	1962–1964	188 (617)	44	
Tour de la Bourse		Montreal	1964–1967	190 (623)	47	
TD Bank Tower	Toronto-Dominion Centre	Toronto	1967–1972	222.8 (731)	56	
Commerce Court West	Commerce Court West	Toronto	1972–1975	239 (784)	57	
First Canadian Place	First Canadian Place	Toronto	1975–2026	298.1 (978)	72	
SkyTower at Pinnacle One Yonge (1 Yonge Street)		Toronto	2026–Present	351.4 (1,153)	106	

== Tallest building by city ==
This list ranks Canadian cities by the height of their tallest building by standard height measurement. This includes spires and architectural details but does not include antenna masts. Cities whose tallest building is at least 50 m (164 ft) tall are included. Heights in italics are minimum estimates based on the number of floors.

Rank	City	Province	Building	Image	Height m (ft)	Floors	Year	Reference
1	Toronto	Ontario	SkyTower at Pinnacle One Yonge	SkyTower at Pinnacle One Yonge	351.4 (1,153)	106	2026	
2	Mississauga	Ontario	M3	–	260.3 (854)	81	2026	
3	Edmonton	Alberta	Stantec Tower	Stantec Tower	248.9 (817)	66	2019	
4	Calgary	Alberta	Brookfield Place East	Brookfield Place East	247 (810)	56	2017	
5	Montreal	Quebec	1250 René-Lévesque	1250 René-Lévesque	226.5 (743)	47	1992	
6	Burnaby	British Columbia	Two Gilmore Place		215.8 (708)	64	2024	
7	Vancouver	British Columbia	Living Shangri-La	Living Shangri-La	200.9 (659)	62	2009	
8	Vaughan	Ontario	CG Tower		189.3 (621)	61	2024	
9	New Westminster	British Columbia	Pier West 1		178 (584)	53	2024	
10	Niagara Falls	Ontario	Hilton Niagara Falls Tower 2	Hilton Niagara Falls	177.1 (581)	58	2009	
11	Coquitlam	British Columbia	567 Clarke & Como		162.2 (532)	49	2021	
12	Surrey	British Columbia	3 Civic Plaza	3 Civic Plaza Tower	157.3 (516)	50	2018	
13	Ottawa	Ontario	Claridge Icon	Claridge Icon	143 (469)	45	2022	
14	Winnipeg	Manitoba	300 Main		142 (466)	42	2022	
15	Kelowna	British Columbia	The Eli at Water Street by the Park	–	137.8 (452)	42	2025	
16	London	Ontario	Centro South Tower		135.3 (444)	40	2025	
17	Kitchener	Ontario	DTK Condos		130.7 (429)	39	2022	
18	Hamilton	Ontario	Landmark Place		127 (417)	43	1974	
19	Quebec City	Quebec	Édifice Marie-Guyart	Édifice Marie-Guyart	126.5 (415)	33	1972	
20	Markham	Ontario	Riverview III at Uptown Markham	–	126 (413) (Note: Sources do not state the exact height of this building. This figure is an estimate based on the number of above-ground floors, based on a height of 3 metres (9.8 feet) per floor.)	42	2023	
21	Gatineau	Quebec	Terrasses de la Chaudière	Terrasses de la Chaudière	117 (384)	30	1978	
22	Delta	British Columbia	Delta Rise	–	116.8 (383)	37	2017	
23	Brampton	Ontario	CityPointe Heights I	–	116.4 (382)	35	2026	
24	Barrie	Ontario	Debut Condos 1	–	115.6 (379)	33	2025	
25	Windsor	Ontario	Caesars Windsor Augustus Tower	Augustus Tower	111 (364)	27	2008	
26	Halifax	Nova Scotia	One 77		111 (364)	32	2025	
27	Langley	British Columbia	The Towers of Latimer Heights II	–	109.5 (359)	34	2025	
28	North Vancouver	British Columbia	Apex at Seylynn Village	–	104 (341)	32	2024	
29	Burlington	Ontario	BeauSoliel Condominiums	–	103.7 (340)	29	2026	
30	Westmount	Quebec	Place Alexis-Nihon III	Alexis Nihon Plaza Tower 1	101 (331)	33	1967	
31	Repentigny	Quebec	Résidences Soleil Manoir Repentigny	–	99.1 (325)	30	2023	
32	Brossard	Quebec	Le Jazz Brossard 2	–	96 (315)	26	2023	
33	Laval	Quebec	Sélection Retraite Panorama	–	94.8 (311)	30	2019	
34	Pickering	Ontario	San Francisco 2	–	93 (305)	31	2026	
35	Terrebonne	Quebec	Symbio Terrebonne	–	91 (299)	28	2024	
36	Richmond Hill	Ontario	The Beverly Hills Northwest	–	90 (295)	30	2024	
37	West Vancouver	British Columbia	The Sentinel	–	88.9 (292)	26	2023	
38	Saskatoon	Saskatchewan	Nutrien Tower	Nutrien Tower	88.5 (290)	18	2021	
39	Waterloo	Ontario	Sun Life Financial Building	Sun Life Financial Building	87.5 (287)	18	1987	
40	Port Moody	British Columbia	Aria 2	–	87.5 (287)	26	2008	
41	Oakville	Ontario	Oak & Co. I	–	86.8 (285)	25	2021	
42	Longueuil	Quebec	Port de Mer 1	Port de Mer 1	85.7 (281)	29	1972	
43	Victoria	British Columbia	Hudson Place One	Hudson Place One	84.8 (278)	25	2020	
44	Regina	Saskatchewan	Mosaic Potash Tower	Mosaic Potash Tower	84.5 (277)	20	2013	
45	Abbotsford	British Columbia	Mill Tower	–	83.8 (275)	26	2018	
46	Port Coquitlam	British Columbia	The Shaughnessy	–	83.5 (274)	26	2012	
47	Ajax	Ontario	Vision at Pat Bayly Square I	–	81.1 (266)	25	2018	
48	Moncton	New Brunswick	Assumption Place	Assumption Place	81 (266)	20	1972	
49	White Rock	British Columbia	Soleil		80.7 (265)	26	2024	
50	Oshawa	Ontario	555 Mayfair Avenue	–	78 (256)	26	2026	
51	Nanaimo	British Columbia	The Beacon	–	76 (249)	26	1995	
52	Cambridge	Ontario	Gaslight District Condominiums I	–	75.6 (248)	20	2023	
53	Milton	Ontario	Connectt Condominiums I	–	75 (246)	25	2026	
54	Lévis	Quebec	Le Fitz Tour 1	–	74.8 (245)	25	2024	
55	Saint John	New Brunswick	Brunswick Square & Tower		70.4 (231)	19	1976	
56	Kingston	Ontario	The Madelaine	–	69 (226)	23	2026	
57	Guelph	Ontario	RiverHouse Condominiums	–	68.6 (225)	18	2015	
58	St. Catharines	Ontario	The Shipman I	–	66.8 (219)	20	2021	
59	St. John's	Newfoundland and Labrador	Confederation Building	Confederation Building	64.0 (210)	11	1960	
60	Vaudreuil-Dorion	Quebec	1000 Saint-Charles	–	62.2 (204)	12	1972	
61	Whitby	Ontario	Whitby Place, Tower 1	–	61.3 (201)	21	1979	
62	Sarnia	Ontario	Kenwick Place	–	61 (200)	18	1979	
63	Côte Saint-Luc	Quebec	La Tour Red Top	–	60.7 (199)	20	1975	
64	Sydney	Nova Scotia	Cabot House	–	60.6 (199)	18	1970	
65	Grimsby	Ontario	Odyssey Condominiums	–	60 (197)	22	2023	
66	Yellowknife	Northwest Territories	Centre Square Mall	Centre Square Mall	60.0 (197)	17	1996	
67	Richmond	British Columbia	Sandman Signature Hotel Vancouver Airport South	–	57.3 (188)	18	1983	
68	Brantford	Ontario	Terrace Garden Apartments	–	56.4 (185)	18	1985	
69	Saint-Hyacinthe	Quebec	Sheraton Saint-Hyacinthe Hotel	–	55 (180)	17	2018	
70	Trois-Rivières	Quebec	Place Royale	Place Royale	54.9 (180)	15	1967	
71	Prince Rupert	British Columbia	Highliner Plaza Hotel & Conference Centre	–	54.4 (178)	17	1980	
72	Lethbridge	Alberta	T. Russell Haig Tower	–	54.1 (177)	16	1976	
73	Langford	British Columbia	One Bear Mountain	–	54 (177)	18	2024	
74	Prince Albert	Saskatchewan	Marquis Towers	–	53.9 (177)	16	1974	
75	Sudbury	Ontario	Tom Davies Square	Tom Davies Square	53.9 (177)	12	1977	
76	Newmarket	Ontario	The Davis Residences at Bakerfield	–	52.2 (171)	15	2024	
77	Dorval	Quebec	Westile au Square d'Orval I	–	50.9 (167)	16	2024	
78	Whistler	British Columbia	Fairmont Chateau Whistler	–	50.5 (166)	12	1989	
79	Red Deer	Alberta	Executive Place	–	50 (164)	12	2010	

== See also ==
- List of tallest structures in Canada
- List of cities in Canada with the most skyscrapers
- List of tallest structures in Canada
- List of oldest buildings in Canada
- List of tallest buildings in North America
