= CIBC Square =

Toronto skyscraper

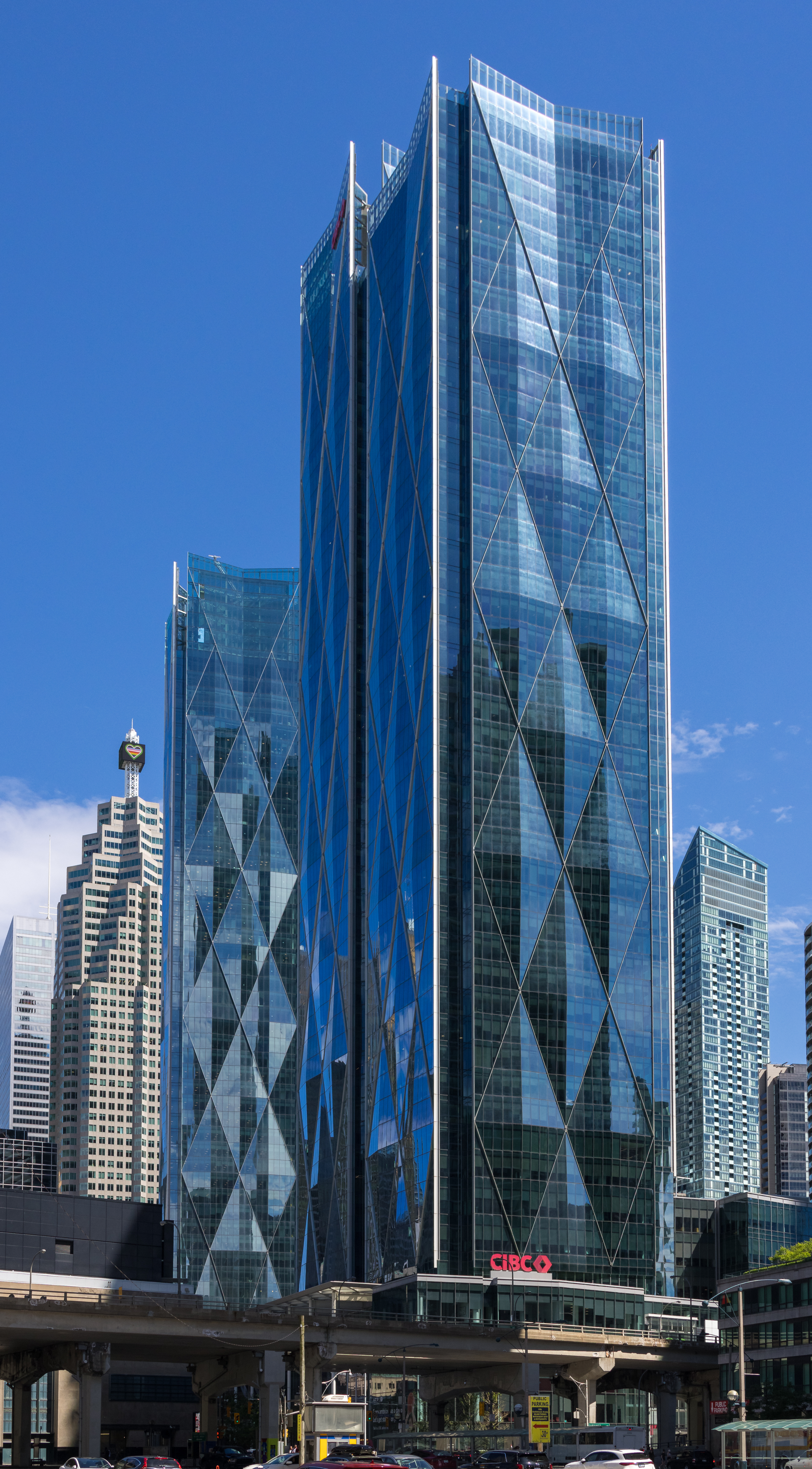
- CIBC Square in June 2026
- Former names: Bay Park Centre

General information
- Status: Completed
- Type: Office building
- Architectural style: Neo-futurism
- Location: 81 & 141 Bay Street, Toronto, Ontario, Canada
- Coordinates: 43°38′39″N 79°22′39″W
- Named for: CIBC
- Groundbreaking: June 21, 2017
- Estimated completion: 2021 (81 Bay Street); 2025 (141 Bay Street)
- Owner: Ivanhoé Cambridge; Hines

Height
- Height: 241.3 m (81 Bay St.)

Technical details
- Floor count: 49 (81 Bay Street); 50 (141 Bay Street)

Design and construction
- Architecture firm: WilkinsonEyre; Adamson Associates
- Developer: Ivanhoé Cambridge; Hines
- Main contractor: EllisDon

Other information
- Public transit: Union Station; Union station

Website
- cibcsquare.com

CIBC Square (known during early stages of development as Bay Park Centre) is an office complex in the South Core neighbourhood of Toronto, Ontario, Canada. The complex, located on Bay Street south of Front Street, is a joint development between Ivanhoé Cambridge and Hines. It serves as the new global operational headquarters for the Canadian Imperial Bank of Commerce (CIBC), consolidating approximately 15,000 staff from several CIBC-tenanted buildings in the Greater Toronto Area, including its existing headquarters at Commerce Court. The development also includes the Union Station Bus Terminal constructed on behalf of Metrolinx for GO Transit, as well as other inter-city bus services, connected directly to Union Station, and a one-acre park elevated over the rail corridor.

== Design ==
The approximately 3,000,000 square feet (280,000 m^{2}) complex will consist of two towers to be completed in two phases.

The 49 storey south tower (81 Bay Street) was completed first, built on the site of a former parking lot opposite the Scotiabank Arena. This tower includes the Union Station Bus Terminal for regional GO Transit and inter-city bus services, replacing the former terminal on Bay Street. A pedestrian skybridge links the complex to Scotiabank Arena and Union Station, expanding the PATH walkway system further south below the railway corridor – to the One Yonge Street complex and ultimately to the under-development Sugar Wharf project on the LCBO lands farther east. Attached to the tower is a four-storey podium housing CIBC's flagship retail bank branch.

The 50-storey north tower (141 Bay Street), built on the site of the former GO Transit bus terminal south of the Dominion Public Building, was completed in 2026.

At the fourth floor level, there is a one-acre, publicly accessible park, elevated over the railway corridor, with year-round activation and varied topography: slopes and hills, horticulture, gardens, shade groves, balconies, and vista areas.

The fourth floor level also includes an operational food hall at 81 Bay Street, branded TABLE Fare + Social and a future food and beverage offering at 141 Bay Street.

The overall complex was designed by British architects WilkinsonEyre, and Adamson Associates of Toronto.

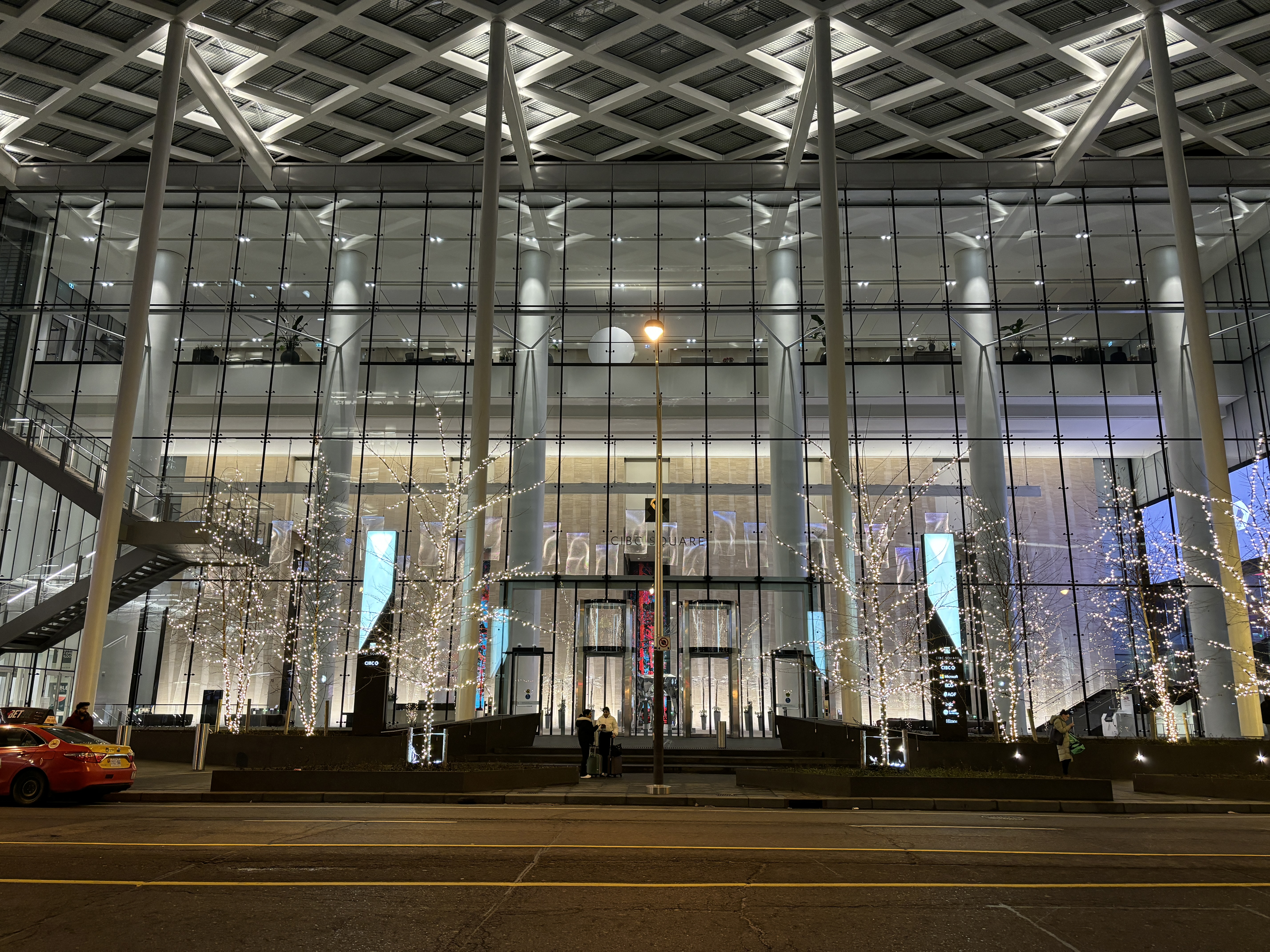
CIBC Square South Entrance

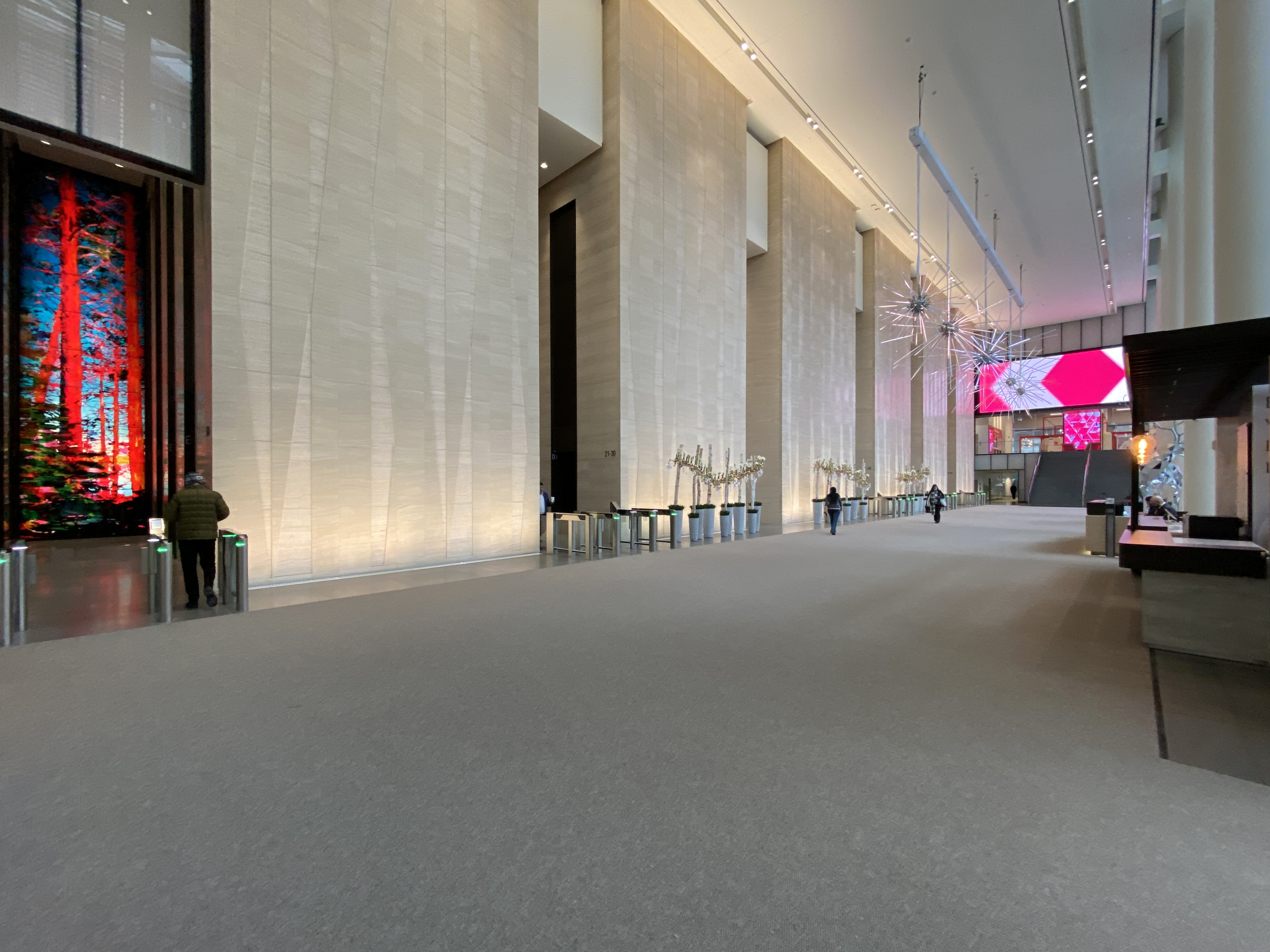
South Tower Office Lobby

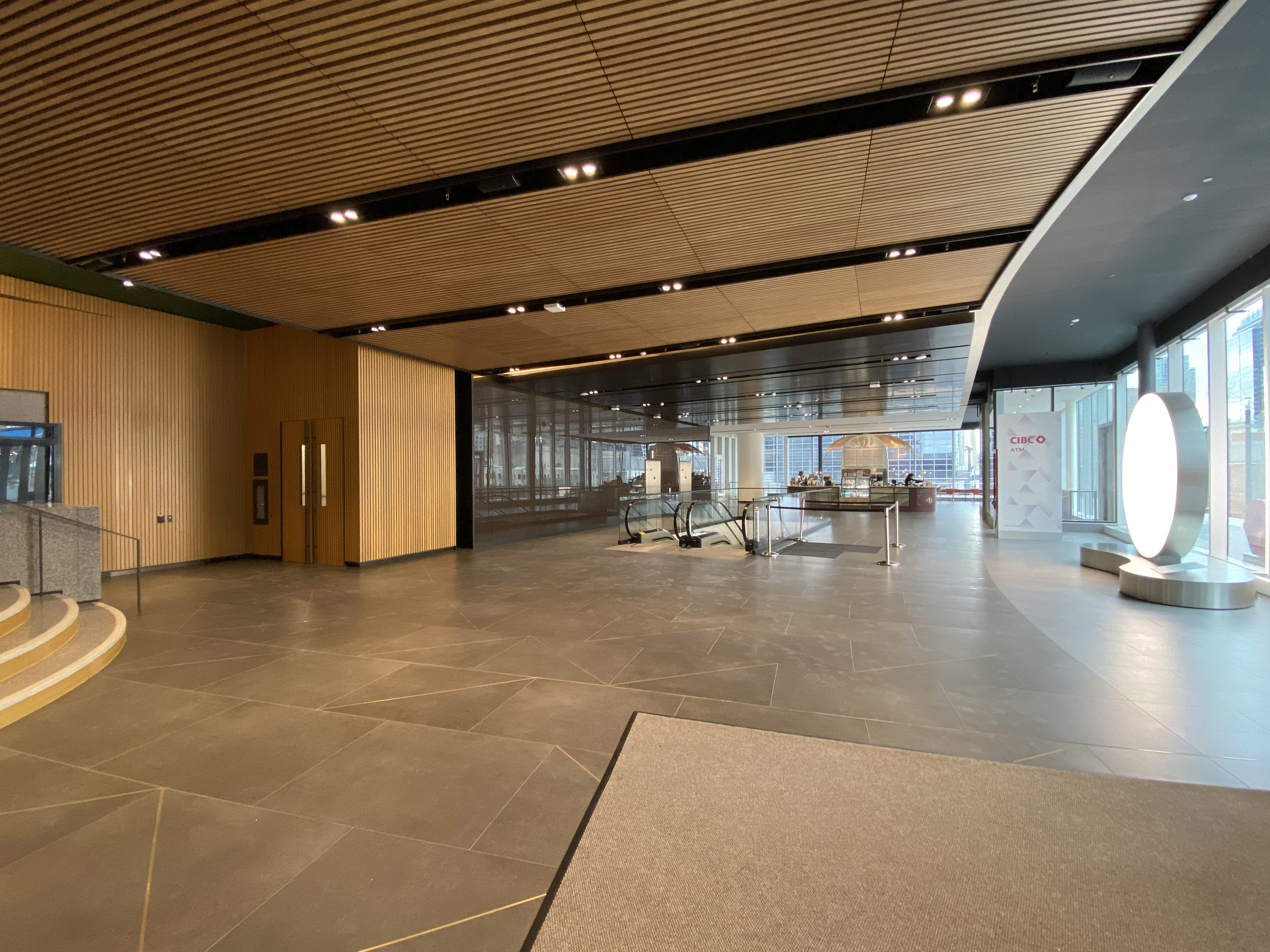
Level 4 cafe and common area

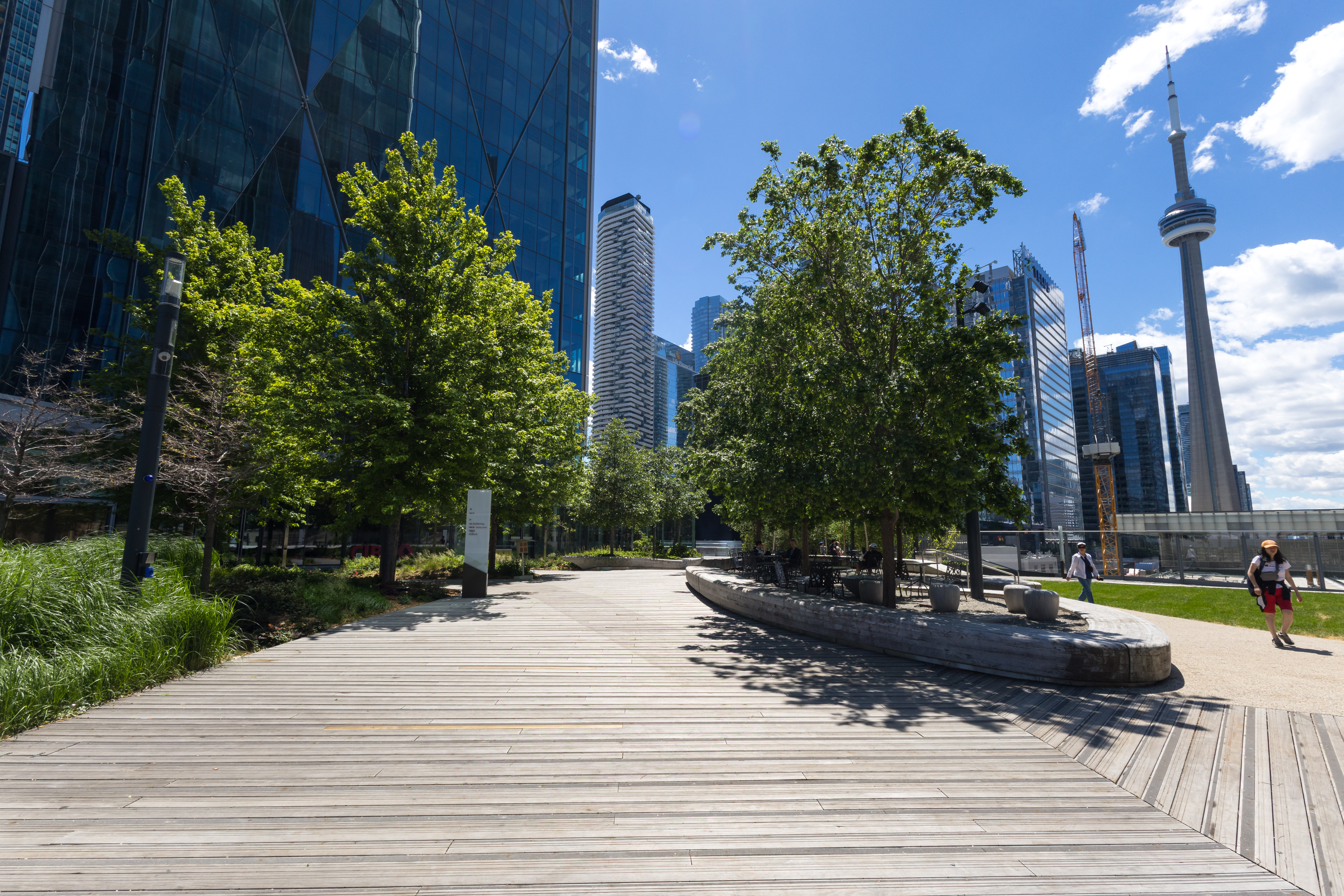
Elevated Park

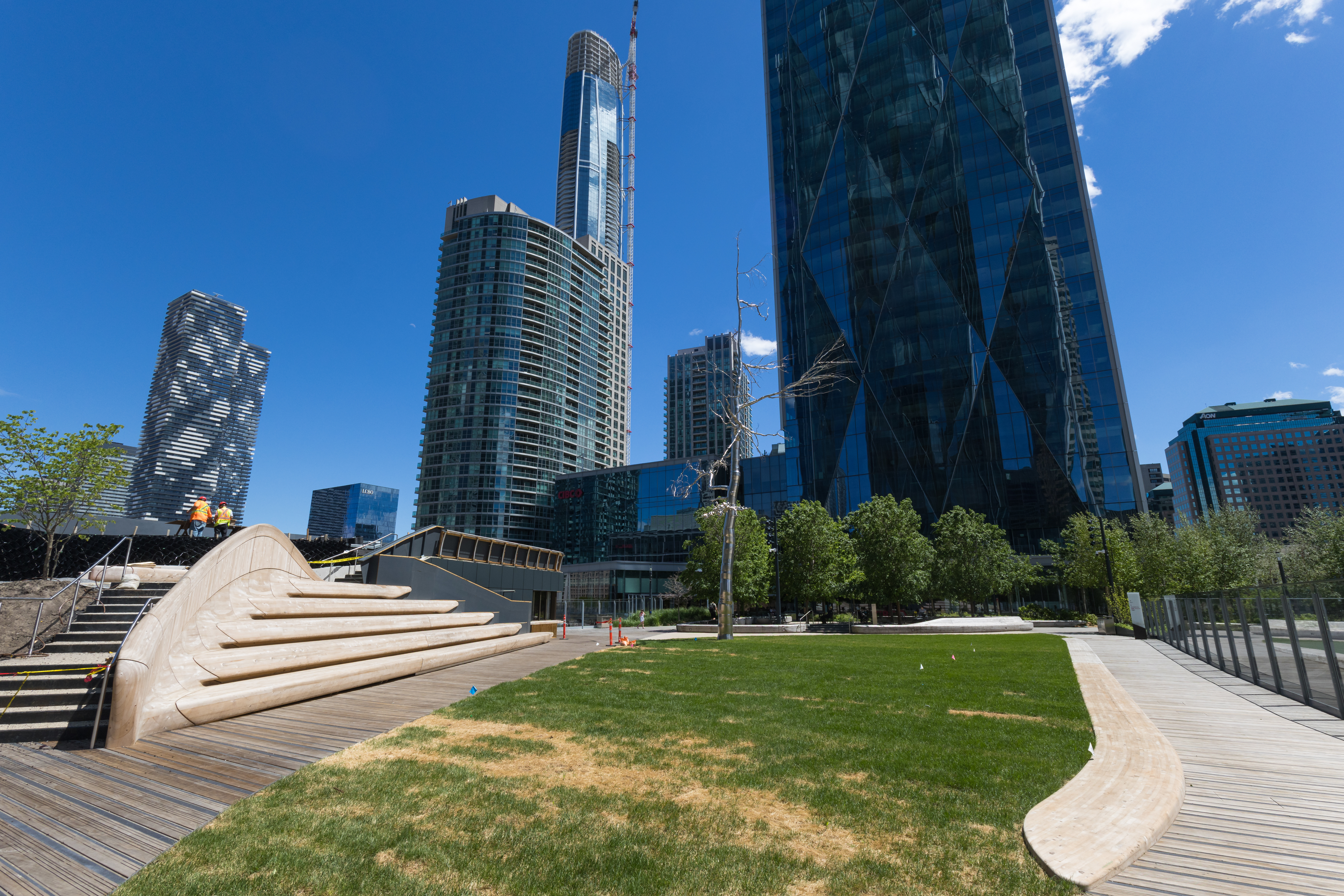
Elevated Park

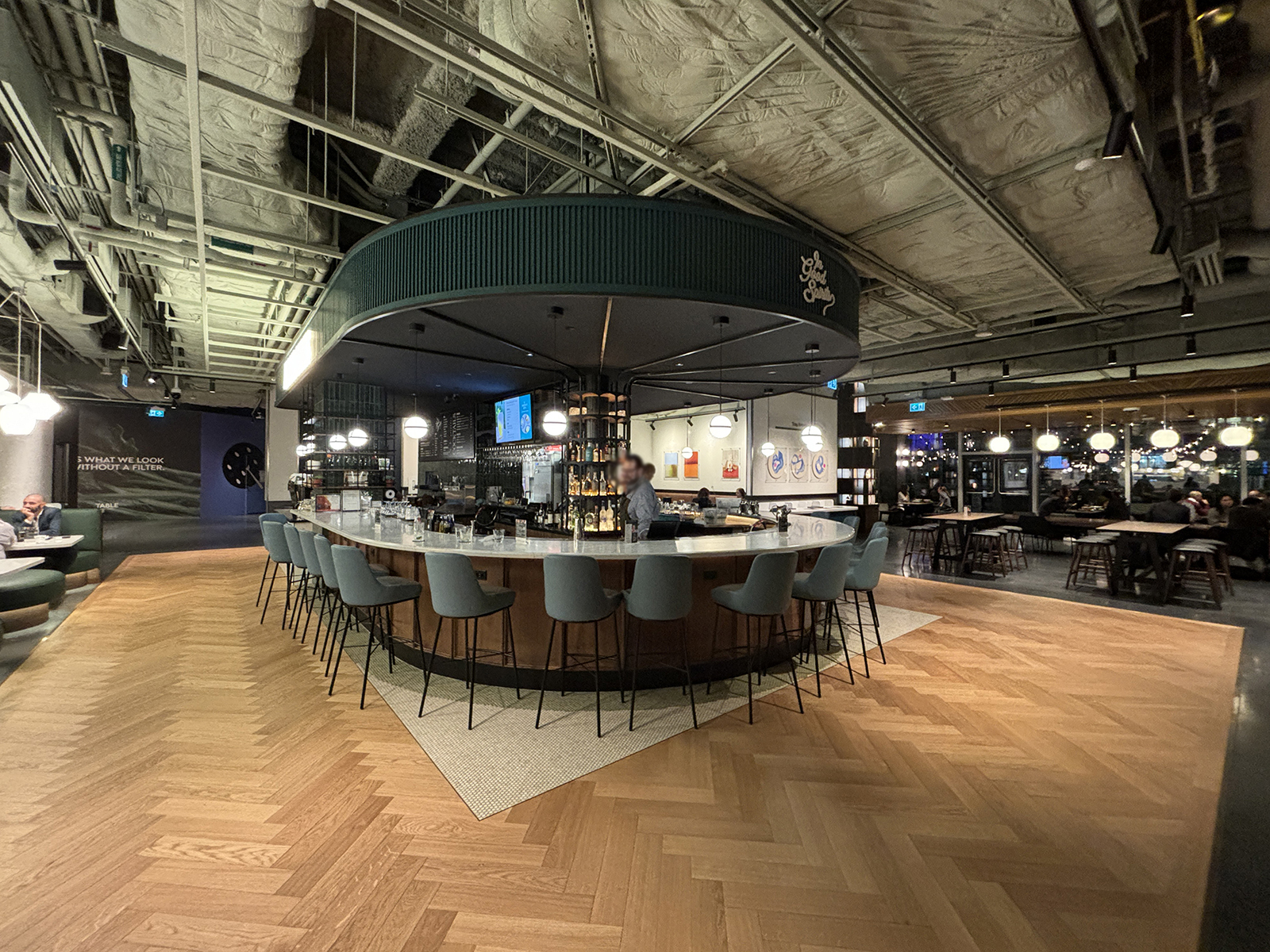
TABLE Fare + Social Food Hall at Level 4

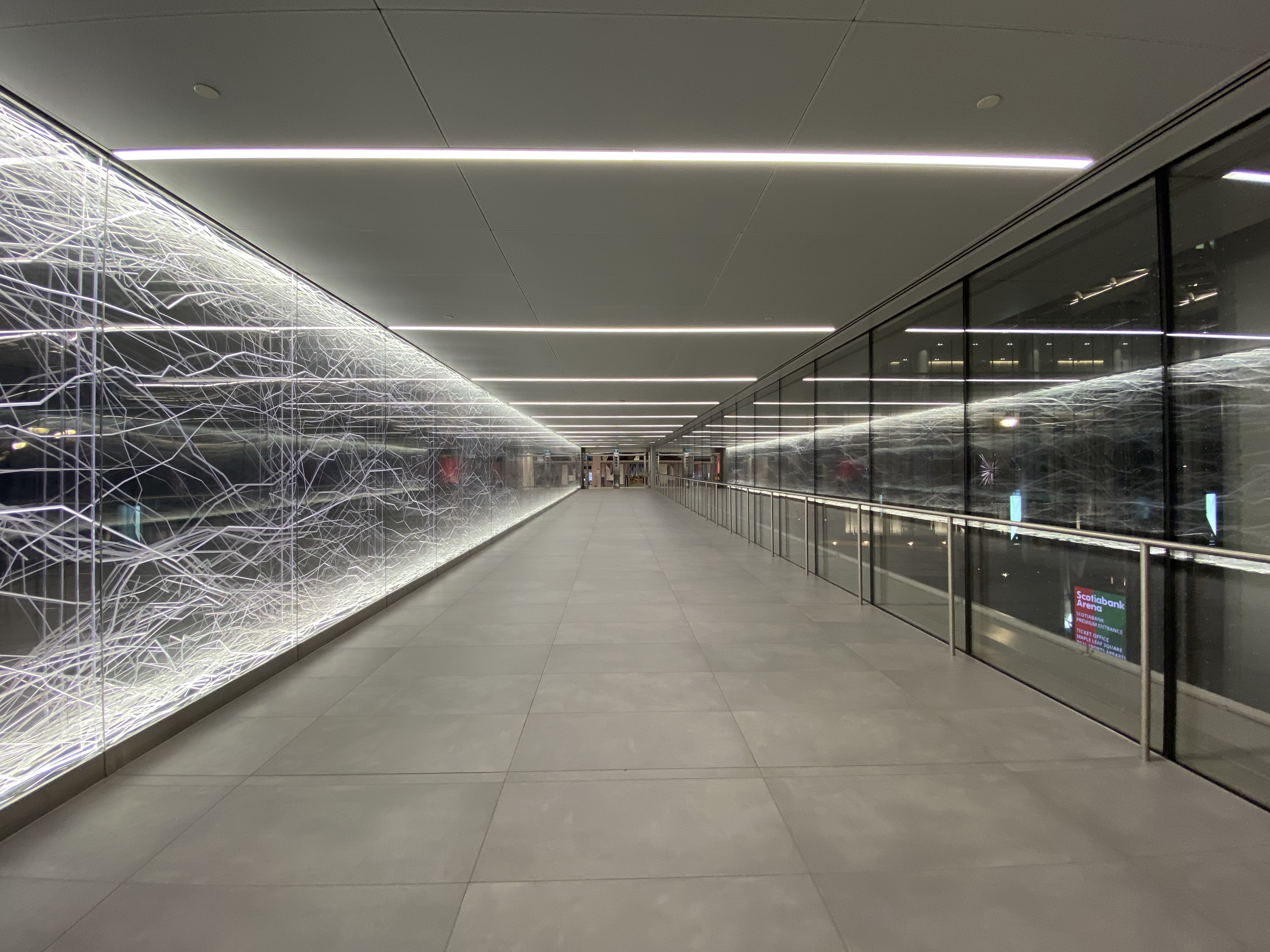
South Tower bridge access artwork by Nicolas Baier

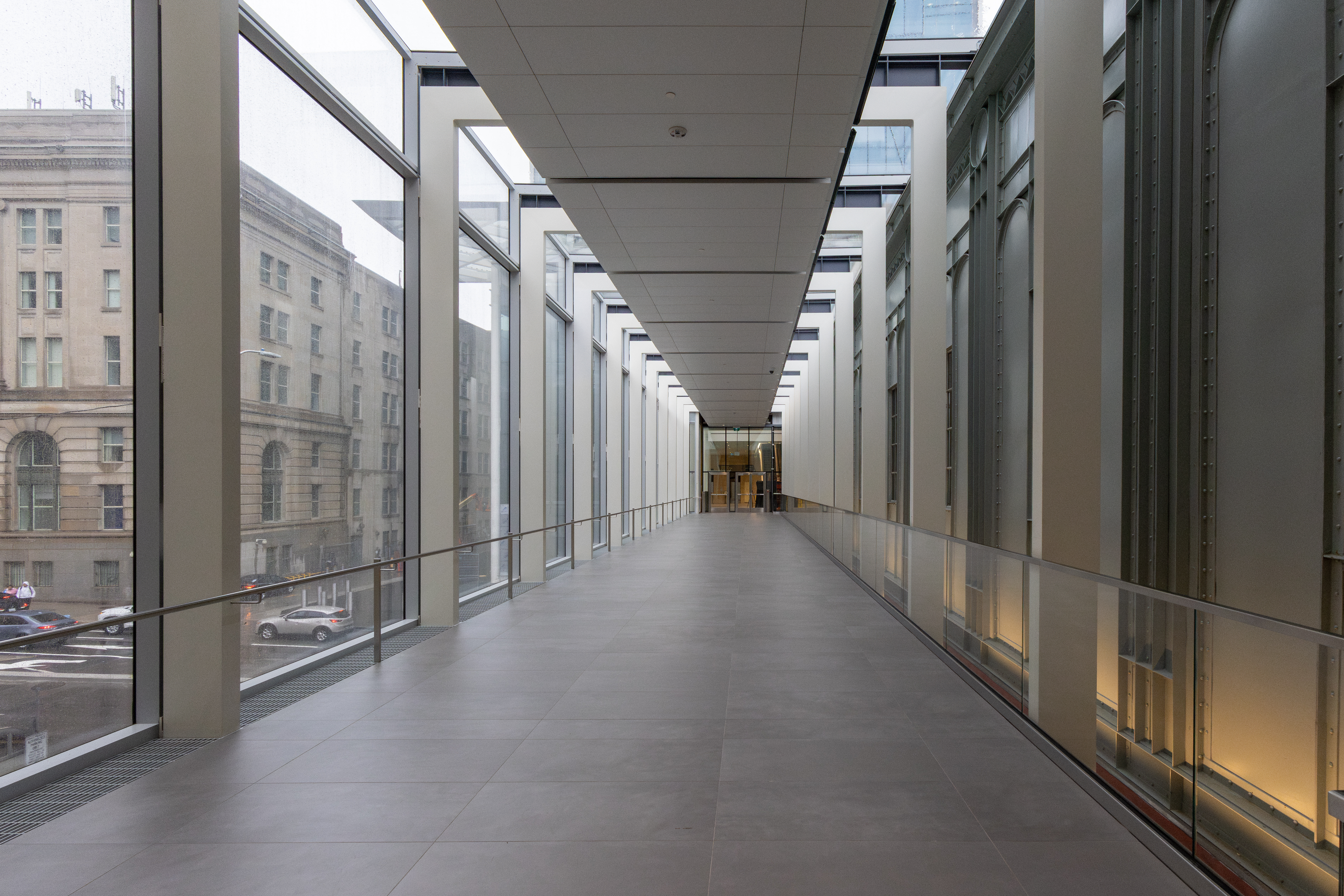
North Tower pedestrian bridge

== History ==
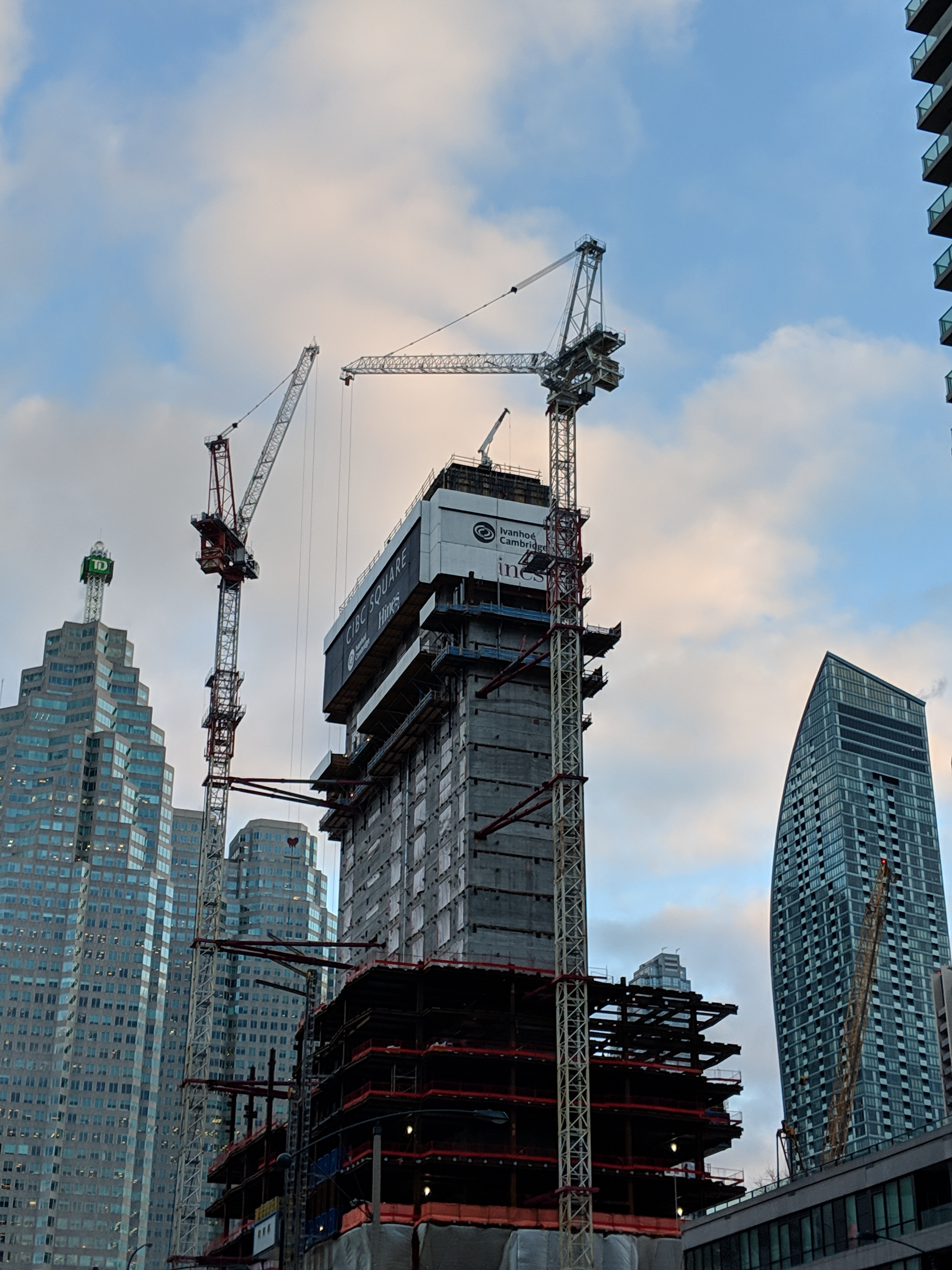
South tower (81 Bay Street) under construction in March 2019

The development is being co-led by Ivanhoé Cambridge and Hines using land acquired from Metrolinx (as well as city-owned Toronto Parking Authority parking lot), and designed by British architectural firm WilkinsonEyre and Adamson Associates of Toronto. Ivanhoe Cambridge bought 81 Bay Street (formerly 45 Bay Street) in 2007 and later acquired additional land and air rights over the rail corridor. In September 2014, Ivanhoe agreed with Metrolinx to build the new GO Bus Terminal at 81 Bay Street.

CIBC was announced as the anchor tenant of the south tower (81 Bay Street) in April 2017, with construction beginning in June 2017. The south tower was scheduled to open in 2020 but was delayed until summer 2021. The Union Station Bus Terminal opened in December 2020.

Construction on the north tower began in March 2021. The north tower was topped out in January 2025.

== Key tenants ==
81 BAY STREET

- CIBC is the anchor tenant of the complex.
- Microsoft Canada has moved into the facility for its Canadian headquarters at 81 Bay Street from 1950 Meadowvale Boulevard in Mississauga.
- Boston Consulting Group has its Canadian headquarters in CIBC SQUARE.
- AGF Management is also leasing office spaces at 81 Bay Street.
- TABLE Fare + Social occupies a portion of the fourth floor level.
- The Union Station Bus Terminal is located at 81 Bay Street. It replaced a previous bus terminal located on the site where the north tower is being built (141 Bay Street).

141 BAY STREET

- CIBC is also the future anchor tenant at 141 Bay Street.
- The tower will also include a four-storey retail space.

== See also ==
- List of tallest buildings in Toronto
