= Commerce Court =

Office building complex in Toronto, Ontario

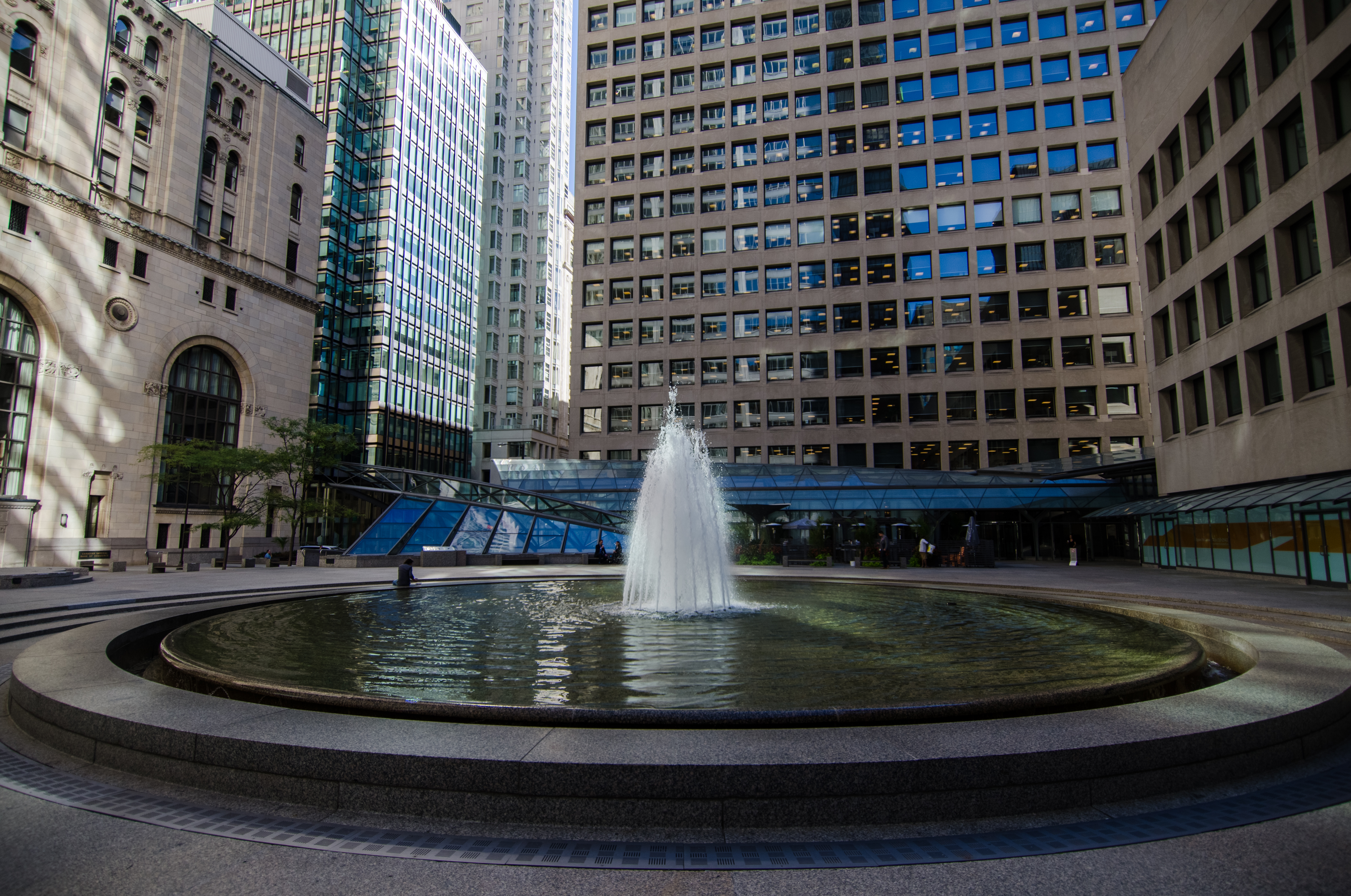
- Commerce Court's central plaza, surrounded by Commerce Court North (left), Commerce Court East (centre), and Commerce Court South (right)
- Alternative names: CIBC Buildings; Commerce Court-North, -South, -East, -West

General information
- Type: Commercial offices
- Location: Toronto, Ontario, Canada
- Coordinates: 43.6481°N 79.3788°W
- Completed: North tower: 1931; Complex: 1972
- Owner: British Columbia Investment Management Corporation
- Operator: QuadReal Property Group

Height
- Antenna spire: 48 foot mast antenna on Commerce Court West
- Roof: West tower: 239 m (784 ft); North tower: 145 m (476 ft)
- Top floor: 57 (West Tower)

Technical details
- Floor count: West tower: 57; North tower: 34; East tower: 14; South tower: 5
- Lifts/elevators: West tower: 31; North tower: 10; East tower: 8

Design and construction
- Architects: York & Sawyer; Page + Steele Architects; I.M. Pei & Partners
- Developer: CIBC

Ontario Heritage Act
- Official name: 25 KING ST W
- Designated: 1991

Commerce Court is an office building complex on King and Bay Streets in the financial district of Toronto, Ontario, Canada. The four-building complex is a mix of Art Deco, International, and early Modernism architectural styles. The office complex served as the corporate headquarters for the Canadian Imperial Bank of Commerce (CIBC) and its predecessor, the Canadian Bank of Commerce, from 1931 to 2021. Although CIBC relocated its headquarters to CIBC Square, the bank still maintains offices at Commerce Court.

== History ==
The site initially housed Toronto's first Wesleyan Methodist Church, a small wooden chapel surrounded by woods (which later became the Metropolitan United Church) from 1818 to 1831, then as Theatre Royal from 1833 onwards. From 1887 to 1927 it was home to a seven-storey head office of the Canadian Bank of Commerce, which was then demolished to make way for a new corporate headquarters, the building now called Commerce Court North. The new 34-storey limestone building was the tallest in the British Empire/Commonwealth for roughly three decades, until 1962.

In 1961 the bank merged with the Imperial Bank to form the Canadian Imperial Bank of Commerce (CIBC) and construction soon began to establish Commerce Court as its headquarters complex of buildings. The tallest, and the tallest in Toronto at the time, was Commerce Court West, completed in 1972.

On Wednesday, January 9, 2008, a portion of a CIBC sign at the top of the Commerce Court West building blew off as a result of wind gusts. Police cordoned off the area as a precaution. As a result, Bay St. from Front to Richmond and King St. from York to Yonge were shut down. Toronto Transit Commission (TTC) service was diverted. This took place eight months after a piece of white marble panel fell from the 60th storey of the First Canadian Place building, and ten months after layers of ice fell from the CN Tower.

The CIBC sold the complex in April 2000, now managed by QuadReal Property Group, but the head office of the bank remains the anchor tenant. CIBC relocated its headquarters from Commerce Court to CIBC Square on 1 November 2021. However, the bank intends to maintain a presence at Commerce Court.

== Site ==
Commerce Court is a commercial complex made up of four structures, and a central courtyard. The complex is bounded by several major roadways, including Bay Street to the west, King Street West to the north, Yonge Street along its southeastern periphery, and Wellington Street West to the south. The structures are connected to the PATH network, a series of underground pedestrian tunnels that connect downtown Toronto.

=== Towers ===
==== Commerce Court North ====
The first building, now known as Commerce Court North, was opened in 1931 as the headquarters of the Canadian Bank of Commerce, a precursor bank to the current main tenant. The Canadian Bank of Commerce head office (now Commerce Court North) was designed by the American bank specialists York and Sawyer with the notable Canadian firm Darling and Pearson as the local architects of record. Structural engineering was provided by Harkness and Hertzberg; the vault was designed by Frederick S. Holmes and built by J&J Taylor. At the time of its construction, the building was one of the most opulent corporate headquarters in Canada and featured a public observation deck (since closed to the public for safety and liability concerns). The building is protected under Part IV of the Ontario Heritage Act since 1991.

The Art Deco-style building is made of limestone and features a one-ton chandelier with over 70 lights in the lobby. Along the roofline (32 stories up), are 4 bearded figures along each side of the building. Each head is 24 feet high, representing Courage, Observation, Foresight and Enterprise.

==== Later buildings ====
In 1972, three other buildings were erected, thus creating the Commerce Court complex: glass and stainless steel glass curtain wall International Style Commerce Court West designed by Pei Cobb Freed & Partners with Page and Steele.

Commerce Court West was the tallest building among the three later additions, at 57 storeys and 287 metres (942 ft) it was the tallest building in Canada from 1972 to 1976. Originally, Commerce Court West's 57th floor was an observation floor.

Commerce Court East (1972: 13 storeys) and Commerce Court South (5 storeys) are glass and applied masonry structures also designed by Pei Cobb Freed & Partners with Page and Steele in 1972. In 1994, Zeidler Partnership Architects was commissioned to renovate the Commerce Court urban plaza, the banking area at the base of Commerce Court West, and the below-grade retail area. There are 65 retail shops in the plaza below the complex.

==== Technical details ====
Building	Image	Year completed	Height	Floors	Address	Architects	Ref.
Commerce Court East		1972	56 metres (184 ft)	14	18 Wellington Street West	Pei Cobb Freed & Partners with Page and Steele	
Commerce Court North		1931	145 metres (476 ft)	34	25 King Street West	York and Sawyer	
Commerce Court South			22 metres (72 ft)	5	30 Wellington Street West	Pei Cobb Freed & Partners with Page and Steele	
Commerce Court West		1972	287 metres (942 ft)	57	199 Bay Street	Pei Cobb Freed & Partners with Page and Steele	

=== Central plaza ===
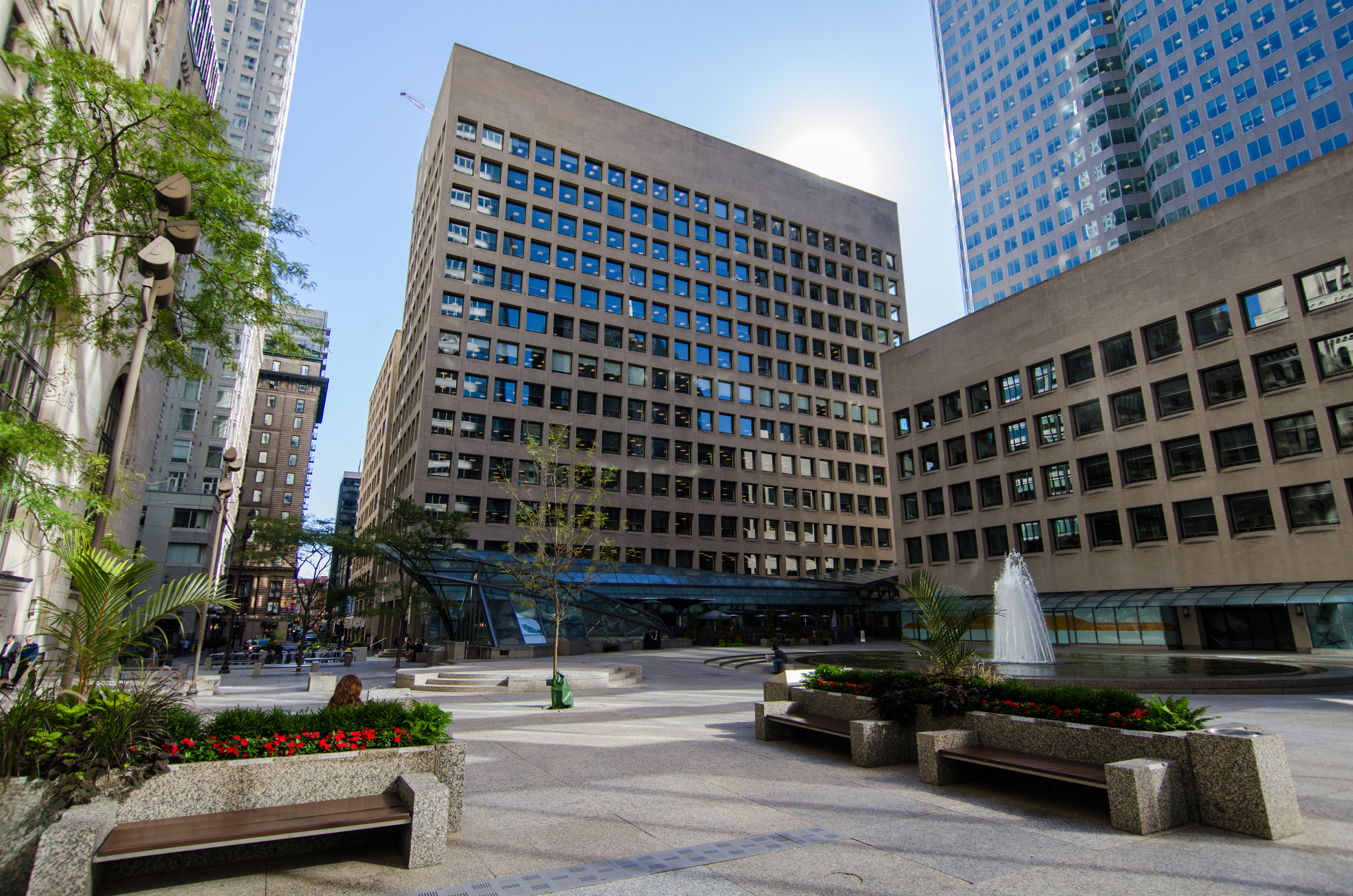
The complex features an outdoor central plaza with a fountain. Commerce Court East (centre) and Commerce Court South (right) are visible in the background.

Surrounding the Commerce Court complex of buildings is a plaza featuring a fountain in its centre, and a three-piece bronze sculpture by Derrick Stephan Hudson entitled, Tembo, Mother of Elephants completed in 2002. The sculptures were installed on site in 2005 on loan from the L.L. Odette Foundation of Windsor, Ontario.

In popular culture, the plaza was used as a stand-in for Wall Street in a pair of Kids in the Hall sketches featuring Mr. Tyzik, the Headcrusher.

== Tenants ==
The Canadian Imperial Bank of Commerce is a major tenant for the complex, with the bank having formerly housed its headquarters there. However, CIBC announced plans to relocate its headquarters from Commerce Court to CIBC Square in 2021. However, the bank still maintains offices at the office complex.

Other anchor tenants situated in Commerce Court includes B2B Bank, Blake, Cassels & Graydon LLP, Deutsche Bank, Guardian Capital Group, and Stikeman Elliott LLP. Other notable tenants of the building include the Canadian Bankers Association, Ricoh, and CIBC Wood Gundy, the latter tenant also being a subsidiary of CIBC.

== See also ==
- Architecture of Toronto
- List of tallest buildings in Canada
- List of tallest buildings in Toronto
