= List of tallest buildings in the Waterloo Region =

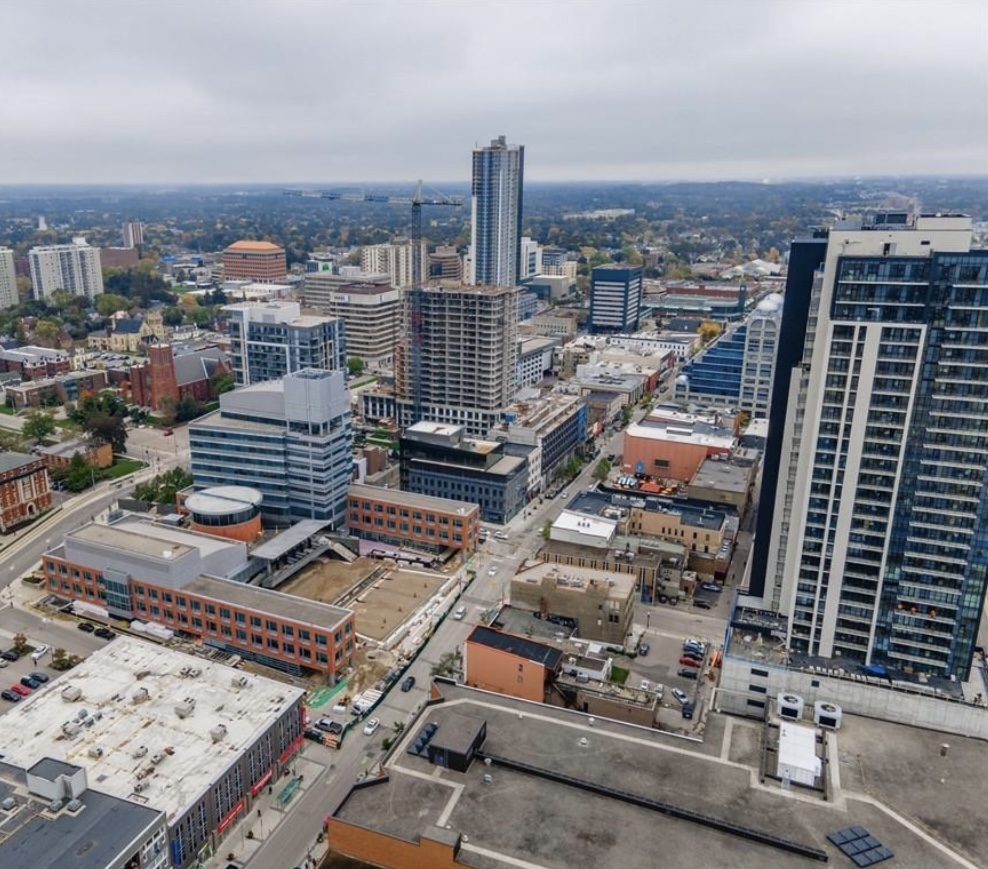
Downtown Kitchener, 2021

The Regional Municipality of Waterloo is the 10th-largest urban area in Canada and among the fastest-growing in the country. It comprises the cities of Kitchener, Waterloo and Cambridge which, collectively, grew by over 100,000 people between July 1, 2019 and July 1, 2024. The region is among the largest in Southern Ontario, only being surpassed by Hamilton, Mississauga, Brampton, Ottawa and Toronto. The region is also home to 4 rural townships that are home to numerous towns and villages, such as Elmira and New Hamburg. The three cities have a combined population of 627,729 as of July 1, 2024, while the cities and surrounding townships area has a population approaching 700,000.

In the Waterloo Region, as of June 2020, there are 61 high-rises over 50 metres (160 ft) and 110 high-rise buildings that exceed 35 metres (115 ft) in height. The tallest buildings built and proposed within the region are in Kitchener's downtown core which will be home to the region's first skyscrapers at least 150 metres (490 ft) tall. The tallest building completed in the region is in Kitchener with the 130.7-metre (429 ft) DTK Condos at the corner of Duke and Frederick St, this can be seen in the center of the image to the right. The majority of the high-rises in the area are in Kitchener, however Waterloo has a significant amount in the Northdale area.

The tallest building under construction in the Waterloo Region is TEK Tower located in Kitchener, at 146 metres (479 ft) and 45 floors in height. It structurally topped out in the summer of 2025. As of July 2023, there are at least 184 high-rises under, approved for, and proposed for construction in the Waterloo Regional Municipality, of which 91 are within Kitchener. The tallest approved building within the region is the 50-floor, 185-metre (607 ft) Station Park E building which will complete the five-tower Station Park development. If approved and constructed, the currently proposed 50 Borden Ave S will overtake Station Park E to become the tallest building in the region standing at 57 floors and 187.8 metres (616 ft) over downtown Kitchener.

The vast majority of the development occurring within the region is along the LRT line which was completed and opened in June 2019. Since then the area along the LRT has seen growth.

== Urban fabric ==
Each city in the region, as well as the townships have the power to determine the zoning and thus the built form of the city and towns. This greatly influences the amount of development and the type that can occur, in the coming sections this will become more prevalent.

=== Kitchener ===
The city of Kitchener recently updated the zoning within the downtown core as well as all areas along the LRT. This includes every major transit station area (MTSA) for the ION as well as the future Sportsworld MTSA which is part of phase 2 of the ION. This process to update the zoning was called Growing Together, through the process all existing zoning within the MTSAs, which included zoning dating back to 1985 was removed and replaced with 4 new zones. These zones are called strategic growth areas (SGA), these SGAs are split into SGA-1, SGA-2, SGA-3 and SGA-4. Each zone covers approximately 25% of the MTSAs within the city. The most restrictive zone is SGA-1 which allows for a maximum height of 4 floors and a minimum floor space ratio (FSR) of 1. The SGA-2 zone allows for a maximum height of 8 floors and a minimum FSR of 1, this zone is generally seen as the transition zone between the SGA-1 and higher density SGA-3 and SGA-4 zones. The SGA-3 zone allows for a maximum height of 28 floors with the same density restriction as SGA-1 and SGA-2. Lastly the SGA-4 zone allows for unlimited height. Within each of these zones there is no parking required regardless of how many units are in place. The city has provided minimum amenity space requirements for all of these zones, likewise the city has developed a concept called priority streets in these zones where a certain amount of the road frontage must be community facing on the first two floors of the building, this could be a school, community centre or commercial space among other uses. Through the Growing Together project the city of Kitchener won numerous awards, for example it won a Smart50 Award in 2023 where it was announced as one of the top-3 projects overall.

The areas outside of the MTSAs still have relatively restrictive zoning with single family housing being the primary built form, however there are various nodes and corridors in the city that are experiencing densification. Much of this is occurring in far reaching areas of the city (new subdivisions). This will be changing in the coming years however as the city is looking to expand the existing SGA zones to larger areas of the city as part of the Kitchener 2051 Official Plan update. This will make corridors in the city such as Ottawa Street, as well as Nodes such as Highland/Fischer Hallman and Strasburg and Block Line have the same SGA zoning as the MTSAs.

=== Waterloo ===
The City of Waterloo has updated their zoning bylaw recently along the LRT much like Kitchener. However, this was restricted to areas north of Columbia St. These areas have a new zone called station area mixed use (SAMU). The SAMU zone has the largest heights in the city and likewise the highest densities. The SAMU zone allows for a maximum height of 30 floors/105 meters. In the rest of the city there are various other zones but much like Kitchener the heights are concentrated along the LRT line. The one notable exception to this is in the Northdale area as the area is home to the primary student residences for both the University of Waterloo and Laurier. This area is also home to some significant height.

The Northdale area is home to the RN zones of Waterloo, in these zones the maximum building height corresponds to the zone, RN-6, RN-12 and RN-25 each is representative of the maximum number of floors allowed and likewise has some of the taller buildings in Waterloo. Along major corridors such as Weber and King there is existing height and the zoning is generally permissive of the height through the C1, RMU and C5 zones which all allow for varying heights and densities, namely each one of these zones have maximum heights similar to the RN zones however these correspond to the building height in meters instead of floors. For example C1-20, C1-30, C1-40, C1-60, and C1-81.

=== Cambridge ===
Cambridge has the most antiquated zoning within the region, however they are currently going through a process to update their bylaw. The update will allow for residential zones throughout Cambridge to have a maximum height of 15 floors, still well below KWs height limits. Within the downtowns (Galt, Hespeler and Preston) there will be densification possible but not on the magnitudes occurring in Kitchener and Waterloo. The core areas of Preston and Hespeler will allow for a maximum of 5 floors. Meanwhile Galt will allow for similar heights to what is presently allowed (0-34m). Cambridge however doesn't have the LRT yet so the bylaw will likely be updated in coming years once construction has started.

== Tallest buildings ==
This list ranks completed buildings in Kitchener, Waterloo, and Cambridge that stand at least 75 m (246 ft) tall as of 2026, based on standard height measurement. This includes spires and architectural details but does not include antenna masts. The “Year” column indicates the year of completion. Buildings tied in height are sorted by year of completion with earlier buildings ranked first, and then alphabetically.

Was the tallest building in the Waterloo Region upon completion

Rank	Name	Image	City	Height m (ft)	Floors	Year	Purpose	Notes
1	DTK Condos		Kitchener; 43°27′02″N 80°29′14″W	130.7 (429)	39	2022	Residential	Tallest building in Kitchener and the Waterloo Regional Municipality since 2022. Tallest building completed in Kitchener in the 2020s.
2	Charlie West		Kitchener; 43°27′02″N 80°29′36″W	106.3 (349)	31	2021	Residential	Tallest building in Kitchener and the Waterloo Region briefly from 2021 to 2022.
3	SYLK Towers	—	Kitchener; 43°25′32″N 80°25′28″W	96.9 (318)	24	2025	Residential	
4	Garment Street Condos	—	Kitchener; 43°27′00″N 80°30′07″W	92.4 (303)	27	2022	Residential	
5	Union Towers II at Station Park	—	Kitchener; 43°27′13″N 80°30′12″W	92.4 (303)	28	2023	Residential	
6	203 Albert	—	Waterloo; 43°28′24″N 80°31′54″W	88.4 (290)	24	2022	Residential	Tallest building in Waterloo.
7	The Onyx North at The Barrel Yards	—	Waterloo; 43°27′53″N 80°31′51″W	85.7 (281)	25	2015	Residential	Tallest building in Waterloo from 2015 to 2017 and the Waterloo Region from 2015 to 2021.
8	The Onyx South at The Barrel Yards	—	Waterloo; 43°27′52″N 80°31′50″W	85.7 (281)	25	2017	Residential	
9	Sage II	—	Waterloo; 43°28′44″N 80°31′35″W	83.5 (274)	23	2015	Residential	
10	Young Condos	—	Kitchener; 43°27′04″N 80°29′28″W	83.2 (273)	25	2023	Residential	
11	Caroline Street Private Residences	—	Waterloo; 43°27′32″N 80°31′10″W	81.7 (268)	22	2019	Residential	
12	330 Phillip North Tower	—	Waterloo; 43°28′35″N 80°32′21″W	79.6 (261)	25	2016	Residential	Also known as ICON 330 North Tower.
13	330 Phillip South Tower	—	Waterloo; 43°28′33″N 80°32′19″W	79.6 (261)	25	2016	Residential	Also known as ICON 330 South Tower.
14	308 King	—	Waterloo; 43°28′43″N 80°31′30″W	78.6 (258)	25	2024	Residential	Also known as 308 King North.
15	Sun Life Building		Waterloo; 43°27′28″N 80°31′02″W	78 (256)	18	1987	Office	Also known as the Clarica Building. Tallest office building in the Waterloo Region. Tallest building in the Waterloo Region from 1987 to 2015.
16	One Hundred Tower Two	—	Kitchener; 43°27′02″N 80°30′06″W	76.2 (250)	21	2022	Residential	
17	The Cooperage North at The Barrel Yards	—	Waterloo; 43°27′53″N 80°31′47″W	75.6 (248)	22	2014	Residential	
18	The Cooperage South at The Barrel Yards	—	Waterloo; 43°27′52″N 80°31′44″W	75.6 (248)	22	2017	Residential	
19	Gaslight District Condominiums II	—	Cambridge; 43°21′20″N 80°19′09″W	75.6 (248)	20	2023	Residential	Tallest building in Cambridge.

== Tallest under construction or proposed ==
=== Under construction ===
The following table includes buildings under construction in the Waterloo Region that are planned to be at least 75 metres (246 ft) tall as of 2026, based on standard height measurement. The "Year" column indicates the expected year of completion. For buildings whose heights are unavailable, a cutoff of 25 floors is used.

Name	City	Height m (ft)	Floors	Year	Purpose	Notes
TEK Tower Kitchener	Kitchener	147.5 (484)	45	2026	Residential	Will become the tallest building in Kitchener when completed.
864 King West A	Kitchener	140.5 (461)	44	2028	Residential	
The Metz H	Kitchener	127.8 (419)	38	2028	Residential	
900 King St. W	Kitchener	79.7 (261)	25	2026	Residential	
Duo at Station Park	Kitchener	–	36	2026	Residential	
Eureka	Kitchener	–	32	2028	Residential	
The Metz G	Kitchener	–	25	2028	Residential	
20 University Ave E	Waterloo	–	25	–	Residential	

== See also ==
- Canadian architecture
- List of tallest buildings in Canada
- List of tallest buildings in Ontario
- List of tallest buildings in Hamilton, Ontario
- List of tallest buildings in London, Ontario
- List of tallest buildings in Toronto
