= Pinnacle One Yonge =

Skyscraper complex in Toronto, Ontario

SkyTower at Pinnacle One Yonge
- SkyTower (centre) nearing completion in September 2026

Record height
- Tallest in Canada since 2026^{[I]}
- Preceded by: One Bloor West

General information
- Status: Topped-out
- Type: Mixed-use development
- Location: 7 Yonge Street; Toronto, Ontario, Canada
- Coordinates: 43°38′36″N 79°22′30″W
- Construction started: 2018
- Estimated completion: September 2026

Height
- Height: 351.4 m (1,153 ft)

Technical details
- Floor count: 106

Design and construction
- Architect: Hariri Pontarini Architects
- Developer: Pinnacle International
- Structural engineer: Jablonsky, Ast and Partners

Prestige at Pinnacle One Yonge
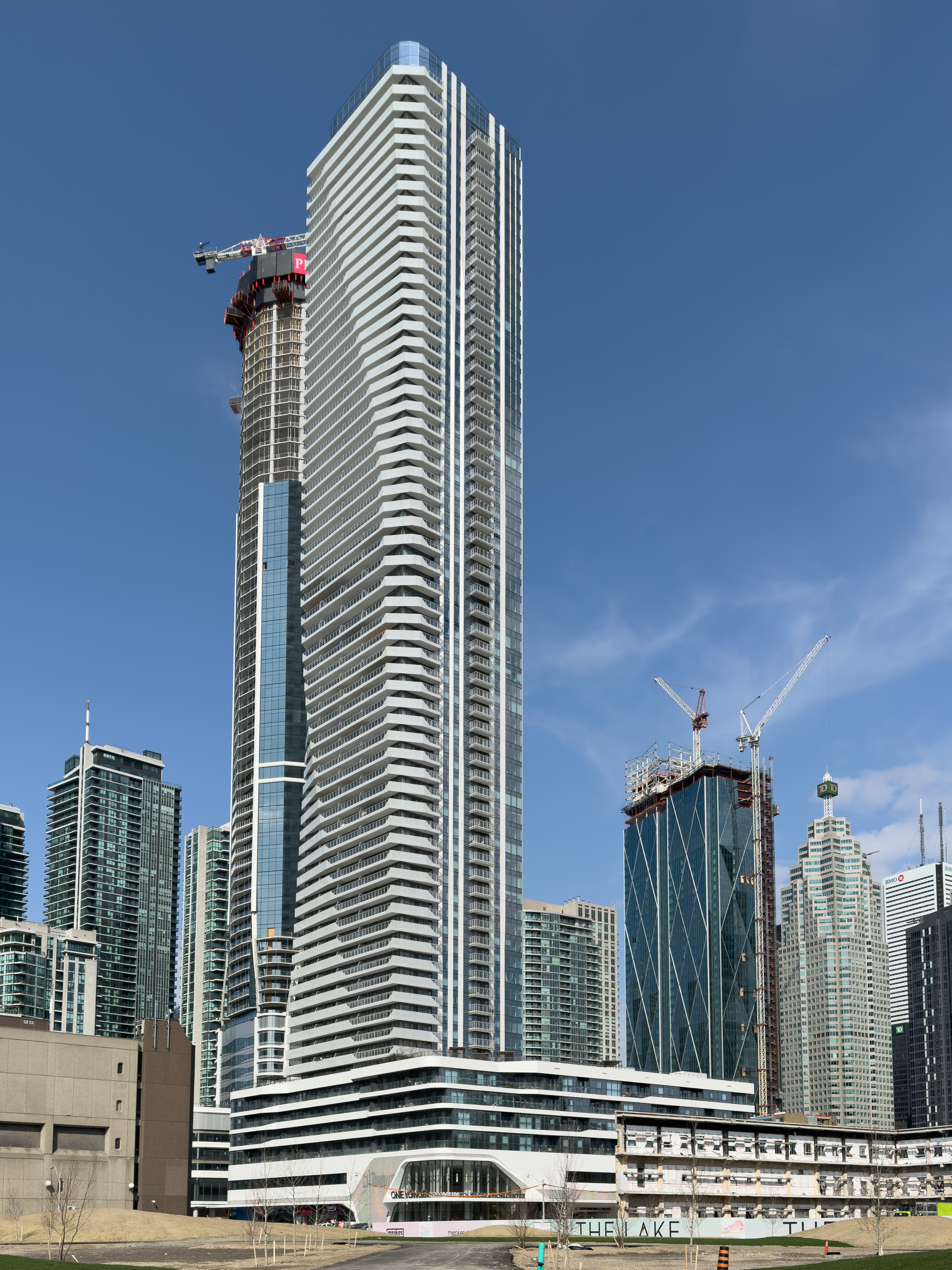
- Prestige in April 2025

General information
- Status: Completed
- Location: 28 Freeland Street; Toronto, Ontario, Canada
- Coordinates: 43°38′37″N 79°22′27″W
- Construction started: 2018
- Completed: 2022

Height
- Height: 216.2 m (709 ft)

Technical details
- Floor count: 65

Design and construction
- Developer: Pinnacle International

Pinnacle One Yonge is a mixed-use development currently under construction in Toronto, Ontario, Canada. It will consist of six skyscrapers ranging in height from 22 to 106 storeys tall. The first tower – Prestige at 65 storeys – was completed in 2022. The second building, known as the SkyTower, is Canada's tallest residential building. The complex is intended to include 4,600 square metres (50,000 ft^{2}) of community space, 7,400 square metres (80,000 ft^{2}) for stores, and 93,000 square metres (1,000,000 ft^{2}) for offices, in addition to 2,500 apartments.

== Construction ==
Construction on the first phase of Pinnacle One Yonge started in 2018 and took four years. The plans, designed by Hariri Pontarini Architects, initially called for three towers, including a 95-storey structure measuring 313 metres (1,027 ft) tall. The plans also included a 65-storey structure, the Prestige, and an 80-storey structure to the north; the three structures were to include 2,200 apartments, along with retail, office space, a community centre, a hotel, and a park. The plans were released in early 2020, at which point the Prestige was under construction.

In November 2022, the developer (Pinnacle International) submitted an application to the City of Toronto to increase the height of the two tallest towers. The proposal was to add 11 storeys to the SkyTower, an increase from 95 to 106 storeys, increasing its height from 313 metres (1,027 ft) to 353 metres (1,158 ft) and making it the tallest building in Toronto, as well as potentially the tallest residential building in the world by floor count according to the CTBUH. The 80-storey third tower would see 12 storeys added, becoming 92 storeys tall. The total height would be increased from 264 metres (866 ft) to 307.7 metres (1,010 ft). In November 2023, the city's Planning Department recommended the increases for approval by City Council.

In March 2025, a proposal to increase the SkyTower's height to 356 metres (1,168 ft) and 106 floors was submitted. The SkyTower surpassed its 100th storey in December 2025 and reached its top floor in March 2026.

== Gallery ==
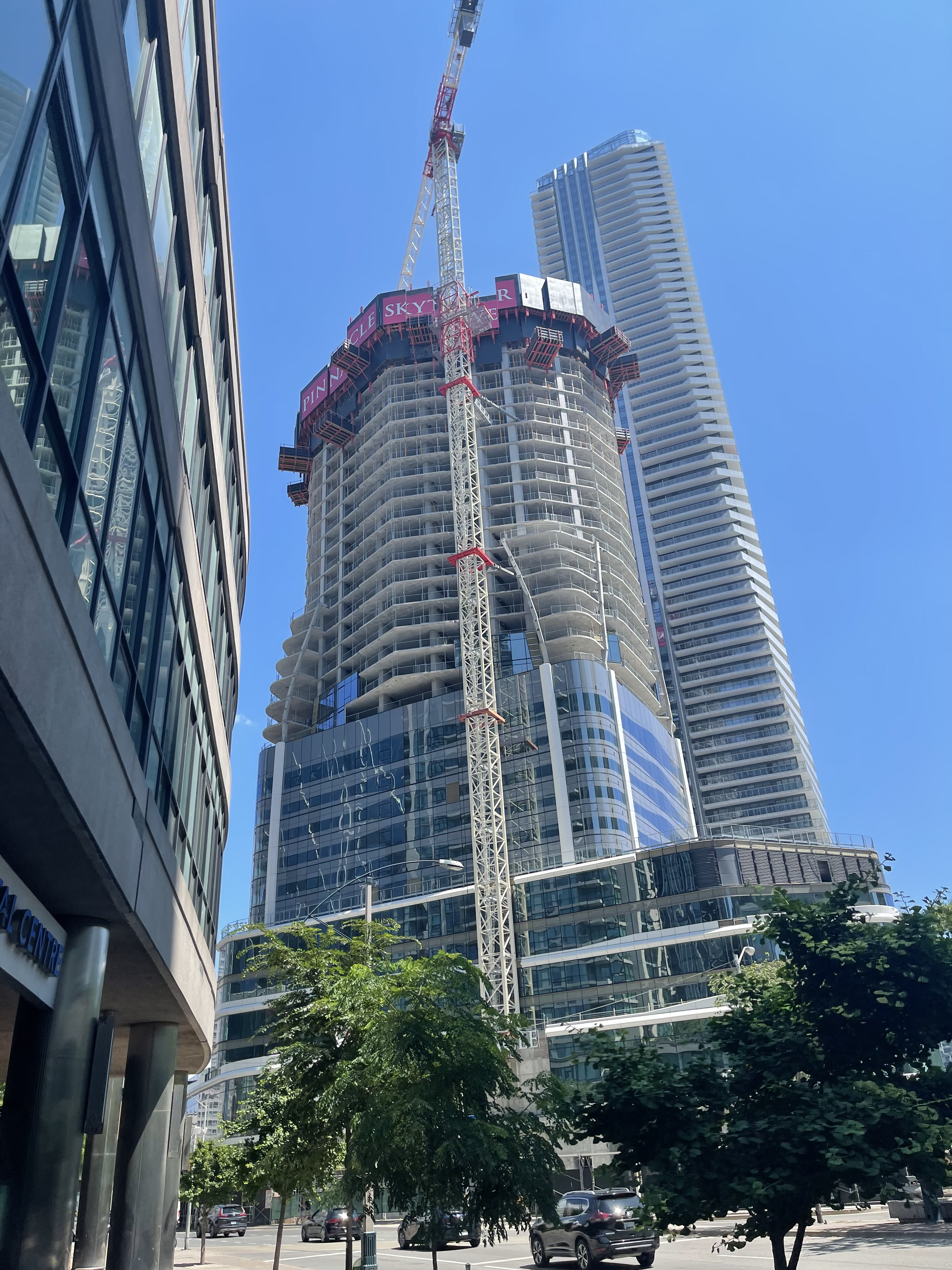
SkyTower under construction in July 2024

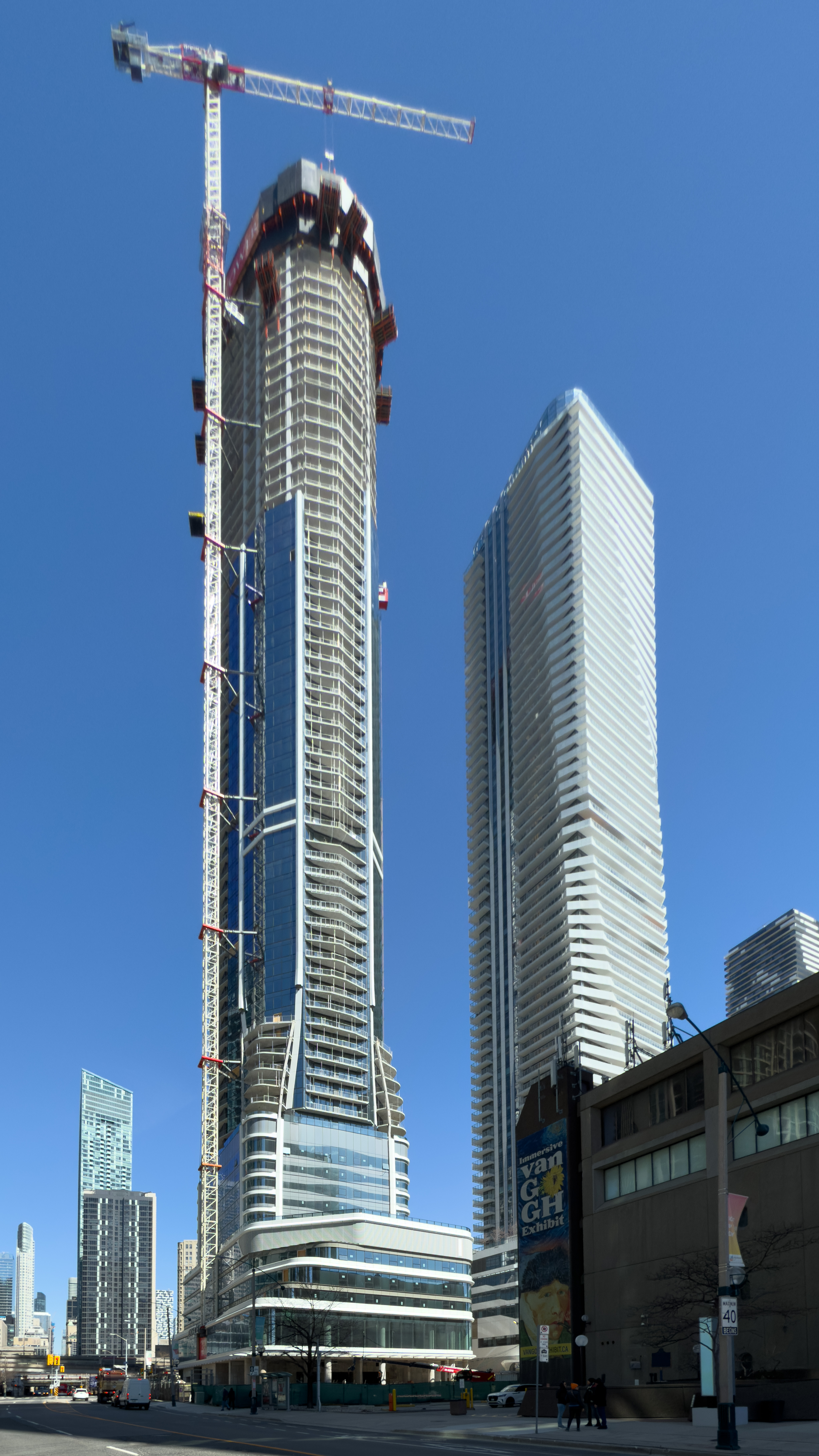
SkyTower under construction in April 2025

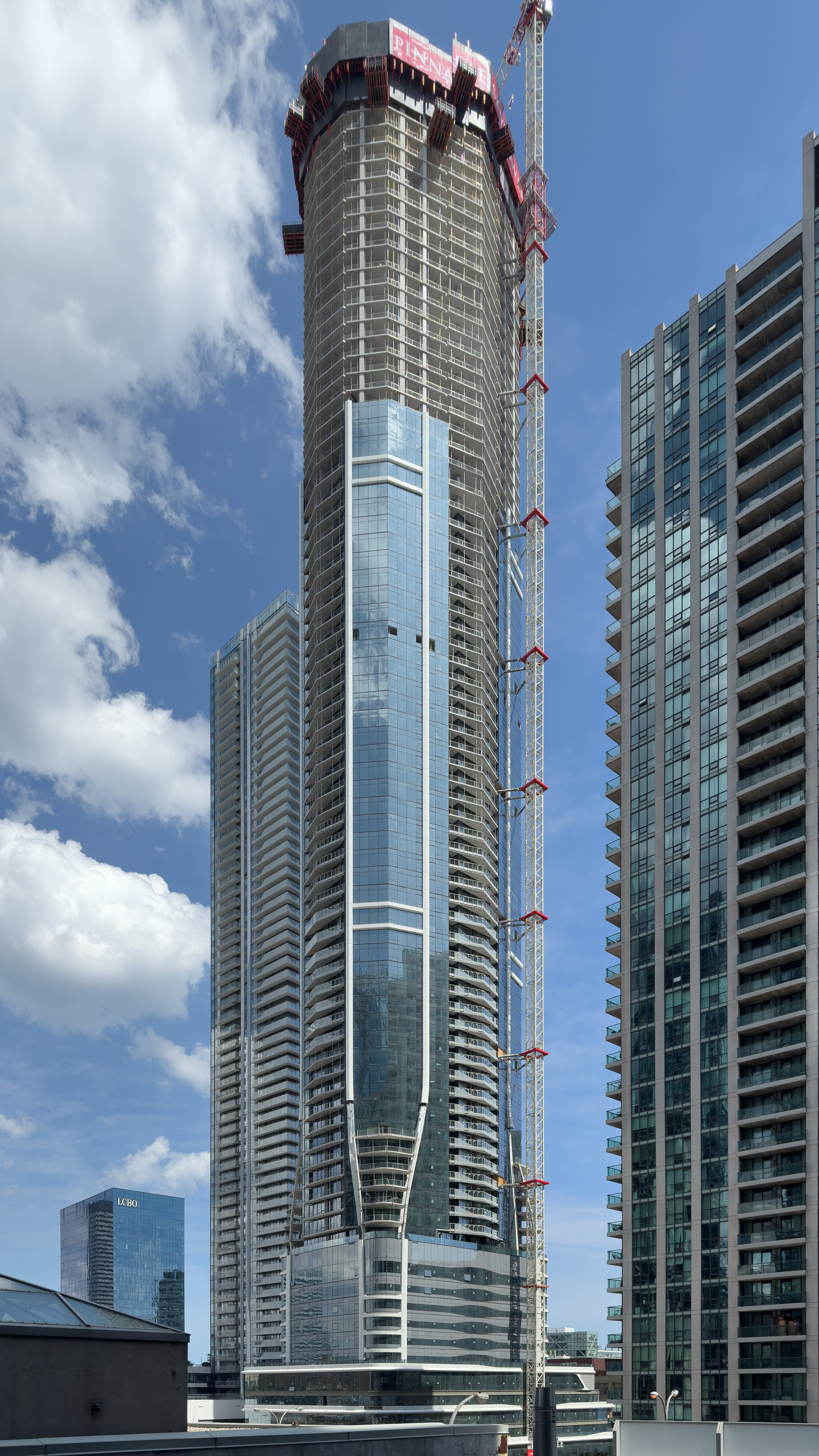
SkyTower under construction in June 2025

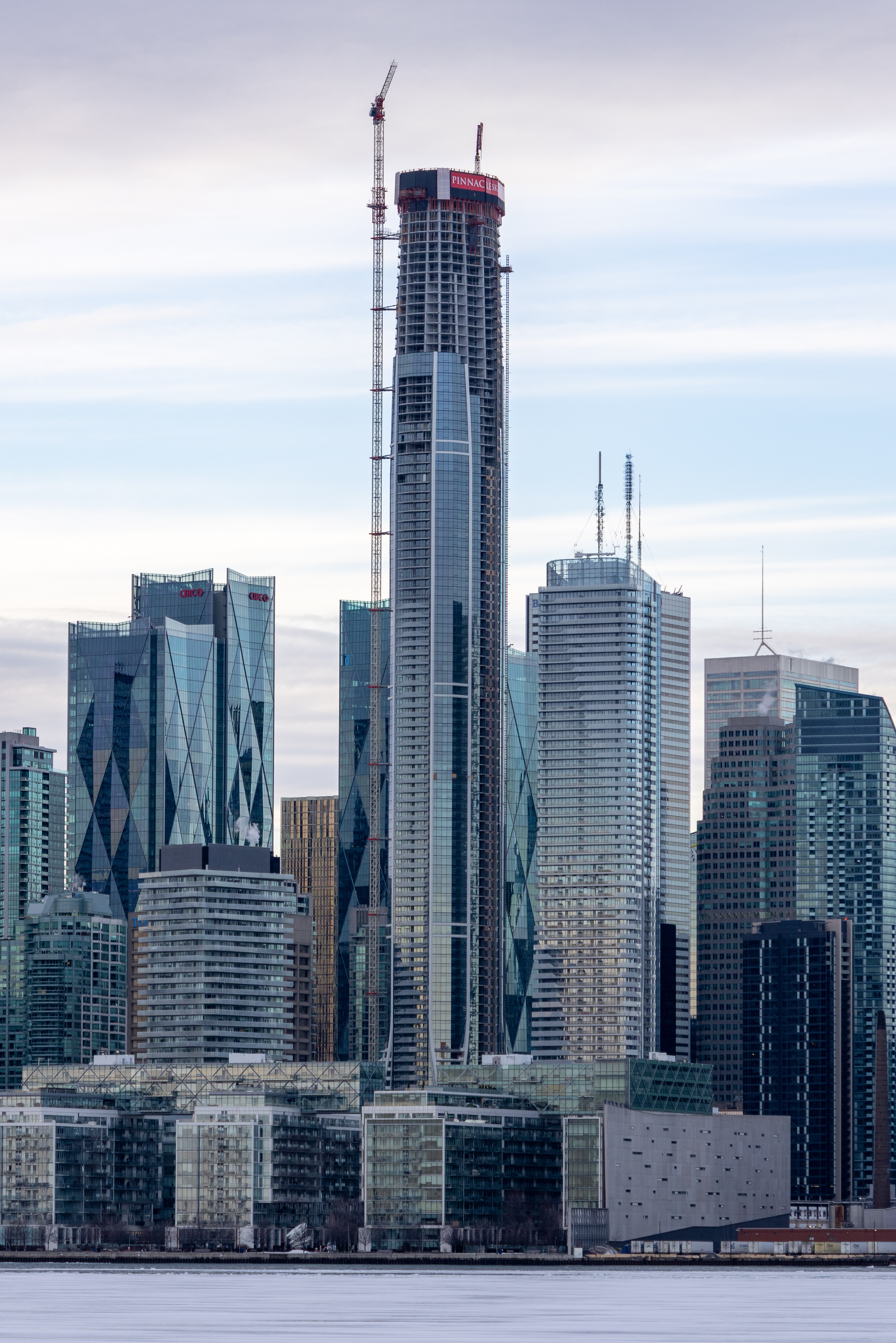
SkyTower under construction in February 2026

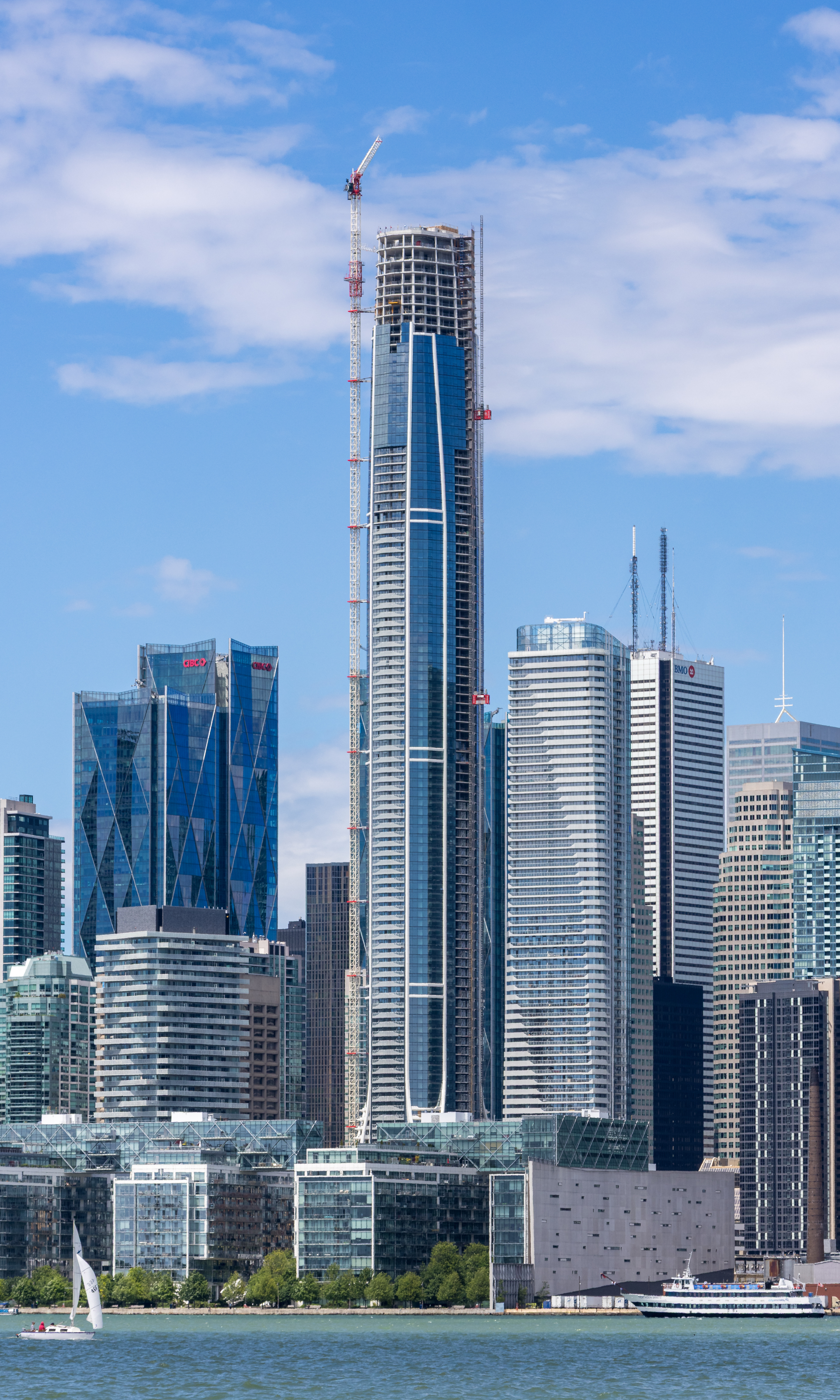
SkyTower under construction in June 2026

== See also ==
- List of tallest buildings in Toronto
