= ICE Condominiums =

Skyscraper complex in Toronto

ICE Condominiums II
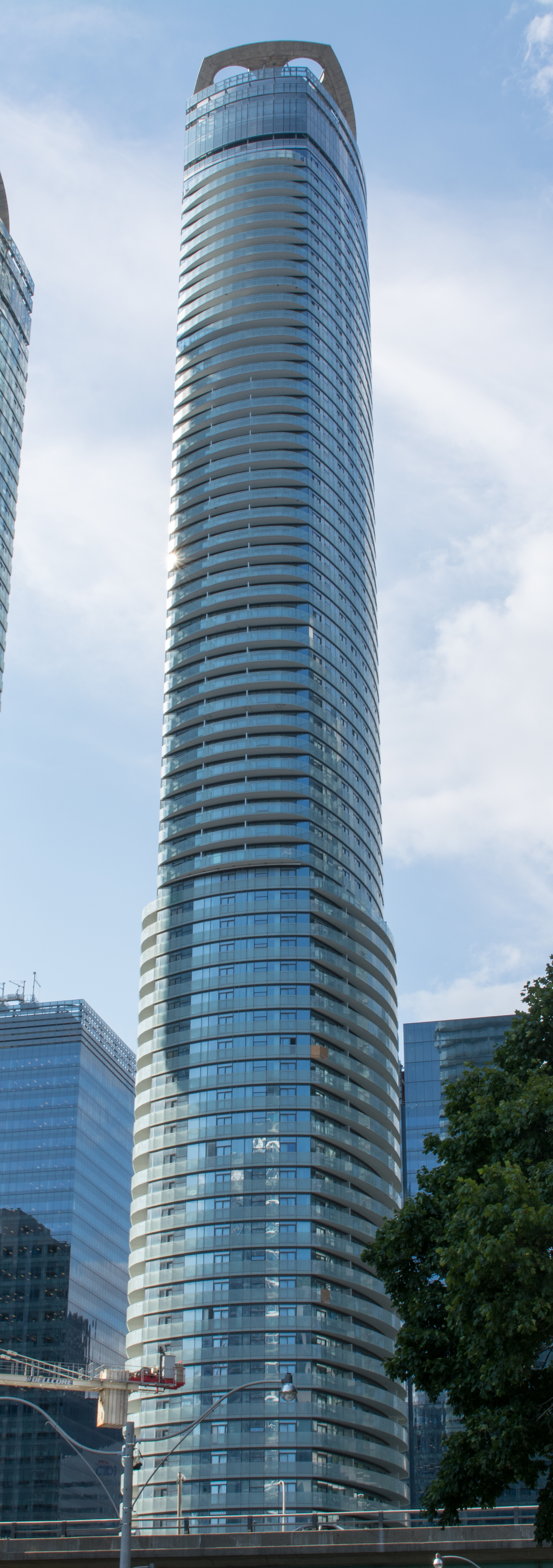

General information
- Status: Completed
- Location: 14 York Street; Toronto, Ontario, Canada
- Coordinates: 43°38′31.2″N 79°22′53.8″W
- Completed: 2015

Height
- Height: 234.2 metres (768 ft)
- Top floor: 212.5 metres (697 ft)

Technical details
- Floor count: 67

Design and construction
- Architect: architects—Alliance
- Developer: Lanterra Developments, Cadillac Fairview

ICE Condominiums I
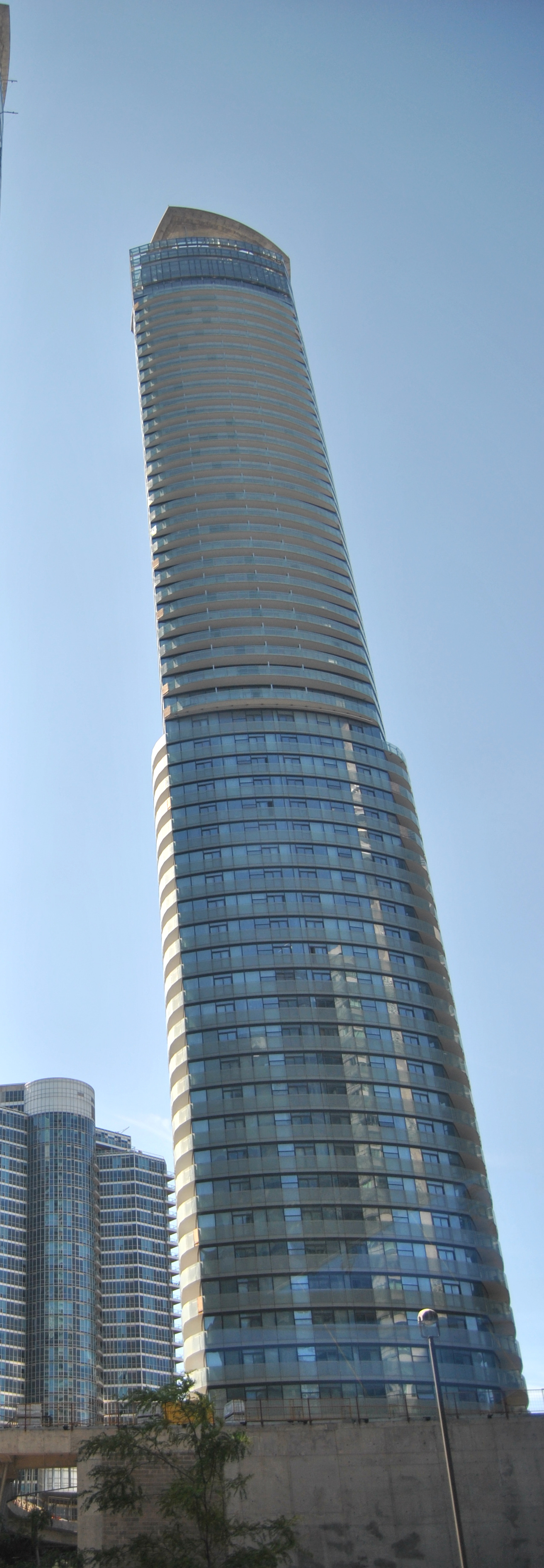

General information
- Status: Completed
- Location: 12 York Street; Toronto, Ontario, Canada
- Coordinates: 43°38′29.9″N 79°22′55.3″W
- Completed: 2014

Height
- Height: 202.3 metres (664 ft)
- Top floor: 178.9 metres (587 ft)

Technical details
- Floor count: 57

Design and construction
- Architect: architects—Alliance
- Developer: Lanterra Developments, Cadillac Fairview

ICE Condominiums is a high-rise residential complex in downtown Toronto, Ontario, Canada. The development consists of two condominiums completed in 2014 and 2015. With 67 stories above ground and a height of 234.2 m (768 ft), the buildings are the 10th tallest in Toronto.

The building is home to numerous short-term rentals and units available on Airbnb, which was given exclusive hosting rights. The condominiums have been described as a "ghost hotel".

== History ==
Construction of the building was proposed in 2007, with construction beginning in 2011 and completing in 2015.

In 2019, CBC News reported that the ICE Condos ranked number one among Toronto addresses with complaints about short-term rentals, with 311 in total.

In 2023, Airbnb was exclusively given rights for short-term rentals at the complex. Rajat Sharma, ICE board director and himself an Airbnb "superhost" who owns multiple units in the condo, was accused by the Condominium Authority Tribunal of harassing the building management's and "intruding into the operations of [the condominium] in a disruptive way."

=== Safety issues ===
On May 7, 2015, there was a fire at the second tower; no injuries were ultimately reported.

The condominiums have faced criticism from residents over garbage disposal and elevator safety concerns. A resident's TikTok video in 2021 depicting the building's elevator issues, including an outage that left only one elevator available for 29 floors in a 4 month period, received over 300,000 likes. In response, the complex's management disputed the claims made in the video, stating "With respect to a TikTok video and comments circulating, ICE Condominiums disagrees with many of the comments made".

==== Shooting incidents ====
Since the condominiums opened, shootings at the complex have received media attention, with critics linking the prevalence of shootings to the number of short-term residencies.

In 2018, a man was shot in the chest on the 16th floor of ICE I and found with life-threatening injuries before being ultimately taken to a hospital. In 2020, stray bullets in October 2020 shot through the walls at ICE Condominiums. Five people were ultimately arrested in connection to the shooting.

In March 2025, a 16-year-old boy was shot and killed at the building and a suspect was charged with second-degree murder.
