= Harbour Plaza =

Mixed use development in the South Core district of Toronto, Ontario

Harbour Plaza Residences
- Harbour Plaza Residences

General information
- Status: Completed
- Location: 88-100 Harbour Street, Toronto, Canada
- Coordinates: 43.64185°N 79.37909°W

Website
- www.menkescondorentals.com/building.php?Harbour-Plaza-5

Harbour Plaza Residences is a mixed-use development in the South Core district of Toronto, Ontario. It consists of 63- and 67-storey condominium towers and 200,000 square feet of retail space. Harbour Plaza's soaring towers are anchored by a retail podium, in addition to the One York Street commercial office tower also known as the Sun Life Financial Tower. The two residential towers, rising to 233 m (764 ft) and 224 m (735 ft), are the tallest twin buildings in Canada. The complex was developed by Menkes Developments and Oxford Properties Group.

Among the tenants of the four-storey retail podium are Mercatino, Pure Fitness, and Winners.

The buildings were completed in 2016.

== PATH ==
There will be an addition to the PATH network that will connect Queens Quay to Union Station.
