= Sugar Wharf =

Coordinates: 43.64363°N 79.37117°W

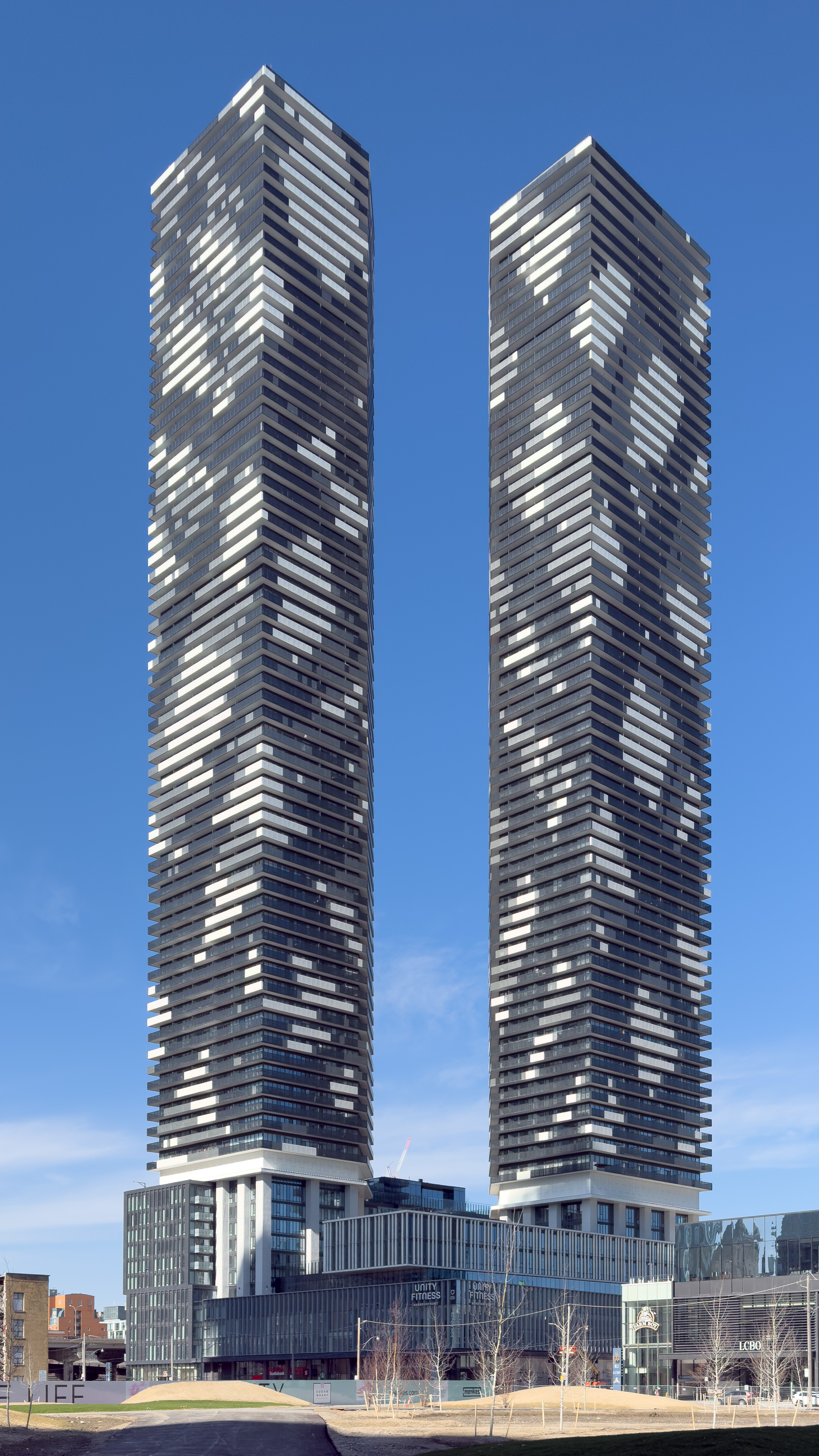
Sugar Wharf Condominiums in 2025

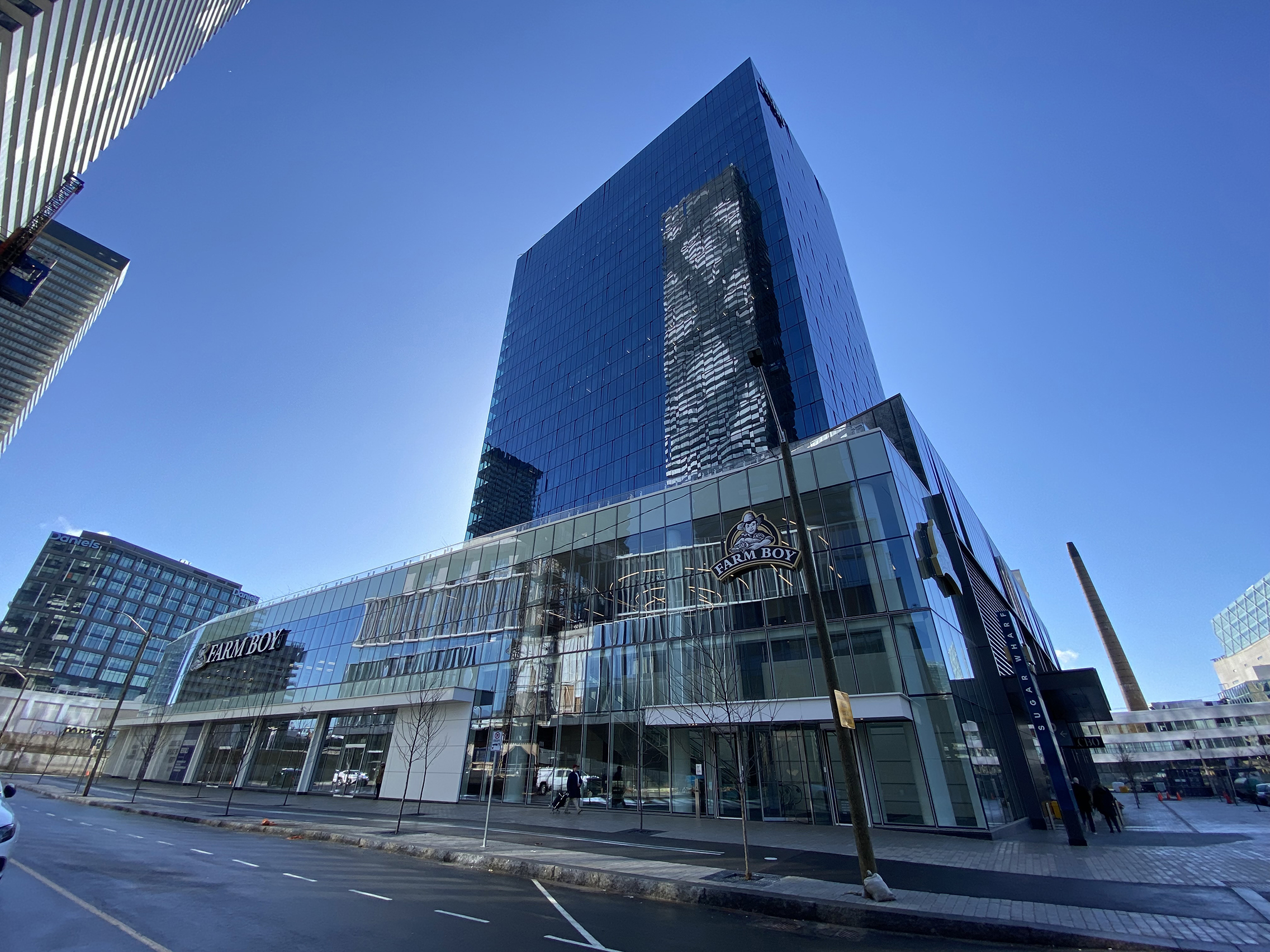
LCBO Headquarters at 100 Queens Quay East

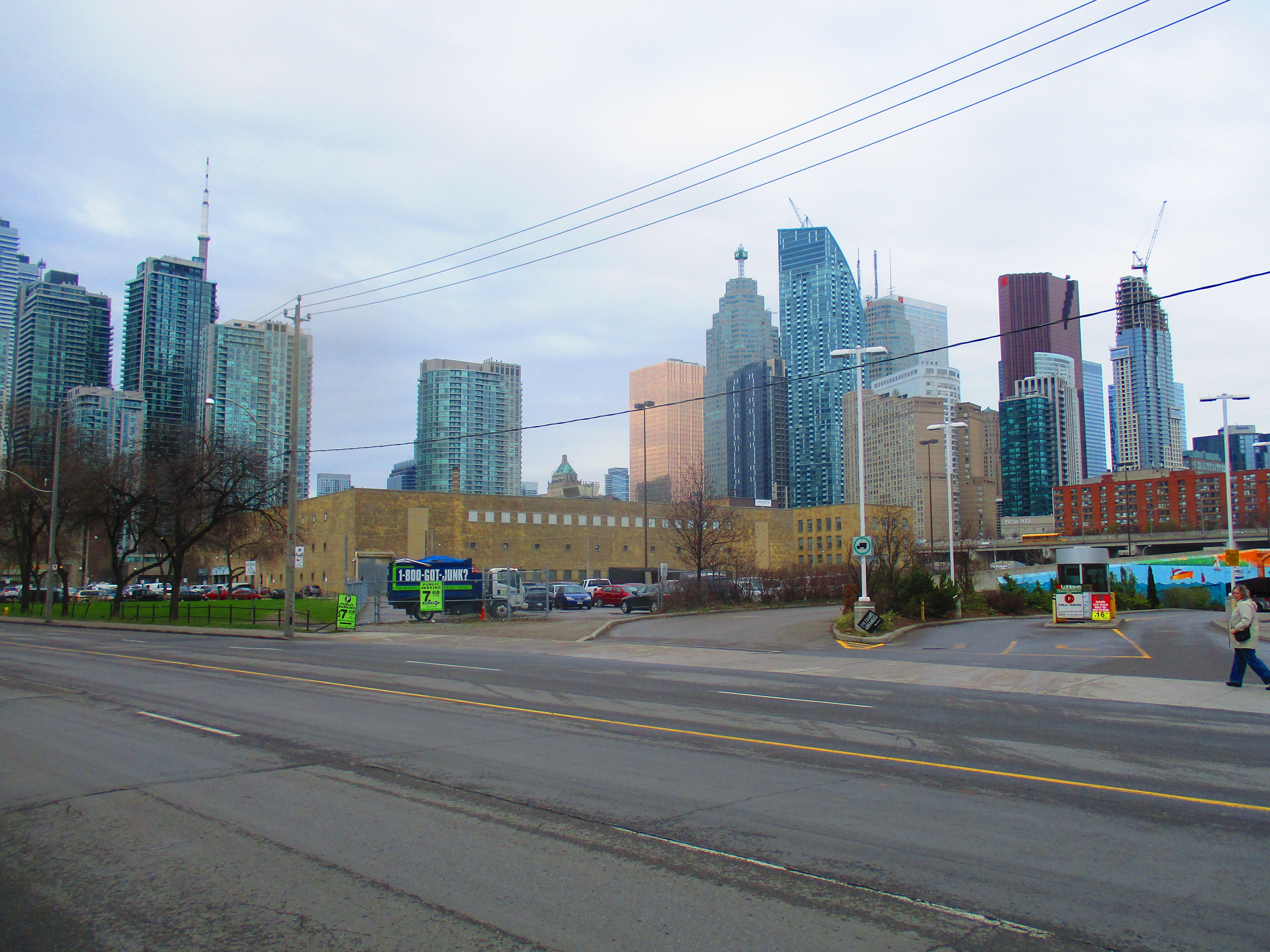
The site of Sugar Wharf in 2017, prior to construction. Note the LCBO warehouse, which will later be incorporated into the development

Sugar Wharf is a mixed-use development currently under construction at Queens Quay East, across the street from the Redpath Sugar Refinery, in Toronto, Ontario. It will contain five high-rise condo towers ranging in height from 64 to 90 storeys, a mid-rise rental residential building, and a multi level retail space that will contain a grocery store and an LCBO. All buildings will be connected to the PATH network.

The development is projected to house 8,000 residents.

The 4.7-hectare (12-acre) parcel cost $260 million when purchased in May 2016. Originally, the central building on the site was the headquarters of the Liquor Control Board of Ontario, and a large attached warehouse.
