= Rail Deck Park =

Proposed urban park development in Toronto, Canada

Rail Deck Park is a proposed large urban park in downtown Toronto, Ontario, Canada. Announced on August 3, 2016, the park will be set on a constructed deck that encloses the active Railway Lands between Bathurst Street and Blue Jays Way, west of the Rogers Centre. In total, the park will span 8.5 hectares (21 acres) when constructed. As of November 2017, the City of Toronto estimated the park to cost $1.66 billion. In May 2020, the Canadian Taxpayers Federation released a study saying that once exclusions from the city's estimates are factored in the park would cost more than $3.7 billion.

The plan was met with acclaim in local and national media, and was likened to other similar city rail yard redevelopment projects in North America, such as Millennium Park in Chicago and Hudson Yards in New York City.

== Development ==
=== Background ===
The plan was first announced in August 2016 at a presentation to the news media in the CityPlace neighbourhood, south of the Railway Lands near Bathurst Street. The announcement was made by Toronto Mayor John Tory and Joe Cressy, city councillor representing the Trinity—Spadina ward who described the project as a legacy for the city.

Development of the park would require the City of Toronto government to purchase air rights of the Railway Lands, which is currently owned by Canadian National Railway, Toronto Terminals Railway and Metrolinx. Costs or timeline of construction of the park were not divulged, but was preliminarily described by Tory to cost "tens of millions of dollars per acre". Toronto chief planner Jennifer Keesmaat will present a detailed report to City Council on the Rail Deck Park proposal in Fall 2017. In December 2017, the Toronto City Council voted in favour of pushing ahead planned work for Rail Deck Park in a 36–4 vote.

=== Potential extension ===
Following the initial announcement of the proposed park, the Toronto Star suggested that Rail Deck Park could help revive plans for Oxford Place by Oxford Properties in 2013 to redevelop the Metro Toronto Convention Centre, located east of the proposed park, into public space. A potential eastward extension of Rail Deck Park to include Oxford Place could place the park among the largest rail deck parks in the world, with a total combined park area of nearly 10.5 hectares (26 acres).

=== Over Rail Corridor Area (ORCA) project ===
In May 2017, a new development submission was made to the City of Toronto by a consortium identified as P.I.T.S. Developments Inc. The plan amendment called for the north end of the rail corridor to be redeveloped with eight high-rise towers, while just over half of the lot—some 12.8 acres—would be devoted to a new public park on the south half of the site. PITS claimed to have development rights purchased from Toronto Terminal Railway, over a significant area of the rail corridor. The City of Toronto chose to oppose the project and rejected ORCA's proposed rezoning in 2018. ORCA appealed the rezoning ruling to the Ontario Local Planning Appeal Tribunal (LPAT). In July 2019, ORCA lost its appeal of the City of Toronto's rezoning of the air rights over the railway tracks for parklands. ORCA will be compensated by the City of Toronto through negotiations or the city will expropriate.

In 2020, the developers submitted a revised project plan, designed by Moshe Safdie with upgraded amenities, addressing some of the city's objections to the previous plan. This was again opposed by the city, which wanted to start expropriation instead. In response, the developers offered to sell the air rights for CA$340 million, lease them for CA$25 million per year for 49 years with the option to purchase the rights at the end of the lease for CA$1, or allow expropriation at a price set by City real estate agency CreateTO. The new proposal moved to the LPAT for a ruling. In 2021, LPAT reversed its earlier ruling, stating that the city was wrong to reject the development. In its ruling, LPAT noted the lack of progress in the Rail Deck Park plan, negotiations to purchase the developer's air rights or initiate expropriation proceedings. The developer subsequently dropped the Safdie proposed development plan reverting to its previous plan which offered fewer amenities to the city. Safdie himself warned the city of this new tactic, stating that development projects in Toronto were being approved, then subsequently revised to provide a lower-quality, lower-cost development in place of an approved project.

== See also ==
- The Bentway
