= Railway Lands =

Redevelopment district in Toronto, Ontario, Canada

Coordinates: 43.644662°N 79.380770°W

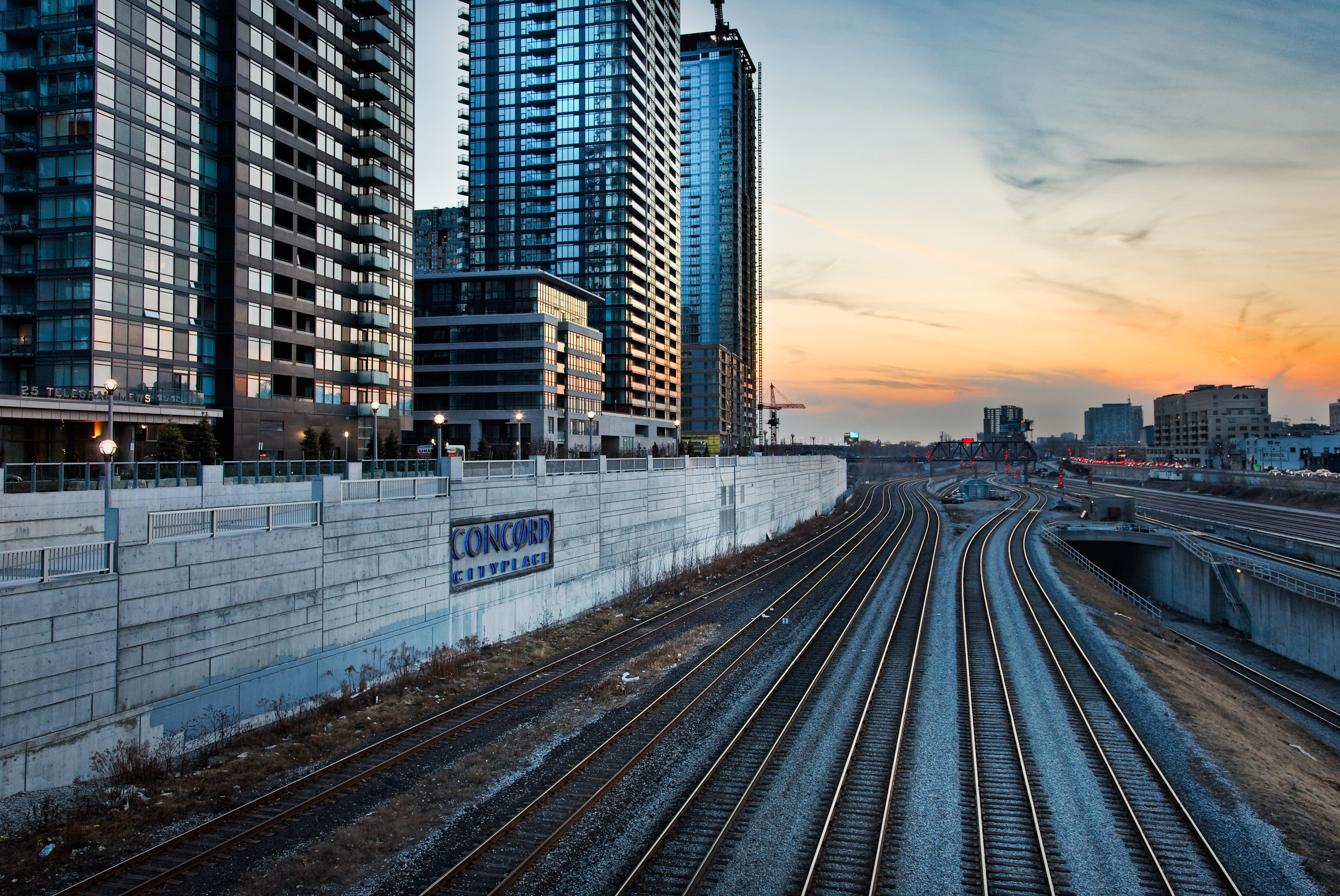
The Railway Lands and the Union Station Rail Corridor. The Corridor is the last remaining rail connection in the area.

Railway Lands is an area in downtown Toronto, Ontario, Canada. Originally a large railway switching yard near the Toronto waterfront, including the CNR Spadina Roundhouse and the CPR John Roundhouse, it has since been redeveloped and today is home to mostly mixed-used development, including the CN Tower and Rogers Centre. The lands were owned and maintained by the Canadian National Railway and later transferred to the federal crown corporation Canada Lands Company. The area is bounded by Front Street, Yonge Street, Gardiner Expressway and Bathurst Street. The western portion of the Railway Lands is now part of the CityPlace neighbourhood and the eastern portion is now called South Core.

== History ==
=== Early history ===
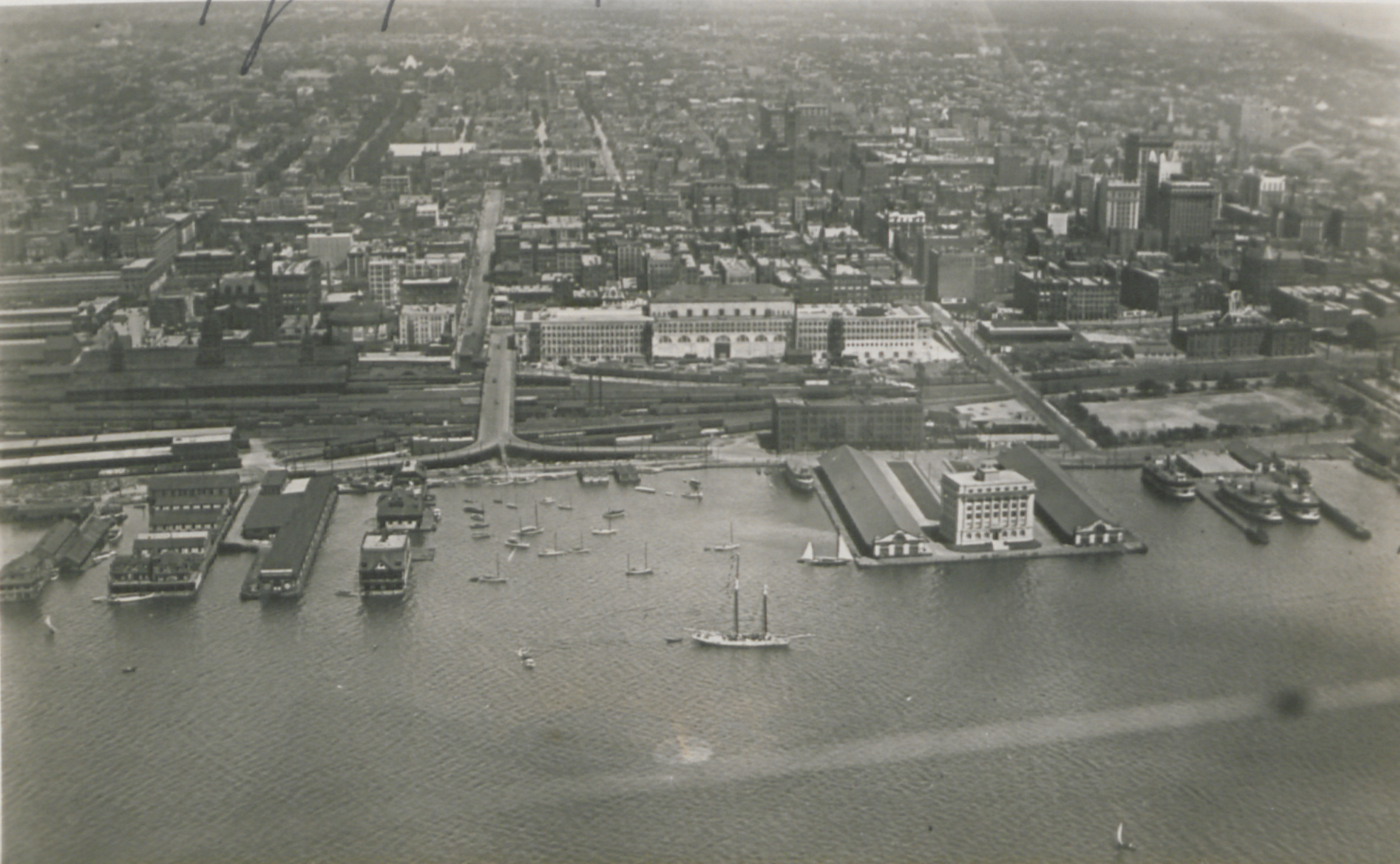
The Railway Lands between the Toronto waterfront and Front Street, c. 1919. The area saw a build up of rail lines from the 1850s to the 1920s.

The first railway, Ontario, Simcoe and Huron (OS&H), arrived in Toronto in 1853 with a station located near the current Union Station. Rivals Grand Trunk Railway and Great Western Railway arrived in Toronto to compete with OS&H. The competition placed a strain on the new station and by 1873 a new Union Station was built by the GTR. In the 1880s Grand Trunk Railway acquired rival railways (GWR in 1882 and OS&H in 1888) and the Canadian Pacific Railway arrived in the city in 1888.

The competition soon meant the second station was strained as well and by 1900 there was a need for a newer station. From the 1850s to 1920s the area south of the railway lands were filled in to accommodate railway needs. From 1858 onwards the railway expanded in area as the first Union Station was built. From the 1850s to 1920s, the area south of Front Street was filled in to provide more room for railways, industrial growth and harbour needs.

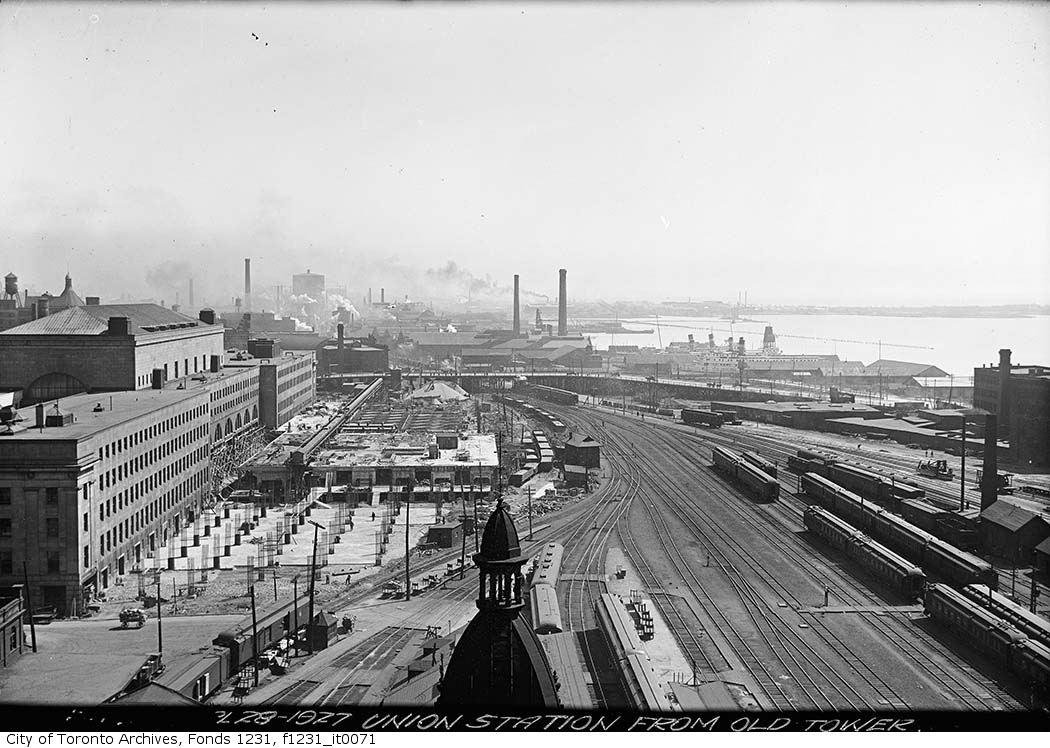
Toronto's third Union Station nearing its completion, next to the Union Station Rail Corridor, 1927.

On July 13, 1906, the Toronto Terminals Railway (TTR) was incorporated to "construct, provide, maintain and operate at the City of Toronto a union passenger station". It was also responsible for the entire 6.4 kilometres (4.0 miles) long railway corridor on either side of the station, between west of Bathurst Street and the Don River, known as the Union Station Rail Corridor (USRC).

The TTR was jointly owned by the Grand Trunk Railway and the Canadian Pacific Railway who each held 50% of the TTR shares. During station construction, the Grand Trunk Railway went bankrupt, was fully nationalized by the Government of Canada, and merged into the Canadian National Railway which would assume the Grand Trunk's 50% ownership of the TTR (and thus the third Union Station).

Union Station was opened on August 6, 1927, by the Prince of Wales, although it was not completed yet. Four days later, the track network was shifted from the former second Union Station. To get to trains, passengers would walk from the south doors to the tracks located several hundred feet to the south while the new USRC viaduct, concourse and train shed was under construction. Demolition of the second Union Station began almost immediately and was completed in 1928. The third Union Station was not fully completed until 1930 when construction of the train shed had finished. The first major change to the Station took place in 1954 when the Toronto Transit Commission opened its Union subway station adjacent to Union Station, buried beneath Front Street.

=== Redevelopment ===
==== 1960s–1980s ====
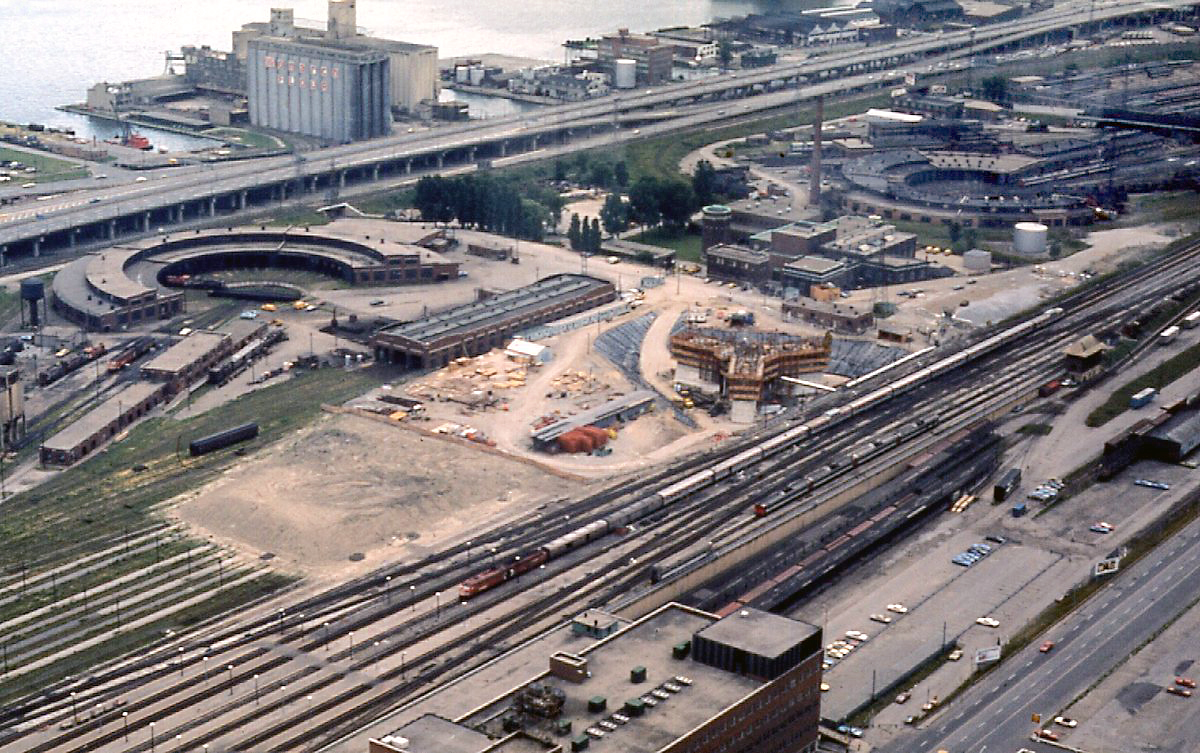
Construction for the CN Tower in railway lands in 1973. The area was to be redeveloped, with the GTA's rail lines centralized in nearby Vaughan. However, most of these plans were scrapped after the tower's completion.

Going as far back as 1965, when Canadian National (CN) began to shift the functions of many of its yards in the Greater Toronto Area to a centralized facility in the northern suburb of Vaughan, the railways lands were made redundant. The yards' layout was also becoming increasingly outdated then. The area was then slated for re-development for post-railway beginning with plans for the building of a communications tower (the CN Tower) and the massive Metro Centre. Two years into the construction of the CN Tower, plans for Metro Centre were scrapped, leaving the tower isolated on the Railway Lands in what was then a largely abandoned light-industrial space. Development of the Railway Lands slowed between the 1970s and 1980. The early 1980s saw more redevelopment, with the opening of the Metro Convention Centre in 1984. The late 1980s saw the building of the SkyDome (for which the CNR Spadina Roundhouse was demolished) and the SkyWalk connecting the SkyDome with Union Station. Toronto Railway Lands are not for sale.

==== 1990s–2000s ====
In the early 1990s redevelopment slowed, but it did see the expansion of the convention centre and the John Street Roundhouse redeveloped into the Roundhouse Park, though it would not be restored until the 2000s. It also saw the redevelopment of the Toronto Postal Building into the Air Canada Centre (since renamed to Scotiabank Arena) in the late 1990s along the eastern boundary of the Railway Lands.

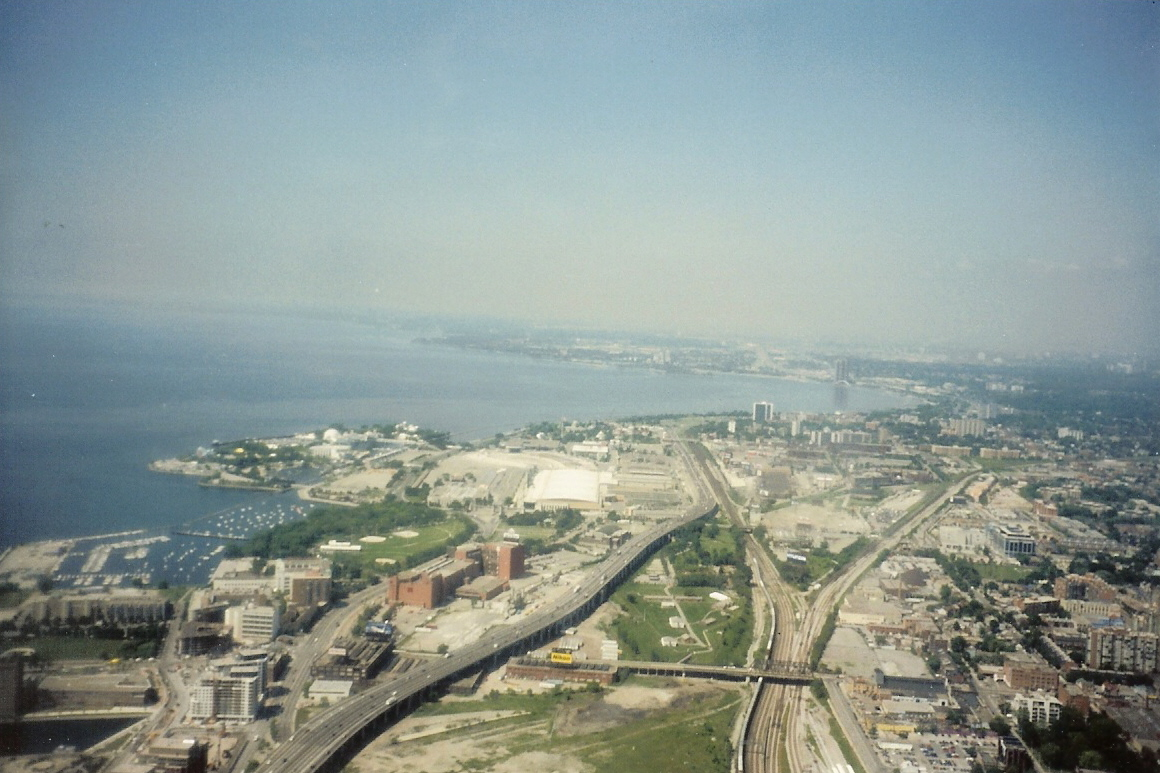
Railway lands west of the CN Tower in 1999. Shortly after the new millennium, the area saw new development that changed the area forever.

In the early 21st Century, the remaining area began to change rapidly with residential and then commercial development changing the area's past use. The western portion of the Railway Lands, defined by the city as Railway Lands West, is today home to the CityPlace neighbourhood built just west of Spadina Avenue, south of Front Street and north of the Gardiner Expressway. Railway Lands Central is mixed use land slightly east of Spadina to the area east of the CN Tower is home to Rogers Centre and CN Tower and parts of CityPlace. Railway Lands East is now the South Core neighbourhood and is a mixed used land slightly east of Rogers Centre and is home to Union Station (and Union Station Bus Terminal), Dominion Public Building, SkyWalk, Metro Toronto Convention Centre, Roundhouse Park, Steam Whistle Brewing, Southcore Financial Centre, Delta Hotel Toronto, CIBC Square, Maple Leaf Square and the aforementioned Scotiabank Arena.

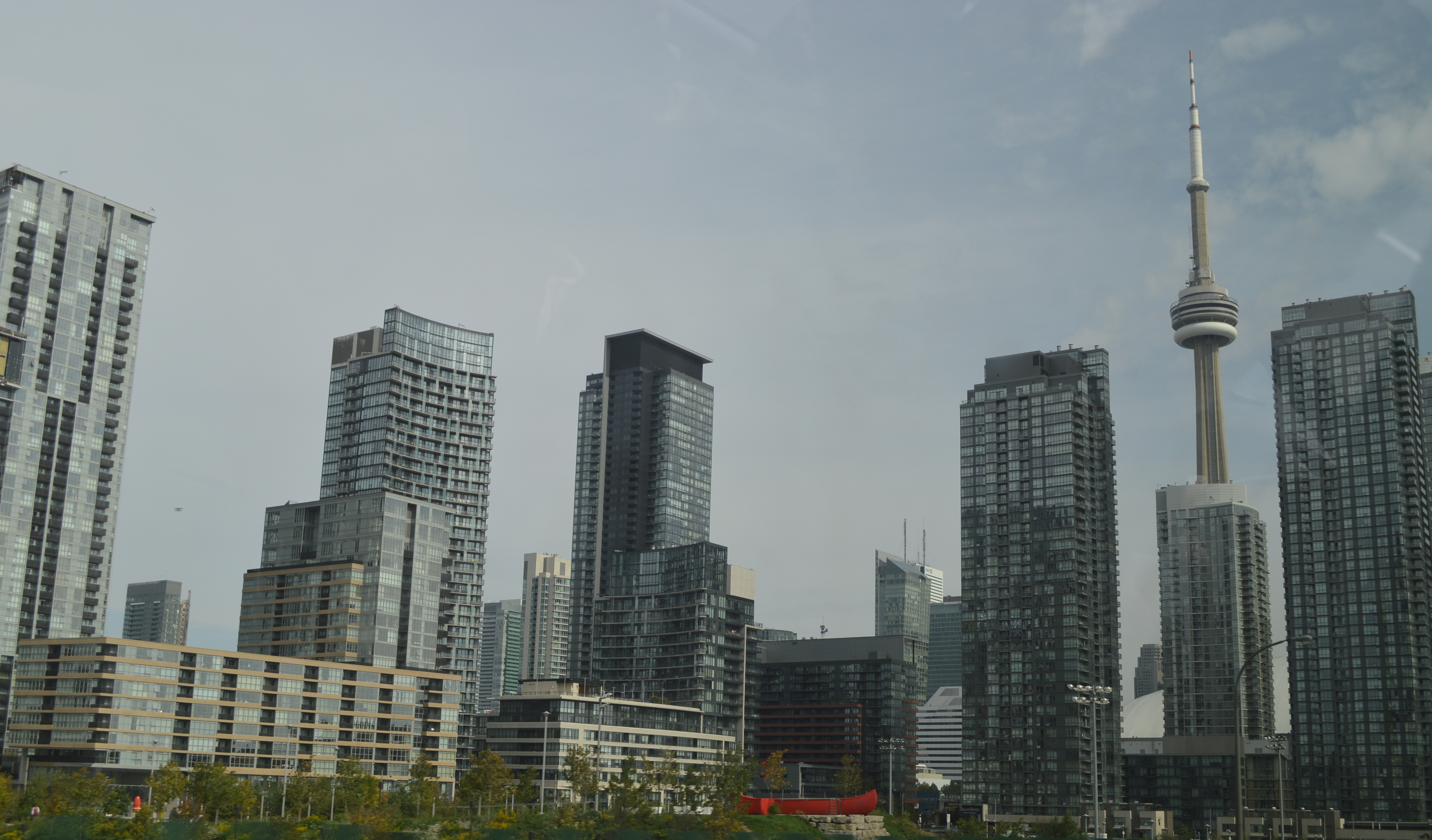
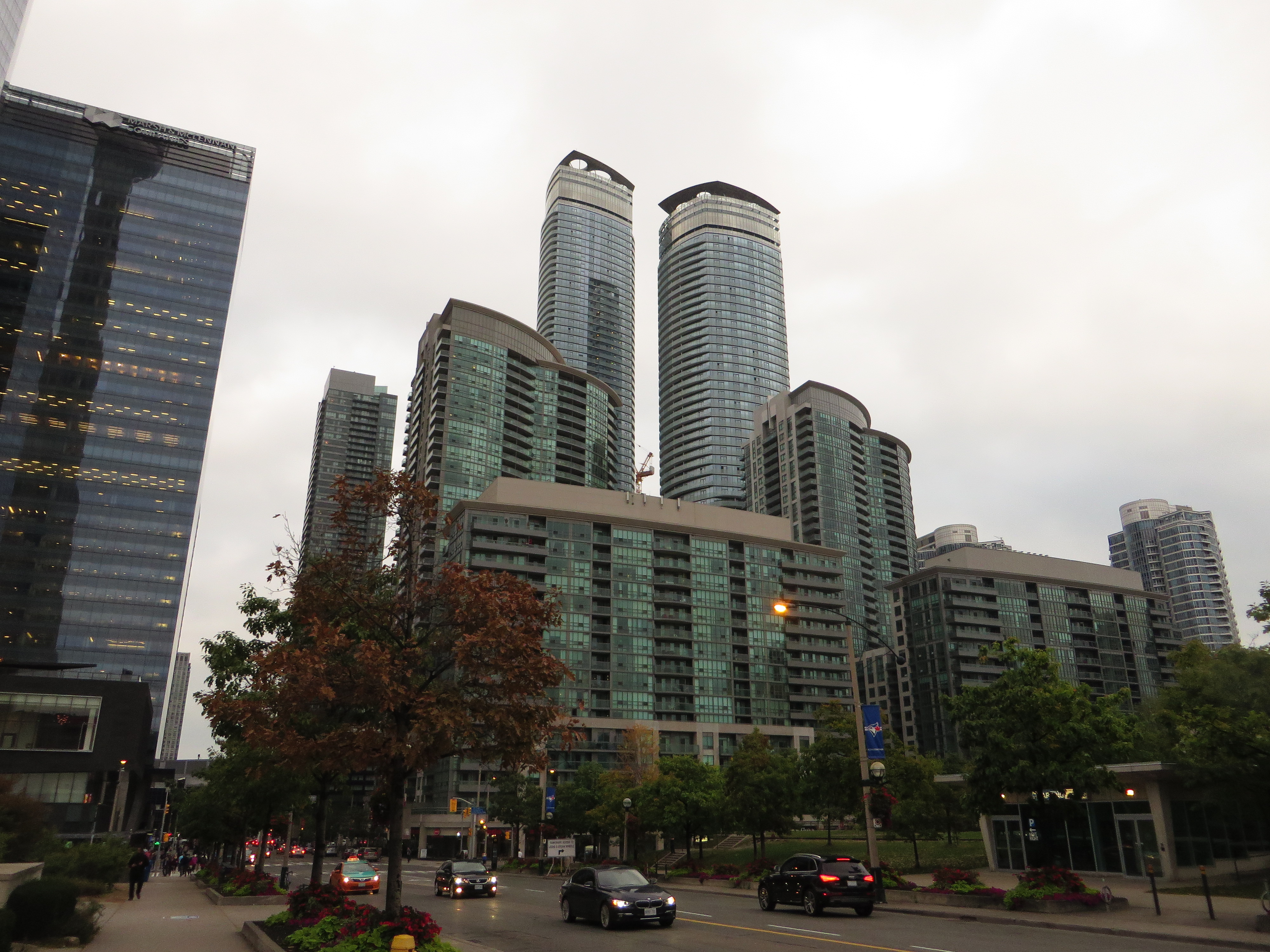
The railway lands were redeveloped in the early 21st century, with its western portion becoming the neighbourhood of CityPlace (left) and its eastern portion South Core (right).

On August 3, 2016, Mayor John Tory announced a proposal to create a Rail Deck Park, decking over the Railway Lands West section to provide additional parkland in Downtown Toronto. The proposed greenspace would comprise 8.3 hectares.

The only remaining rail connection is the Union Station Rail Corridor, which is maintained by Toronto Terminals Railway and consists of the narrow area used by tracks leading into and out of Union Station. The SkyWalk transverses a large part of the former Railway Lands, connecting Union Station with the lands south of the rail corridor.

== See also ==
- Old Canadian National rail yard, a similar redevelopment in Edmonton
