= Victor Fraser =

Canadian sidewalk artist and poet

Victor Fraser is a sidewalk artist and poet based in Toronto, Ontario. He has been painting paved surfaces for the past 20 years, painting in six countries. His works are usually inspired by world events.

== Notable works ==
- The Alphabet on Queen St. E., and Danforth Avenue in Toronto, Canada
- "We Love MCR" in Piccadilly Square in Manchester, UK, following the Manchester Arena bombing.
- "Strength to Manchester" at Toronto's British Consulate, and on the steps of Nathan Phillips Square.
- "Humboldt Strong" outside the city hall in Humboldt, Ontario, following the Humboldt Broncos bus crash.
- "Force De Paris" in 3 different locations around Toronto.
- "Love" in 5 different languages on Yonge Street in Toronto, following the Toronto van attack.
- "David Bowie Forever" on Queen Street West in Toronto, following the death of David Bowie.
- The Toronto Maple Leafs logo outside Maple Leaf Square in Toronto, Ontario

== Technique ==
Fraser regularly paints public artwork without approval. He is a self-taught painter who usually starts by outlining his pieces in chalk then fills them in with water based paints or pastel chalk, depending on the project.
