= Canoe Landing Park =

Park in Toronto, Ontario, Canada

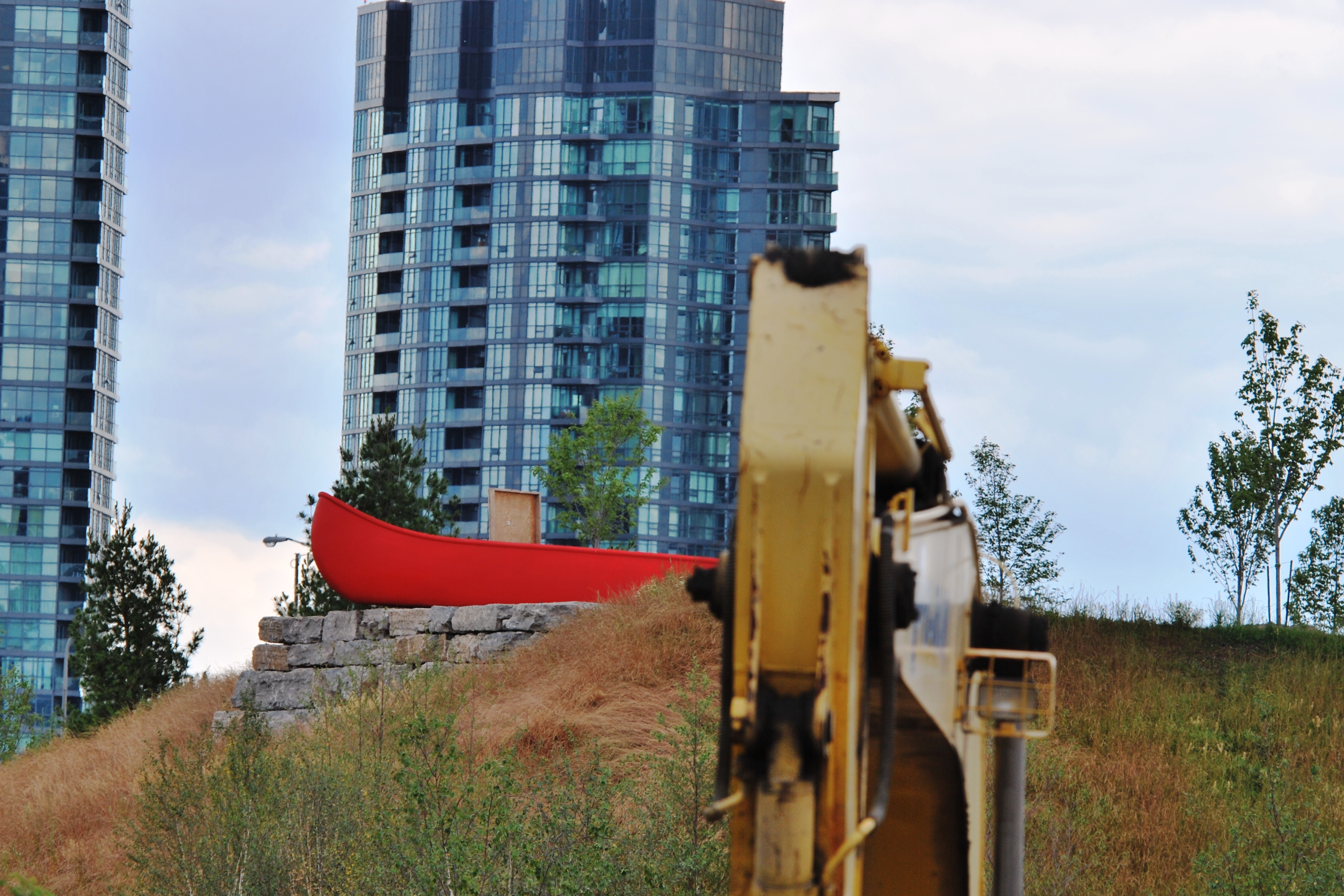
- The Red Canoe at Canoe Landing Park

- Location within Toronto
- Type: Urban Park
- Location: 95 Fort York Boulevard; Toronto, Ontario, Canada
- Coordinates: 43°38′20″N 79°23′48″W
- Area: 8 acres (3.2 ha)
- Created: 2009
- Operator: City of Toronto

Canoe Landing Park is an 8 acres (3.2 ha) privately funded urban park in downtown Toronto, Ontario, Canada, adjacent to the Gardiner Expressway in the CityPlace neighbourhood. The centerpiece of the park, the red canoe, was burned in an act of arson on April 2, 2025. The name was chosen as part of a city-run contest and the final name was announced on the t.o.night free evening commuter paper. Formerly, it was tentatively known as CityPlace Park.

The park's ribbon cutting ceremony was on September 9, 2009. The Park was designed by Landscape Architects Phillips Farevaag Smallenberg of Vancouver in collaboration with Landscape Architects, The Planning Partnership of Toronto, Public Art Consultant Karen Mills and Douglas Coupland. The park incorporates integrated artwork in the form of a landform (the bluff) and stand alone art pieces by Douglas Coupland: a canoe large enough for people to stand in and see over the Gardiner to Lake Ontario, a colourful display of large fishing bobbers, a sculptural beaver dam, programmed tree lighting (which will be more evident as the trees fill out), a pair of "iceberg benches" situated near the canoe, the "heart-shaped stone" bronze artwork which was cast from a stone retrieved by Terry's brother at the end of his journey and a one-mile run called the Terry Fox Miracle Mile.

The developers of Concord CityPlace are Concord Adex Developments. On the advice of their consultant, Karen Mills, Concord approached Douglas Coupland, the Vancouver author, artist and sculptor. Some of Douglas Coupland's other recent Toronto projects include Super Nova, a sculptural work/clock tower in North York (at the Don Mills Centre) and "Monument to the War of 1812," situated on Fleet and Bathurst street corner (just south of Old Fort York).

The canoe promontory was created as part of a proposed "earthwork" identified in the public art masterplan for Concord CityPlace (Public Art Management, Karen Mills, 1999) and was made from on site excavated fill and geosynthetic reinforcements. The hill has an elevation that allows viewers to see over the Gardiner Expressway to Lake Ontario. Some 20,000-25,000 dumptruck loads of fill were diverted from landfills.

On the night of April 2, 2025, the canoe was destroyed by fire in an apparent act of arson. No details have been released on why or if it will be rebuilt.

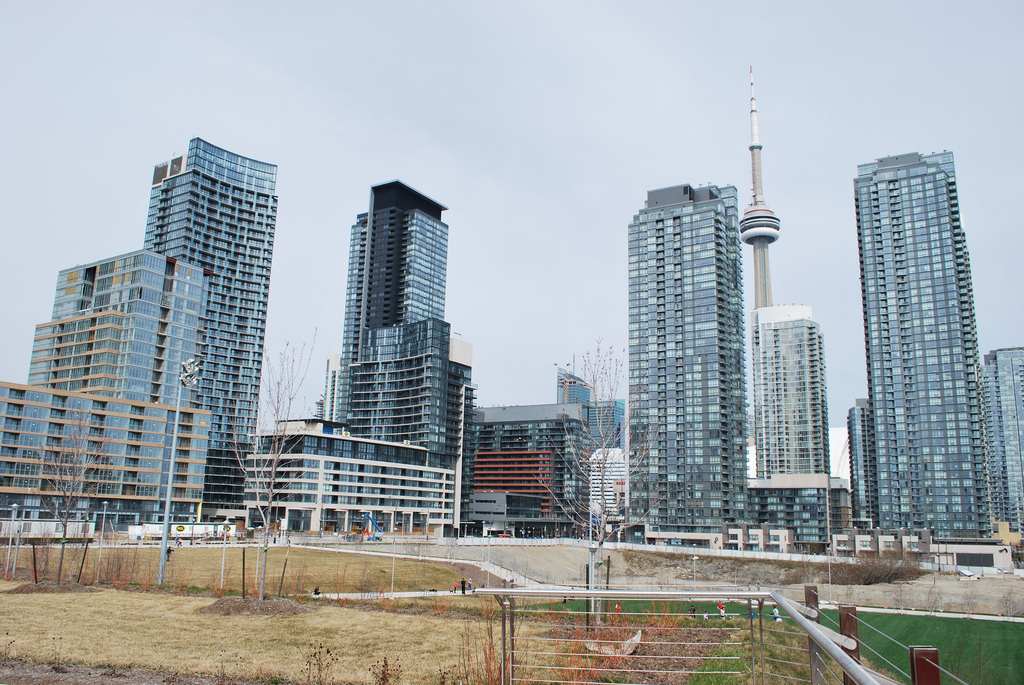
View of CityPlace from the Park

== See also ==
- List of Toronto parks
