= Ten York =

Skyscraper in Toronto, Canada

Coordinates: 43°38′28.6″N 79°22′51.9″W

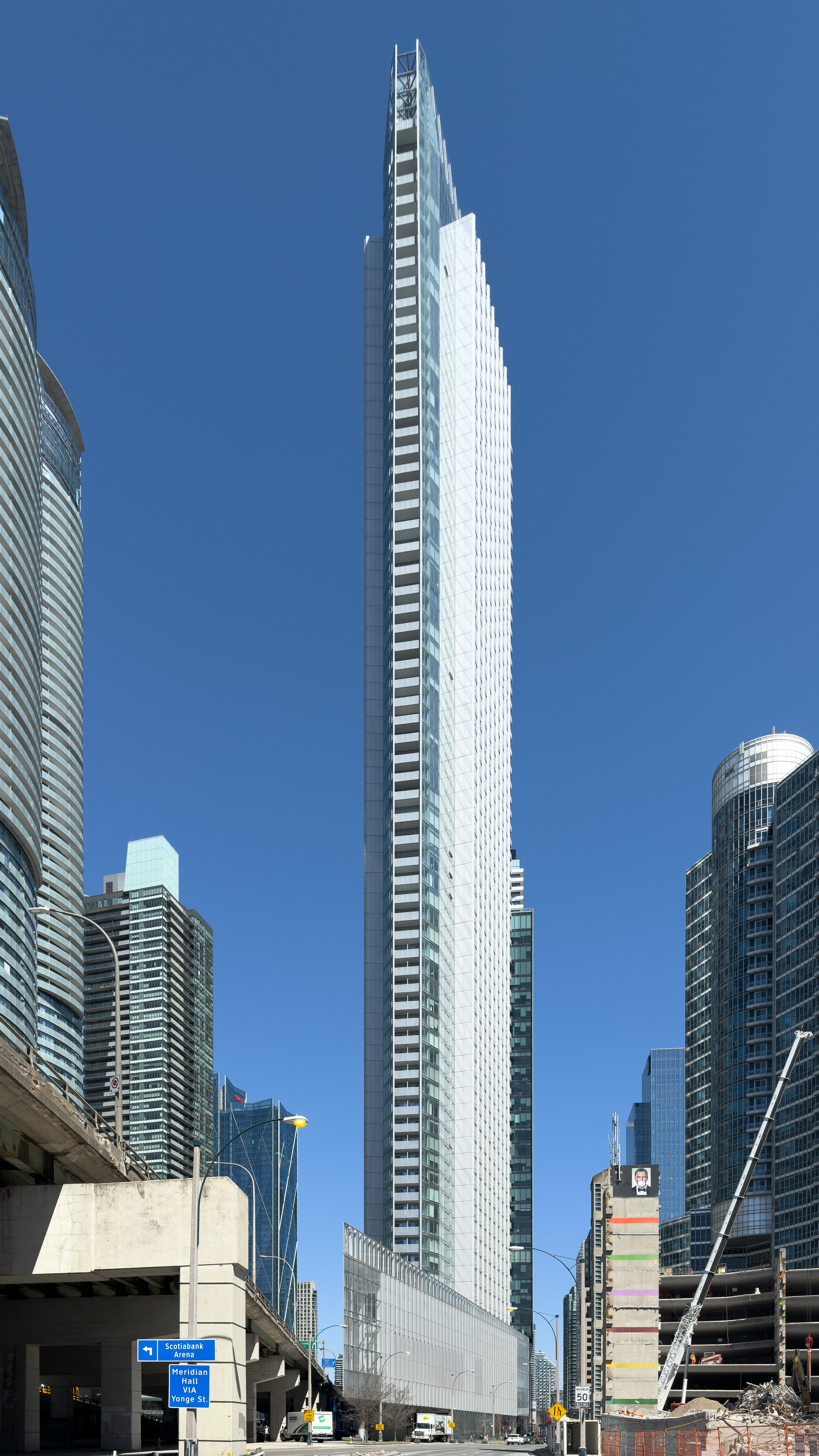
- Exterior of Ten York

General information
- Status: Completed
- Location: Toronto, Canada
- Construction started: 2013
- Completed: 2019

Height
- Height: 224 metres (735 ft)

Design and construction
- Architecture firm: Wallman Architects

Ten York is a 65-storey high-rise condominium building in the South Core, Toronto, Ontario. It contains 725 condo units.

== History ==
The project was constructed on a former parking lot and car-impound yard. Its planned height was reduced by ten storeys in 2012 while the design of the tower itself was altered and its parking lot moved underground. By November, the majority of the condos in the project had been sold. Construction began in late 2013. It was completed in 2019.

== Design ==
The tower is on a triangular plot. It is 224 metres (735 feet) tall.
