= Shellie Zhang =

Chinese artist (born 1991)

- Born: 1991 (age 34–35); Beijing, China
- Website: shelliezhang.com

Shellie Zhang (born 1991) is a Chinese multidisciplinary artist based in Toronto, Ontario. Zhang is known for work that examines memory as it relates to migration and translation.

== Carrer ==
Her 2018 exhibit A Place for Wholesome Amusement re-imagined marquees for 285 Spadina in Toronto, which previously housed the Standard Theater, a Yiddish playhouse, and the Golden Harvest Theatre, which screened kung-fu films to parallel the histories of immigrant communities in the same space at different points in time. The work was inspired by research conducted at the Ontario Jewish Archives.

Zhang's book Fusion Cuisine, Now with Added MSG! (2018), published with the Art Gallery of York University, looks at the MSG a seasoning additive in Chinese cooking, and the role xenophobia played in modern attitudes about the ingredient.

In 2019, Zhang created a project from research in the Provincial Archives of Saskatchewan, the Moosejaw Archives and Library and the City of Saskatoon Archives about the stories of early Chinese settlers in the prairies. The project, Believe it or Not, presented her findings and included seminal stories of Chinese Canadian history, such as the Supreme Court of Canada case Quong Wing v.R.

During the 2022–2023 season, Zhang's Beacons was featured along Toronto's Bentway skating trail. Her work and the Bentway's programming were centered on creating a warm public space for newcomers experiencing their first winter in Canada.

On December 16, 2022, she began as an artist in residence at The Institute of Contemporary Art, San Diego, until January 15, 2023.

In 2023, her public art project, Flowers Between, presented a visual and historical parallel between two early Chinese Canadian businesses located in the Region of Waterloo.

Zhang's work is in public collections such as the Robert McLaughlin Gallery and the McMaster Museum of Art.

== Select exhibitions ==
- Elemental - Patel Brown Gallery, Toronto, Ontario - 2023
- Surface Temperature - Patel Brown, Toronto, Ontario - 2023
- Capture Photography Festival, Vancouver, British Columbia - 2022
- To What Do We Owe this Honour - McMaster Museum of Art & Supercrawl, Hamilton, Ontario - (2020)
- Believe it or Not - AKA, Saskatoon, Saskatchewan - 2018

== Publications ==
Zhang, Shellie (2018). Fusion Cuisine: Now with Added MSG!. Art Gallery of York University. ISBN 9780921972747.
