= The Bentway =

Public space in Toronto

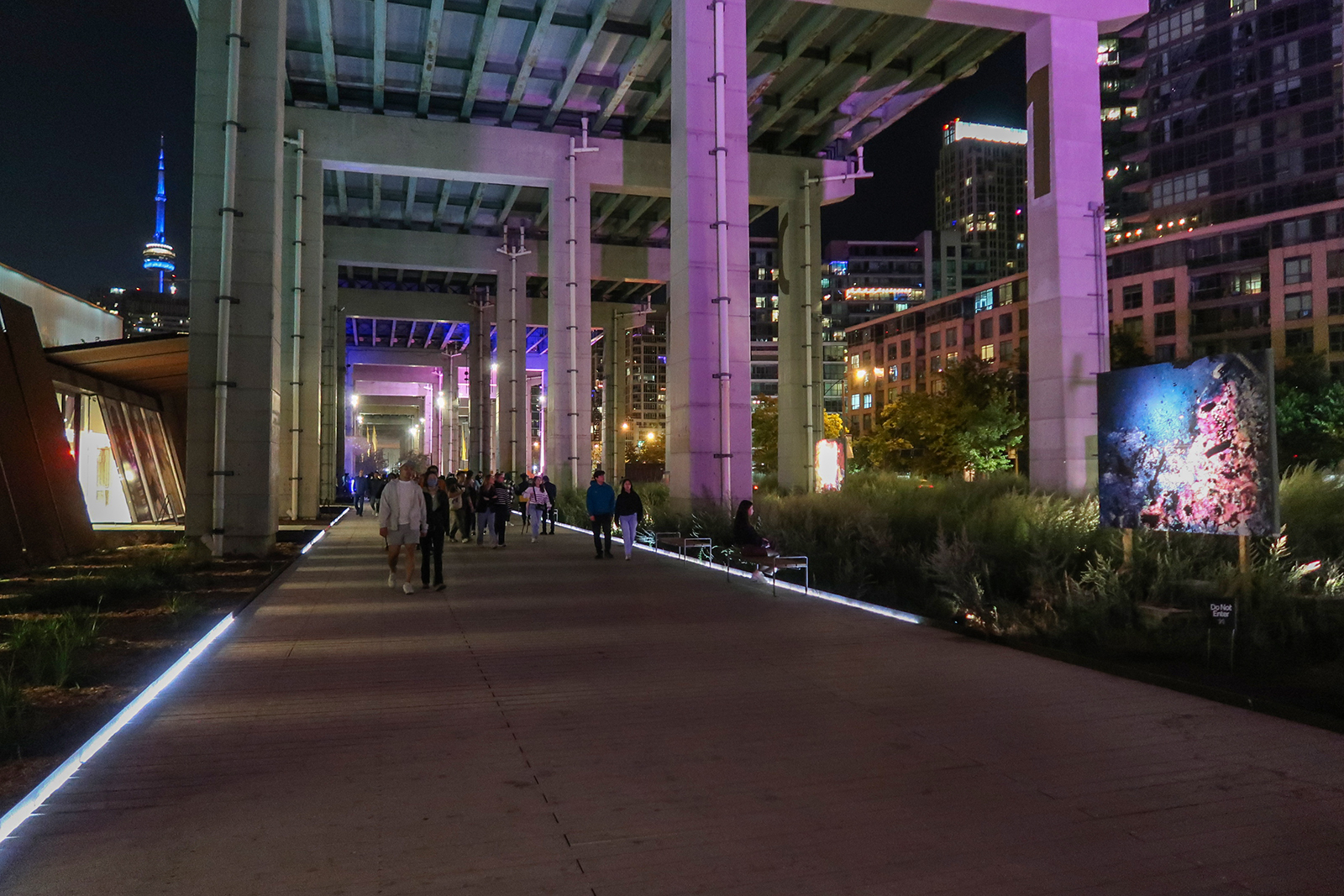
- A section of The Bentway near Garrison Common in 2023
- Length: 1.75 km (1.09 mi)
- Location: Toronto, Ontario, Canada
- Website: TheBentway.ca
Trail map

The Bentway, formerly Project: Under Gardiner, is a public trail and corridor space underneath the Gardiner Expressway in Toronto, Ontario, Canada. It is repurposed land that was in sections vacant, rail lines, parking lots and outdoor storage. The Bentway is widely cited as a leading example of adaptive reuse in urban design, transforming previously underutilized infrastructure into new public spaces.

== History ==
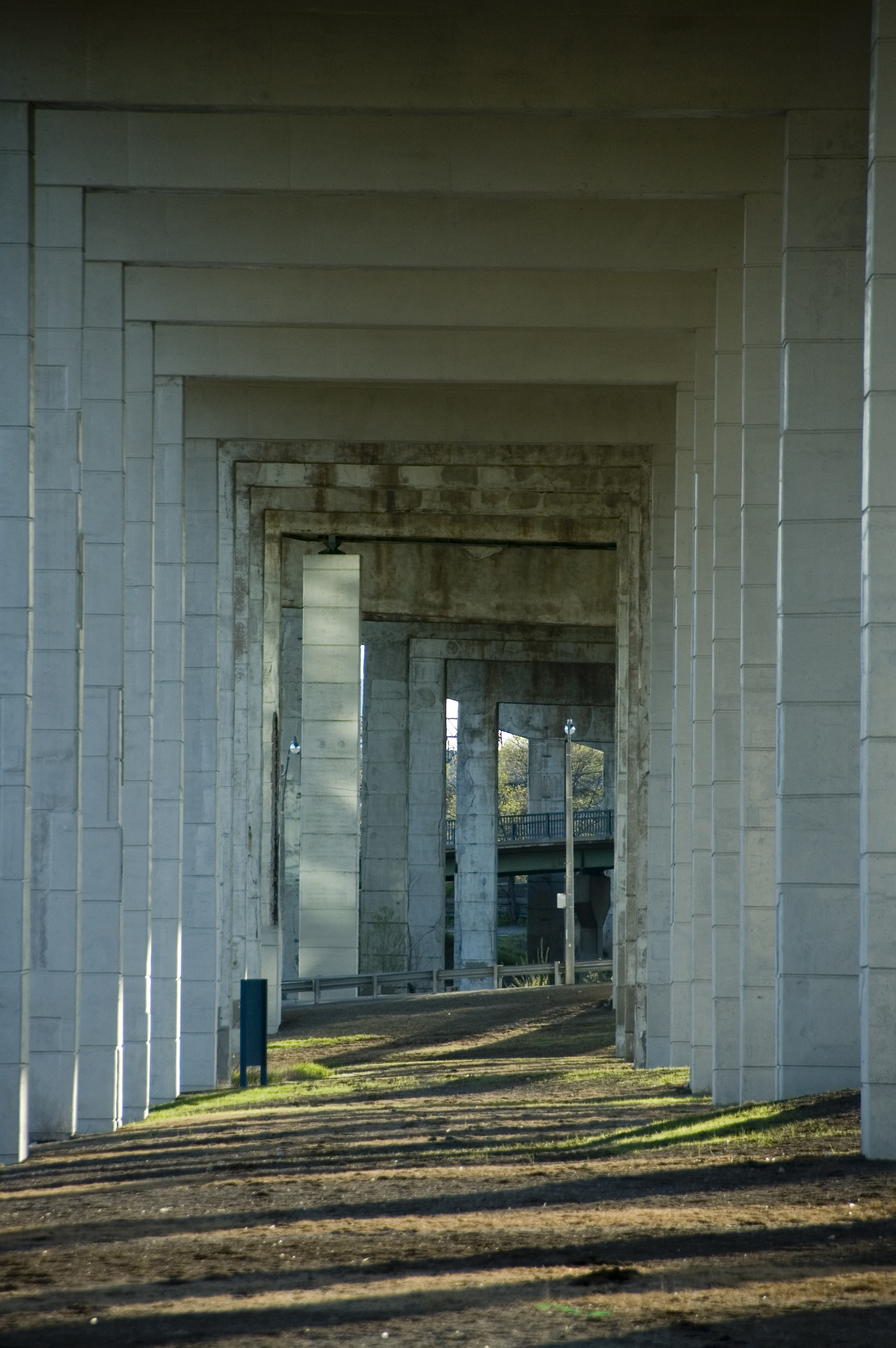
A section underneath the Gardiner Expressway near Fort York in 2007, nearly a decade before work on The Bentway began

The initial idea to transform the underside of the Gardiner Expressway into a public space came from Judy Matthews, a local Toronto urban planner and activist. On November 17, 2015, after the city's mayor approved the park initiative, Matthews donated CA$25 million for the park to the City of Toronto government through the Judy and Wilmot Matthews Foundation. The donation represented one of the most significant gifts in Toronto's history, and it was hoped that it would inspire other Torontonians to make similar philanthropic contributions to city-building initiatives. Waterfront Toronto, a revitalization agency representing the governments of Toronto, Ontario and Canada, was brought on board to collaborate with the city, along with Ken Greenberg Consultants Incorporated and Public Work to manage project planning and design.

The project was given the working name "Project: Under Gardiner". A public naming contest was launched in March 2016, and the public submitted 884 different name suggestions. A panel of 12 artists, policy experts and community leaders took the suggestions and whittled them down to a shortlist of four names: "The Artery," "The Bentway," "The Canopy," and "Gathering Place." The public voting between these four options occurred between April 28 and May 8, 2016. The Bentway remained a firm leader throughout the vote with The Artery behind in second place by 10 percentage points, but in the last hours before voting closed, Waterfront Toronto observed a surge in votes for The Artery. The legitimacy of the votes was questioned, and a second runoff vote was held between The Bentway and The Artery. On June 6, 2016, The Bentway was revealed as the new official winner of the naming contest.

Construction of the Bentway was completed in phases, with the first phase opened on January 6, 2018, including a winter skating trail.

The site was used during the 2026 FIFA World Cup, hosting the Toronto FIFA Fan Festival.

== Layout ==
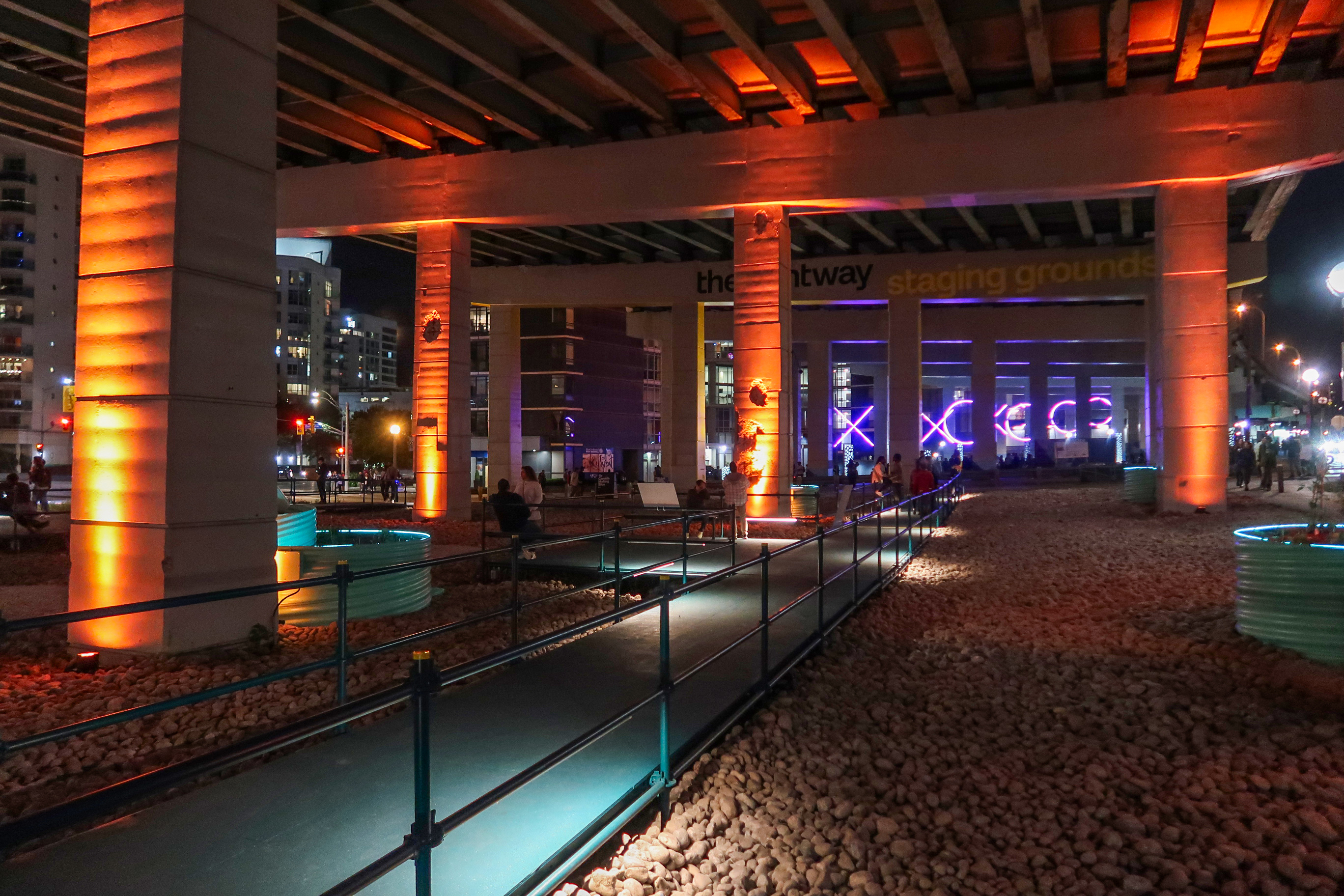
Bentway Staging Grounds near Canoe Landing Park

The conceptual vision of The Bentway consists of a 1.75 kilometres (1.09 mi) long multi-use trail between Exhibition GO Station to Spadina Avenue. It hosts activities such as farmer's markets, gardens, performances, ice skating and festivals, spanning three main sections. The Bentway spans six Toronto neighbourhoods with a total of 77,000 residents: Liberty Village, Niagara, Fort York, Fashion District, CityPlace, and Harbourfront.

== Staging Grounds ==
Bentway Staging Grounds, located at Dan Leckie Way and Lake Shore Boulevard, opened in September 2023. To the south of Canoe Landing Park, Bentway Staging Grounds includes a network of ramps and elevated walkways for pedestrians and cyclists. This public infrastructure blends art, public space, experimentation, education and environmental regeneration. Designed by Agency—Agency (New York City) and SHEEEP (Toronto), Bentway Staging Grounds collects and leverages runoff water from the highway into oversized planters in the space below. These planters support the growth of diverse, native plant species. Water filtration and retention helps to reduce the risk of flooding.

== Winter Skating ==
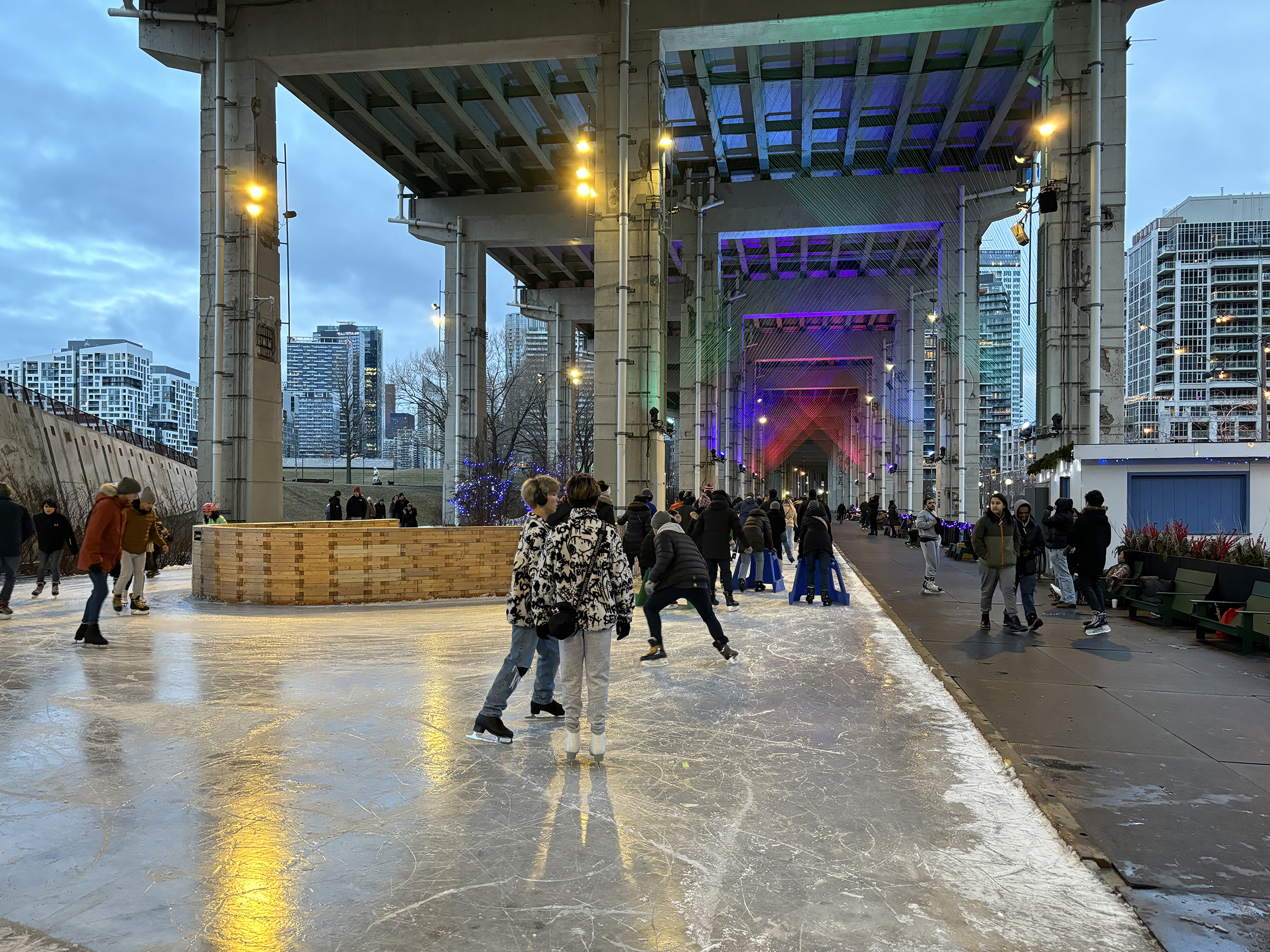
The Bentway is converted into a public ice skating trail during winter

In the winter, part of The Bentway is converted into a public ice skating trail and exhibits public art by local artists. During the 2022-2023 season, Shellie Zhang's installation Beacons was on display. During the 2023-2024 season, Canadian artistic duo Yi Zhou and Carlos Portillo’s installation The Gateway is on display.
