= South Core, Toronto =

South Core Soco
- Neighbourhood
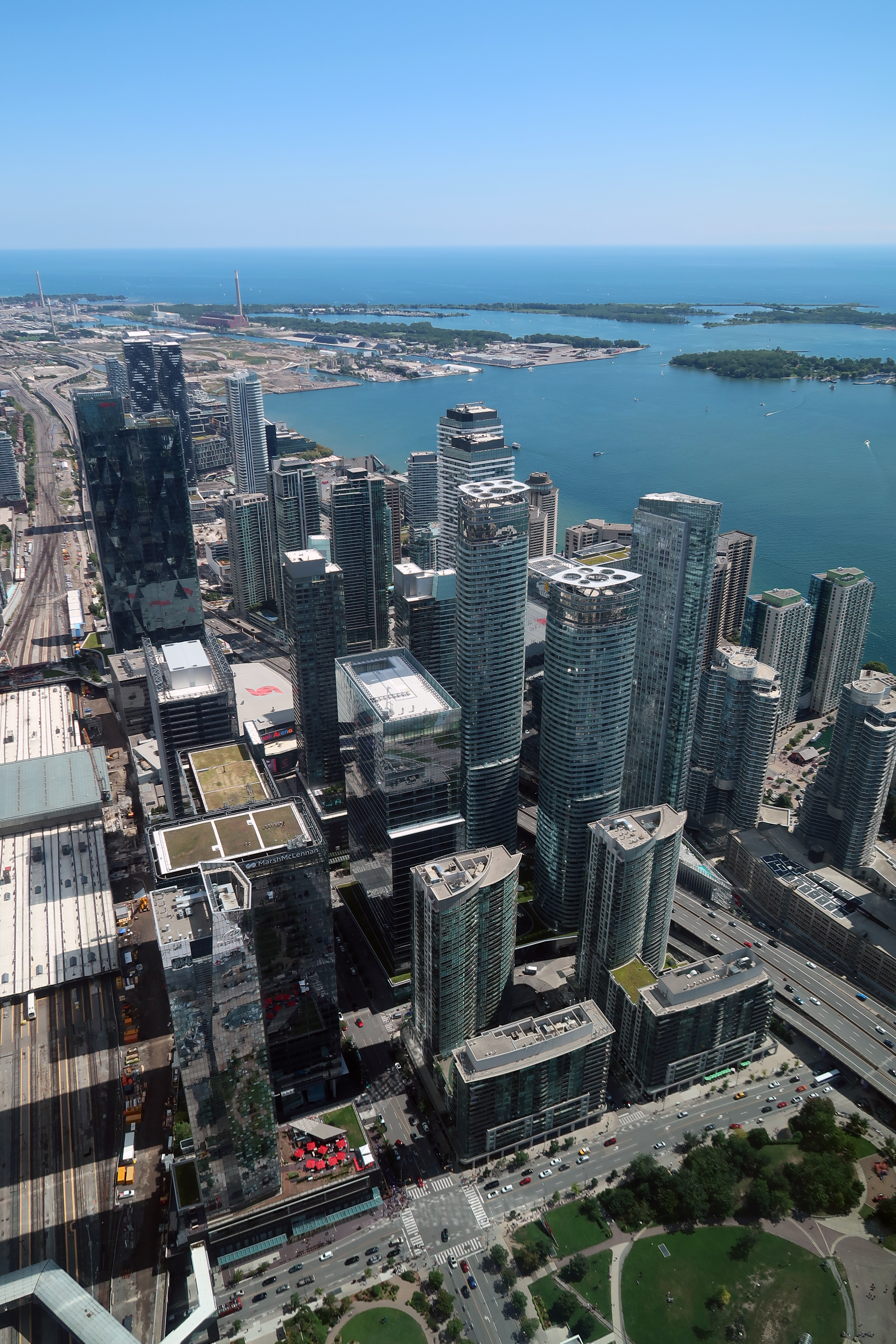
- View of South Core looking east from Bremner Boulevard and Lower Simcoe Street

- Location in Toronto
- Coordinates: 43°38′38″N 79°22′46″W
- Country: Canada
- Province: Ontario
- City: Toronto

South Core is a neighbourhood located in downtown Toronto, Ontario, Canada. The South Core occupies the eastern portions of the Railway Lands. The remodeling and restoration of Union Station and the construction of a new wave of business and condominium towers is central to this area's forecast growth.

Forecasters expect the downtown population to grow 80 per cent to 130,000 by 2031. With the financial district just to the north and the new high-rise South Core on the other side, Union is right at the centre.

Love Park is a new two-acres park in the area formerly site of York-Bay ramps that were removed to make room for the park.

== History ==
The South Core was once part Toronto Harbour and now lies on land fill done from the 1850s to 1920s to accommodate railway lines. From the mid-1950s to the mid-1960s, the Gardiner Expressway was erected, cutting off much of the city from the Toronto waterfront as rings of highways were built around many North American cities as was the trend at the time.

In previous decades, much of the land was unusable due to its designation as rail lands. Today, that stigma is gone as multiple business and condominium towers have risen and more continue to be built. The name South Core derives from south of the downtown (or financial) core of the city.

== Location ==
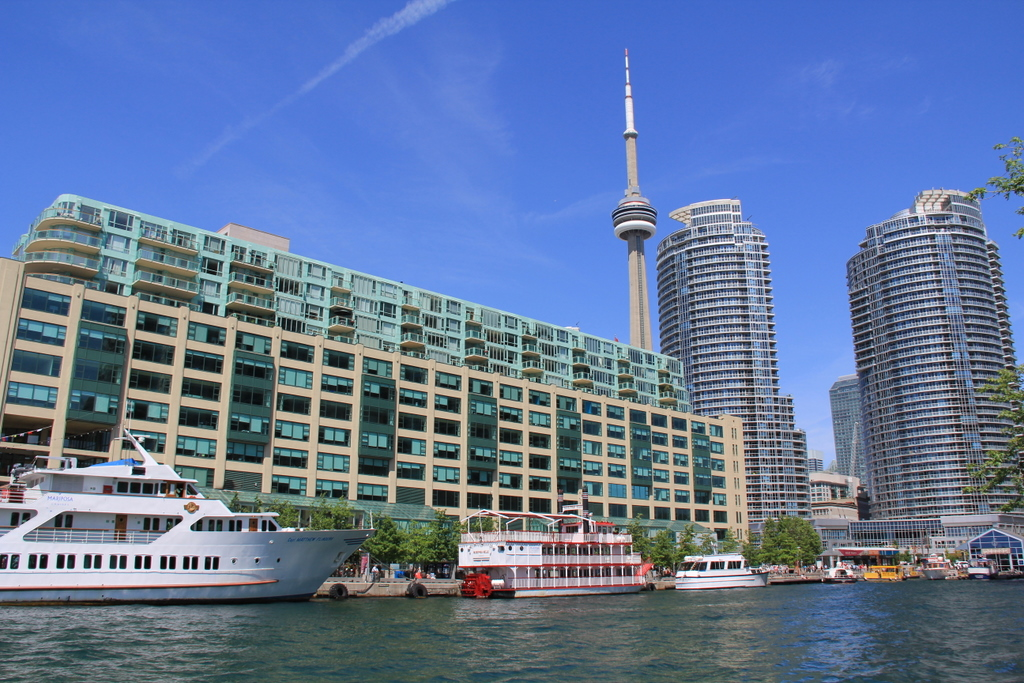
Queen's Quay Terminal from Lake Ontario. The South Core is bounded by Lake Ontario to the south.

The district is bounded on its western side by Lower Simcoe Street, its eastern side by Lower Jarvis Street, its northern side by the railway tracks and southern side by Lake Ontario. Union Station lies within the district as well.

The area is a re-imagining of portions of the Railway Lands and is connected to the city through the extensive PATH network of underground walkways connecting Union Station, Scotiabank Arena and other notable landmarks.

But in the past few years, something remarkable and unexpected has happened. The barrier effect, once considered permanent, has faded away. Development has jumped over the railway tracks to create a teeming new district becoming known as the South Core. Office and condominium towers are nudging right up to the Gardiner, clustering both north and south of Fred Gardiner’s elevated behemoth.

== Amenities and notable buildings ==
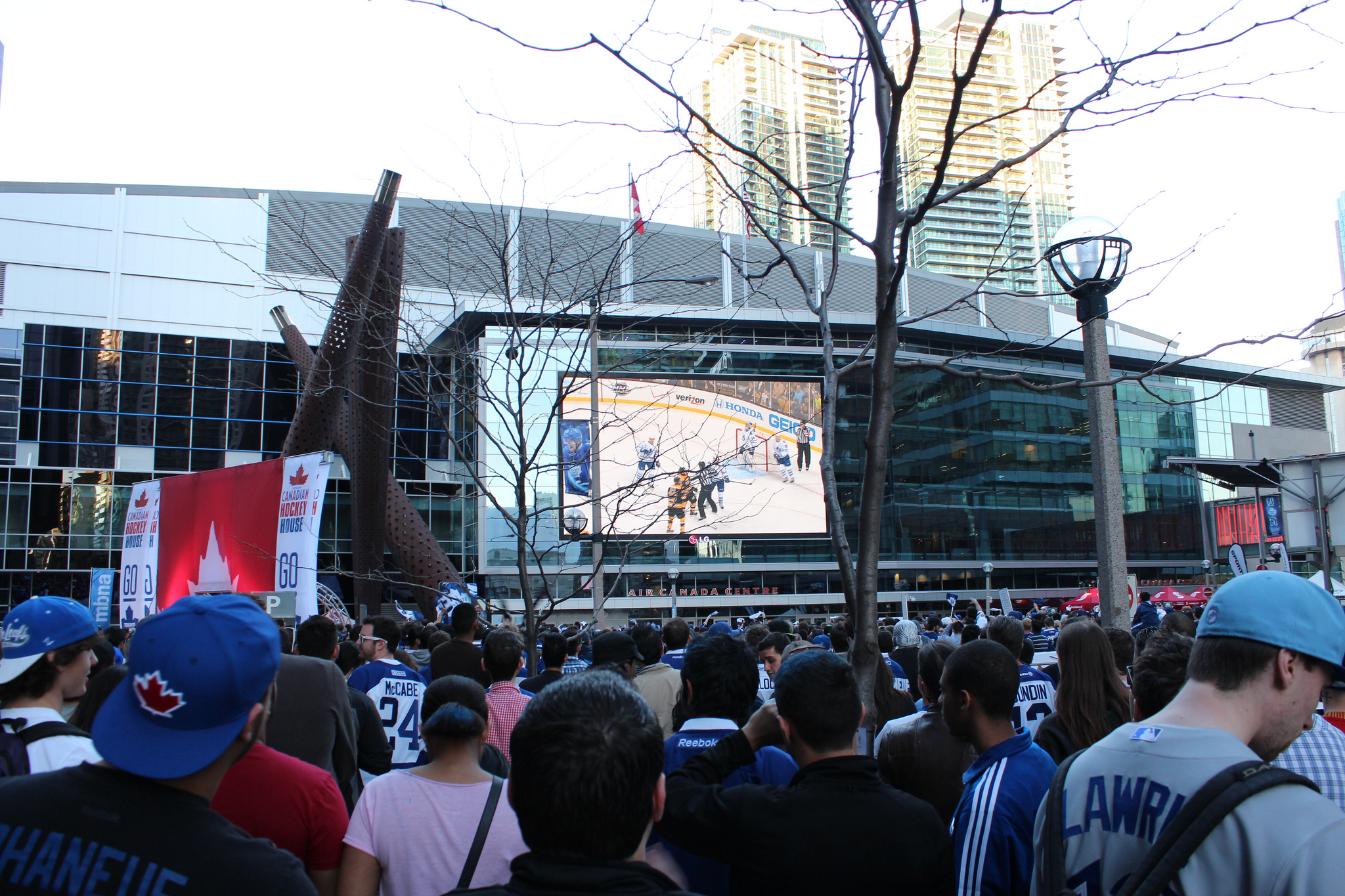
Maple Leaf Square during the 2013 Stanley Cup playoffs. The public square in between Maple Leaf Square tower, Telus Harbour, and Scotiabank Arena.

In October 2013, Delta Hotels announced a new flagship hotel central to South Core.

Maple Leaf Square, a multi-use complex and public square next to Scotiabank Arena, sometimes plays host to live broadcasts of sporting events on the video screen facing Bremner Boulevard. Real Sports Bar & Grill, one of North America's largest sports bars, is located inside Maple Leaf Square.

Telus Harbour, PwC Tower and CIBC Square are prominent office towers in the district.

Harbour Plaza is a new condominium project being built at York Street and was supposed to have Target Canada as the major tenant, but Target has pulled out of the Canadian market, leaving the space without a tenant.

Sugar Wharf is a mixed use development under construction.

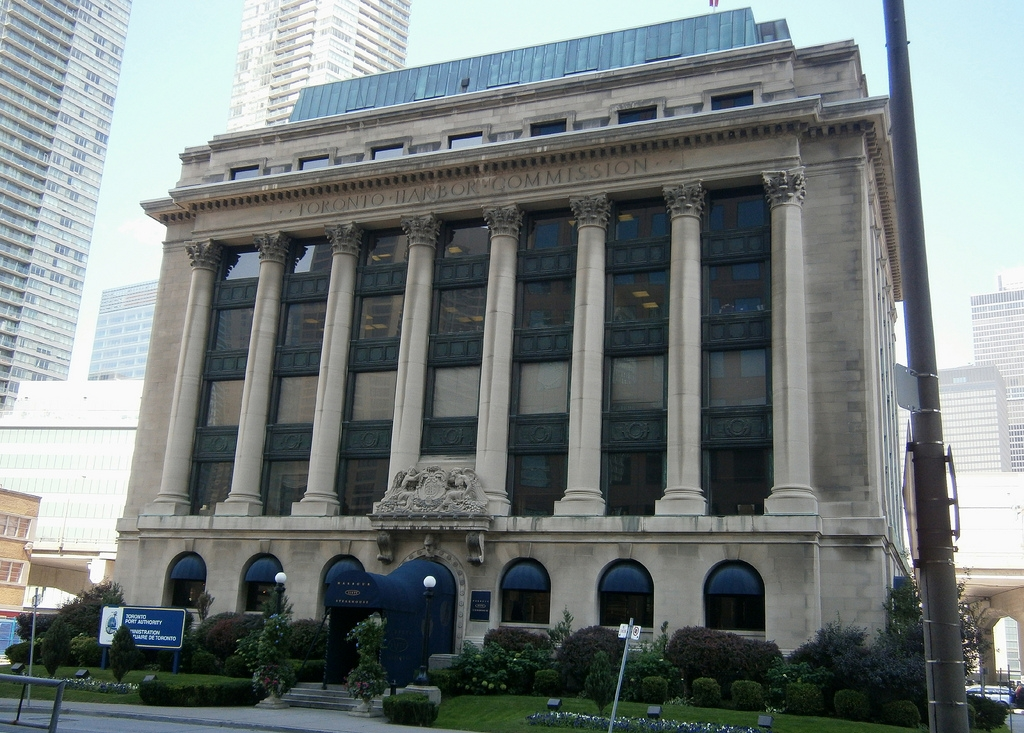
Erected in 1917, the Toronto Harbour Commission Building is the home of PortsToronto, an agency responsible for the management of the Toronto Harbour.

Other notable buildings in the area include:

- Loblaws supermarket and LCBO headquarters are located on the east end of SoCo.
- Queen's Quay Terminal
- The Power Plant Contemporary Art Gallery
- Jack Layton Ferry Terminal
- Redpath Sugar Refinery and Sugar Museum
- Toronto Star Building
- Harbour Castle Westin Hotel
- Toronto Harbour Commission Building (THC)
- Toronto Transportation Commission's Harbour Yard located on the south side of Lake Shore Boulevard from Bay to York Streets was used to store streetcars from 1951 to 1954. It is now the site of Waterpark Place office towers and parking lot.
- Ten York

== Travel and transit ==
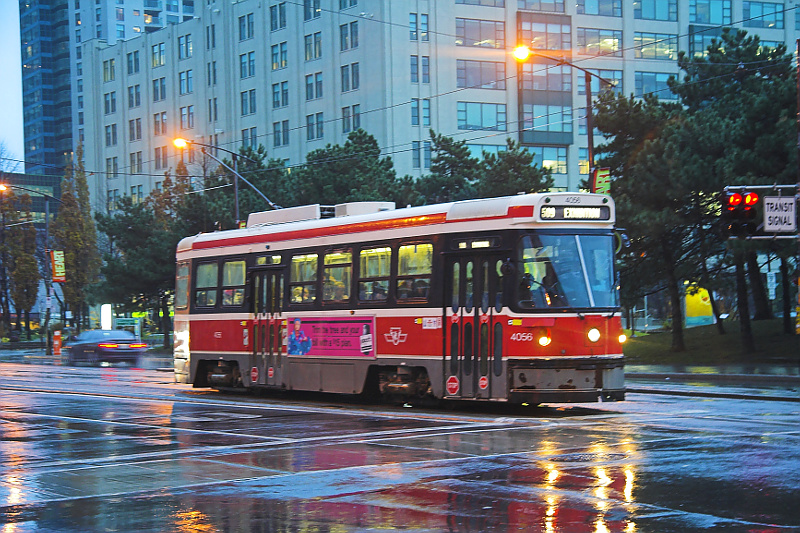
A 509 Harbourfront streetcar near Queen's Quay Terminal. 509 Harbourfront is a streetcar line that operates in the area.

The PATH network connects to the Toronto Waterfront Trail through 85 Harbour Street (also known as Waterpark Place III)

Union Station is Canada's busiest railway station and, with nearly 200,000 passengers per day, is the second busiest station in North America, behind New York City's Penn Station.

The Metrolinx Union Pearson Express provides transportation between Toronto Pearson airport and Union Station by rail.

Union Station Bus Terminal is also located within the South Core and provides transit connections from the area to the rest of the Greater Toronto Area.

== See also ==
- Financial District, Toronto
- Southcore Financial Centre
