= Maple Leaf Square =

Mixed-use development in Toronto, Canada

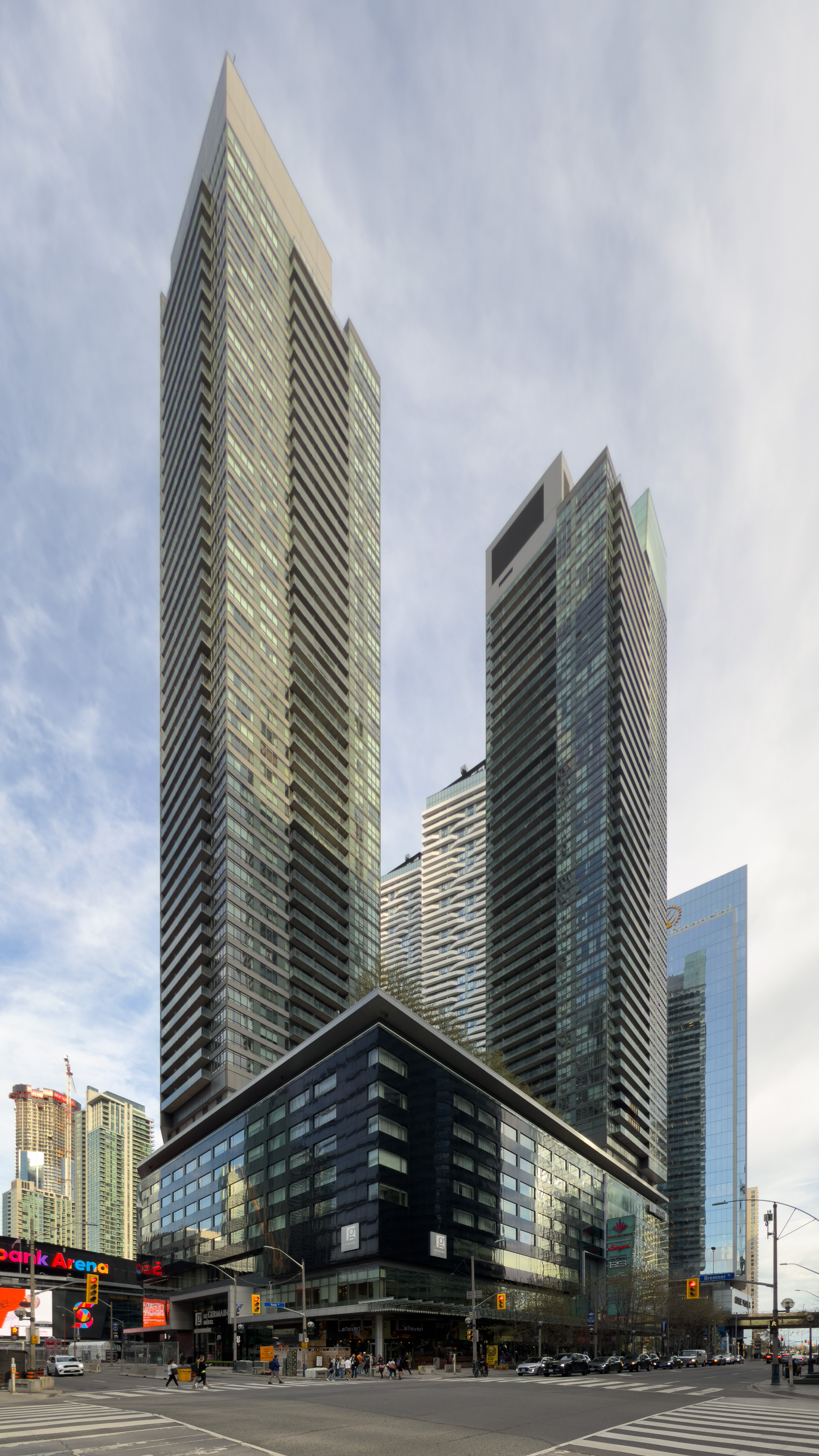
- Maple Leaf Square

- Location within Toronto

General information
- Status: Completed
- Type: Public square, Hotel, Condominium, Office, Retail
- Location: 15 York St., Toronto, Ontario, Canada
- Coordinates: 43°38′33″N 79°22′49″W
- Construction started: January 2007
- Completed: 2010

Height
- Roof: 186 m (610 ft)

Technical details
- Floor count: 54 (topped out)
- Floor area: 1,800,000 sq ft (170,000 m^{2})
- Grounds: 2.1 acres (0.85 ha)

Design and construction
- Architects: Kuwabara Payne McKenna Blumberg Architects with Page & Steele Architects (Architect of Record)
- Main contractor: PCL Construction

Other information
- Number of units: 872

Website
- www.cadillacfairview.com/maple-leaf-square/

Maple Leaf Square is a multi-use complex and public square located in the South Core neighbourhood of Toronto, Ontario, Canada. It is located to the west of the Scotiabank Arena on the former Railway Lands. The $500 million development was jointly developed by Cadillac Fairview, Lanterra and Maple Leaf Sports & Entertainment (MLSE), who own the nearby Scotiabank Arena. The complex has 1,800,000 square feet (170,000 m^{2}) of usable space covering 2.1 acres (0.85 ha) on one city block.

== Name ==
Maple Leaf Square is named after Maple Leaf Sports & Entertainment, which owns the Toronto Maple Leafs and Toronto Raptors, both of which play in Scotiabank Arena next to the square. During the 2014 postseason for the Raptors, the public square became a popular gathering area to view playoff games, and was nicknamed by fans as Jurassic Park, in reference to the film from which the Raptors team name originated. The square is now colloquially referred to as Jurassic Park by the fans and media in addition to the real name, the Raptors Tailgate.

On September 25, 2014, it was reported that the official name of the square would be changed to Ford Square from Maple Leaf Square, after the Ford Motor Company of Canada's purchase of naming rights to the square. After public uproar to the rename, five days later, MLSE said that those reports were "premature and unfounded" and that they would not get rid of the name. Instead, they announced that the square would be rebranded as the Ford Fan Zone at Maple Leaf Square due to a five-year sponsorship deal with Ford Canada.

== History ==
Construction on the project began in January 2007.

The two glass and cast-in-place concrete towers are 65 storeys, containing 872 residential units, a 167-room Hotel LeGermain Boutique Hotel, 230,000 square feet (21,000 m^{2}) of office space, 110,000 square feet (10,000 m^{2}) of retail space, a 7,000-square-foot (650 m^{2}) daycare centre, a high-definition theatre that broadcasts Leafs Nation Network and NBA TV Canada 24-hours a day, and four levels of underground parking with nearly 900 spaces.

The retail complex includes a Longo's grocery, a 24,000-square-foot (2,200 m^{2}) sports bar called Real Sports Bar and Grill, a sports retail store called Real Sports Apparel, a fine dining restaurant called E11even, a fan apparel specific location of Sportchek and a branch of the Toronto Dominion Bank. For residents, there is a rooftop garden and swimming pool. The development was designed to achieve LEED (Leadership in Energy and Environmental Design) Silver status for the project's environmental sustainability.

The building partly served as inspiration for LECOM Harborcenter, a multi-use building built near KeyBank Center in Buffalo, New York by Buffalo Sabres and Buffalo Bills owner Terrence Pegula's Pegula Sports and Entertainment. The similarity is most noticeable in the design of the restaurant: LECOM Harborcenter's 716 Food and Sport was largely based on Maple Leaf Square's Real Sports Bar and Grill.

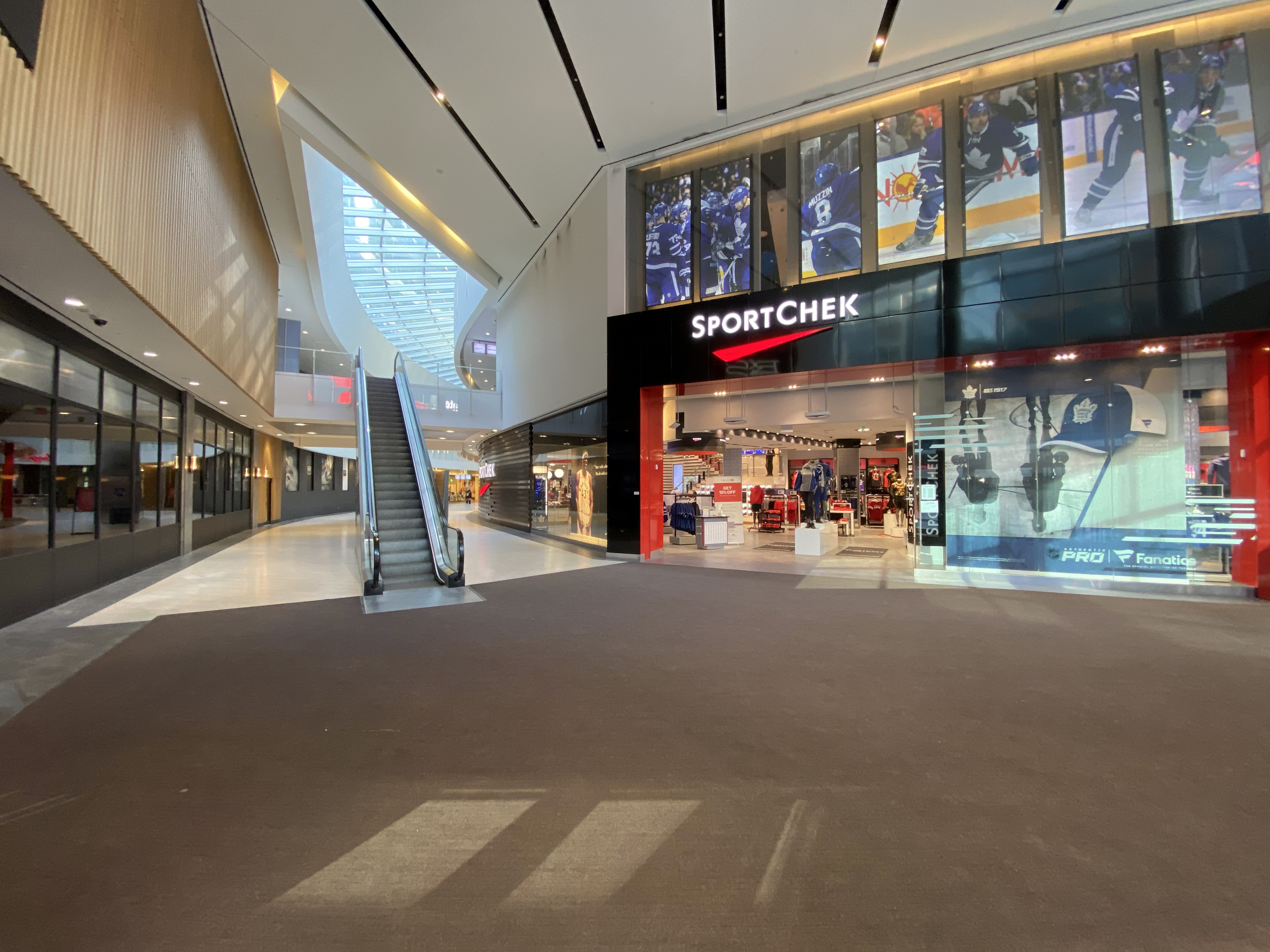
Retail complex

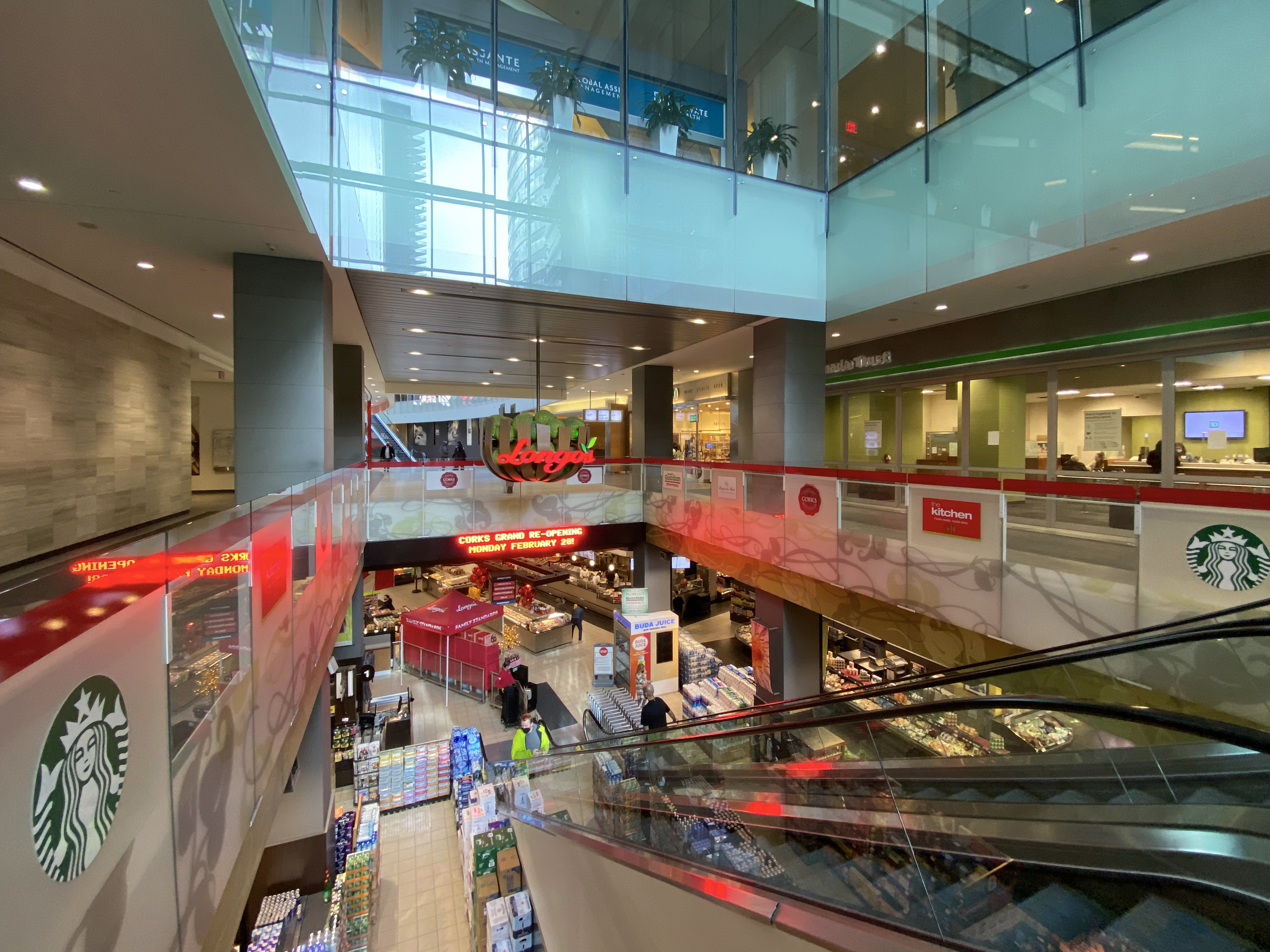
Longo's Supermarket

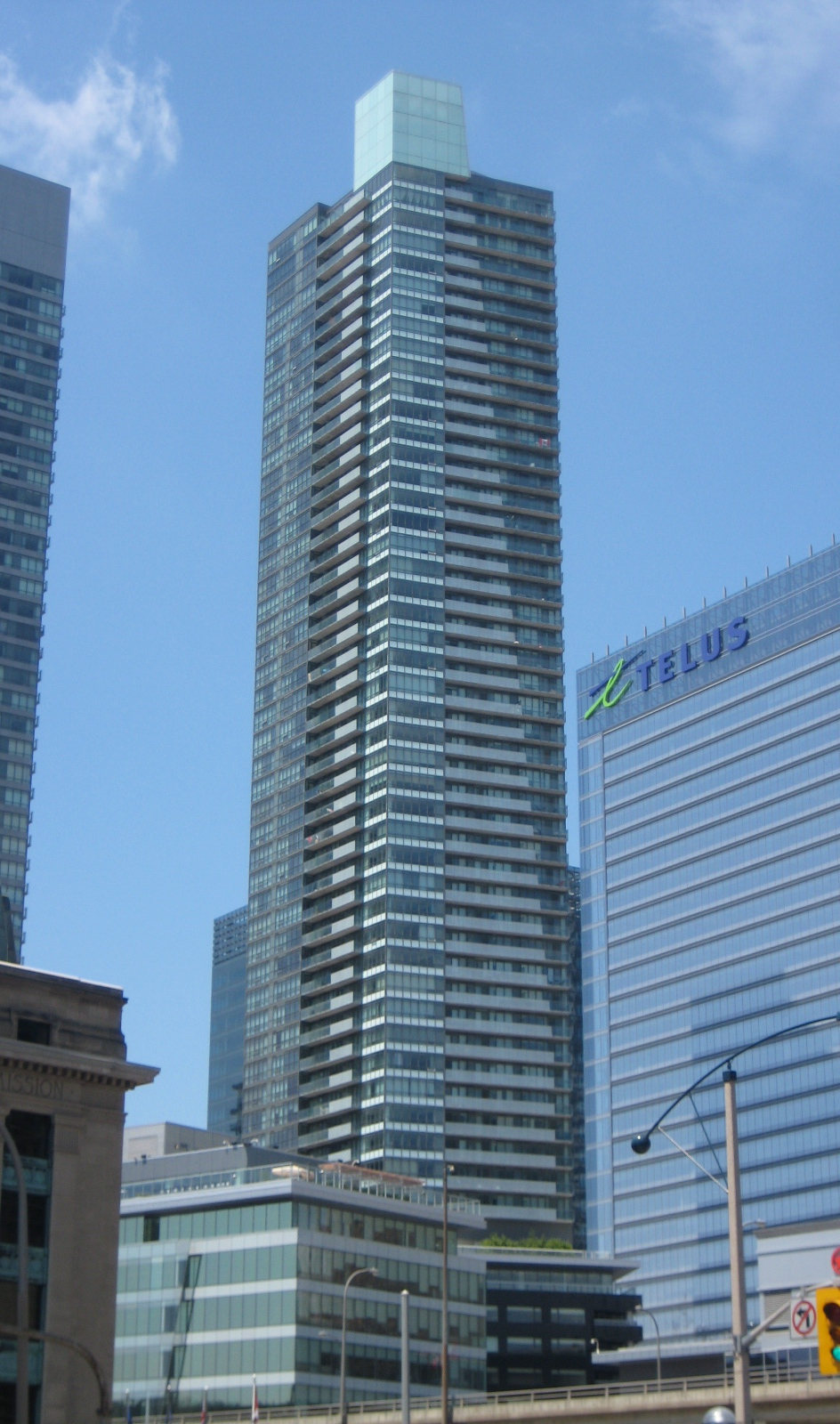
North Tower

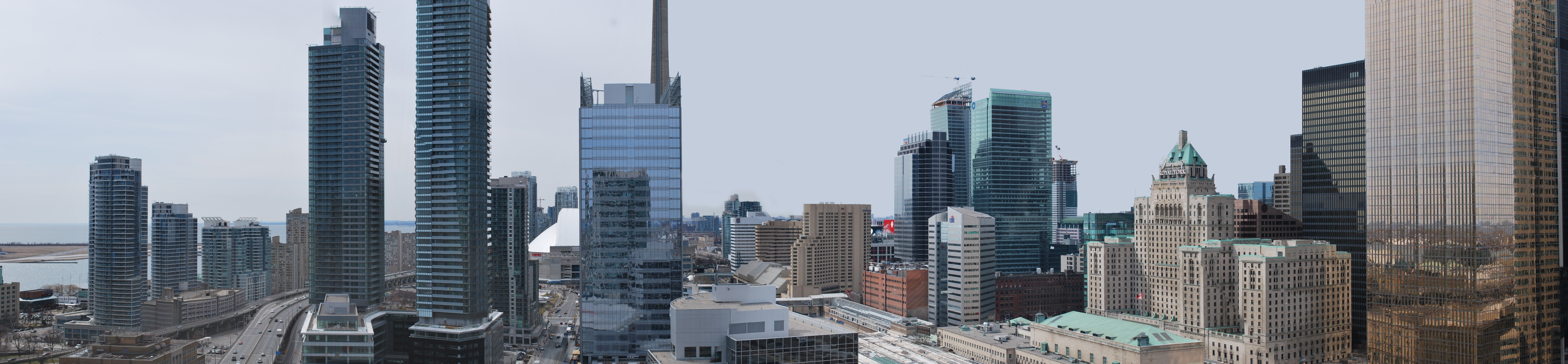
Maple Leaf Square topped out in Spring 2010

== Public square ==
Maple Leaf Square
- Public square
- Jurassic Park
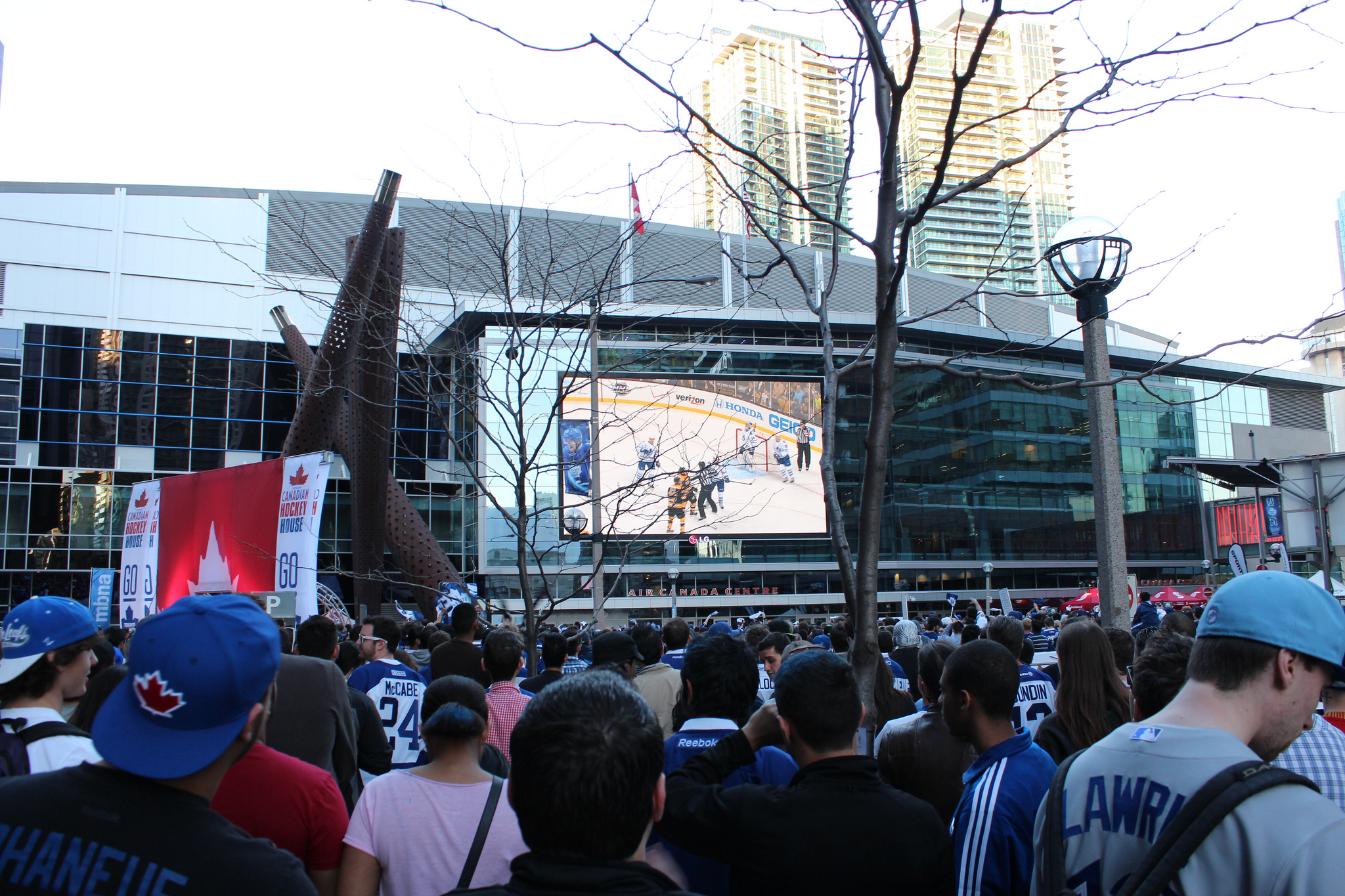
- Fans watching the Toronto Maple Leafs play the Boston Bruins in the 2013 Stanley Cup playoffs
- Features: Video screens
- Opened: 2010
- Owner: City of Toronto
- Location: Toronto, Ontario, Canada
- Location of Maple Leaf Square in Toronto
- Coordinates: 43°38′35.5″N 79°22′49.4″W

The public square has a capacity of 5,000 people. It hosts pre-game gatherings and other sports-related events.

In conjunction with the project, the Scotiabank Arena itself on the side of Maple Leaf Square was renovated. The renovations included a 20,000-square-foot (1,900 m^{2}) atrium addition to the west side of the arena which abuts the plaza. The outside wall of the atrium features a 50 by 80-foot (24 m) video screen overlooking the plaza which was inspired by similar plazas at L.A. Live in Los Angeles, and Victory Park in Dallas. Games going on inside the arena are often displayed live on the outdoor screen.

The square was the first such plaza in Canada. It has been since emulated in Edmonton with a plaza in the Ice District by Daryl Katz, owner of the Edmonton Oilers and in Winnipeg with True North Square by True North Sports and Entertainment, owners of the Winnipeg Jets.

=== Viewing space for sports ===
The public square holds special outdoor viewings of significant games like home openers and playoff games for both the Toronto Maple Leafs and Toronto Raptors on a giant video screen affixed above the west entrance of Scotiabank Arena. Maple Leaf Sports & Entertainment, which owns both franchises, puts concession and merchandise stands on the square during such occasions. These viewings happen regardless of whether the team is playing at home or on the road. Popularity of this fan experience has risen over the years and has required heightened security and traffic control. Interest in attendance reached a new level on May 25, 2019, to watch the Raptors win Game 6 of the Eastern Conference Finals to advance to the NBA Finals for the first time. Following the Raptors' historic win in the 2019 NBA Finals, the City of Toronto renamed as Raptors Way a portion of Bremner Boulevard from York Street to Lake Shore Boulevard.

== See also ==
- South Core, Toronto
- List of tallest buildings in Canada
- List of tallest buildings in Toronto
