= Southcore Financial Centre =

Coordinates: 43.64296°N 79.38310°W

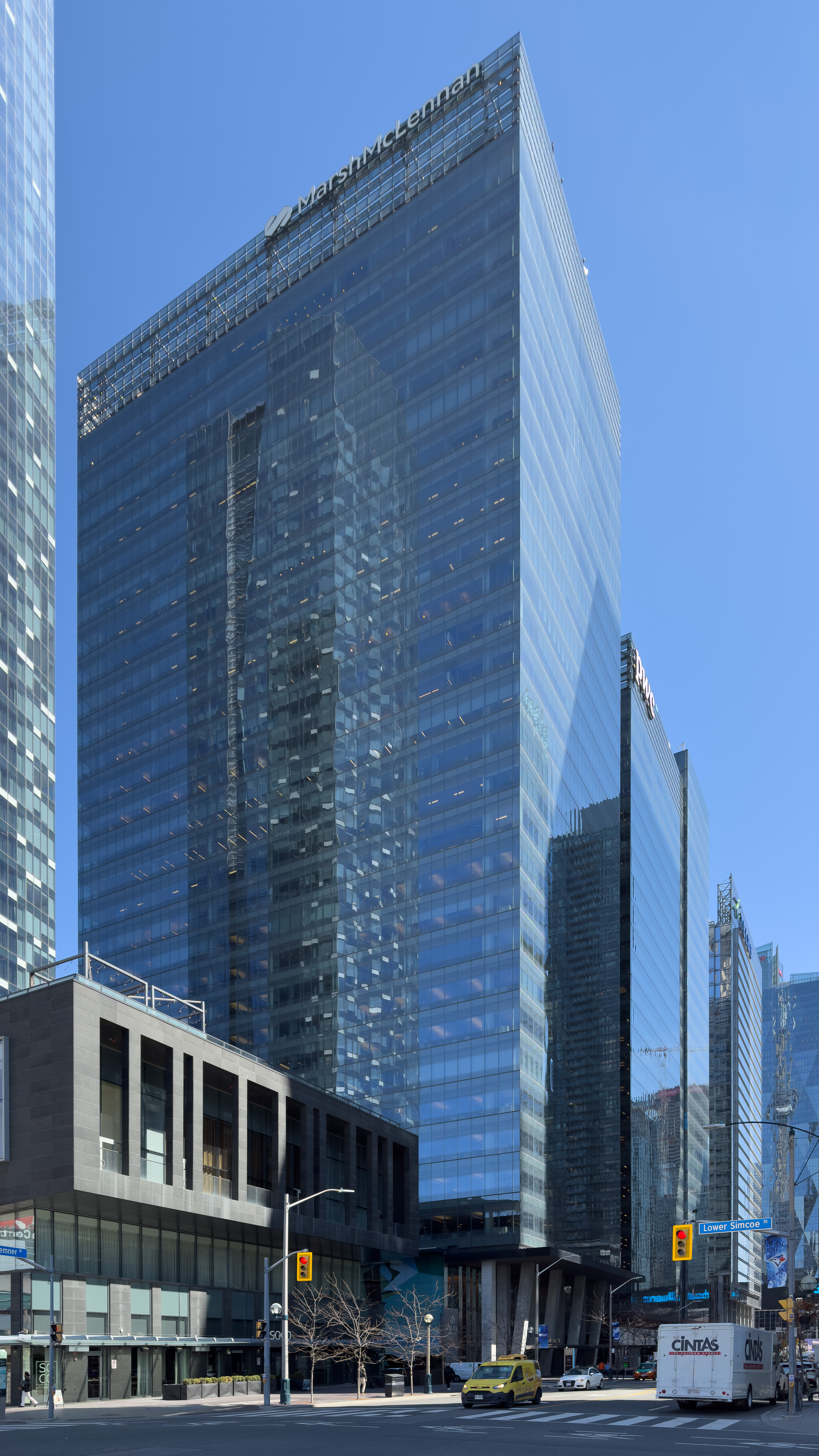
- Interactive map of the Southcore Financial Centre area

General information
- Location: 120 Bremner Blvd, Toronto, Canada

The Southcore Financial Centre (SFC) is a building located in 120 Bremner Blvd, Downtown Toronto, Ontario, Canada. The building is central to the redevelopment of the area in a new neighborhood known simply as South Core. The SFC is composed of two towers (PwC Tower and Bremner Tower) totaling 1.4 million square feet. The building is managed by QuadReal Property Group and is connected to Union Station, Go Train, UP Express, the Metro Toronto Convention Centre, Rogers Centre, and Scotiabank Arena.

In October 2013, Delta Hotels announced a new flagship hotel central to South Core.

== See also ==
- South Core, Toronto
- PATH (Toronto)
