= CityPlace, Toronto =

Neighbourhood in Ontario, Canada

CityPlace
- Neighbourhood
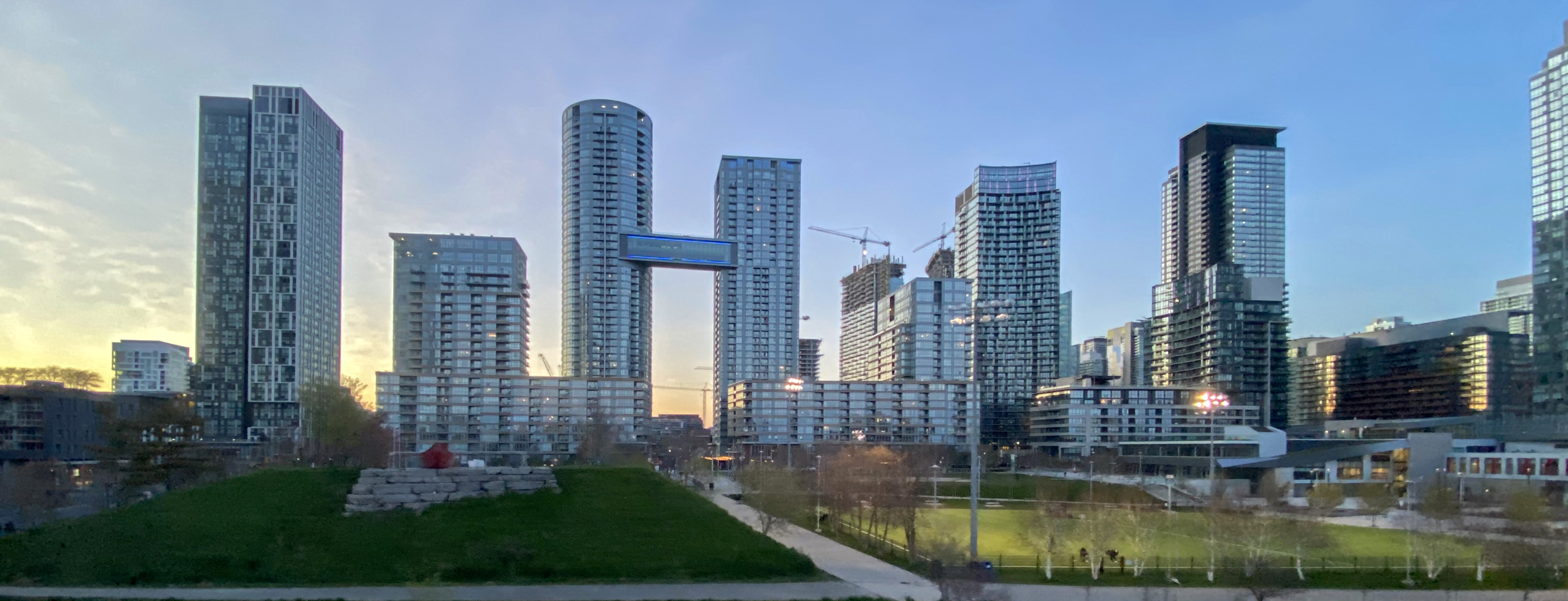
- View of western CityPlace (2022)

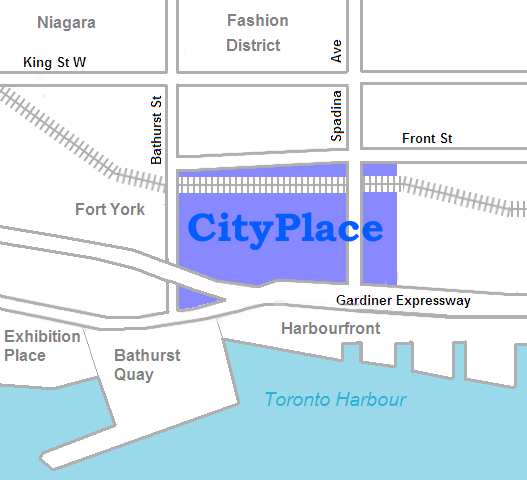
- Vicinity

- Location within Toronto
- Coordinates: 43.640044°N 79.395179°W
- Country: Canada
- Province: Ontario
- City: Toronto

Government
  - MP: Chi Nguyen (Spadina—Harbourfront)
  - MPP: Chris Glover (Spadina—Fort York)
  - Councillor: Ausma Malik (Ward 10 Spadina—Fort York)

CityPlace is a neighbourhood in downtown Toronto, Ontario, Canada, within the former Railway Lands. When completed, this area will be the largest residential development ever created in Toronto. The area is bordered by Bathurst Street to the west, Lake Shore Boulevard to the south, and Front Street to the north and Blue Jays Way and Rogers Centre to the east. Cityplace is also a five-to-ten-minute walk from King Street West and Liberty Village and a ten-to-twenty-minute walk from Toronto's financial district. The neighbourhood is also home to the Canoe Landing Park, designed by famed Canadian writer and artist Douglas Coupland.

== History ==
=== Early history ===
What is now CityPlace was originally conceived as a way to revitalize what was Canadian National's former Spadina Street Yard Facility, which was part of the extensive Railway Lands in the waterfront area.

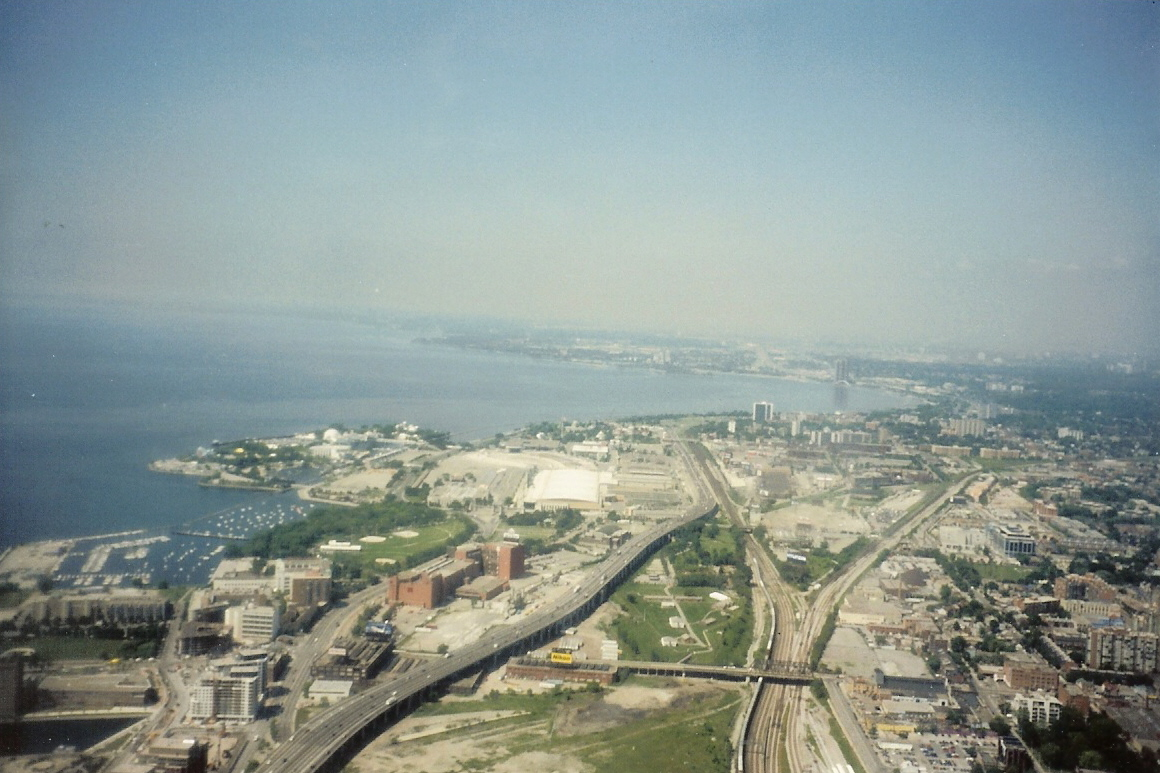
Railway Lands west of the CN Tower in 1999, shortly before new developments transformed the area into CityPlace in the early 21st century.

Going as far back as 1965, when CN began to shift the functions of many of its yards in the Greater Toronto Area to a centralized facility in the northern suburb of Vaughan, there had been plans to revitalize this part of downtown. One of them called for the construction of a large television/telecommunications tower as a showcase of Canadian industry, which was realized in the 1970s with the CN Tower in addition to the massive Metro Centre which was later cancelled. Further development took place in the 1980s, with the 1984 completion of the Metro Toronto Convention Centre drawing new attention to the area.

With the arrival of new visitors and development of new commercial draws, a fresh master plan was drawn up by the City of Toronto for revitalization of this area. At the same time Via Rail, the sole remaining occupant of the Spadina Street Yards, relocated their local operations to the newly built Toronto Maintenance Centre in New Toronto, freeing up the lands necessary for the planned revitalization. Work commenced after the demolition of the last railway buildings with the construction of SkyDome, which was completed in 1989.

At the same time, a new network of roads, parks and infrastructure began to take shape. The project proceeded smoothly until an economic downturn caused many of the development plans to be shelved, and much land stood abandoned until 1997 when construction of the Air Canada Centre arena commenced.

=== Redevelopment ===
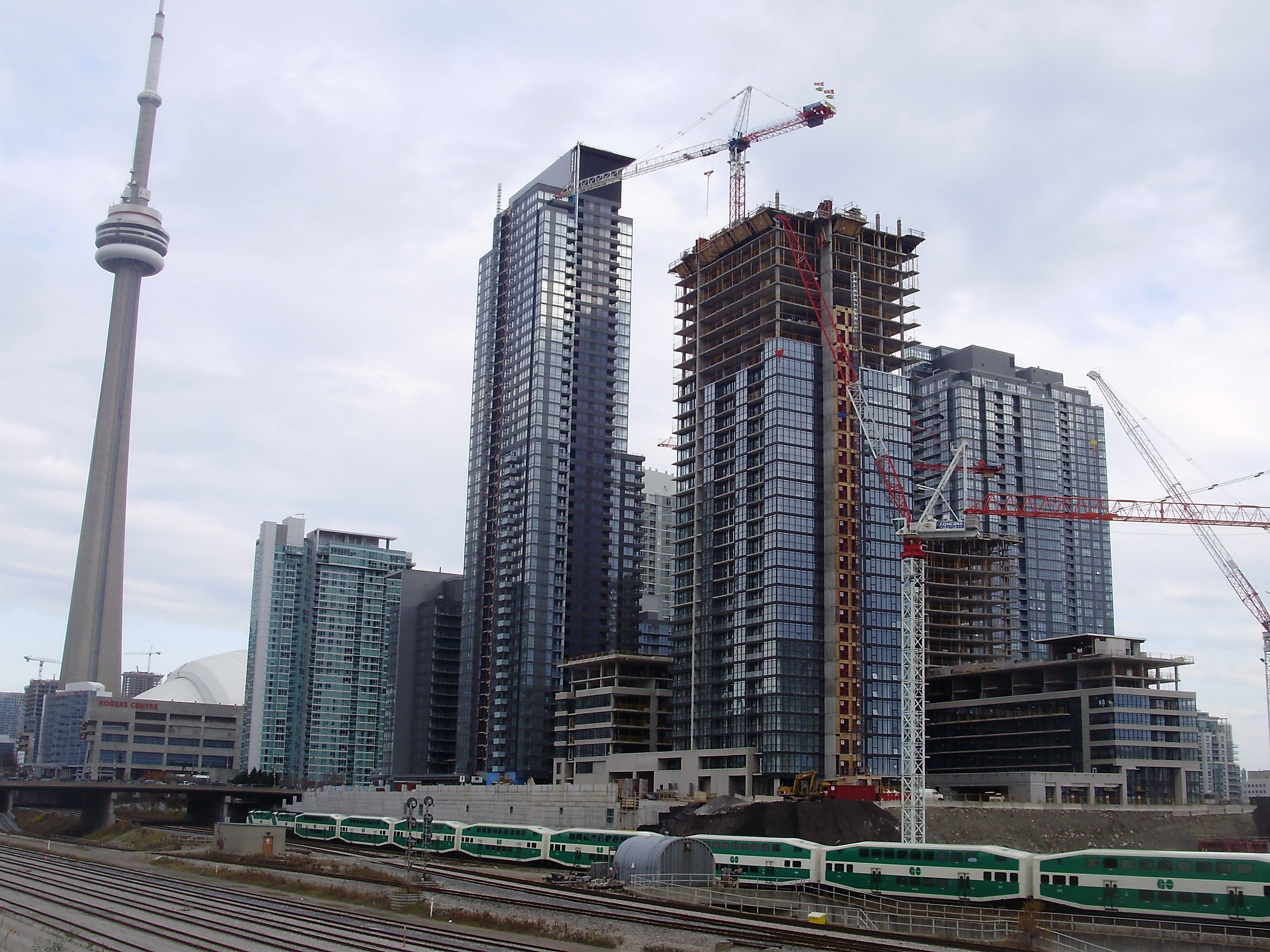
Construction in CityPlace in 2008, looking south from the Union Station Rail Corridor. CityPlace reached its final phase of redevelopment in the early 21st century.

This began the third and final phase of redevelopment called CityPlace which called for a multipurpose development of commercial, residential, and retail along the western section of the Railway Lands. The current CityPlace development was conceived by Concord Adex Developments, the same company that helped revitalize a large section of former Expo 86 lands in Vancouver, who purchased the land in 1997 from the Canada Lands Company.

The final portion of CityPlace to be developed is Block 31. Initially, the proposal for Block 31 included a 42-storey mixed-use tower (alongside schools and community centre). It was criticized for the shadows it would cast over nearby amenity spaces and the site's adjoining Canoe Landing Park, as well as the views it would partially obstruct.

Following a round of public consultations in early 2015, the new schematic design for Block 31 was revealed. It will include two schools and a new community centre. Toronto District School Board (TDSB) and the Toronto Catholic District School Board (TCDSB) have both been designated to use the new space. The shared school building will seek to maximize spatial efficiency, with a common gym and theatre complex for both schools. Block 31's design attempts to maximize available green space. With an articulated green roof spanning the complex's footprint. The 150,000 square foot complex is expected to cost $55 million to construct, and is set to be completed by 2019. The schools are Jean Lumb Public School, named after Jean B. Lumb, the first Chinese Canadian woman and the first restaurateur to receive the Order of Canada for her community work; and Bishop MacDonell Catholic School, which is named after Alexander Macdonell, the first bishop of Kingston in Upper Canada

==== Project scope ====
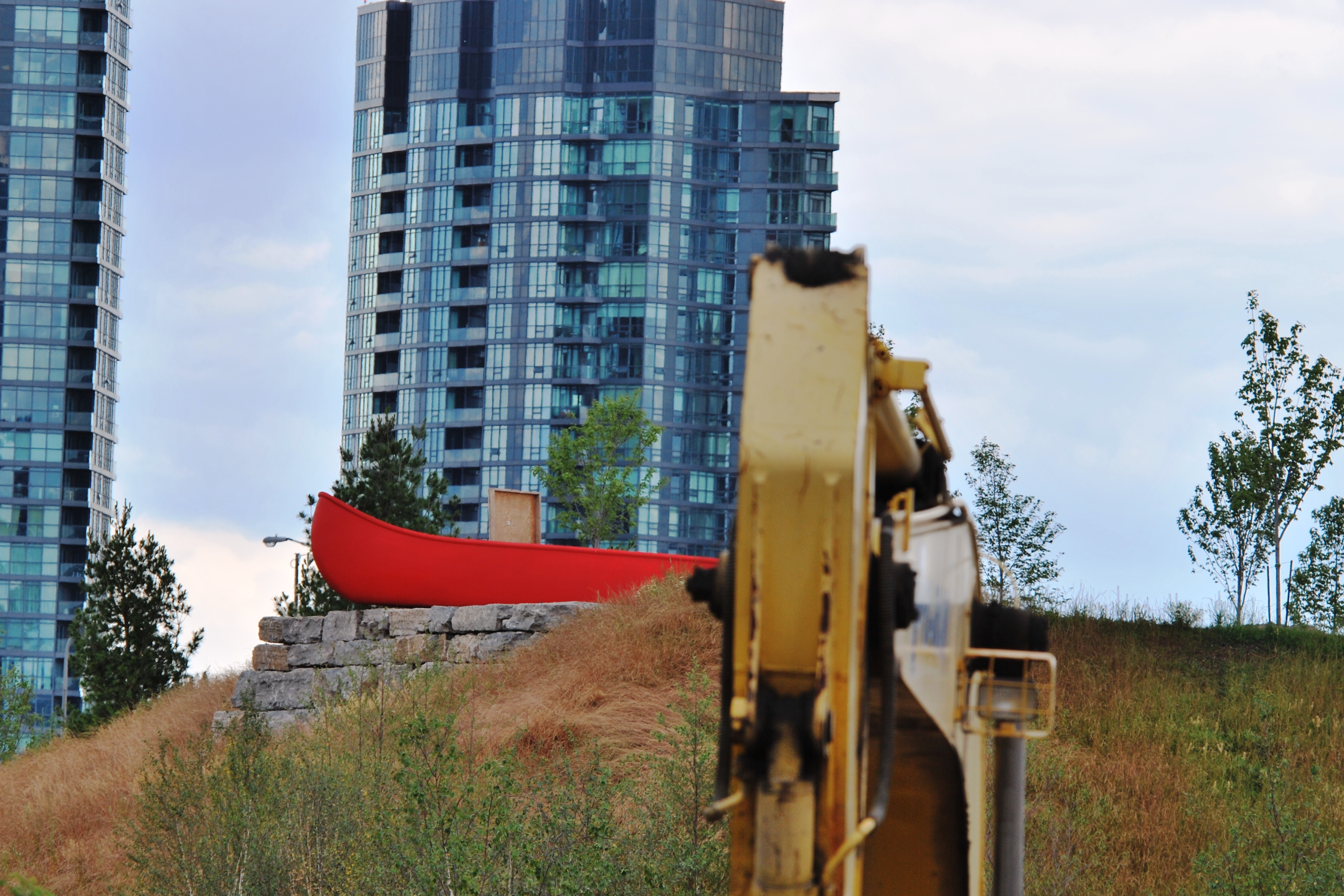
Canoe Landing Park is a 3.24 hectares (8.0 acres) park in CityPlace.

- Project size: 18 hectares (44 acres) including an 8-hectare (20-acre) community park. 7500 residential units upon completion.
- Residential development is divided into 10 street blocks, numbered from 1 to 10. Each street block contains a number of residential towers with its own sets of common facilities.
- Block 1 was developed first with 4 towers, namely Matrix A/B (Completed 2002) and Apex C/D (Completed 2003), all with Front Street West addresses. The street block features buildings directly facing the entertainment district and the closest walk to the Financial District.
- Block 2 features 1 building (Optima) only, directly behind the Rogers Centre, fronting on Navy Wharf Court. It features a heightened privacy comparing to the other interconnected towers. Completed 2003.
- Block 3 is the largest street block in the entire CityPlace complex, with 4 towers and a mid-rise building, as well as townhouses to decrease the tension of high density development. The project was named Harbour View Estates and was completed in 2006.
- Block 4 features 2 towers and a mid-rise, mirroring the Harbour View Estates both in location and in design. The buildings are named as WestOne, N1/N2 and The Gallery, was completed by October 2007.
- Block 5 contains one tower (Montage), completed in early 2009, and a mid-rise building (Neo), completed in late 2008.
- Block 6 has further progressed in design as trend evolves, with 2 towers and 1 mid-rise, Luna and Luna Vista. Completed April 2010
- Block 7-8 (Parade) Two towers with a 2-story bridge at floors 28 and 29, 2 podium buildings and 2 mid-rise buildings. Completed 2013.
- Block 9 contains the 3.24 hectares (8.0 acres) Canoe Landing Park
- Block 10 will contain the Panorama building with a 7-story podium/mid-rise and a luxury high rise. The high-rise will feature a number of 1500+sqft units with private elevators. Completed April 2010.
- Number of Units: over 5,000 residential units to date.

== Notable landmarks ==
Rank	Name	Height	Floors	Started	Completed	Address	Notes	Image
	Apex C^{[A]}	273 ft (83.2 m)	28	2001	2003	381 Front Street West		
	Apex D^{[A]}	371 ft (113.1 m)*	36	2001	2003	397 Front Street West		
	Concord Canada House A^{[A]}		59	2018 October	2025	23 Spadina Avenue	Tallest complex in CityPlace	
	Concord Canada House B^{[A]}	761 ft (232.0 m)	74	2018 October	2025	23 Spadina Avenue	Tallest complex in CityPlace	
	Exchange^{[A]}		8		2018	90 Queens Wharf Road		
	Forward^{[A]}		30		2018	70 Queens Wharf Road		
	Gallery^{[A]}	108.3 ft (33.0 m)	8	2005 September	2007 July	15 Brunel Court		
	Harbourview Estates A ^{[A]}	402 ft (122.5 m)	40	2003 January	2005	10 Navy Wharf Court		
	Harbourview Estates B^{[A]}	503 ft (153.3 m)	49	2003 January	2005	35 Mariner Terrace		
	Harbourview Estates C^{[A]}	278 ft (84.7 m)*	26	2004	2005	3 Navy Wharf Court		
	Harbourview Estates D^{[A]}	378 ft (115.2 m)*	36	2004	2005	5 Mariner Terrace		
	Harbourview Estates Loft^{[A]}	85.3 ft (26.0 m)*	8	2004	2005	9 Spadina Avenue		
	Luna^{[A]}	229.7 ft (70.0 m)	22	2007 January	2010 April	8 Telegram Mews		
	Luna Vista^{[A]}	413 ft (125.9 m)	38	2007 January	2010 April	25 Capreol Court		
	Matrix A^{[A]}	320 ft (97.5 m)	32	2000	2002	361 Front Street West		
	Matrix B^{[A]}	274 ft (83.5 m)	28	2000	2002	373 Front Street West		
	Montage^{[A]}	476 ft (145.1 m)	47	2006 November	2009 February	25 Telegram Mews		
	N^{[A]}	425 ft (129.5 m)*	41	2005 June	2007 August	15 Fort York Boulevard		
	Neo^{[A]}	210 ft (64.0 m)	16	2006 June	2008 October	4K Spadina Avenue		
	Newton^{[A]}		21		2018	80 Queens Wharf Road		
	Optima^{[A]}	357.6 ft (109.0 m)	34	2001	2003	81 Navy Wharf Court		
	Panorama^{[A]}	315 ft (96.0 m)*	28	2008 January	2010 April	38 Dan Leckie Way		
	Parade 1^{[A]}	366 ft (111.6 m)	39	2008 January	2013	15 Iceboat Terrace / 10 Caperol Court		
	Parade 2^{[A]}	418 ft (127.4 m)	44	2008 January	2012 November	21 Iceboat Terrace / 151 Dan Leckie Way		
	Quartz^{[A]}		41		2015	75 Queens Wharf Road		
	Spectra^{[A]}		39		2015	85 Queens Wharf Road		
	The LakeFront^{[A]}		41		2020	17 Bathurst Street, Toronto		
	The LakeShore^{[A]}		41		2020	19 Bathurst Street, Toronto		
	West One^{[A]}	486 ft (148.1 m)	49	2005	2007 October	11 Brunel Court		
	Jean Lumb Public School (TDSB) Bishop Macdonell Catholic Elementary School (TCDSB)		3	2017 September	2019 September	20 Brunel Court		

(*) – denotes estimate
See Concord Pacific Masterplan in External Links

== Transportation ==
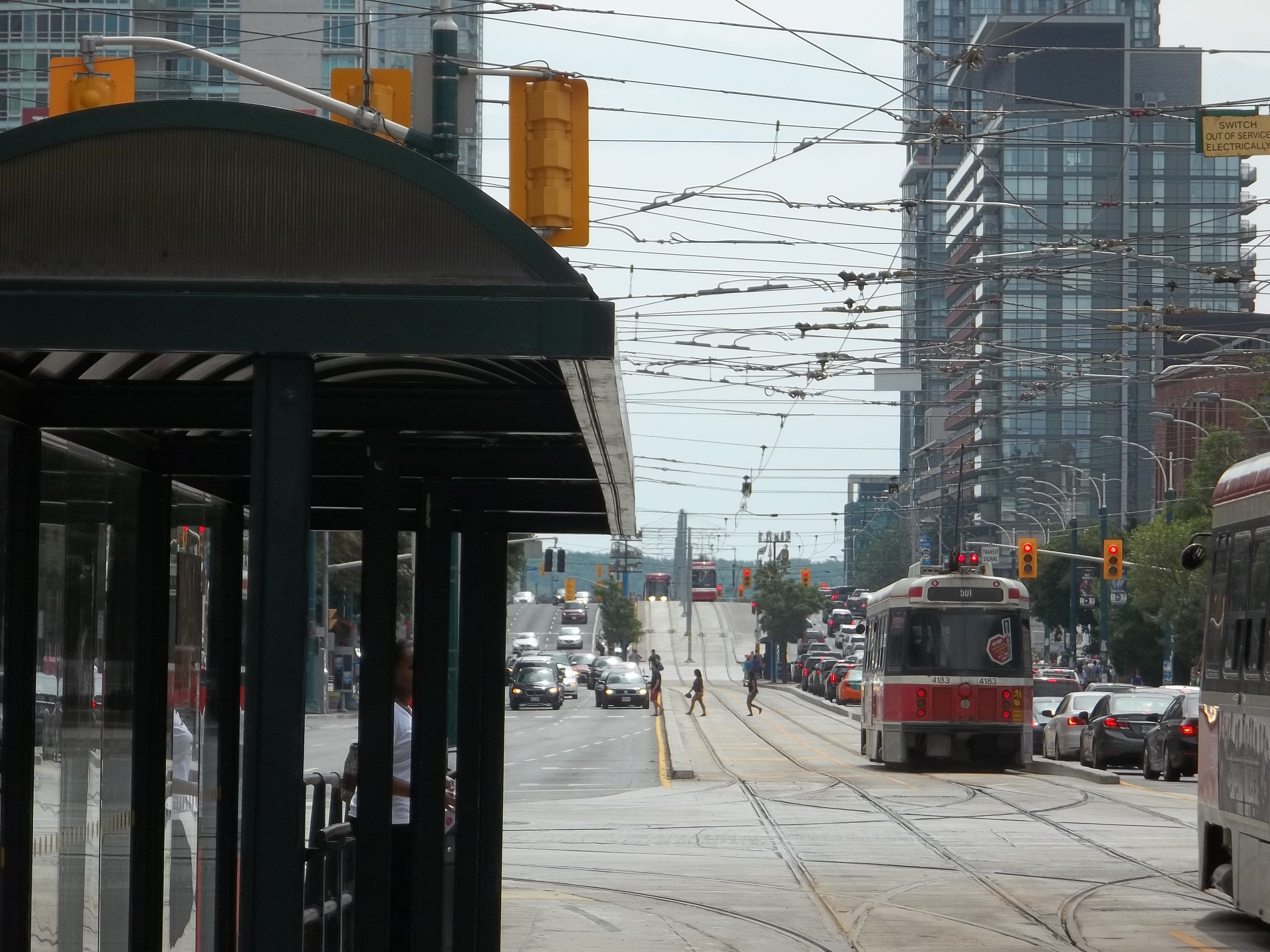
Southbound streetcars from the 510 Spadina line enters CityPlace. The 510 Spadina is one of three streetcar lines that operate in the area.

With its location nestled between the Gardiner Expressway and Union Station, CityPlace is a very accessible area. The development is also serviced by the Toronto Transit Commission's 509 Harbourfront, 510 Spadina, and 511 Bathurst streetcar lines.

In addition, a median is being set aside along Fort York Boulevard, the main thoroughfare through Cityplace, so that it can be used for a streetcar route by the TTC in the future.

A footbridge (Puente de Luz or Bridge of Light) is a pedestrian and cycling crossing from CityPlace to Front Street across the railway tracks was opened in October 2012, but promptly closed due to concerns over the sharpness of clips holding the controversial mesh to the sides of the bridge, as well as concerns over people tripping at joins while using the bridge. Those issues were dealt with, and the bridge reopened in December 2012. The 100m bridge is designed by sculptor Francisco Gazitua of Chile.

== Criticism ==
Some planners, architects and politicians have questioned the prudence of the development's urban design. Critics have lauded the architectural excellence of the buildings themselves, but believe suburban ideals have been engineered into the streetscape. While not opposed to high density, critics cite the project's isolation as a potential hindrance to the future health of the fledgling community. They believe that as with other Toronto high rise developments in the past, CityPlace's lack of interconnectedness with the surrounding city may lead to ghettoization of residents. Others believe community prosperity may be affected by the upward mobility of current purchasers. A lack of large units deters families from choosing CityPlace as a desirable place to live, threatening to recreate the conditions experienced in St. James Town and Regent Park, based on a dated article from 2007. However, as the debate continues, proponents with a more optimistic view towards CityPlace's future have cited developments such as Canoe Landing Park, the rising prestige of the adjacent King West area and other future developments on the horizon in the Toronto Entertainment District as evidence of Cityplace's success.

== See also ==
- Concord Park Place
