= List of cities in Germany with the most skyscrapers =

Frankfurt has the highest number of skyscrapers in Germany.

As of February 2026, Germany has over 20 buildings that stand over 150 meters (492 feet) tall, making it the 5th-tallest country in Europe. Frankfurt has the most skyscrapers in Germany, having 20 out of the 22 buildings (excluding churches) that stand over 150 m (492 ft) tall in Germany, with the other two being located in Bonn and Berlin. Frankfurt is also home to 44 buildings that stand over 100 m (328 ft) tall. As of February 2026, 19 cities in Germany have at least one building that stands over 100 meters tall.

== Cities by the number of skyscrapers ==
The list below ranks cities in Germany that have at least one skyscraper. The height used to define a skyscraper varies depending on source, with some claiming a skyscraper is a building which stands over 150 m (492 ft) in height, while others claim that a skyscraper is a building which stands over 100 m (328 ft) tall. Chimneys, smokestacks, churches, and related structures are not included in this list. Cities without a citation are supported by information in a linked article.

Rank	City	State	Image	Number of buildings		
Rank	City	State	Image	≥100 m (328 ft)	≥150 m (492 ft)	≥200 m (656 ft)
1	Frankfurt am Main	Hesse	Skyline_Frankfurt_Flößerbrücke	44	20	6
2	Berlin	Flag_of_Berlin Berlin	Skyline_Berlin	14	1	0
3	Cologne	North Rhine-Westphalia	Köln_Skyline_an_einem_regnerischem_Tag_2009	9	0	0
4	Munich	Flag_of_Bavaria_(lozengy) Bavaria	Munich_Skyline_from_Deutsche_Museum_(5260149788)	7 (Note: This figure was obtained using the "Skyscraper Diagram" or "Timeline Diagram" function on SkyscraperPage by setting the minimum height to 100 m. Only the "built" and "high-rise buildings" options were selected for structure type and status respectively. SkyscraperPage may include buildings with estimated heights.)	0	0
5	Hamburg	Flag_of_Hamburg Hamburg	Neue_Skyline_Hamburg	5	0	0
6	Mannheim	Flag_of_Baden-Württemberg Baden-Württemberg	Mannheim_skyline_seen_from_Heidelberg,_20.7_km_away,_with_Ferris_wheel_and_wind_turbines_in_Rhineland-Palatinate	4	0	0
7	Bonn	Flag_of_North_Rhine-Westphalia North Rhine-Westphalia	Bonn_Kreuzbauten_Post_Tower	3	1	0
8	Düsseldorf	Flag_of_North_Rhine-Westphalia North Rhine-Westphalia	Düsseldorf_(DE),_Skyline_von_Oberkasseler_Brücke_--_2023_--_0059	3	0	0
9	Essen	Flag_of_North_Rhine-Westphalia North Rhine-Westphalia	Blick-auf-Essen-Hbf-Skyline-Abend-2013	3	0	0
10	Leipzig	Flag_of_Saxony Saxony	Fockeberg_leipzig	1	0	0
11	Offenbach am Main	Flag_of_Hesse Hesse	Offenbach_am_Main,_die_Skyline	1	0	0
12	Dortmund	Flag_of_North_Rhine-Westphalia North Rhine-Westphalia	Dortmund_Skyline_by_Night	1	0	0
13	Bremerhaven	Flag_of_Bremen Bremen	Skyline_bremerhaven_uf1	1	0	0
14	Augsburg	Flag_of_Bavaria_(lozengy) Bavaria	Augsburg_skyline	1	0	0
15	Timmendorfer Strand	Flag_of_Schleswig-Holstein Schleswig-Holstein	Timmendorfer_Strand	1	0	0
16	Fellbach	Flag_of_Baden-Württemberg Baden-Württemberg	Bahnhof_Fellbach_28	1	0	0
17	Jena	Flag_of_Thuringia Thuringia	Jena_Volksbad,_Paradiesbahnhof	1	0	0
18	Lübeck	Flag_of_Schleswig-Holstein Schleswig-Holstein	Skyline_travemuende	1	0	0
19	Nuremburg	Flag_of_Bavaria_(lozengy) Bavaria	Nürnberg_Skyline_Wöhrd_und_Tullnau	1	0	0
Total				102	22	6

== See also ==
- List of cities in Australia with the most skyscrapers
- List of cities in the United States with the most skyscrapers
- List of cities in Canada with the most skyscrapers
