= List of cities in Canada with the most skyscrapers =

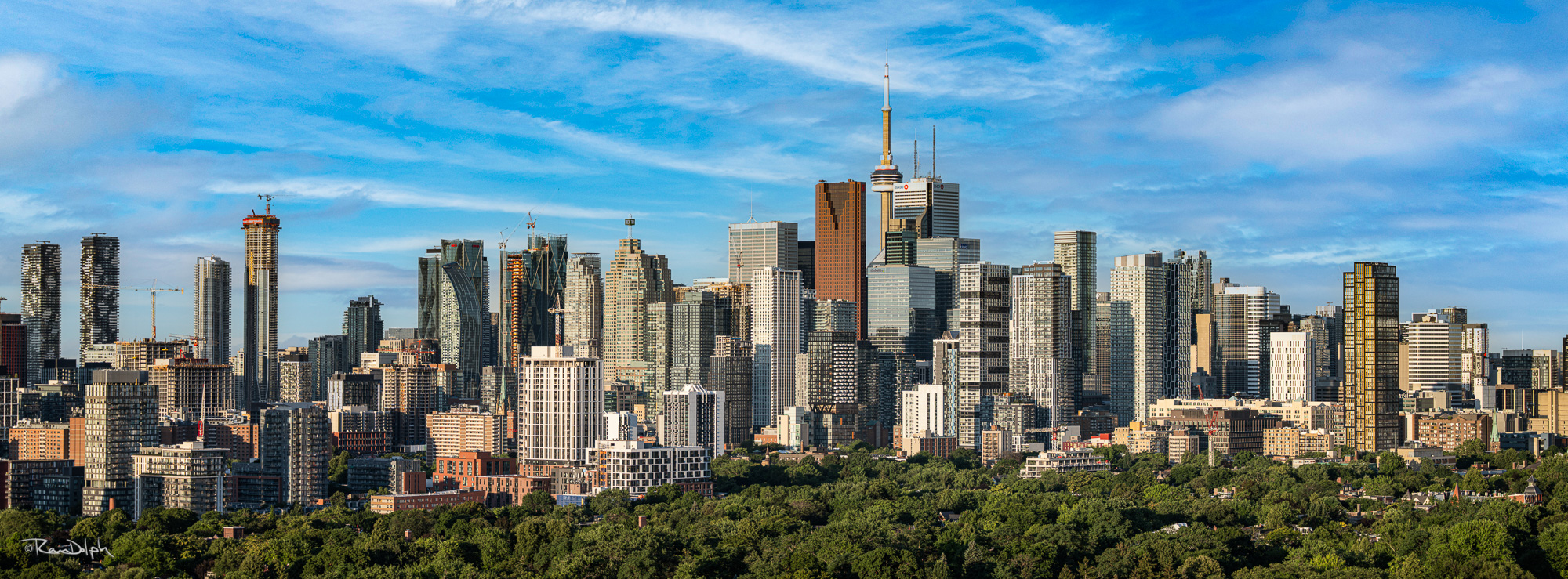
Toronto is the city with the most skyscrapers in Canada, regardless of the height used for the definition of a skyscraper.

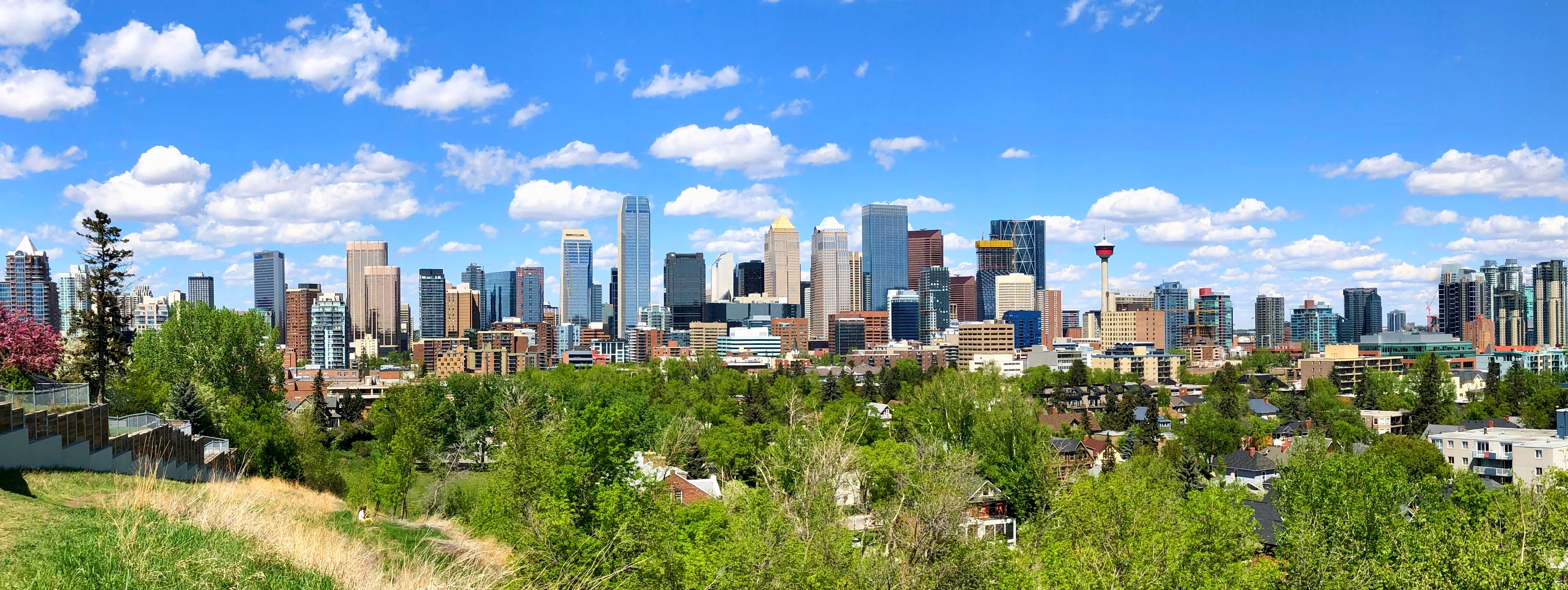
Calgary has the second most skyscrapers of any city in Canada.

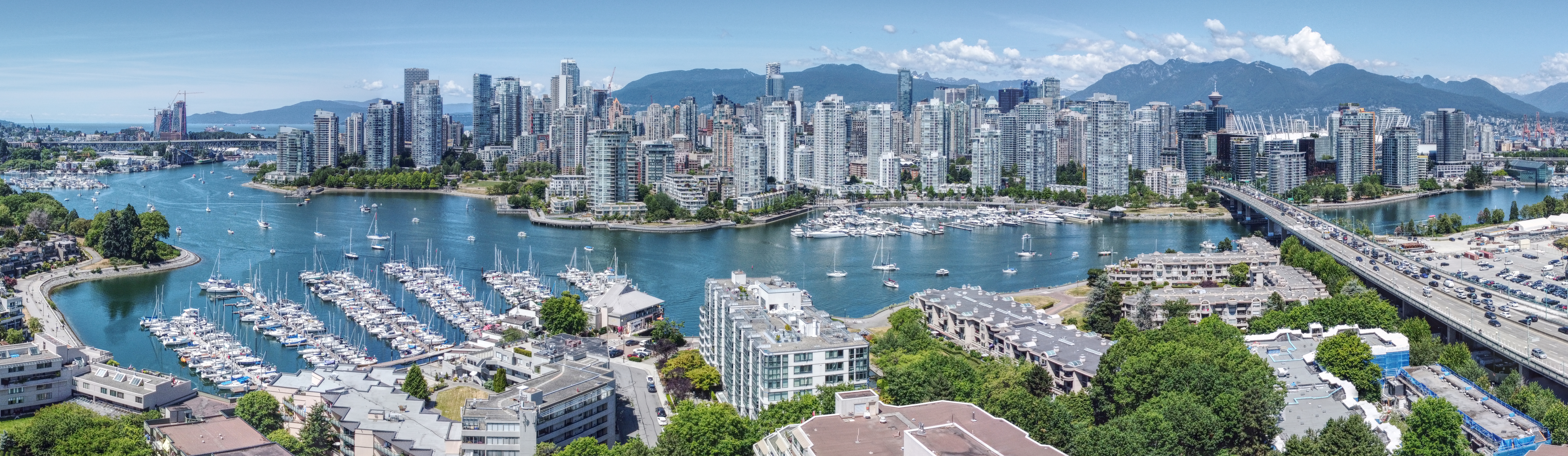
Greater Vancouver has the second most skyscrapers of any metropolitan area in Canada.

Canada is home to over 180 skyscrapers, defined as buildings taller than 150 metres (492 ft), the second most of any country in North America after the United States. Toronto is the city with the most skyscrapers in Canada by a wide margin, having 108 completed skyscrapers as of 2026, over half of all skycrapers in the country. It has five times as many skyscrapers as the city with the second most, Calgary. Two more cities, Montreal and Burnaby, have over 10 skyscrapers. As of 2026, there are 12 cities in Canada with at least one skyscraper taller than 150 m (492 ft), and 30 cities with at least one building exceeding 100 m (328 ft) in height.

In the first half of the 20th century, Toronto and Montreal led the country in tall buildings, each having two high-rises taller than 100 m (328 ft) by 1950. These were Toronto's Commerce Court North and Fairmont Royal York Hotel, and Montreal's Sun Life Building and Tour de la Banque Royale. Following a period of negligible high-rise development from the 1930s to the 1950s, skyscraper construction returned in Canada. In the early 1960s, several notable skyscrapers were completed in Montreal, such as CIBC Tower, Place Ville Marie, and Tour de la Bourse, each of which became the tallest building in Canada. In the 1970s, Toronto surpassed Montreal as Canada's main economic centre; by 1980, Toronto had overtaken Montreal in the number of skyscrapers. Calgary's skyline grew considerably in the 1970s and 1980s as the city grew into a major hub for the energy industry.

In the 21st century, the growth of high-rise residential condominiums have transformed the skylines of many Canadian cities. The quantity of skyscrapers in Toronto surged nearly tenfold in the first quarter of the century, from 11 skyscrapers in 2000 to 108 by 2025. The city currently has the third most skyscrapers in North America, and the second most buildings taller than 100 m, after New York City. Tall buildings have also sprouted throughout the city's metropolitan area, particularly in Mississauga and Vaughan.

The number of high-rises has also swelled in Greater Vancouver, which had 31 buildings taller than 100 m (328 ft) in 2000 and 175 by 2025. During this time, the amount of such buildings doubled in Vancouver itself, while many residential towers were constructed in the Metro Vancouver cities of Burnaby, Coquitlam, and Surrey. Due to height restrictions in Vancouver to preserve views of the surrounding mountains, Burnaby has eclipsed Vancouver in the number of skyscrapers reaching over 150 metres. Greater Vancouver is the metropolitan area with the second most skyscrapers in Canada.

== Cities with the most skyscrapers ==
The ranking of the cities with the most skyscrapers depends on the height used to define a skyscraper. Some cities may have more skyscrapers than another city under the definition of 100 m (328 ft), but less when under the definition of 150 m (492 ft). The table below ranks Canadian cities by the number of buildings taller than 100 m (328 ft) as of 2026 by default, but it can be adjusted to be sorted by the number of buildings taller than 150 m (492 ft) or 200 m (656 ft). Numbers without an accompanying citation are directly supported by information in the linked article.

Rank	City	Province	Image	Number of buildings		
Rank	City	Province	Image	≥100 m (328 ft)	≥150 m (492 ft)	≥200 m (656 ft)
1	Toronto	Ontario		405 (Note: This figure was obtained using the "Skyscraper Diagram" or "Timeline Diagram" function on SkyscraperPage by setting the minimum height to 100 m. Only the "built" and "high-rise buildings" options were selected for structure type and status respectively. SkyscraperPage may include buildings with estimated heights.)	111	32
2	Calgary	Alberta		83	20	5
3	Montreal	Quebec		73	18	6
4	Vancouver	British Columbia		72	7	1
5	Burnaby	British Columbia		57	17	1
6	Mississauga	Ontario		45	6	1
7	Edmonton	Alberta		25	2	1
8	Surrey	British Columbia		23	1	0
9	Vaughan	Ontario		19	8	0
10	Coquitlam	British Columbia		14	4	0
11	New Westminster	British Columbia		7	1	0
12	Markham	Ontario		6	0	0
13	Ottawa	Ontario		6	0	0
14	Winnipeg	Manitoba		6	0	0
15	Niagara Falls	Ontario		5	1	0
16	London	Ontario		5	0	0
17	Hamilton	Ontario		4	0	0
18	Kelowna	British Columbia		4	0	0
19	Halifax	Nova Scotia		3	0	0
20	Quebec City	Quebec		3	0	0
21	Brampton	Ontario		2	0	0
22	Gatineau	Quebec		2	0	0
23	Kitchener	Ontario		2	0	0
24	Barrie	Ontario		1	0	0
25	Burlington	Ontario		1	0	0
26	Delta	British Columbia		1	0	0
27	Langley	British Columbia		1	0	0
28	North Vancouver	British Columbia		1	0	0
29	Westmount	Quebec		1	0	0
30	Windsor	Ontario		1	0	0
Total				879	193	46

== Metropolitan areas with the most skyscrapers ==
City boundaries may exclude buildings in the same metropolitan area from being included in its list of skyscrapers. This table ranks census metropolitan areas (CMAs) in Canada by the amount of 100 m (328 ft) buildings.The final column shows the number of such buildings in a metropolitan area for every million inhabitants. Only Toronto and Vancouver have multiple cities in their metropolitan area with at least one skyscraper taller than 150 m (492 ft).

Rank	Census metropolitan area	Province	Image	City (100 m buildings)	Total	Population (2021)	100 m buildings per million (Note: Calculated by dividing the number of buildings with census metropolitan area (CMA) population, and multiplying the result by a million. Rounded to the nearest decimal point.)
1	Toronto	Ontario		Toronto (405); Mississauga (45); Vaughan (19); Markham (6); Brampton (2)	477	6,202,225	76.9
2	Vancouver	British Columbia		Vancouver (72); Burnaby (57); Surrey (23); Coquitlam (14); New Westminster (7); Delta (1); Langley (1); North Vancouver (1)	176	2,642,825	66.6
3	Calgary	Alberta		Calgary (83)	83	1,481,806	56.0
4	Montreal	Quebec		Montreal (73); Westmount (1)	74	4,291,732	17.2
5	Edmonton	Alberta		Edmonton (25)	25	1,418,118	17.6
6	Ottawa–Gatineau	Ontario; Quebec		Ottawa (6); Gatineau (2)	8	1,488,307	5.4
7	Winnipeg	Manitoba		Winnipeg (6)	6	834,678	7.2
8	Hamilton	Ontario		Hamilton (4); Burlington (1)	5	785,184	6.4
9	London	Ontario		London (5)	5	543,551	9.2
10	St. Catharines–Niagara	Ontario		Niagara Falls (5)	5	433,604	11.5
11	Kelowna	British Columbia		Kelowna (4)	4	222,162	18.0
12	Halifax	Nova Scotia		Halifax (3)	3	465,703	6.4
13	Quebec City	Quebec		Quebec City (3)	3	839,311	3.6
14	Kitchener–Cambridge–Waterloo	Ontario		Kitchener (2)	2	575,847	3.5
15	Barrie	Ontario		Barrie (1)	1	212,856	4.7
16	Windsor	Ontario		Windsor (1)	1	422,630	2.4

== See also ==
- List of cities with the most skyscrapers
- List of cities in Australia with the most skyscrapers
- List of cities in the United States with the most skyscrapers
- List of cities in Germany with the most skyscrapers
- List of tallest buildings in Canada
