= List of tallest buildings in London, Ontario =

Skyline of London
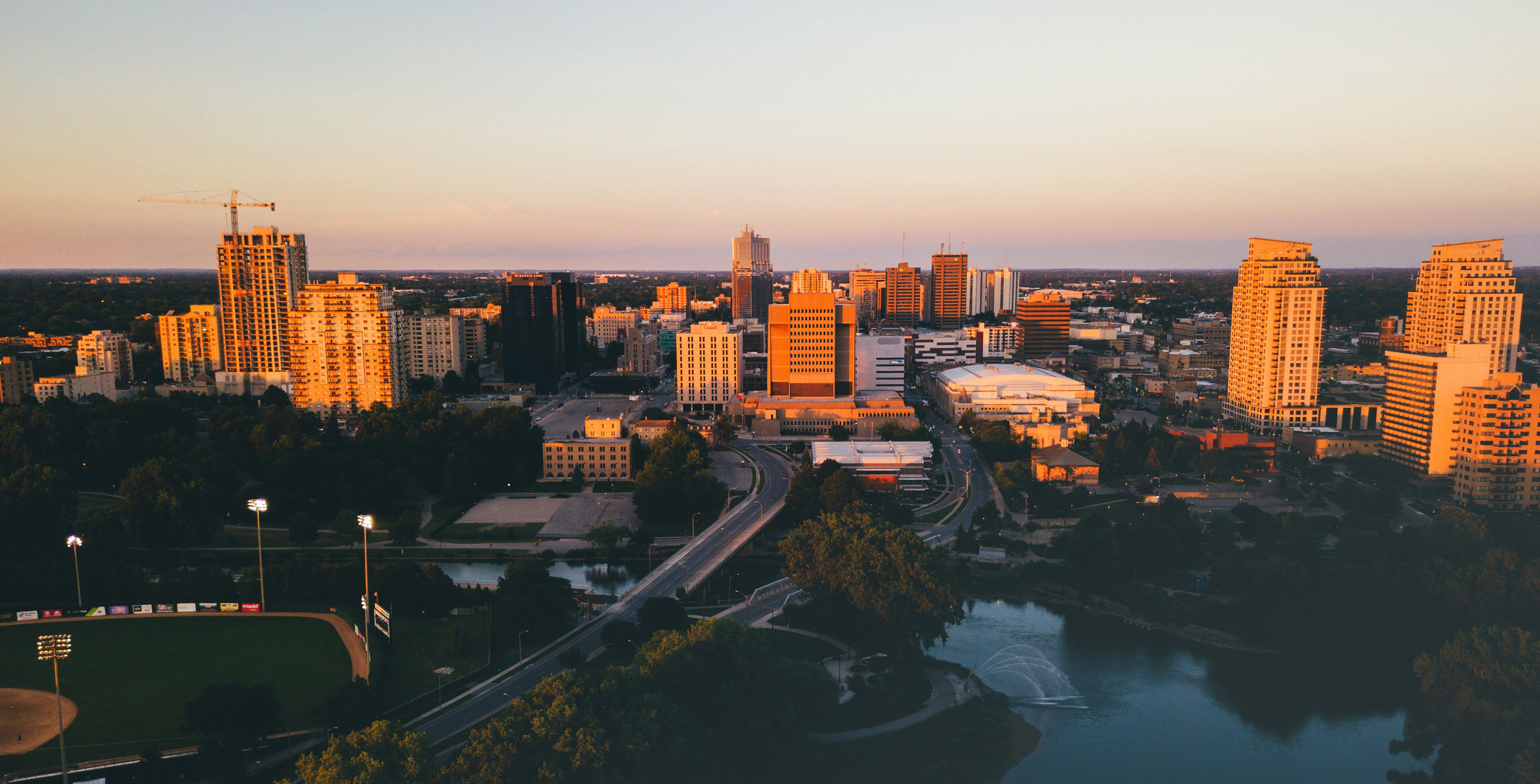
- Downtown London in 2017
- Tallest building: Centro South (2025)
- Tallest building height: 135.3 m (444 ft)

Number of tall buildings (2026)
- Taller than 75 m (246 ft): 19
- Taller than 100 m (328 ft): 5

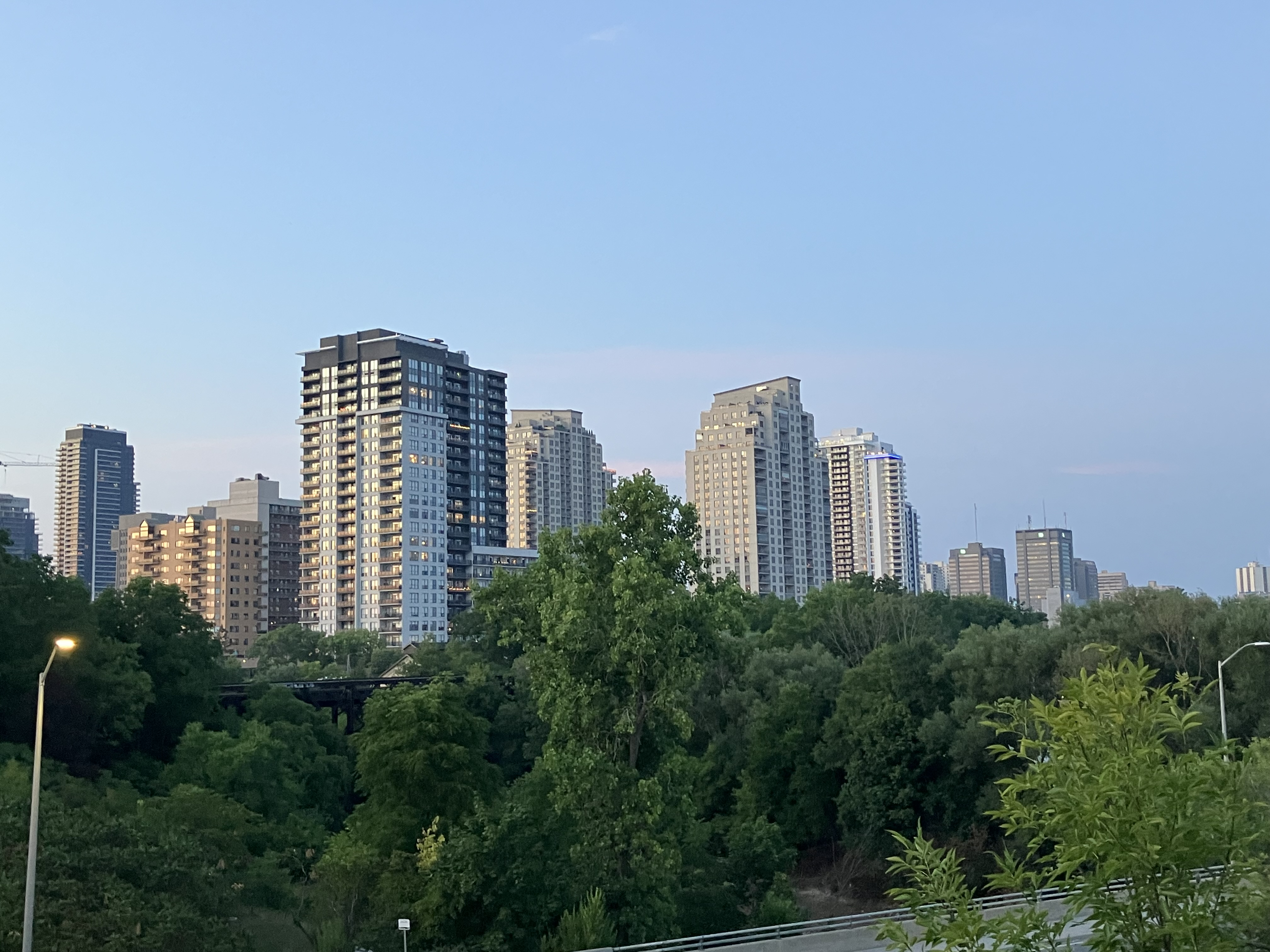
Skyline of London in 2025

London is the largest city in the Canadian region of Southwestern Ontario, with a metropolitan area population of 543,551 as of 2021. London is home to 19 completed buildings that stand taller than 75 metres (246 ft), five of which are taller than 100 m (328 ft) as of 2026. The tallest building in the city is the 40-storey, 135.3 m (444 ft) Centro South Tower, which was completed in 2025. The second tallest building is the 24-storey, 109 m (358 ft) One London Place, which was the tallest building in the city from 1992 to 2025. Since the mid-2010s, London has seen an influx of residential high-rises, similar to other cities in Southern Ontario such as Kitchener or Hamilton.

No high-rises were constructed in London during the first half of the 20th century, with the tallest building in the city being the nine-storey Huron and Erie Building, which was built in 1931. The 1960s saw the arrival of the city's first residential and commercial high-rises. The City Centre Towers, a twin office tower complex, was completed in 1974, becoming the city's two tallest buildings and a centrepiece of London's skyline. The taller south tower reaches a height of 92 m (301 ft). The towers were the tallest buildings in Southwestern Ontario until 1992, when One London Place was completed.

In the 21st century, London's skyline is increasingly characterized by residential high-rise buildings, driven by the city's high population growth. The city is undergoing a high-rise construction boom. Since 2018, four buildings taller than 100 m (328 ft) have risen in London, compared to only one beforehand, that being One London Place. Upon its completion in 2025, Centro South Tower became the tallest building in London and the tallest building in Canada between Mississauga and Calgary. London's tallest buildings are concentrated in the city's downtown, which is located east of the confluence of the Thames River and North Thames River.

== History ==
Number of buildings by height in London by the end of each year, based on the information in this article. Click on the legend to toggle a specific height on or off. View chart definition.

== Cityscape ==
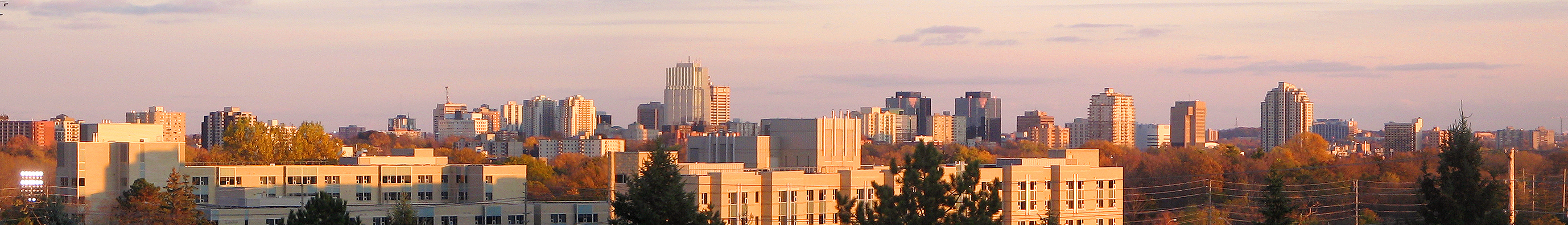
Panorama of London's skyline in 2020

== Map of tallest buildings ==
This map displays the location of buildings taller than 75 m (246 ft) in London, all of which are in the city's downtown. Each marker is numbered by the building's height rank, and coloured by the decade of its completion.

Buildings taller than 75 m (246 ft) in London, Ontario.
- 1970s
- 1980s
- 1990s
- 2000s
- 2010s
- 2020s
1 Centro South Tower
2 One London Place
3 One Richmond Row
4 Aqui on King
5 Azure
6 Renaissance North
7 Renaissance South
8 London City Centre South
9 Riverwalk
10 Clarence Square London
11 London City Centre North
12 SOHOSQ
13 City Place Apartments East
14 City Place Apartments West
15 The Harriston
16 Talbot Centre East
17 Talbot Centre West
18 Colborne Centre Apartments North
19 Colborne Centre Apartments South

== Tallest buildings ==
This list ranks completed buildings in London that stand at least 75 m (246 ft) tall as of 2026, based on standard height measurement. This includes spires and architectural details but does not include antenna masts. The “Year” column indicates the year of completion. Buildings tied in height are sorted by year of completion with earlier buildings ranked first, and then alphabetically.

Was the tallest building in London upon completion

Rank	Name	Image	Location	Height m (ft)	Floors	Year	Purpose	Notes
1	Centro South Tower		42°59′06″N 81°15′12″W	135.4 (444)	40	2025	Residential	Tallest building in London since 2025. Tallest building completed in London in the 2020s. Also known as Centro 1.
2	One London Place		42°59′08″N 81°14′48″W	109 (358)	24	1992	Office	Tallest building in London from 1992 to 2025. Tallest building in London completed in the 1990s. Tallest office building in London.
3	One Richmond Row		42°59′14″N 81°15′04″W	104.6 (343)	32	2021	Residential	
4	Aqui on King	—	42°58′55″N 81°15′00″W	103.6 (340)	32	2024	Residential	Also known as 131 King Street.
5	Azure	—	42°59′10″N 81°15′14″W	100.3 (329)	30	2018	Residential	Tallest building completed in London in the 2010s.
6	Renaissance North	—	42°58′53″N 81°15′10″W	95.7 (314)	28	2009	Residential	Tallest building completed in London in the 2000s
7	Renaissance South	—	42°58′50″N 81°15′09″W	95.7 (314)	28	2013	Residential	
8	London City Centre South		42°59′03″N 81°14′39″W	91.8 (301)	22	1974	Office	Also known as City Centre Tower South. Tallest building in London from 1974 to 1992. Tallest building completed in London in the 1970s.
9	Riverwalk		42°58′48″N 81°15′16″W	89.6 (294)	24	2021	Residential	
10	Clarence Square London		42°59′01″N 81°14′54″W	89.6 (294)	25	2024	Residential	
11	London City Centre North		42°59′05″N 81°14′40″W	83.5 (274)	20	1974	Office	Also known as City Centre Tower North.
12	SOHOSQ	—	42°58′35″N 81°14′09″W	83.2 (273)	23	2025	Residential	
13	City Place Apartments East	—	42°59′09″N 81°14′35″W	78.7 (258)	25	2005	Residential	
14	City Place Apartments West	—	42°59′09″N 81°14′38″W	78.7 (258)	25	2004	Residential	
15	The Harriston	—	42°59′06″N 81°15′18″W	76.2 (250)	23	2008	Residential	
16	Talbot Centre East		42°59′08″N 81°15′05″W	75.6 (248)	18	1989	Office	Tallest buildings completed in London in the 1980s.
17	Talbot Centre West		42°59′07″N 81°15′09″W	75.6 (248)	18	1989	Office	Tallest buildings completed in London in the 1980s.
18	Colborne Centre Apartments North	—	42°59′05″N 81°14′22″W	75.3 (247)	26	1987	Residential	
19	Colborne Centre Apartments South	—	42°59′04″N 81°14′21″W	75.3 (247)	26	1987	Residential	

== Tallest under construction or proposed ==
=== Under construction ===
The following table includes buildings under construction in London that are planned to be at least 75 m (246 ft) tall as of 2026, based on standard height measurement. The “Year” column indicates the expected year of completion. Buildings that are on hold are not included.

Name	Height m (ft)	Floors	Year	Purpose	Notes
300-320 King Street	110 (360)	35	—	Residential	
Centro North Tower	101.3 (332)	29	2026	Residential	

=== Proposed ===
The following table includes approved and proposed buildings in London that are expected to be at least 75 m (246 ft) tall as of 2026, based on standard height measurement. The “Year” column indicates the expected year of completion. A dash “–“ indicates information about the building’s height, floor count, or year of completion is unknown or has not been released.

Name	Height m (ft)	Floors	Year	Purpose	Notes
50 King St. A	171.5 (563)	53	—	Residential	
50 King St. B	141 (463)	42	—	Residential	
743 Richmond	124.5 (408)	35	—	Residential	
67 York St. A	—	45	—	Residential	
67 York St. B	—	40	—	Residential	
195 Dundas Street A	—	35	—	Residential	
195 Dundas Street B	—	32	—	Residential	

== Timeline of tallest buildings ==
This lists buildings that once held the title of the tallest building in London.

Name	Image	Years as tallest	Height m (ft)	Floors	References
Huron and Erie Building	—	1931–1964	39.9 (131)	9	
The Whitehall	—	1964–1971	49.4 (162)	16	
London City Hall		1971–1972	53.4 (175)	12	
University Hospital		1972–1973	55.5 (182)	12	
383 Richmond	—	1973–1974	60.3 (198)	14	
London City Centre South		1974–1992	91.8 (301)	22	
One London Place		1992–2025	109 (358)	24	
Centro South Tower		2025–present	135.4 (444)	40	

== See also ==
- Canadian architecture
- List of tallest buildings in Canada
- List of tallest buildings in Ontario
- List of tallest buildings in Toronto
- List of tallest buildings in the Waterloo Regional Municipality
