= Canada Building =

Canada Building may refer to:

in Canada

- Canada Building (Saskatoon), historic property, located in Saskatoon, Saskatchewan
- Canada Building (Windsor), in Windsor, Ontario (former tallest building in Canada)
