= Business Tower Nürnberg =

Skyscraper in Nürnberg, Germany

- Nürnberg Geschäftsturm (German)
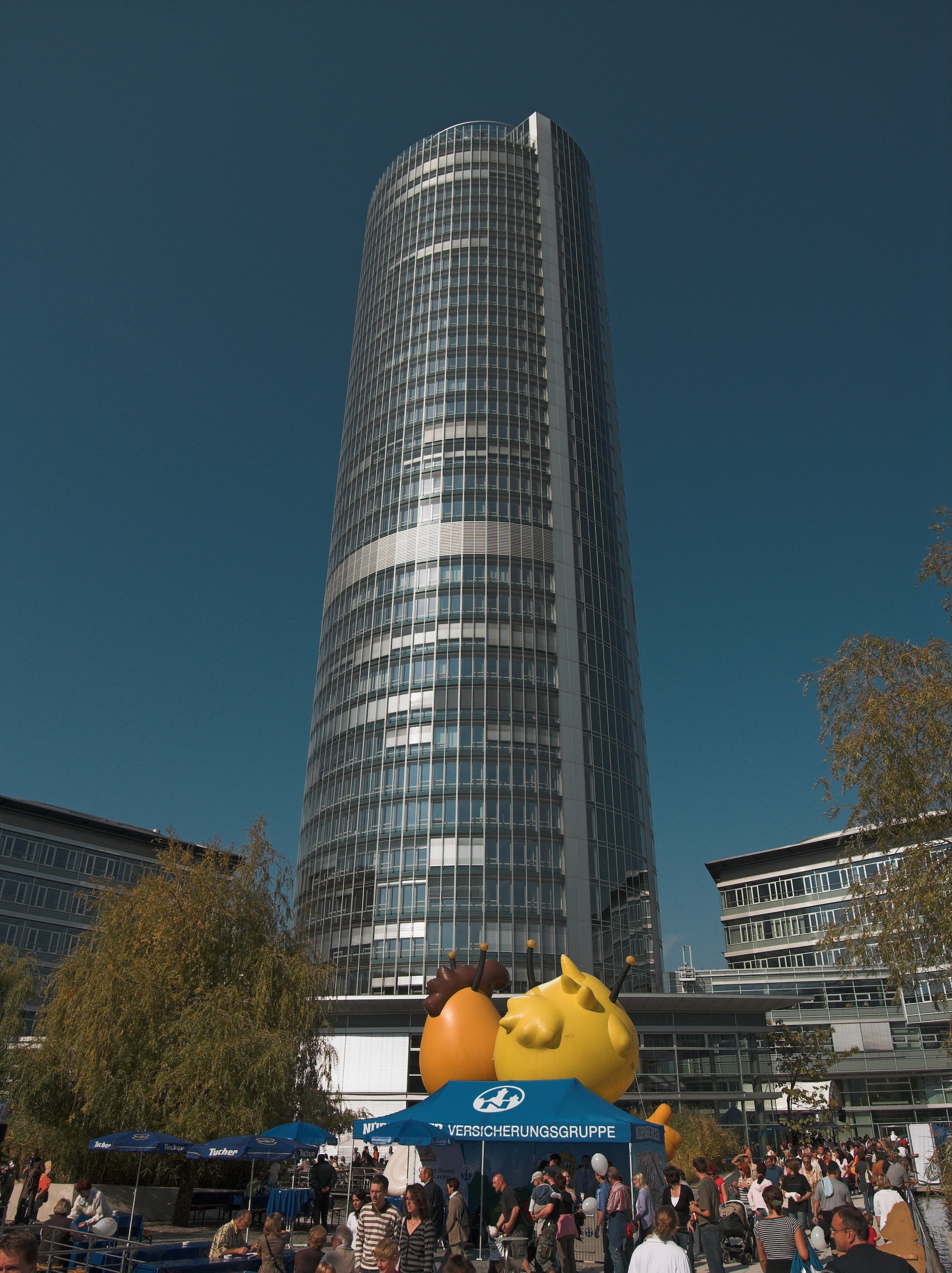
- Interactive map of the Business Tower Nürnberg area

General information
- Status: Completed
- Type: Office
- Location: Nürnberg, Germany, 100 Ostendstraße, Nürnberg, Germany
- Coordinates: 49.454581°N 11.116883°E
- Construction started: 1996
- Completed: 2000
- Opened: October 12, 2000
- Cost: € 204,520,000
- Owner: Nürnberger Versicherung

Height
- Roof: 135 m (443 ft)

Technical details
- Structural system: Concrete
- Floor count: 35
- Floor area: 32,000 m^{2} (344,000 sq ft) (The tower)
- Lifts/elevators: 6

Design and construction
- Architects: Architekturbüro Spengler; Dürschinger & Biefang
- Structural engineer: Ing.-Büro Kunkel + Partner KG (Structural); Drees & Sommer Advanced Building (MEP)

The Business Tower Nürnberg (German: Nürnberg Geschäftsturm) is an office skyscraper in Nürnberg, Germany. Built between 1996 and 2000, the tower stands at 135 m (443 ft) tall with 35 floors and is the current tallest building in Nuremberg and the first 100 meters high-rise building in the city, as well as the 35th tallest in Germany.

== History ==
A total of 110 designs and models were submitted for the architectural competition for the new building announced by the Nuremberg Insurance Company in October 1992. In addition to 100,000 m^{2} and 4,500 workplaces, the client wanted a company canteen, a printing works, conference and meeting rooms, a material warehouse, as well as an underground car park with at least 1,000 parking spaces and spacious outdoor areas. On March 19, 1993, the first prize went to the architects Friedrich Biefang and Peter Dürschinger, who optimized their design from 1994 to 1996.

On June 3, 1996, the symbolic groundbreaking ceremony took place on the site acquired on June 1, 1992. The foundation stone was laid on December 11, 1996. The first construction phase of the new general management was inaugurated on September 8, 1998, and work on the second construction phase had already begun in parallel. The tower grew by one floor per week during the construction phase, so that the tower reached its final height in spring 2000. With the completion of the second construction phase, the 34-story business tower was also completed. The ceremonial inauguration of the entire complex took place on October 12, 2000. At that time, the BTN was the tallest office building in Bavaria; today it is the second tallest. A few days after the official inauguration, the Nuremberg Insurance Company invited people to the first open day, which was attended by around 30,000 visitors.

The building serves as the head office of the Nuremberg Insurance company. On the ground floor and first floor there is a catering area with a restaurant and barista bar. After the Nuremberg telecommunications tower, the BTN is the second tallest building in Nuremberg with 34 floors. It is one of the tallest skyscrapers in Germany and was the tallest office building in Bavaria until the Uptown Munich skyscraper was completed . The building complex consists of a seven-story block perimeter development in the shape of a square, with the cylindrical office tower attached to one corner. The atrium encloses a spacious water area with greenery.

== Architecture ==
=== Statistics ===
The official height of the tower is of 135 m up to the gondola. The main materials used for structure and glazing were reinforced concrete and glass, as the building displays a cylindrical shape with a diameter of 32.5 m and a total mass of approximately 50.000 tons. Each floor houses a total of 18 floors which can vary as per gross usable area from 18 to 420 m^{2} per unit. The building also houses a total of 6 elevators of which two go up to the 34th floor, and four to the 30th floor. Two of the main elevators are serving as freight and fire service elevators with capacities of 2,500 kg / 33 people. Each elevator has a maximum capacity of 1,600 kg / 21 persons and a reaches speeds of 4.2 m/s. A trip to the top floors takes about 40 seconds.

=== Materials and quantities ===
- Staircases: 2, each with 737 steps
- BACnet (Building Automation and Control Networks):
- BACnet hardware data points: 50,000
- BACnet software and hardware data points: 520,000
- BACnet data points in the elevators of the office tower: 1,000
- Glass sandwich double facade : 1,600 individual parts, each 2.30 m wide and 3.40 m high
- Columns in the tower: diameter between 90 cm (bottom) and 30 cm (top) (columns taper towards the top)
- Foundation: stands on 52 bored piles
- Diameter: 1.30 m
- Length: up to 22 m
- Base plate: 1.50 m thick
- Overall, the tower moved about 20 mm.
- Jobs: 4,000, of which 2,700 are at Nürnberger Versicherung
- Area of the entire site: 32,000 m^{2}
- Area of the courtyard: 13,000 m^{2}
- Area of the lake in the courtyard: 8,000 m^{2}
- Depth of the lake in the courtyard: 1.5 m
- Water volume of the lake in the courtyard: 12,000 m^{3}
- Beton: 74,000 m^{3}
- Stahl: 12,000 t
- Glass: 52,000 m
- Plasterboard walls: 29,500 m^{2}
- Facing shells: 2,600 m^{2}
- Plasterboard ceilings: 5,100 m^{2}
- Reflective ceilings in the entrance area and foyer: 1,875 m^{2}
- Metal ceilings in adjoining rooms: 2,200 m^{2}
- Skylight glazing: 3,600 m^{2}
- Facade swords with sound insulation: 650

=== Construction ===
The building structure rises to a height of 135 m, which corresponds to the end of the core zone. This height is considered the official height of the building. The roof of the last floor, which is also an observation platform, is at a height of almost 120 m. This platform is surrounded by a 2.5 m high glass wall, which is the upper end of the external glass facade. The building displays an underground car park with 842 parking spaces on 2 levels with charging infrastructure for e-mobility, located under the artificial lake in the courtyard, and a helipad on the west wing, visually resembling a saucer. The subsoil layering sees a composition of sandstone rock (up to about 20 m depth only sand).

The block development is used primarily by the Nürnberger Versicherung, which also financed the construction of the building complex. The space in the office tower is rented to various companies, including those from the insurance, auditing, online marketing, banking and finance, wholesale, legal advice, healthcare, building automation, IT consulting and maintenance sectors. The room areas can be used flexibly as an open space or for a classic cell structure. Full-surface silent cooling and draft-free ventilation ensure a healthy climate in the offices.

Users can rent modern conference rooms of various sizes equipped with the latest technology (pay-per-use). The core zone of the building contains elevators, copy rooms, sanitary facilities, but also technical rooms, archives and tea kitchens. The two staircases are located in a separate shaft that extends from the façade in the northeast and forms the "backbone" of the otherwise cylindrical tower.

Responsible for the construction were the architectural firm Spengler and the architects Dürschinger and Biefang from Ammerndorf, who designed the entire building. The office tower has a double-glazed facade made up of around 1,600 individual parts with steel threads embedded in the glass. These have a radar-wave-dampening effect, as the airport is within sight of the tower. The glass facade reaches a height of around 130 m - so it ends around 2.5 m above the observation deck. There is a platform on the roof of the Business Tower at a height of almost 128 m. This is normally not accessible - not even for the employees who work in the building - but it is open to visitors on certain occasions organized by the Nuremberg Insurance Company. The center of the platform is the core of the tower, on which an antenna is attached.

=== Equipment ===
The Business Tower's double facade provides the basis for energy-efficient natural ventilation. If external conditions do not permit this, central ventilation and air conditioning systems take over energy-efficient room climate control.

The intelligent room control and regulation records all important parameters, such as room temperature, room humidity and occupancy status. This optimizes the required media such as cooling and heating. The primary energy requirement is reduced as far as possible through demand-based requirements. The sun protection is automatically lowered when the outside temperature is high to prevent the room from heating up. Or it stays up when the outside temperature is low and there is sunlight in order to utilize the heat input. Modular room controllers and higher-level functions in the central control system enable flexible room and area management. Room control devices allow individual settings by the user, so that the intelligent automatic functions for energy optimization can be changed at any time by the user's personal settings. A comfortable climate, user requirements and energy savings are in consensus.

All relevant information from the rooms and the central ventilation, cooling and heating systems is stored, evaluated and optimized in a central database in the control technology. These intelligently recognize failure patterns, provide information and thereby increase system availability for the user. An energy management tool in the control technology records all energy and measured value data in order to automatically monitor them for value ranges and deviations. This prevents higher consumption from occurring due to errors or faults. All automation systems used take into account the current requirements of the BSI (Federal Office for Information Security) in terms of data protection, data security and interventions in security-relevant data. This also serves to protect the users in the office space.

The individual room control allows users to individually regulate the light and blinds, as well as the heating (+3/−3 °C). The humidity, on the other hand, is controlled centrally. Room users can also open the windows and flaps of the interior glass facade, which allows natural ventilation almost all year round without major heat loss or noise pollution. The sun protection curtain behind the outer shell of the facade remains fully effective throughout the entire tower, even on windy days. Air exchange via the corridors is also possible. The room air is exchanged about twice an hour.

=== Green energy balance ===
In the inner courtyard is the 8,000 m^{2} so-called Nuremberg Lake. The water required is provided by the partially green roof areas and underground cisterns - concrete water storage tanks with a total volume of 1,480 m^{3}. This water is also used for other outdoor facilities, sprinkler systems and fire protection, so that drinking water consumption is not too high, rainwater is discharged into the sewer in an environmentally friendly manner and the municipal sewage treatment plant is not overloaded. Thanks to some solar panels installed on the nearby railway line, which provide solar heat for the treatment of domestic water, district heating is not required in summer. The braking energy of the elevators is used, which means that up to 20% of the electricity consumption of the elevators can be recovered. Water-cooled ceiling panels ensure pleasant temperatures in summer. The central cooling system enables efficient and more economical operation. The refrigeration system, consisting of cooling towers and chillers, was gradually renovated between 2014 and 2018. Modern drive technologies mean that the cold water is produced with significantly less electricity consumption.

When operating the building, great importance is attached to the avoidance and reduction of CO_{2} emissions. In order to reduce energy consumption, a number of measures have been implemented to increase energy efficiency. For example, a large part of the interior and exterior lighting has been converted to LED technology and the ventilation systems have been converted to more efficient and energy-saving drive systems. The building is supplied with 100% green electricity from renewable energies. The entire building complex is heated emission-free using district heating from a highly efficient CHP plant (combined heat and power).

== Trivia ==
=== Criticism ===
Due to the light column pointing vertically upwards at night, the Business Tower has been criticized as a source of light pollution . Only about 10% of the light is said to illuminate the building, while 90% is scattered into the sky (as of 2008). In 2019, the lighting of the Business Tower was converted to LED and the light output reduced so that the formerly very bright light column above the tower is now significantly weaker and no longer interferes with observations at the observatory . In addition, the lighting is switched off at 11 p.m. at the latest and is even dispensed with completely on special astronomical occasions.

=== Etymology ===
The building is called Business Tower Nuremberg because it is a name that is understandable beyond the borders (as described above, international offices are located in the BTN). It also represents the purpose of the building; the name is also intended to signal modernity.

== Gallery ==
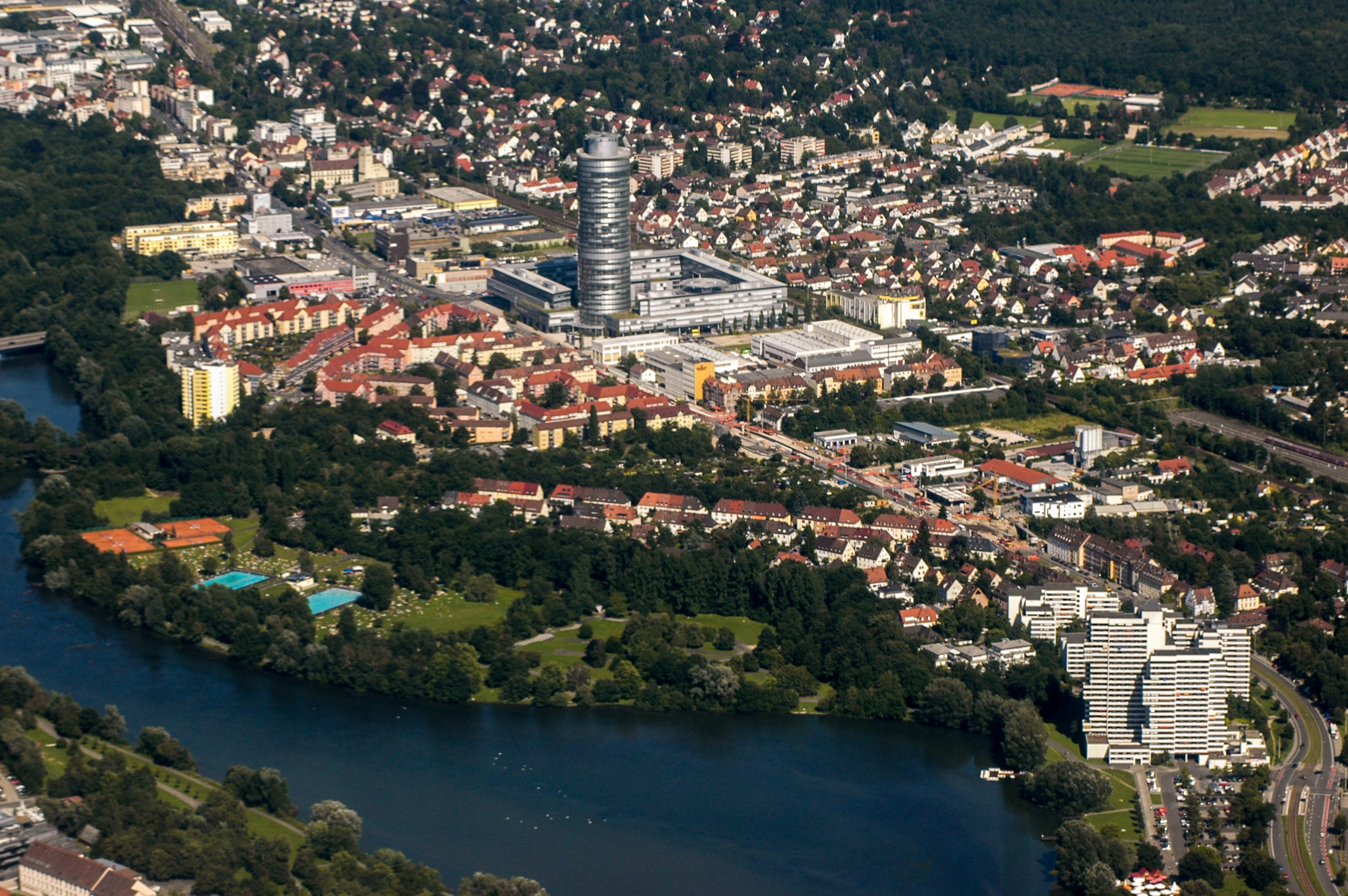
Aerial photograph, 2009

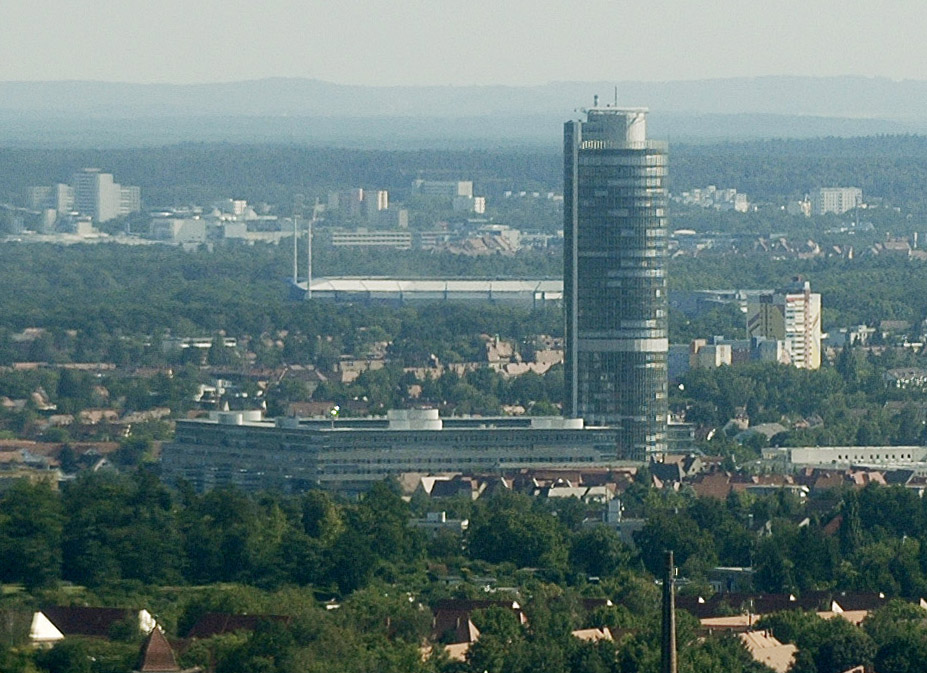
Aerial photograph, 2009

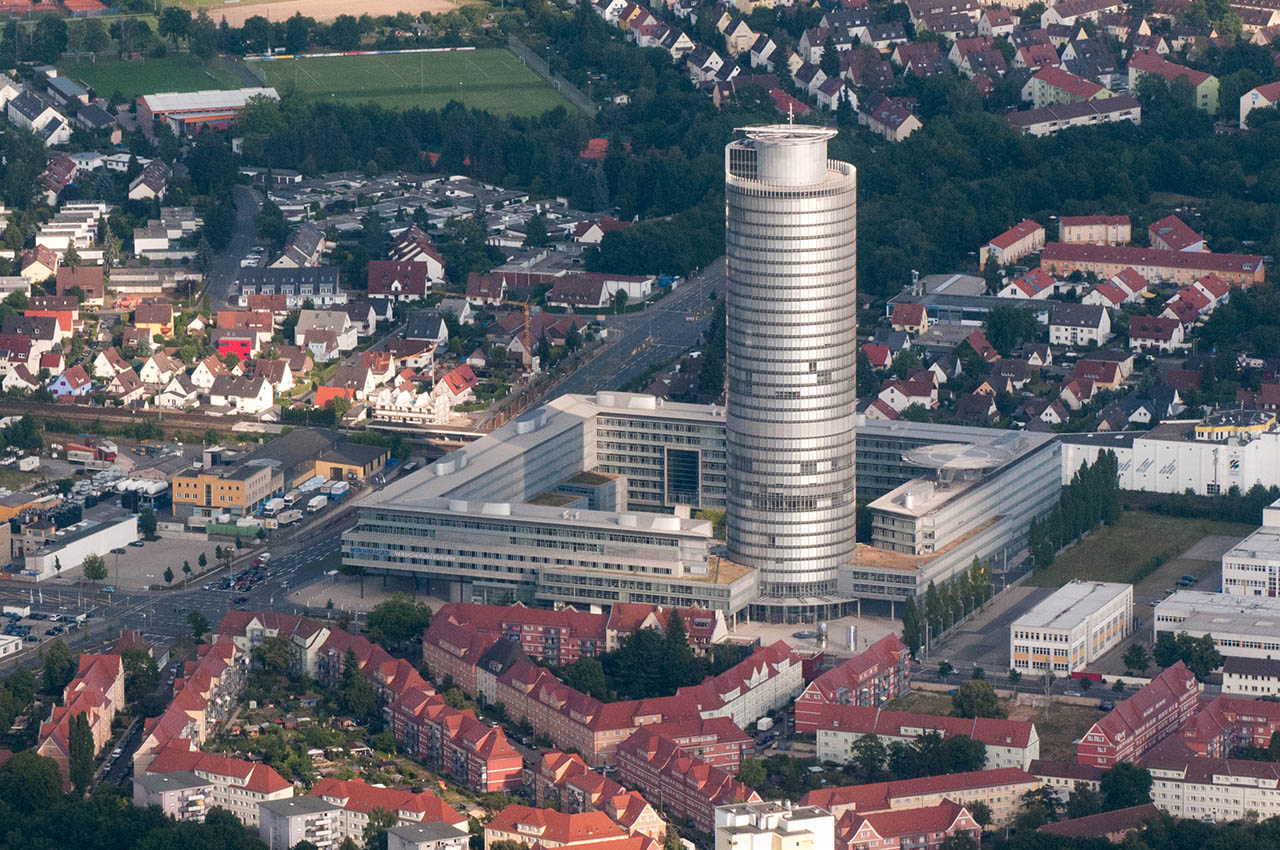
Aerial photograph, 2014

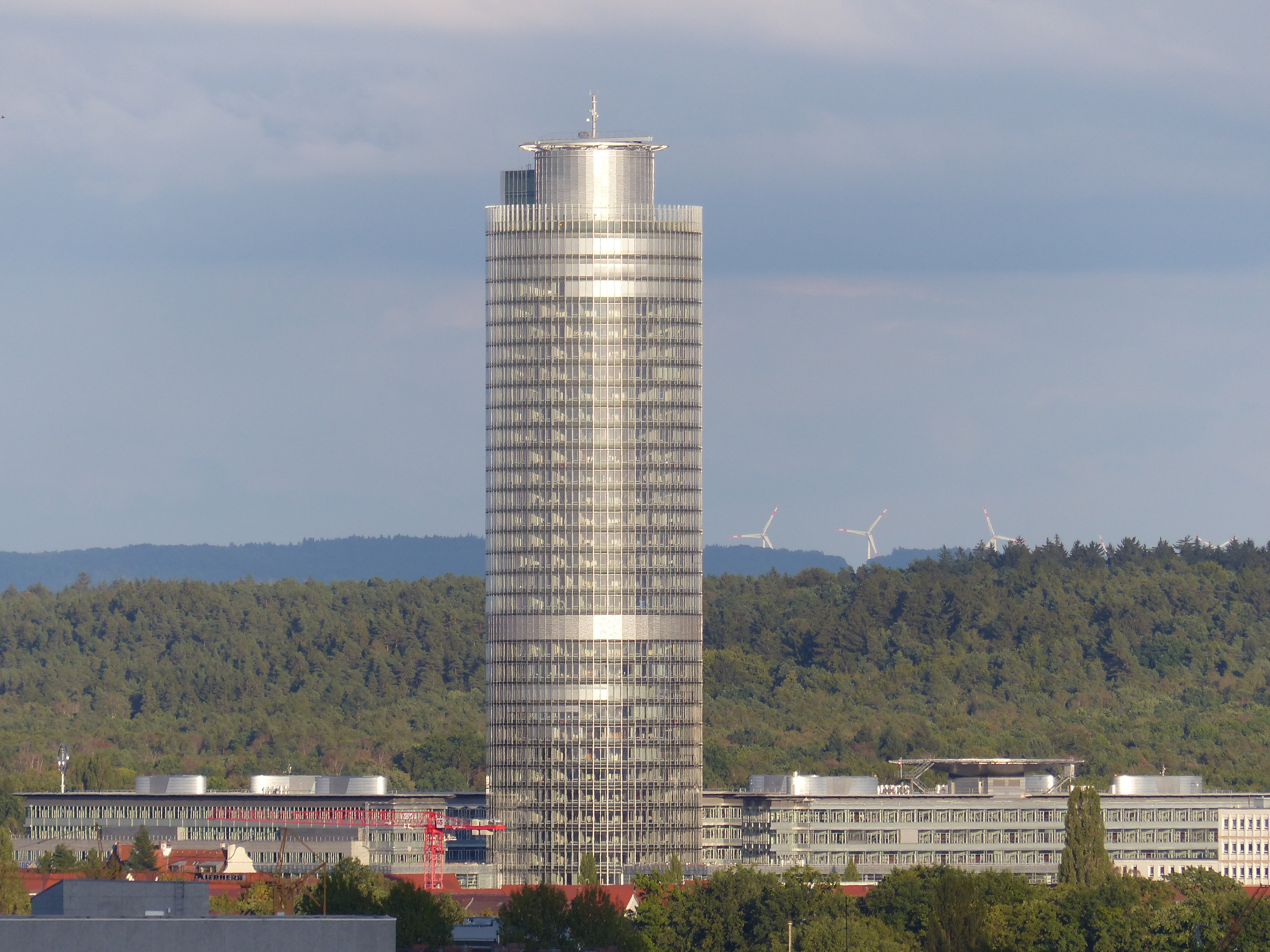
View from the Nuremberg Castle

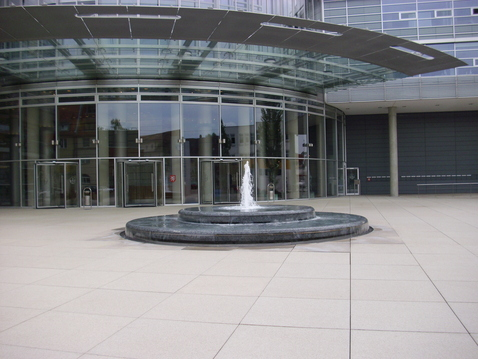
Entrance fountain

== See also ==
- List of tallest buildings in Nuremberg
- List of tallest buildings in Germany
