= City Centre Towers =

London City Centre is a twin office tower complex in London, Ontario

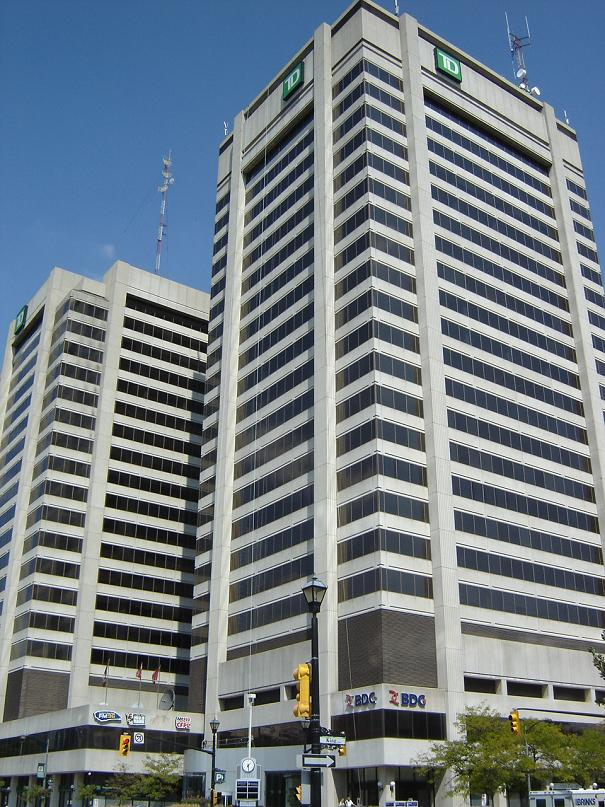
- City Centre Towers
- Interactive map of the City Centre Towers area
- Alternative names: London City Centre

General information
- Type: Office
- Location: London, Ontario
- Coordinates: 42.98573°N 81.24659°W
- Completed: 1974

Height
- Roof: South - 96 m (315 ft); North - 89 m (292 ft)

Technical details
- Floor count: South - 23; North - 19
- Floor area: 50,118 m^{2} (539,470 sq ft)
- Lifts/elevators: South - 6 North - 5

Design and construction
- Architect: Paul M. skinner

City Centre or London City Centre is a twin office tower complex in London, Ontario, Canada at 275 Dundas Street. Construction on the towers was finished in 1974. The South tower is 96 m tall, and is the second tallest building in the city and one of the tallest office buildings in Ontario outside Toronto. The North tower is 89 meters tall and is the third tallest office building in the city. The buildings are one of several twin tower complexes in London's central business district. The towers were the tallest buildings in Southwestern Ontario from 1974, to 1992 when One London Place was completed.

The towers are 64% occupied by TD bank which holds its regional offices within the complex. Overall the complex is 94% leased as of July 2011, owing to London's strong economy and business market.
