= List of tallest buildings in Windsor, Ontario =

Skyline of Windsor
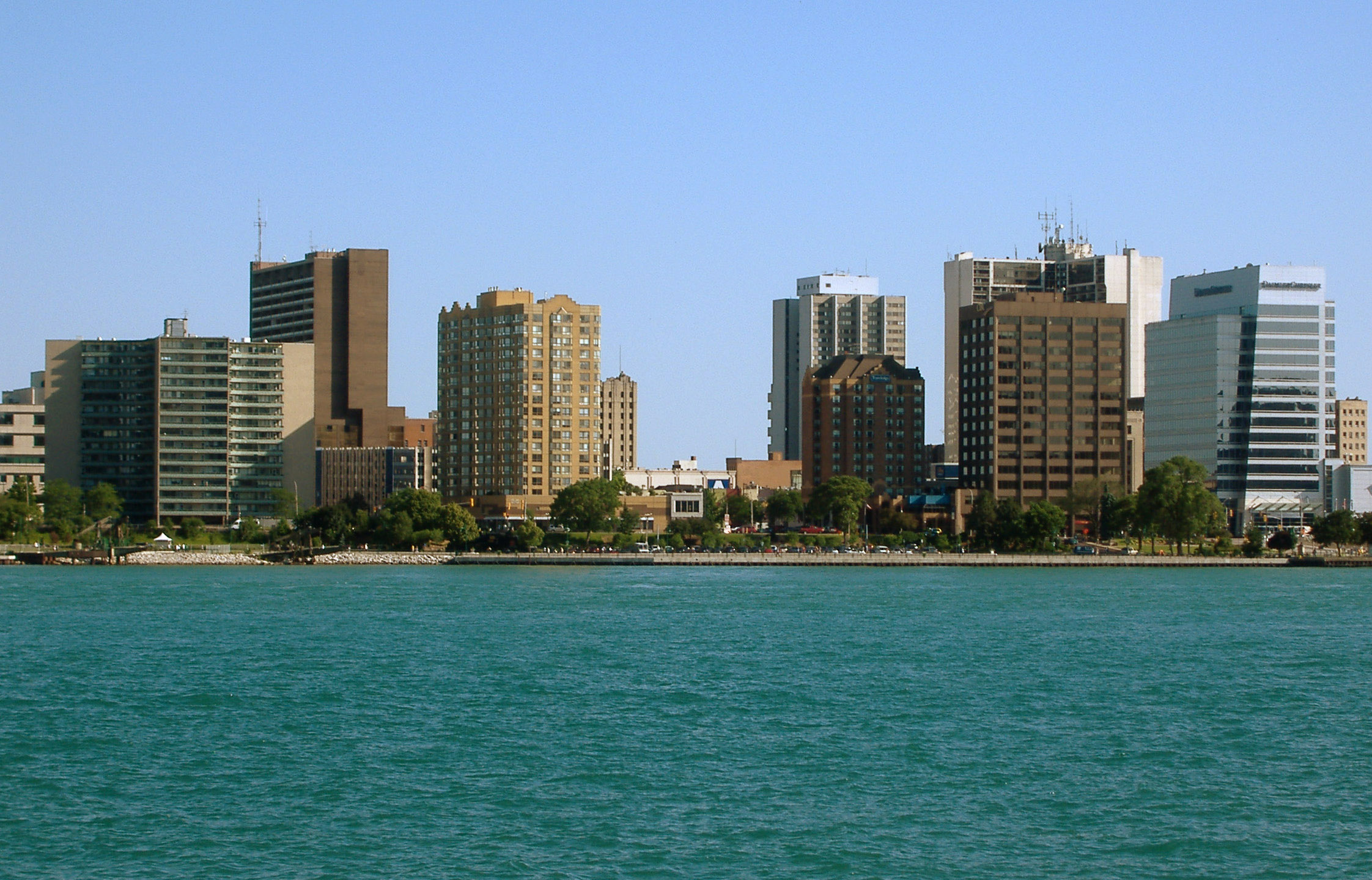
- Windsor's financial district.
- Tallest building: Caesars Windsor Augustus Tower (2008)
- Tallest building height: 111 m (364 ft)

Number of tall buildings
- Taller than 50 m (164 ft): 15 (2025)
- Taller than 100 m (328 ft): 1

This is a list of the tallest buildings in Windsor, Ontario, the second-largest city in Southwestern Ontario, Canada. Windsor lies directly across the border from Detroit, Michigan, a metropolitan area of over 4 million people. It the largest city in Canada that directly borders the United States. This partly explains the larger presence of tall buildings compared to Windsor's neighbours, St. Catherines and Kitchener; laxer gambling and drinking laws in Canada compared to the United States contributes to economic activity in the city.

Windsor has 7 buildings that stand taller than 70 m (230 ft). The tallest building in the city is the 27-storey, 111 m (364 ft) Caesars Windsor Augustus Tower. The second-tallest building in the city is Victoria Park Place Condominium, standing at 88.7 m (291 ft) tall with 31 storeys.

Unlike many similar sized cities in Ontario and elsewhere in Canada, Windsor has not seen a boom in residential high-rise construction starting from the early 2010s. As of 2025, the city has no structures under construction or proposed. The most recent development in Windsor is Caesars Windsor Augustus Tower at 111 m (364 ft) and 27 floors, completed in 2008.

== Buildings ==
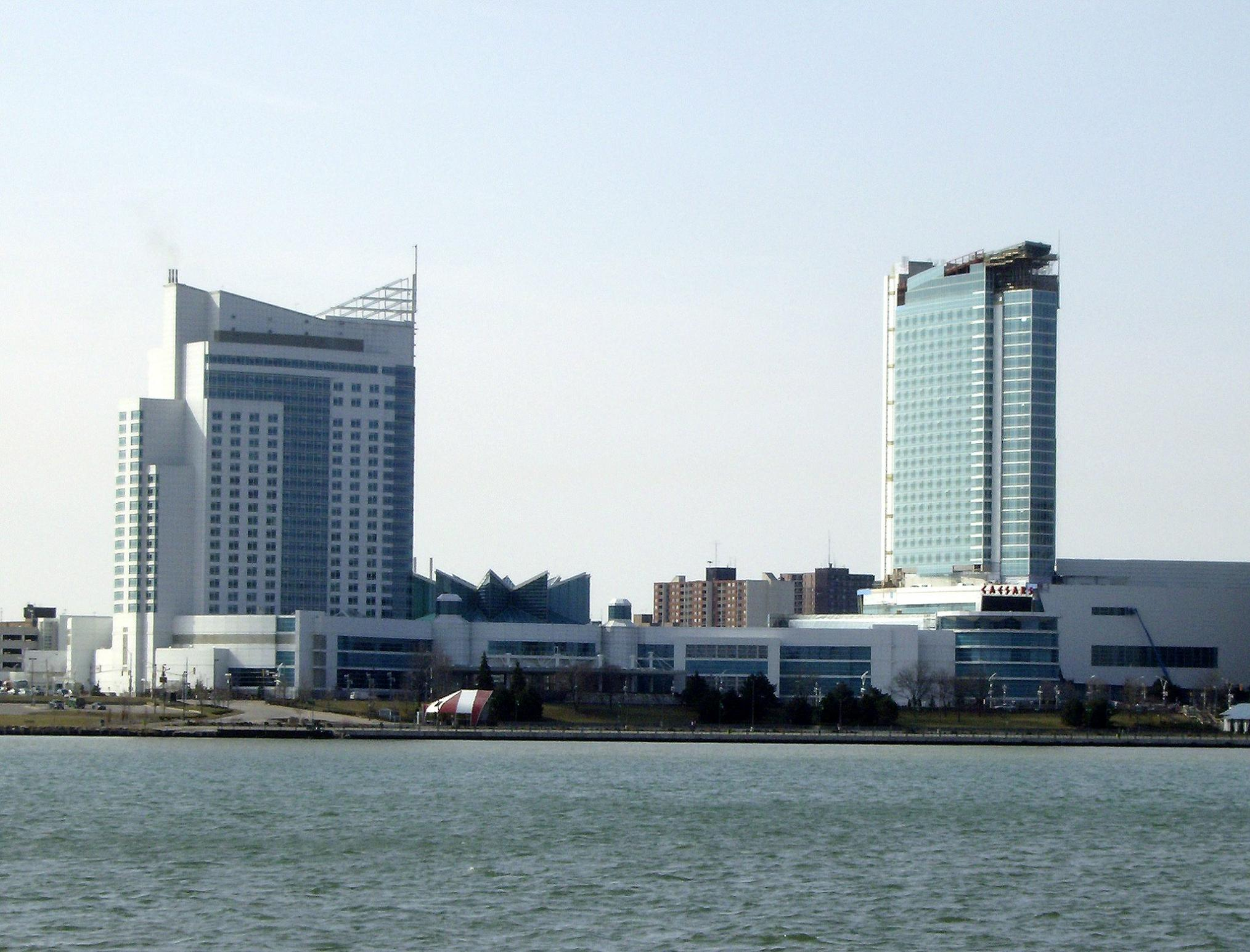
The two towers of the Caesars Windsor casino hotel resort.

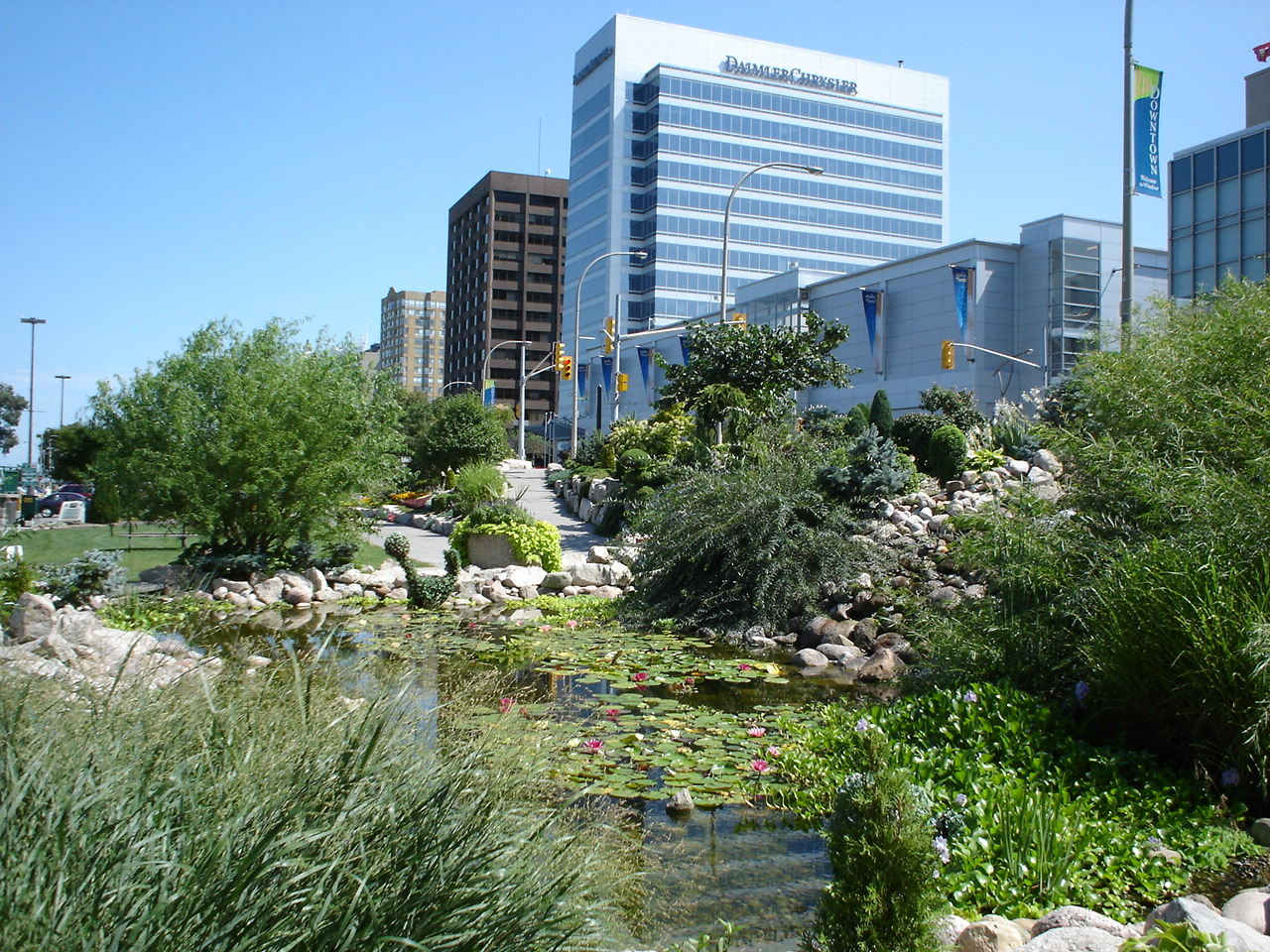
The headquarters of Chrysler Canada in downtown Windsor.

This list ranks buildings in Windsor that stand at least 50 m (164 ft) tall, based on CTBUH height measurement standards. This includes spires and architectural details but does not include antenna masts.

Rank	Building	Address	Height	Storeys	Completed
1	Caesars Windsor Augustus Tower	377 Riverside Drive East	111 m (364 ft)	27	2008
2	Victoria Park Place	150 Park Street West	88.7 m (291 ft)	31	1979
3	Caesars Windsor Forum Tower	377 Riverside Drive East	82.9 m (272 ft)	21	1998
4	Best Western Plus Waterfront Hotel	277 Riverside Drive West	79 m (259 ft)	21	1983
5=	Royal Windsor Terrace	380 Pelissier Street	75 m (246 ft)	25	1969
5=	Solidarity Towers	8888 Riverside Drive East	75 m (246 ft)	26	1975
7	Canada Building	374 Ouellette Avenue	70 m (230 ft)	14	1928
8	Ouellette Manor	920 Ouellette Avenue	66 m (217 ft)	24	1970
9	Westcourt Place	251 Goyeau Street	64 m (210 ft)	21	1975
10	Radisson Riverfront Hotel Windsor	333 Riverside Drive West	61 m (200 ft)	19	1989
11	The Portofino	1225 Riverside Drive West	60 m (200 ft)	17	2006
12	One Riverside Drive	1 Riverside Drive West	59 m (194 ft)	14	2002
13	Ouellette Towers	737 Ouellette Avenue	58 m (190 ft)	20	1978
14	Regency Colonnade	1545 Ouellette Avenue	57 m (187 ft)	13	-
15	Raymond DesMarais Manor	255 Riverside Drive East	55 m (180 ft)	20	1974

== See also ==
- Canadian architecture
- List of tallest buildings in Ontario
