= List of cities in the United States with the most skyscrapers =

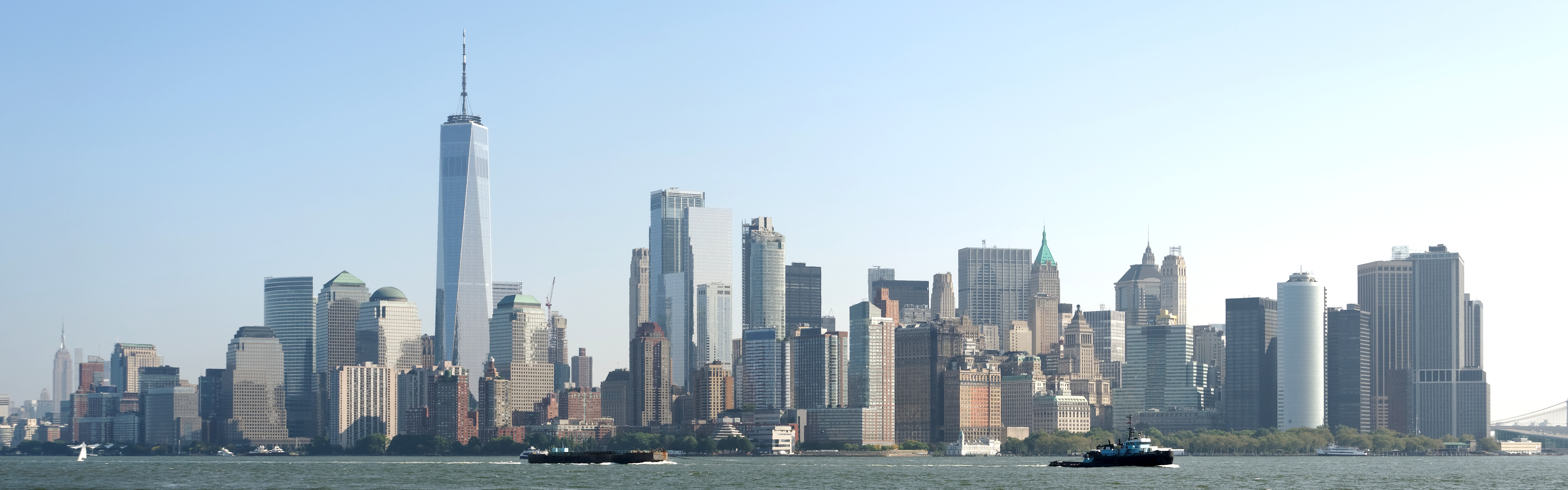
New York City, with over 300 skyscrapers, has the most in the United States, North America, and the Western Hemisphere.

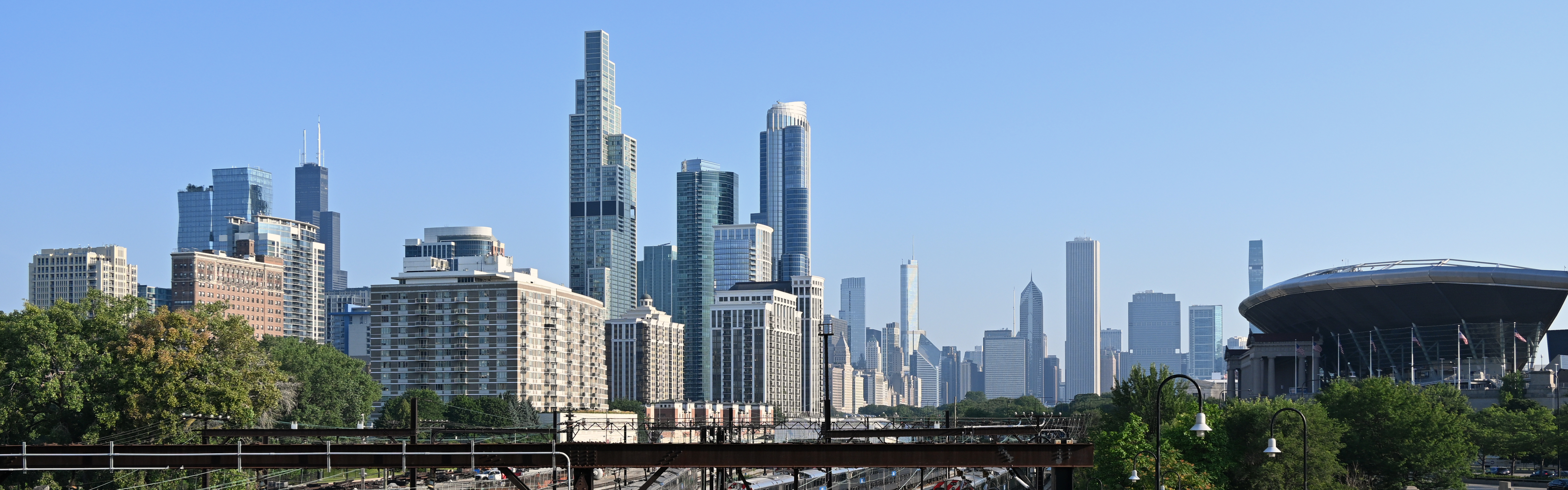
Chicago's skyline, with 137 skyscrapers, is the largest in the Midwest. It has been the second largest skyline in the country since the early 20th century.

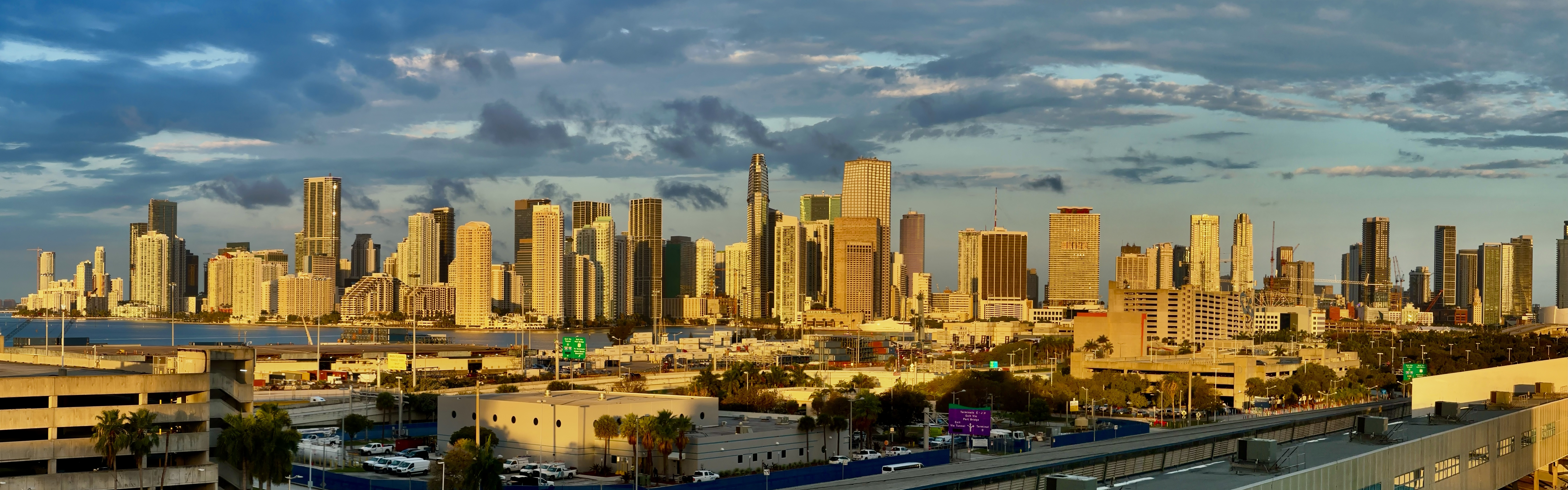
Miami, the city with the third most skyscrapers in the U.S., has 69 skyscrapers within city limits, and 19 more in Miami's metropolitan area.

As of 2026, the United States has over 900 skyscrapers, defined as buildings taller than 492 feet (150 m), across 56 cities. It has the second highest number of skyscrapers out of any country, after China. For most of the 20th century, the largest skylines in the United States were also the largest in the world; currently, the country has five of the 60 cities with the most skyscrapers. The only two cities in the United States with more than 100 skyscrapers are New York City and Chicago. Miami has over 65 skyscrapers, with Houston and Los Angeles with over 30 skyscrapers. Boston, Dallas, Jersey City, San Francisco, and Seattle each have between 20 and 30 skyscrapers.

With the development of the earliest skyscrapers in the late 19th century, New York City and Chicago emerged as the two cities with the largest volume of high-rises in the country. They have continued to maintain that status until the present day. New York City is the city with the most skyscrapers, having over 320, more than twice as many as Chicago. It has the third-most skyscrapers in the world, after Hong Kong and Shenzhen. New York City makes up approximately one third of all buildings taller than 492 ft (150 m) in the United States. Chicago, with 137 skyscrapers, has the second-largest skyline in the country. Together, New York City and Chicago comprise about half of all skyscrapers in the country.

As more skyscrapers were built across the United States, the size of a city's skyline often reflected the city's relative importance. Large cities in the Northeast and the Midwest saw a construction boom during the Roaring Twenties, mainly from the mid-1920s to early 1930s. In addition to New York City and Chicago, high-rise construction hotspots in the early 20th century included Boston, Detroit, Philadelphia, and Pittsburgh, which were all in the ten largest cities by population during the 1920s. The Great Depression severely halted skyscraper development across much of the country from the 1930s to mid-1950s. When constructing new skyscrapers became feasible again, cities that underwent major construction booms included many in the Southern and Western United States, particularly Atlanta, Dallas, Houston, and Los Angeles. However, despite Los Angeles surpassing Chicago in population in 1982, its skyline remains comfortably smaller than Chicago's today.

Construction slowed down again in the early 1990s, and resumed in major cities during the 2000s. The Great Recession dampened the construction of new skyscrapers for several years following its onset in 2008. New York City maintained its dominant position, entering an unprecedented skyscraper boom in the mid-2010s. Whereas skyscrapers were previously built mostly for office space in the 20th century, their development has shifted to being mainly for residential and mixed-use purposes. This has led to a dramatic growth in the number of tall buildings in a number of cities, most notably Austin, Nashville, and Miami. In particular, Miami's skyline grew rapidly from residential condominiums in the 2000s, and later from the 2010s onwards, becoming the city with the third-largest skyline in the United States. The 21st century has also seen the emergence of skylines in suburban cities, such as that of Bellevue, Jersey City, and Sunny Isles Beach, as well as multiple skyscraper clusters outside of Manhattan in New York City, including Downtown Brooklyn and Long Island City.

== Cities with the most skyscrapers ==
The ranking of the cities with the most skyscrapers depends on the height used for the definition of a skyscraper, as some cities may have more buildings above a certain height than another city, but fewer buildings when another height is chosen. For example, Honolulu and San Diego have many high-rise buildings between 300 and 500 ft (91 and 152 m) tall, but very few buildings exceeding 500 ft in height. Thus, they rank higher if a lower cutoff is used for a skyscraper.

=== Measured in feet ===
The United States uses U.S. customary units as its predominant system of measurement. Many Americans prefer to use a round number in feet as a cutoff point. This table ranks cities and unincorporated areas in the United States by the number of completed buildings taller than 300 feet (91.4 m) within city limits. It includes every city in the United States with at least 10 buildings taller than that height. Figures in 400 feet (122 m), 500 feet (152 m), and 600 feet (183 m) are provided as well. If two or more cities have the same number of 300-foot buildings, they are then ranked by the number of 400 ft buildings.

Numbers that are uncited are directly supported by the infobox or tables in the linked article. 500 feet (152 m) is close to 492 feet (150 m), a height commonly used for the definition of a skyscraper, including by the Council of Vertical Urbanism and on the list of cities with the most skyscrapers.

Rank	City	State	Image	Number of buildings			
Rank	City	State	Image	≥300 ft (91 m)	≥400 ft (122 m)	≥500 ft (152 m)	≥600 ft (183 m)
1	New York City	New York		1,091 (Note: This figure was obtained using the "Skyscraper Diagram" or "Timeline Diagram" function on SkyscraperPage by setting the required height. Only the "built" and "high-rise buildings" options selected for structure type and status respectively. SkyscraperPage may include buildings with estimated heights.)	572	304	154
2	Chicago	Illinois		409	237	127	57
3	Miami	Florida		166	113	65	24
4	Houston	Texas		153	72	41	20
5	Atlanta	Georgia		125	46	18	12
6	San Francisco	California		124	61	24	11
7	Los Angeles	California		107	52	31	17
8	Honolulu	Hawaii		98 (Note: This figure was obtained by querying the "Explore Data" function on The Skyscraper Center.)	24	0	0
9	Philadelphia	Pennsylvania		86	34	16	9
10	Dallas	Texas		85	33	20	11
11	Seattle	Washington		84	53	21	8
12	Boston	Massachusetts		73	40	23	10
13	Austin	Texas		66	32	19	8
14	Jersey City	New Jersey		60	34	20	8
15	Las Vegas (Note: Many of the skyscrapers included in this figure are part of the Las Vegas Strip, which is in the unincorporated towns of Paradise and Winchester, instead of the city limits of Las Vegas. However, the CTBUH, SkyscraperPage, and the linked article considers them to be in Las Vegas.)	Nevada		58	41	16	9
16	San Diego	California		49	23	1	0
17	Denver	Colorado		49	19	8	5
18	Minneapolis	Minnesota		41	22	10	4
19	Charlotte	North Carolina		40	17	8	5
20	Nashville	Tennessee		40	17	4	1
21	Detroit	Michigan		39	15	8	3
22	Sunny Isles Beach	Florida		35	27	17	9
23	Baltimore	Maryland		35	8	3	0
24	Pittsburgh	Pennsylvania		34	17	10	5
25	Fort Lauderdale	Florida		30	9	0	0
26	New Orleans	Louisiana		26	12	4	2
27	Phoenix	Arizona		24	3	0	0
28	Aventura	Florida		23	2	0	0
29	Cleveland	Ohio		21	11	5	3
30	Miami Beach	Florida		18	11	3	0
31	Columbus	Ohio		18	10	5	1
32	Kansas City	Missouri		18	9	3	1
33	Oakland	California		18	2	0	0
34	Bellevue	Washington		17	8	2	2
35	Cincinnati	Ohio		17	7	2	1
36	Portland	Oregon		17	6	4	0
37	Tampa	Florida		16	8	4	0
38	Atlantic City	New Jersey		16	6	2	1
39	Salt Lake City	Utah		16	3	0	0
40	Milwaukee	Wisconsin		15	7	4	1
41	St. Louis	Missouri		14	5	3	0
42	Saint Paul	Minnesota		14	3	0	0
43	Newark	New Jersey		13	2	0	0
44	Tulsa	Oklahoma		12	6	4	2
45	Indianapolis	Indiana		12	6	3	1
46	San Antonio	Texas		12	5	1	0
47	Orlando	Florida		12	5	0	0
48	Louisville	Kentucky		12	4	2	0
49	St. Petersburg	Florida		12	4	1	0
50	Sacramento	California		12	2	0	0
51	Fort Worth	Texas		11	6	3	0
52	Hartford	Connecticut		11	4	3	0
53	Richmond	Virginia		10	3	0	0
54	Rosslyn	Virginia		10	0	0	0

=== Measured in meters ===
The number of skyscrapers may also be measured using the metric system. This allows for easier comparison between American cities and cities outside of the United States. This table includes every city and unincorporated territory in the United States by the number of completed buildings taller than 150 meters (492 ft) as of October 2025,. This height is commonly used for the definition of a skyscraper, including by the Council of Vertical Urbanism and on the list of cities with the most skyscrapers. It includes every city with at least one skyscraper taller than 150 m (492 ft). Figures for 100 m (328 ft), 200 m (656 ft), and 300 m (984 ft) buildings are provided as well.

Numbers that are uncited are directly supported by the infobox or tables in the linked article. If two or more cities have the same number of 150 m (492 ft) buildings, they are then ranked by the number of 100 m (328 ft) buildings. The 150 m column is highlighted blue for visibility.

Rank	City	State	Image	Number of buildings			
Rank	City	State	Image	≥100 m (328 ft)	≥150 m (492 ft)	≥200 m (656 ft)	≥300 m (984 ft)
1	New York City	New York		897	324	101	18
2	Chicago	Illinois		356	137	38	7
3	Miami	Florida		150	69	9	0
4	Houston	Texas		115	40	16	2
5	Los Angeles	California		88	32	13	2
6	San Francisco	California		100	27	5	1
7	Boston	Massachusetts		59	26	6	0
8	Seattle	Washington		75	22	5	0
9	Dallas	Texas		58	20	6	0
10	Jersey City	New Jersey		49	20	6	0
11	Austin	Texas		53	19	6	1
12	Atlanta	Georgia		98	18	11	1
13	Philadelphia	Pennsylvania		65	18	7	1
14	Sunny Isles Beach	Florida		30	17	2	0
15	Las Vegas	Nevada		55	16	2	0
16	Minneapolis	Minnesota		31	11	4	0
17	Pittsburgh	Pennsylvania		27	10	2	0
18	Detroit	Michigan		28	9	2	0
19	Denver	Colorado		41	8	3	0
20	Charlotte	North Carolina		29	8	3	0
21	Cleveland	Ohio		19	5	3	0
22	Columbus	Ohio		15	5	0	0
23	Nashville	Tennessee		31	4	0	0
24	Baltimore	Maryland		25	4	0	0
25	New Orleans	Louisiana		23	4	1	0
26	Milwaukee	Wisconsin		14	4	0	0
27	Tampa	Florida		11	4	0	0
28	Portland	Oregon		10	4	0	0
29	Tulsa	Oklahoma		10	4	0	0
30	San Diego	California		41	3	0	0
31	Fort Lauderdale	Florida		21	3	0	0
32	Miami Beach	Florida		18	3	0	0
33	Cincinnati	Ohio		12	3	1	0
34	St. Louis	Missouri		12	3	0	0
35	Indianapolis	Indiana		9	3	1	0
36	Fort Worth	Texas		8	3	0	0
37	Hartford	Connecticut		7	3	0	0
38	Atlantic City	New Jersey		14	2	1	0
39	Kansas City	Missouri		14	2	0	0
40	Louisville	Kentucky		11	2	0	0
41	Bellevue	Washington		11	2	0	0
42	Oklahoma City	Oklahoma		7	2	1	0
43	Fort Lee	New Jersey		6	2	0	0
44	Jacksonville	Florida		6	2	0	0
45	Sandy Springs	Georgia		3	2	0	0
46	St. Petersburg	Florida		10	1	0	0
47	San Antonio	Texas		9	1	0	0
48	Buffalo	New York		5	1	0	0
49	Des Moines	Iowa		5	1	0	0
50	Little Rock	Arkansas		5	1	0	0
51	Raleigh	North Carolina		5	1	0	0
52	Hallandale Beach	Florida		4	1	0	0
53	Mobile	Alabama		3	1	0	0
54	Omaha	Nebraska		3	1	0	0
55	Albany	New York		2	1	0	0
56	Virginia Beach	Virginia		2	1	0	0

== Metropolitan areas with the most skyscrapers ==
Panorama of New York City/Jersey City skyline

City boundaries may exclude buildings in the same metropolitan area from being included in its list of skyscrapers. This table ranks metropolitan statistical areas (MSAs) in the United States by the amount of 300 foot (91 m) buildings. The "city" column includes every city in a metropolitan area with at least one 300-foot building. The final column shows the number of such buildings in a metropolitan area for every million inhabitants.

Rank	Metropolitan area	State	Image	City (300 ft buildings)	Total	Population (2024)	300 ft buildings per million (Note: Calculated by dividing the number of buildings with the population, and then multiplying the result by a million. Rounded to the nearest decimal point.)
1	New York City	New York; New Jersey		New York City (1,091); Jersey City (60); Newark (13); Fort Lee (7); White Plains (5); Guttenberg (3); New Rochelle (3); Cliffside Park (2); North Bergen (1); West New York (1); Brookhaven (1)	1,187	19,940,274	59.5
2	Chicago	Illinois; Indiana		Chicago (409); Itasca (1); Oakbrook Terrace (1)	411	9,408,576	43.7
3	Miami	Florida		Miami (166); Sunny Isles Beach (35); Fort Lauderdale (30); Aventura (23); Miami Beach (18); Hollywood (7); Hallandale Beach (6); Bal Harbour (4); West Palm Beach (4); Kendall (2); North Miami Beach (2); Boca Raton (1); Coral Gables (1); Riviera Beach (1)	300	6,457,988	46.4
4	Houston	Texas		Houston (151); Galveston (3); The Woodlands (2); Pasadena (1)	157	7,796,182	20.1
5	San Francisco	California		San Francisco (124); Oakland (18) Foster City (1) South San Fracisco (1) Emeryville (1)	145	4,648,486	30.5
6	Atlanta	Georgia		Atlanta (125); Dunwoody (4); Sandy Springs (4); Brookhaven (2); Vinings (2)	137	6,411,149	21.4
7	Los Angeles	California		Los Angeles (107); Century City(7); Long Beach (4); El Segundo (2); Irvine (2); Burbank (1); Glendale (1); Santa Monica (1); West Hollywood (1)	126	12,927,614	9.2
8	Dallas–Fort Worth	Texas		Dallas (85); Fort Worth (11); Irving (3); Plano (3)	102	8,344,032	12.2
9	Seattle	Washington		Seattle (84); Bellevue (16); Tacoma (1)	101	4,145,494	24.4
10	Honolulu	Hawaii		Honolulu (98); Pearl City (2)	100	998,747	100.1
11	Philadelphia	Pennsylvania; New Jersey; Delaware		Philadelphia (86); Camden (1); Wilmington (1)	88	6,330,422	13.9
12	Boston	Massachusetts; New Hampshire		Boston (73); Cambridge (1); Everett (1)	75	5,025,517	14.9
13	Austin	Texas		Austin (65)	65	2,550,637	25.5
14	Las Vegas	Nevada		Las Vegas (58)	58	2,398,871	24.2
15	Minneapoils–Saint Paul	Minnesota		Minneapolis (41); Saint Paul (14); Bloomington (2)	57	3,757,952	15.2
16	Denver	Colorado		Denver (49); Glendale (1)	50	3,052,498	16.4
17	San Diego	California		San Diego (49)	49	3,298,799	14.9
18	Detroit	Michigan		Detroit (39); Southfield (5); Troy (1)	45	4,400,578	10.2
19	Charlotte	North Carolina		Charlotte (40)	40	2,883,370	13.9
20	Nashville	Tennessee		Nashville (40)	40	2,150,553	18.6
21	Baltimore	Maryland		Baltimore (35); Towson (1)	36	2,859,024	12.6
22	Pittsburgh	Pennsylvania		Pittsburgh (34)	34	2,429,917	14.0
23	Washington D.C.	Washington D.C. Maryland; Virginia		Rosslyn (10); Tysons (8); Bethesda (3); Washington D.C. (3); Alexandria (2); Crystal City (2); Pentagon City (2); Reston (2); Bailey's Crossroads (1)	33	6,436,489	5.1
24	Tampa	Florida		Tampa (16); St. Petersburg (12)	28	3,424,560	8.2
25	New Orleans	Louisiana		New Orleans (26); Metairie (1)	27	966,230	27.9
26	Phoenix	Arizona		Phoenix (24); Tempe (1)	25	5,186,958	4.8
27	Cleveland	Ohio		Cleveland (21)	21	2,171,877	9.7
28	St. Louis	Missouri; Illinois		St. Louis (14); Clayton (5)	19	2,811,927	6.8
29	Columbus	Ohio		Columbus (18)	18	2,225,377	8.1
30	Kansas City	Missouri; Kansas		Kansas City (18)	18	2,253,579	8.0
31	Cincinnati	Ohio; Kentucky		Cincinnati (17)	17	2,302,815	7.4
32	Portland	Oregon		Portland (17)	17	2,537,904	6.7
33	Atlantic City	New Jersey		Atlantic City (16)	16	372,989	42.9
34	Salt Lake City	Utah		Salt Lake City (16)	16	1,300,762	12.3
35	Milwaukee	Wisconsin		Milwaukee (15)	15	1,574,452	9.5
36	Indianapolis	Indiana		Indianapolis (12)	12	2,174,833	5.5
37	Louisville	Kentucky		Louisville (12)	12	1,394,234	8.6
38	Orlando	Florida		Orlando (12)	12	2,940,513	4.1
39	Sacramento	California		Sacramento (12)	12	2,463,127	4.9
40	San Antonio	Texas		San Antonio (12)	12	2,763,006	4.3
41	Tulsa	Oklahoma		Tulsa (12)	12	1,059,803	11.3
42	Richmond	Virginia		Richmond (10)	10	1,370,165	7.3

== Graphs ==
Number of skyscrapers taller than 492 feet (150 m) in the five cities with the most skyscrapers in the United States. Click on the legend to toggle a city on or off. View chart definition.

== See also ==
- List of cities in Australia with the most skyscrapers
- List of cities in Canada with the most skyscrapers
- List of cities with the most skyscrapers
- List of tallest buildings in the United States
- List of tallest buildings by U.S. state and territory
