= List of countries with the most skyscrapers =

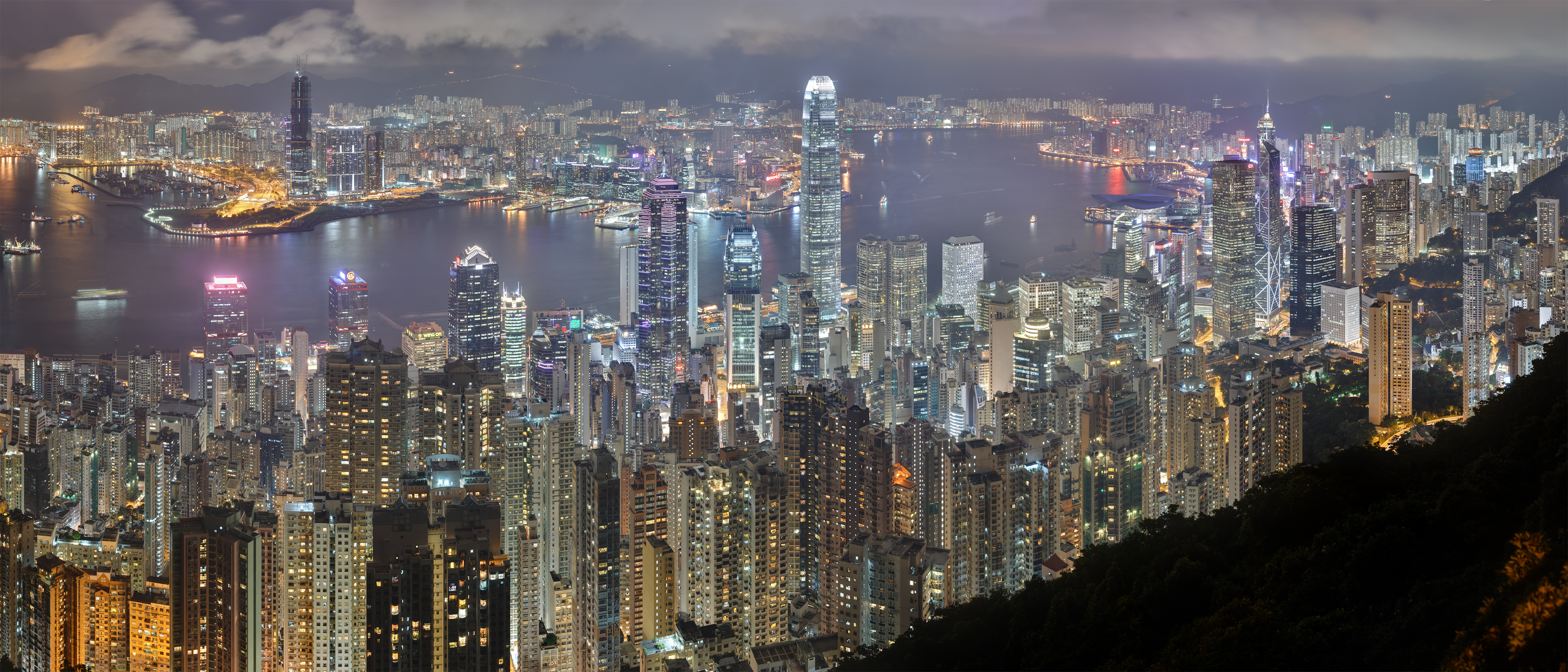
China is the country with the most skyscrapers (Hong Kong pictured)

A skyscraper is generally defined as any building that is more than 150 metres (492 ft) tall and has more than 40 storeys. The following is a list of countries with the most skyscrapers. Other structures like observation towers or lattice towers are excluded on this list. A country's tallest city is its city proper with the greatest cumulative height of such buildings.

== List of countries by number of completed skyscrapers ==
The following is a list of the top 50 countries with the most completed buildings over 150 metres (492 ft) tall, as of September 2026.

Rank	Country	Number of skyscrapers			Tallest city
Rank	Country	Total	200 m+	300 m+	Tallest city
1	China	3,574	1,353	132	Hong Kong
2	United States	935	257	33	New York City
3	India	416	98	2	Mumbai
4	United Arab Emirates	366	162	38	Dubai
5	Malaysia	329	83	7	Kuala Lumpur
6	Japan	287	55	2	Tokyo
7	South Korea	281	80	7	Seoul
8	Canada	190	47	0	Toronto
9	Australia	166	62	2	Melbourne
10	Thailand	146	42	3	Bangkok
11	Indonesia	139	52	2	Jakarta
12	Philippines	134	44	0	Makati
13	Singapore	102	35	0	—N/a
14	Brazil	81	6	0	Balneário Camboriú
15	Turkey	79	16	1	Istanbul
16	Taiwan	77	12	2	Taipei
17	Russia	75	29	7	Moscow
18	Panama	68	25	0	Panama City
19	Qatar	58	30	3	Doha
20	Mexico	56	14	1	Mexico City
21	United Kingdom	53	13	1	London
22	Saudi Arabia	49	26	5	Riyadh
23	Israel	45	7	0	Tel Aviv
24	Vietnam	44	9	2	Ho Chi Minh City
25	France	28	5	0	Courbevoie
26	Colombia	25	3	0	Bogotá
27	Germany	23	6	0	Frankfurt
28	Bahrain	21	9	0	Manama
29	Kuwait	20	10	4	Kuwait City
30	North Korea	18	7	0	Pyongyang
31	Sri Lanka	17	5	0	Colombo
32	Poland	16	6	1	Warsaw
33	Spain	13	4	0	Madrid
34	Argentina	11	1	0	Buenos Aires
35	Kazakhstan	9	1	1	Astana
35	Azerbaijan	9	1	0	Baku
35	Netherlands	9	1	0	Rotterdam
38	Italy	8	3	0	Milan
38	Egypt	8	1	1	Cairo
40	Cambodia	6	4	0	Phnom Penh
40	South Africa	6	2	0	Johannesburg
42	Austria	5	2	0	Vienna
42	Venezuela	5	2	0	Caracas
44	Lebanon	4	0	0	Beirut
44	New Zealand	4	0	0	Auckland
44	Tanzania	4	0	0	Dar es Salaam
47	Kenya	3	1	0	Nairobi
47	Pakistan	3	1	0	Karachi
47	Sweden	3	1	0	Gothenburg
47	Cyprus	3	0	0	Limassol
