= List of tallest buildings in Nuremberg =

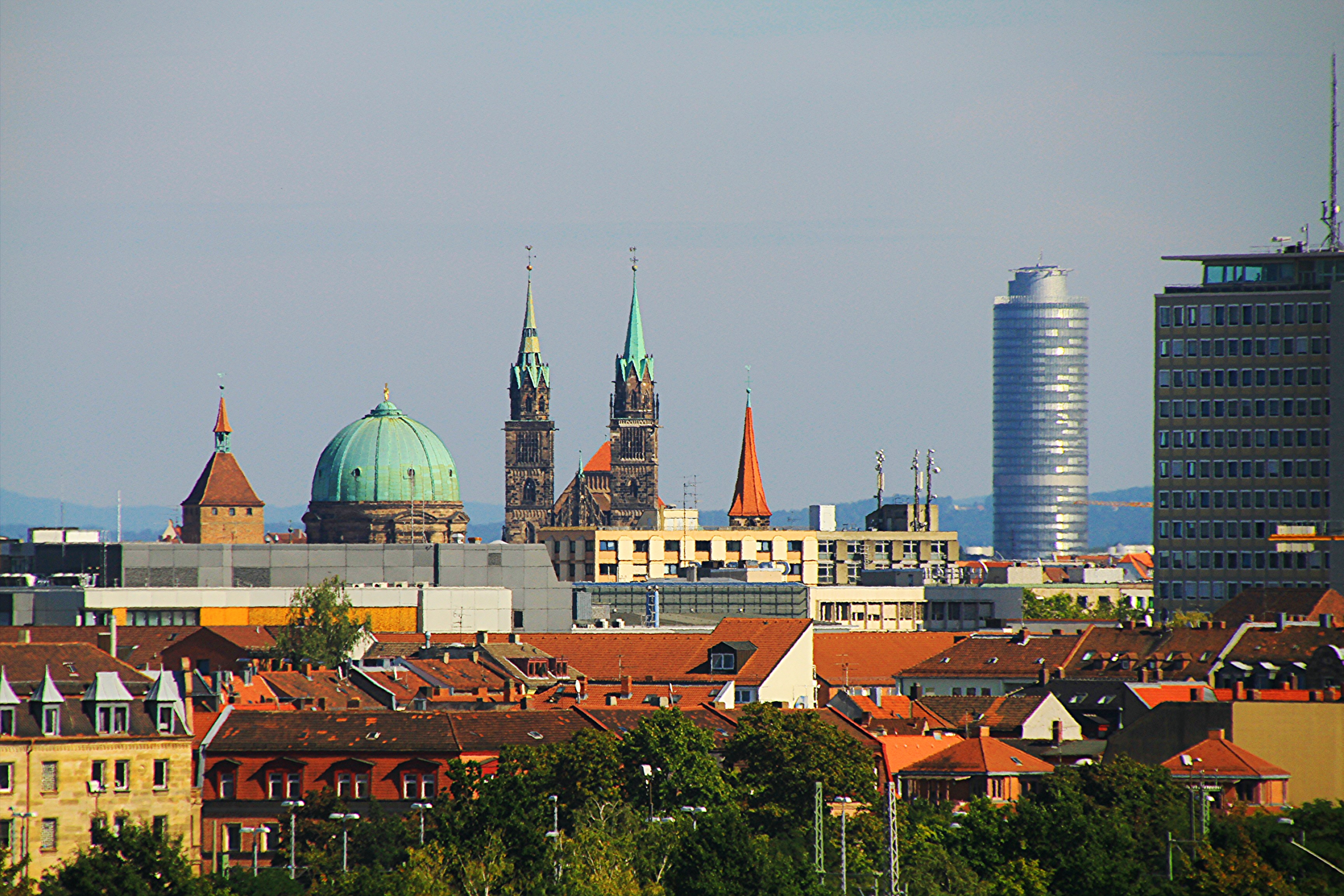
Nuremberg: Old and new towers

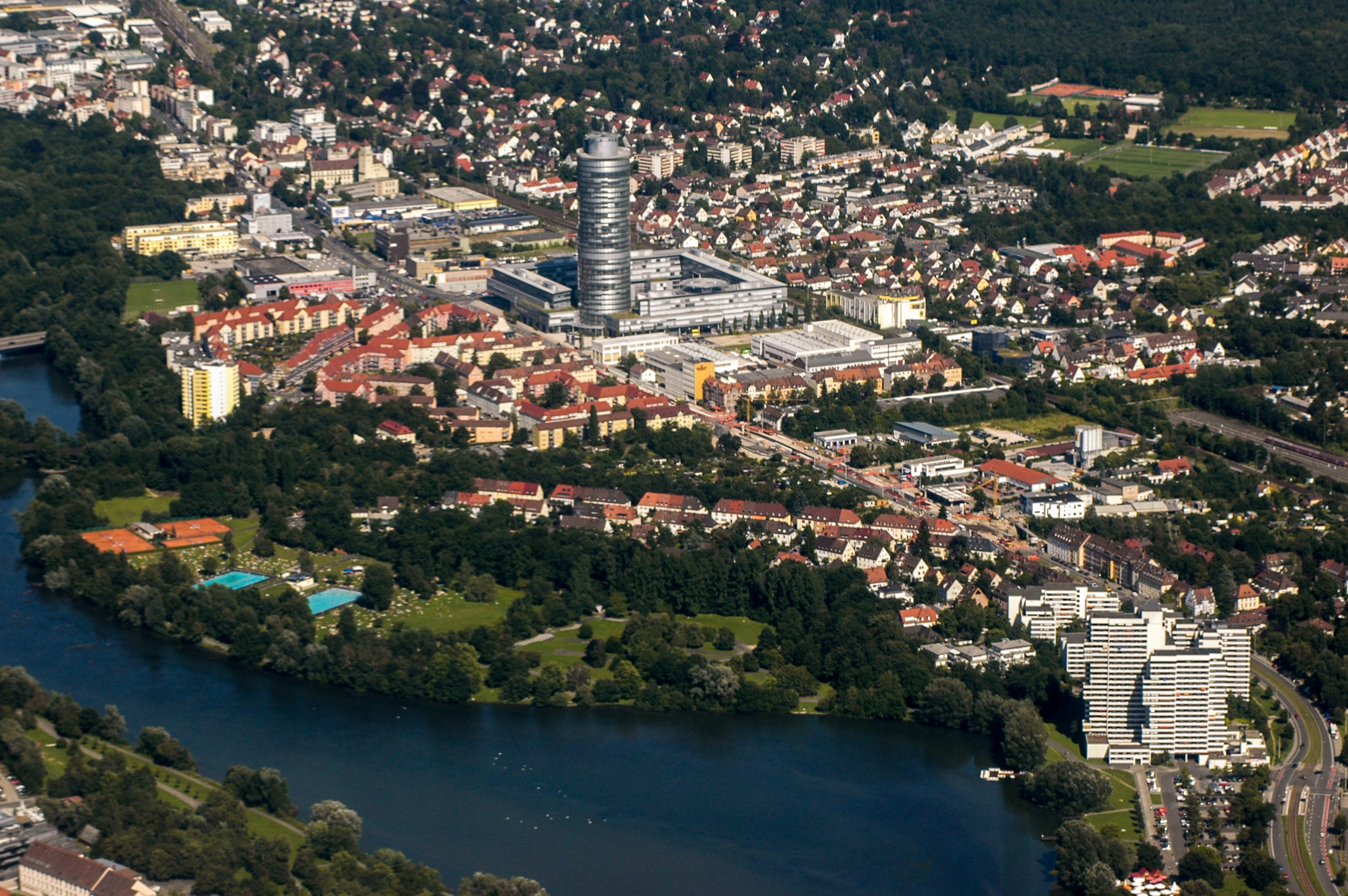
Aerial photography of Wöhrd and Mögeldorf in Nürnberg, Germany

This list of tallest buildings in Nuremberg ranks high-rise buildings and important landmarks that reach a height of 50 meters (164 feet). The tallest structure in the city is by far the 292-meter-high Fernmeldeturm Nürnberg, a telecommunication tower built in 1980.

Nuremberg is characterized above all by its medieval old town with churches towers and domes. To protect the cityscape, very few high-rise buildings have been built to date.

The tallest building in the city is the 135-meter-high Business Tower, the second tallest building in the Free State of Bavaria after Uptown München in Munich.

Rank	Name	Image	Height m (ft)	Floors	Year completed	Use / Note
	Fernmeldeturm Nürnberg		292 m (958 ft)		1980	Telecommunications tower, Tallest structure in Nuremberg.
1	Business Tower Nürnberg		135 m (443 ft)	34	2000	Tallest skyscraper in Nuremberg and second tallest in the state of Bavaria. Height to tip 163 m (535 ft)
	St. Lorenz, Nuremberg		81 m (266 ft)		15th century	
2	Bundesagentur für Arbeit		80.2 m (263 ft)	18	1973	Federal Employment Agency
3	Norikus 1		80 m (262 ft)	22	1972	Residential
	St. Sebaldus Church		75 m (246 ft)		13th century	
	Christus Church		73.5 m (241 ft)		1894	
	Friedenskirche Nürnberg		65 m (213 ft)		1928	
4	Hochhaus Einsteinring 6–9		64.9 m (213 ft)	21	1971	Residential
5	Hochhaus Neuselsbrunn 32		62.5 m (205 ft)	21	1965	Residential
5	Hochhaus Neuselsbrunn 53		62.5 m (205 ft)	21	1965	Residential
5	Hochhaus Neuselsbrunn 54		62.5 m (205 ft)	21	1965	Residential
8	Seetor City Campus Tower		60 m (197 ft)	18	2023	Residential
	Reformations-Gedächtnis-Kirche Nürnberg		58 m (190 ft)		1938	
9	Hochhaus Glogauer Straße 11		56.6 m (186 ft)	17		Residential
10	HDI Hochhaus		56 m (184 ft)	15	1991	Seat of HDI
10	Plärrerhochhaus		56 m (184 ft)	15	1953	Administration building of Städtische Werke Nürnberg
12	Hochhaus Planetenring 25		55.9 m (183 ft)	17		Residential
13	Hochhaus Gartenstadt		54.5 m (179 ft)	18	1971	Residential
14	Hochhaus Creglinger Straße 62		54.3 m (178 ft)	17		Residential
14	Hochhaus Insinger Straße 54		54.3 m (178 ft)	17		Residential
16	Tafelhof Palais Turm I		53 m (174 ft)	15	2021	Hotel
16	Hochhaus Hainstraße 25		53 m (174 ft)	17	1976	Residential
18	Hochhaus Weltenburger Straße 97		52.8 m (173 ft)	16		Residential
19	Grundig Tower I		52.3 m (172 ft)	17	1970	Headquarters of Grundig
20	Hochhaus Wettersteinstraße 51–53		52 m (171 ft)	17		Residential
20	UmweltHaus		52 m (171 ft)	13	2023	Seat of Umweltbank
22	Hochhaus Schultheißallee 5		51.9 m (170 ft)	17	1968	Residential
23	Merian Forum		51.6 m (169 ft)	13	2002	Office
24	Hochhaus der Fränkischen Überlandwerke		51 m (167 ft)	14	1966	Seat of N-ERGIE
25	Norikus 2		51 m (167 ft)	17	1972	Residential
26	Hochhaus Hornfischstraße 4		50 m (164 ft)	14		Residential
26	Hochhaus Schöpfstraße 33		50 m (164 ft)	15		Residential
26	Grundig Turm II		50 m (164 ft)	16	1970	Office

== More high-rise buildings in the region ==
Rank	Name	Image	Height m (ft)	Floors	Year completed	Use / Note	City
1	Langer Johann		80 m (262 ft)	27	1973	Residential	Erlangen
2	Am Europakanal 36		~70 m (230 ft)	24		Residential	Erlangen
2	Am Europakanal 6		70 m (230 ft)	24		Residential	Erlangen
4	Am Europakanal 4		~62 m (203 ft)	21		Residential	Erlangen
5	Siemens-Hochhaus (Glaspalast)		62 m (203 ft)	17	1962	Seat of Siemens AG	Erlangen
6	Neues Rathaus (Erlangen)		61 m (200 ft)	16	2005	Town hall	Erlangen
7	Bahnhof-Center		60 m (197 ft)	16		Residential	Fürth
8	Siemens Healthineers		52 m (171 ft)			Siemens Medical technology	Erlangen
9	Sparkassen-Hochhaus		50 m (164 ft)	10		Seat of Sparkasse	Fürth

== Under construction ==
Name	Height (m)	Height (ft)	Floors	Year
IKON	65	213	17	2025
The One	51.5	169	12	2025

== Proposed ==
Name	Height (m)	Height (ft)	Floors	Year
Zweiblick Turm I	63.45	208	20	Unknown
Tor zum Tiefen Feld	57.5	189	17	Unknown
Zweiblick Turm II	57.12	187	17	Unknown
monopol491	56.3	185	18	Unknown
Hochhaus Erlanger-/Marienbergstraße	55	180	16	Unknown
Ergo-Hochhaus	52	171	14	Unknown
Hochhaus Leuschnerstraße 1	51	167	15	Unknown

== See also ==
- List of tallest buildings in Germany
- List of tallest structures in Germany
