= Canada Building (Windsor, Ontario) =

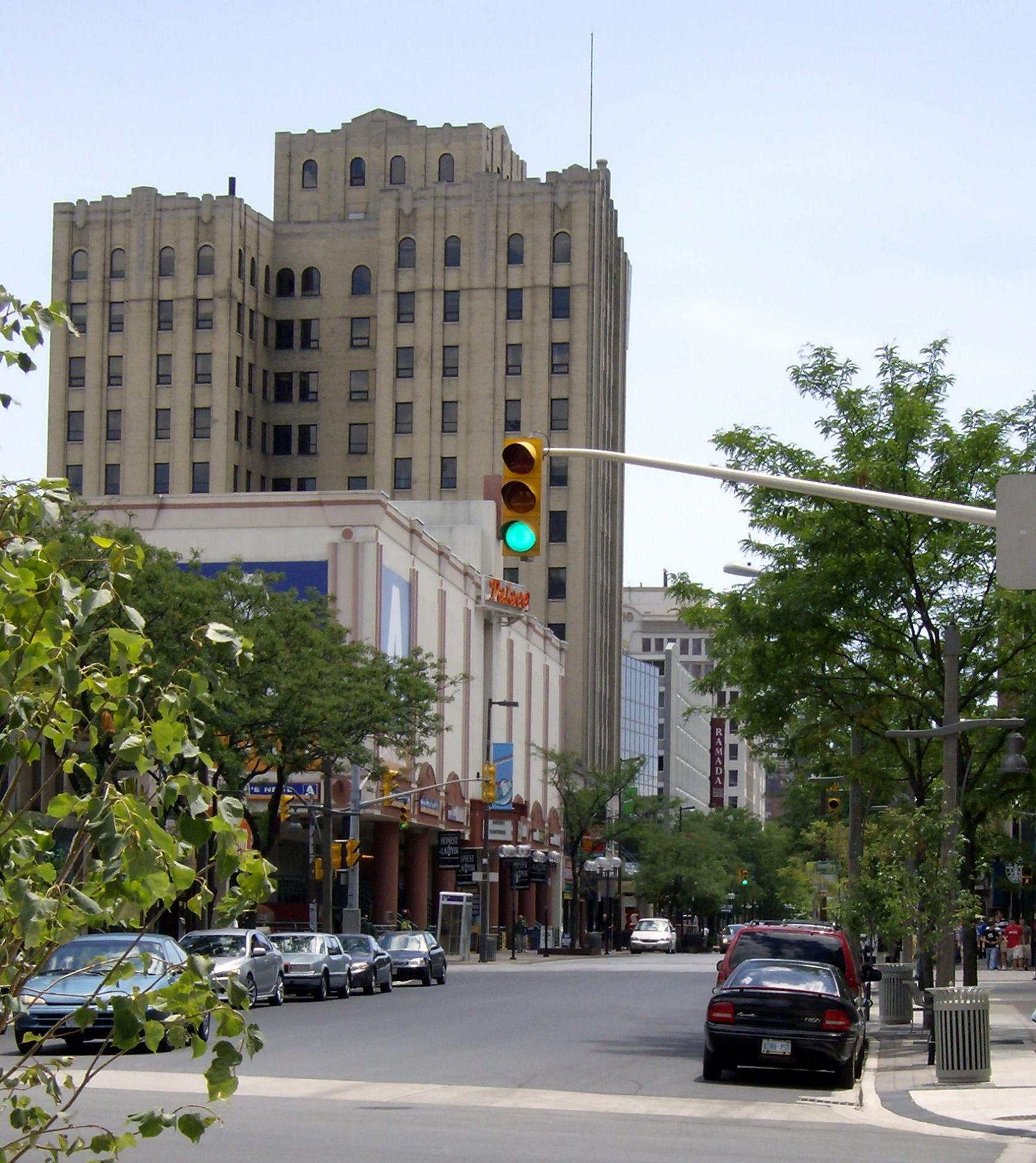
- Interactive map of the Canada Building area

General information
- Type: Office building
- Location: Windsor, Ontario, Canada, 374 Ouellette Avenue
- Coordinates: 42°19′0.6″N 83°2′17.7″W
- Completed: 1928

Technical details
- Floor count: 14
- Floor area: 89,000 sq ft (8,300 m^{2})

The Canada Building is an Art Deco office tower built in 1930 in downtown Windsor, Ontario. It stands at 14 storeys and stands on Ouellette Avenue between University Avenue and Park Street. It should not be confused with the nearby similarly designed Paul Martin Sr. Building, or the Bell Canada building, located on Goyeau Avenue, which looks nearly identical and is nearly the same in height.

The Canada Building was listed as a historic property under the Ontario Heritage Act on August 5, 2008.

As of July 2020, about a quarter of the building was used for commercial space. A redevelopment plan was announced in July 2020 for the building to have commercial space on the lowest three floors with 72 apartments in floors above.
