= One London Place =

High-rise office building in London, Ontario

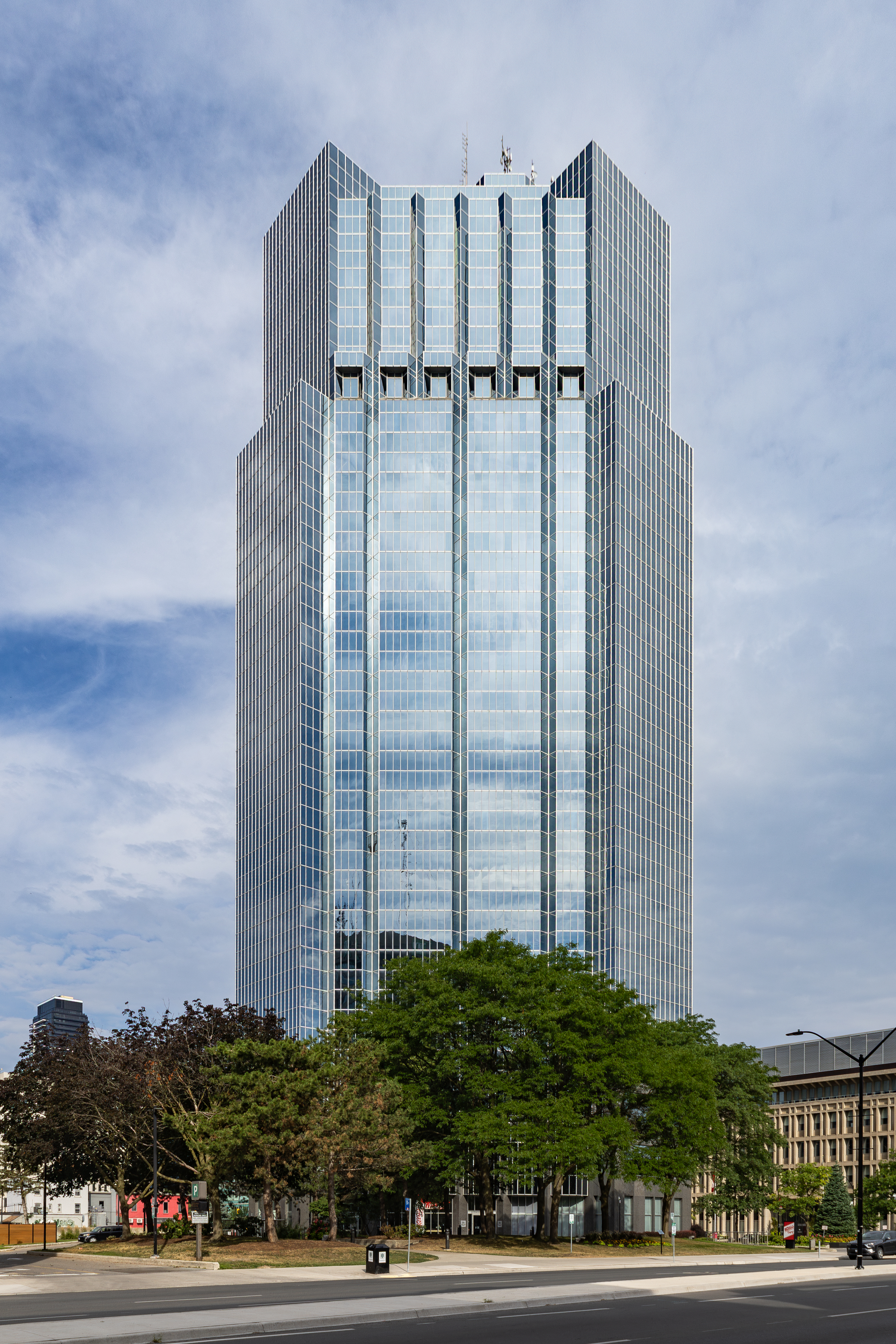
- One London Place

General information
- Status: Completed
- Type: Office
- Architectural style: Postmodern
- Location: 255 Queens Avenue; London, Ontario; N6A 5R8
- Coordinates: 42.98573°N 81.24659°W
- Completed: 1992

Height
- Roof: 113.4 m (372 ft)
- Top floor: 24

Technical details
- Floor count: 24
- Floor area: 32,516 m^{2} (350,000 sq ft)
- Lifts/elevators: 9

Design and construction
- Architects: Crang & Boake International, Toronto

One London Place is a high-rise office building in London, Ontario, Canada. Construction of the tower was completed in 1992.

Besides office space, One London Place has a restaurant, fitness centre, newsstand, Pristine Auto Detailing car wash, and 382-space underground parking lot.

== Amenities ==
The building's amenities include a restaurant, fitness centre, news stand, security, Pristine Auto Detailing car wash, shared tenant boardroom, underground parking, and administration & property management office.

The building's air is replaced with fresh air every 22 minutes, and there are individual temperature zones of approximately 600 sq ft (56 m^{2}). There are four interior columns per floor, and eight corner offices per floor. The building has 24 floors with views of the city skyline.

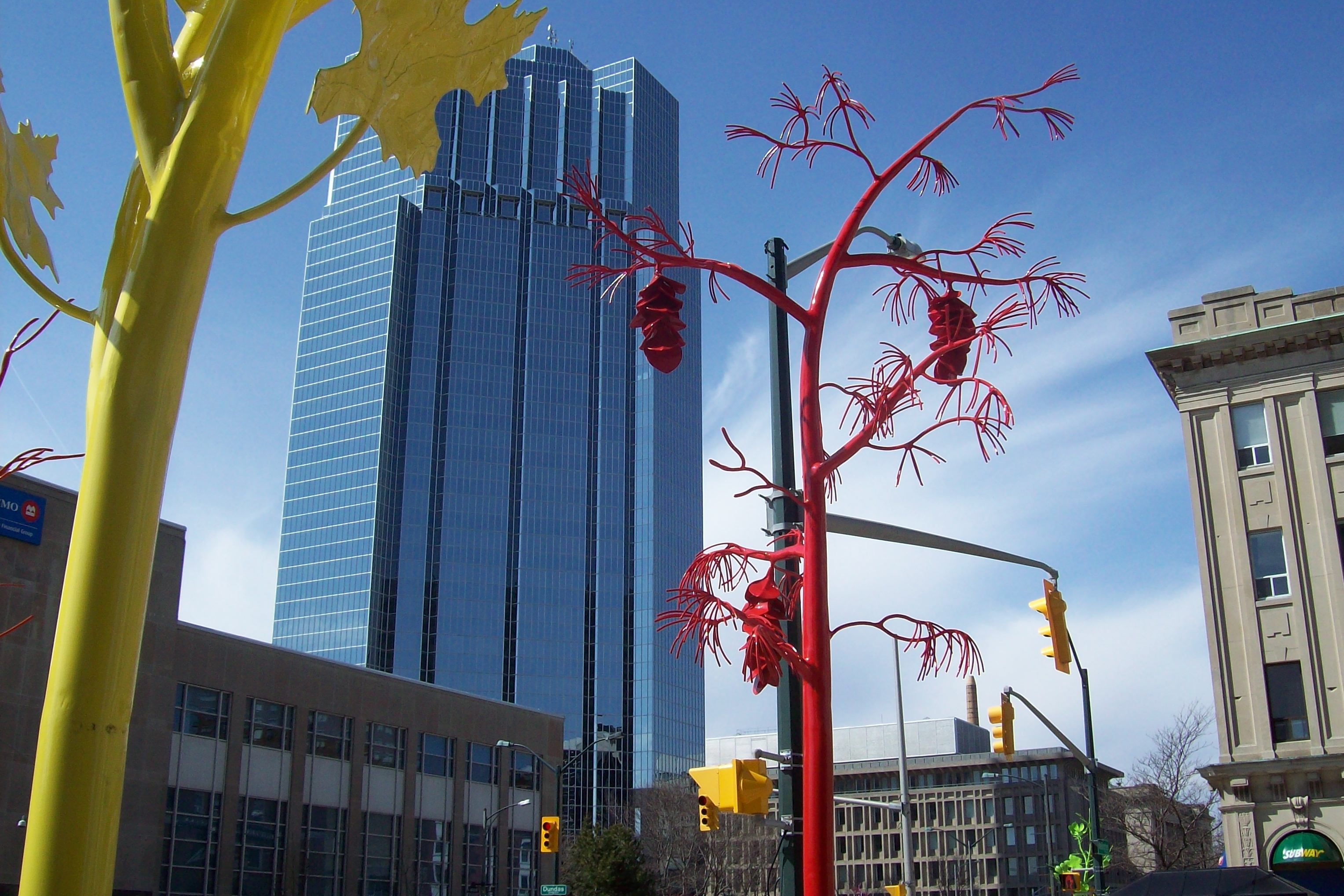
One London Place photographed from Dundas and Wellington streets during the day and night

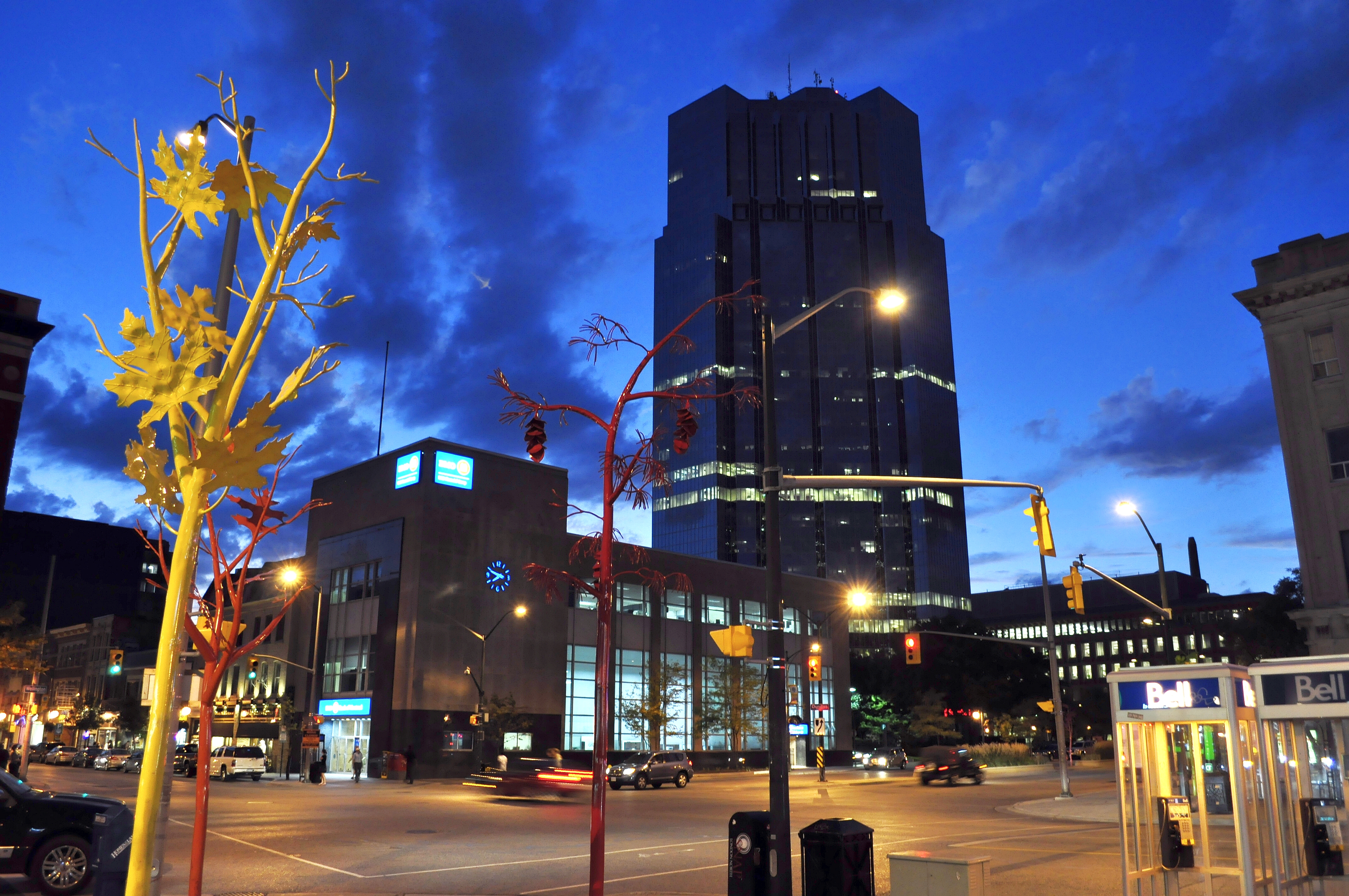
