= Pug (disambiguation) =

The pug is a breed of dog.

Pug or Pugs may also refer to:

== Science and technology ==
- Pug, several species of Eupitheciini moths
- Pugs (compiler), an interpreter and compiler for the Perl 6 programming language
- PHP User Group
- Pug, an HTML template engine; see Comparison of web template engines
- Pug impression pad, a device used to track wild animals

== Places ==
- Port Augusta Airport (IATA Airport Code: PUG), in South Australia
- Pug Hill, Central Park, New York City, US

== Fictional characters ==
- Pug, a main character in the play The Devil Is an Ass by Ben Jonson, first performed in 1616
- Pug (fictional character), a magician featured in Raymond E. Feist's series of fantasy novels
- Captain Victor "Pug" Henry, USN, central character in Herman Wouk's novels The Winds of War and War and Remembrance
- Pat "Pug" Brady, a sidekick of comic book crime fighter the Clock
- Pug is a fictional character in the MCU version of Jennifer “She Hulk” Walters.

== Other uses ==
- Pug (nickname)
- Pick-up game, in sports and video games
- Pontificia Universita Gregoriana (Pontifical Gregorian University), Rome, Italy
- Order of the Pug, a para-Masonic society
- "Pug", a song on the 1998 album Adore by The Smashing Pumpkins
- Pug (steam locomotive), British nickname for a small, 0-4-0ST (saddle tank) shunting locomotive
- Pug, a prepared earth or clay mixture sometimes made in a pugmill
- Pug Awards, a Toronto, Canada architecture award that rates buildings based on popular votes
- Puguli language (ISO 639-3 code: pug), of Burkina Faso, Africa
