= Architecture of Toronto =

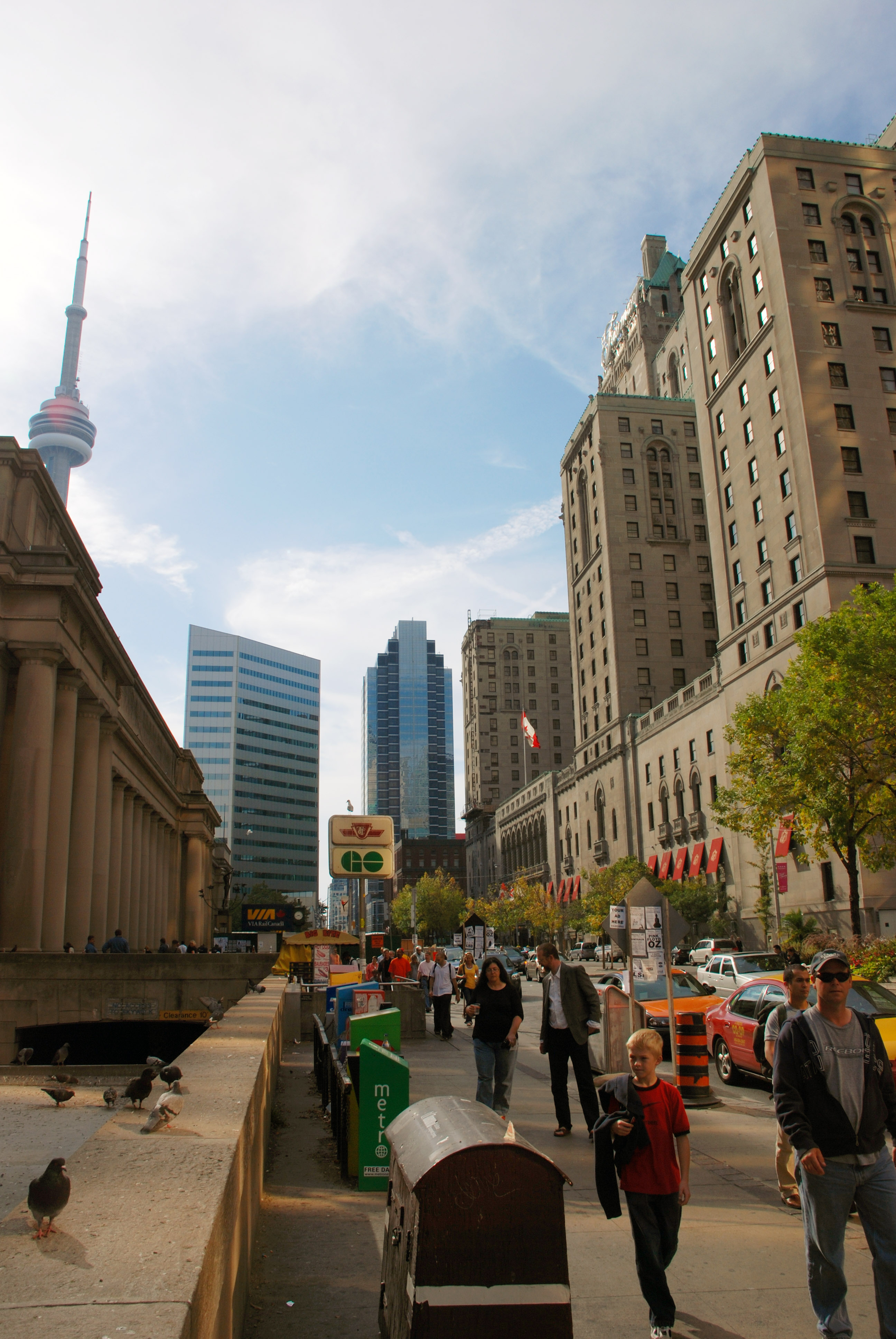
Downtown Toronto from Front Street, with the CN Tower (left background), Union Station (left foreground), Simcoe Place (centre), and Fairmont Royal York (right) in view in 2007. Architecture in Toronto can be described as an eclectic combination of various architectural styles.

The architecture of Toronto is an eclectic combination of architectural styles, ranging from 19th century Georgian architecture to 21st century postmodern architecture and beyond.

Initially, the city was on the periphery of the architectural world, embracing styles and ideas developed in Europe and the United States with only limited local variation.

However, a few unique styles of architecture have emerged from Toronto since the late 19th century, such as the bay and gable style house and the Annex style house.

Toronto's older buildings are influenced by the city's history and culture. Most of the city's older buildings adopted designs found in other areas of the British Empire, such as Georgian, Victorian, Edwardian, and various revival-styled designs that were popular during the 19th and early 20th century.

In the years following World War II, the city experienced massive growth and adopted a number of modernist and postmodernist architectural styles, including the International Style and the towers in the park concept. With the adoption of the Greenbelt throughout the Greater Toronto Area in 2005, the region has experienced a large condo boom amid the Canadian property bubble with many designs adopting neomodern styles.

Since the end of World War II, many prominent architects have done work in the city, including Toronto native Frank Gehry, Daniel Libeskind, Norman Foster, Will Alsop, I. M. Pei, and Ludwig Mies van der Rohe. Reflecting this eclectic combination of architecture, Lawrence Richards, a member of the Faculty of Architecture at the University of Toronto, has said "Toronto is a new, brash, rag-tag place—a big mix of periods and styles."

The growth of the city is influenced by the geography of the city, most notably the Toronto ravine system and the Greenbelt, a permanently protected area of green space, farmland, forests, wetlands, and watersheds within the Golden Horseshoe.

The natural geography of the city also provided builders with a variety of resources to build from. The most abundant raw material was the shale layer underlying the city, as well as the abundance of clay, making brick an especially inexpensive and available material, and resulting in many of the city's buildings being built from brick.

== Geography ==
=== Landscape ===
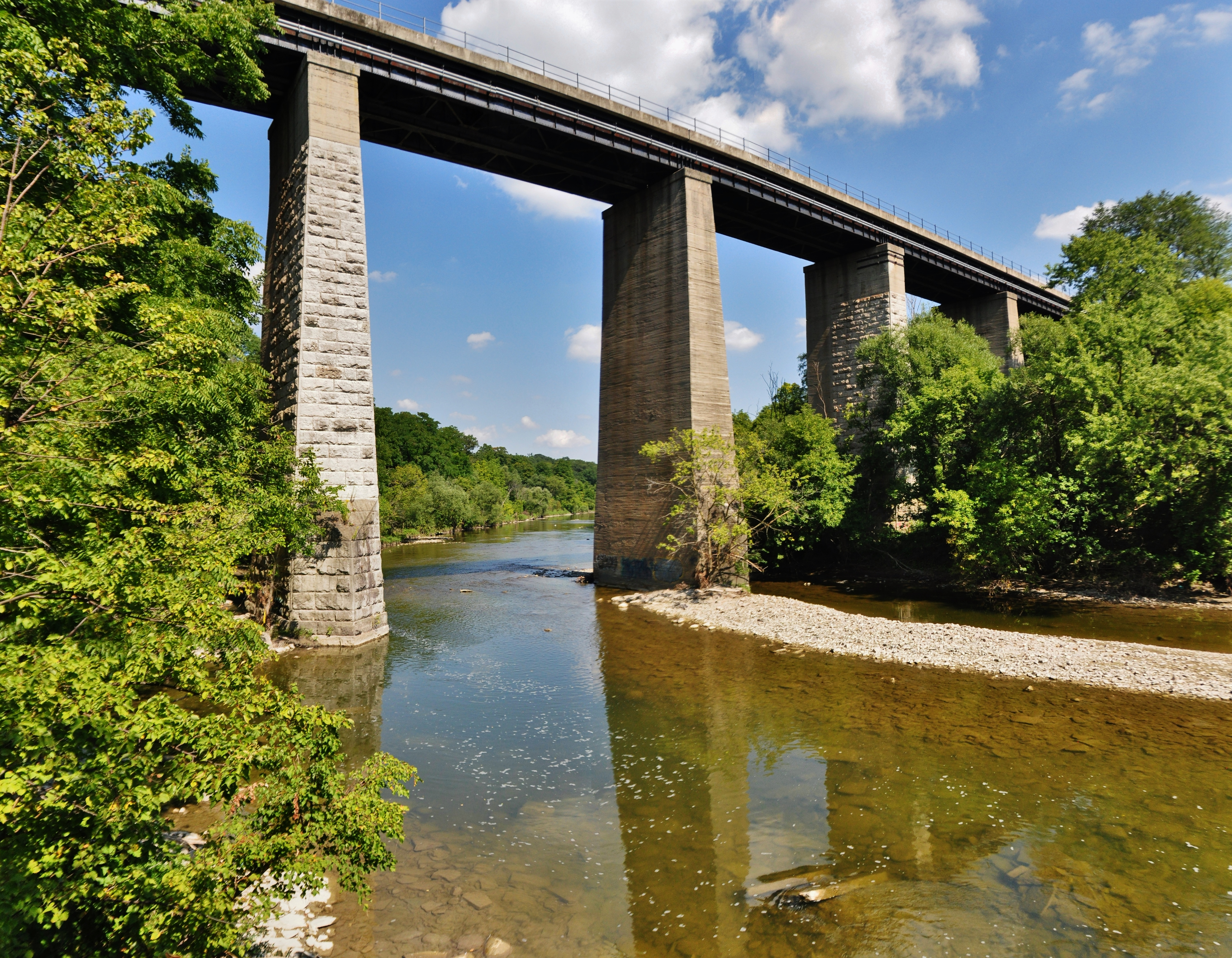
A railway bridge over the Humber River valley. The Toronto ravine system acted as a barrier towards development, resulting in most ravines being left close to their natural state.

Toronto is built on the former lake bed of Lake Iroquois. This large flat expanse presents few natural limits to growth, and throughout its history, Toronto has sprawled outward and today has a ring of suburbs that spans hundreds of square kilometres. In 2005, the provincial government has attempted to place an artificial limit to this growth in the form of a Greenbelt around the city.

The Upper Canada government planned the townships that later became the modern city of Toronto out on a grid system of concession lines that separated rural landholdings with concession lines in York Township being spaced about 2.01 kilometres (1.25 mi) apart. Major avenues were established along each concession line as the city spread outward. These avenues run straight with few diversions for long stretches, and Toronto is notable for the considerable length of its major streets. Most of the avenues go from one side of the city to the other and often continue deep into the neighbouring suburbs. Suburban expansion replaced these rural lots with subdivisions made of crescents and cul-de-sacs. These local road networks were designed to reduce and slow traffic, redirecting vehicles to the avenues. These wide avenues that even run through the central city have also made it easier for Toronto to retain a streetcar system, which was among the few North American cities to do so.

The most important obstacle to construction is Toronto's network of ravines. Historically, city planners filled in many of the ravines, and when this was not possible, planners mostly ignored them, though today, the remaining ones are embraced for their natural beauty and for flood protection. Ravines have helped isolate some central neighbourhoods from the rest of the city, and have contributed to the exclusivity of certain neighbourhoods such as Rosedale.

=== Building materials ===
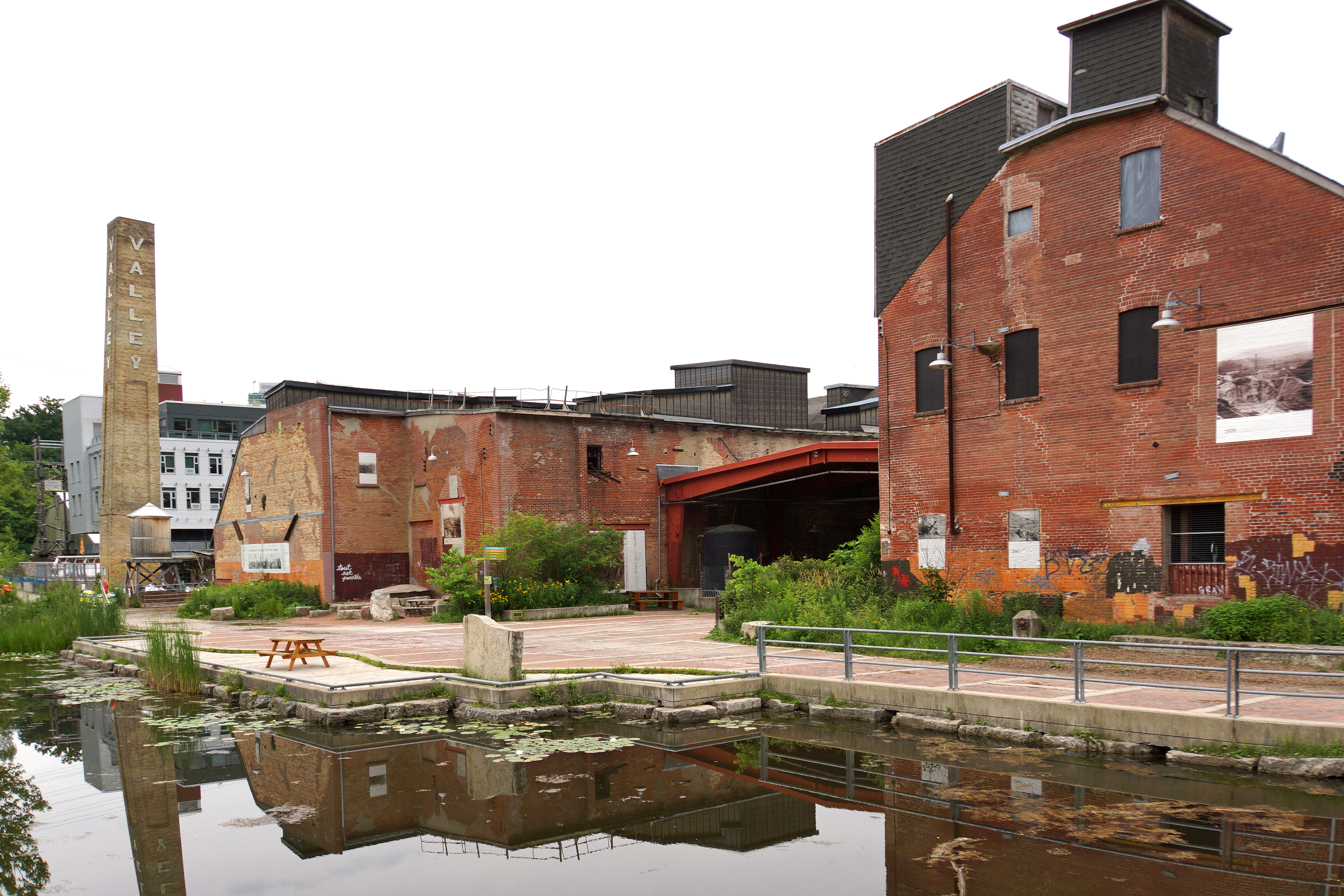
The Don Valley Brick Works was a clay quarry that provided bricks used in many local buildings from the late-19th to 20th centuries as seen in 2014.

Thanks to its vast hinterland, Toronto designers have had access to a wide array of raw materials for construction. Due to the clay sediments of the former lake bed that Toronto is built upon, and but more prominently the shale layer underlying this area of North America, brick has been an especially cheap and available material for almost the city's entire history. Much of it was provided by the Don Valley Brick Works, Domtar's brick division, Canada Brick and Brampton Brick, whose output can still be found in thousands of structures across the city and throughout the surrounding regions. Throughout the city, most homes from all eras are made of brick or brick and cinder block. Commercial and industrial builders also long embraced brick, with the Distillery District being a prominent example, though today, more efficient materials, such as concrete blocks, are more common for commercial projects. Prominent landmarks have also gone to greater expense and generally eschewed simple brick. Older banks and government buildings used stone, most commonly limestone, and modern attempts to marvel have embraced modern materials such as concrete and aluminum, in addition to extensive use of glass (glazing). Even today, the overwhelming bulk of residential buildings constructed in Toronto are clad in brick.

Sandstone was also historically a readily available building material, with large deposits quarried from the Credit River valley. More expensive than brick, but more ornate, it was used for many early landmarks such as the Ontario Legislature, Old City Hall, and Victoria College, giving those buildings a characteristic pinkish colour. It is also the main material used in the unique Annex-style house.

== Industrial architecture ==
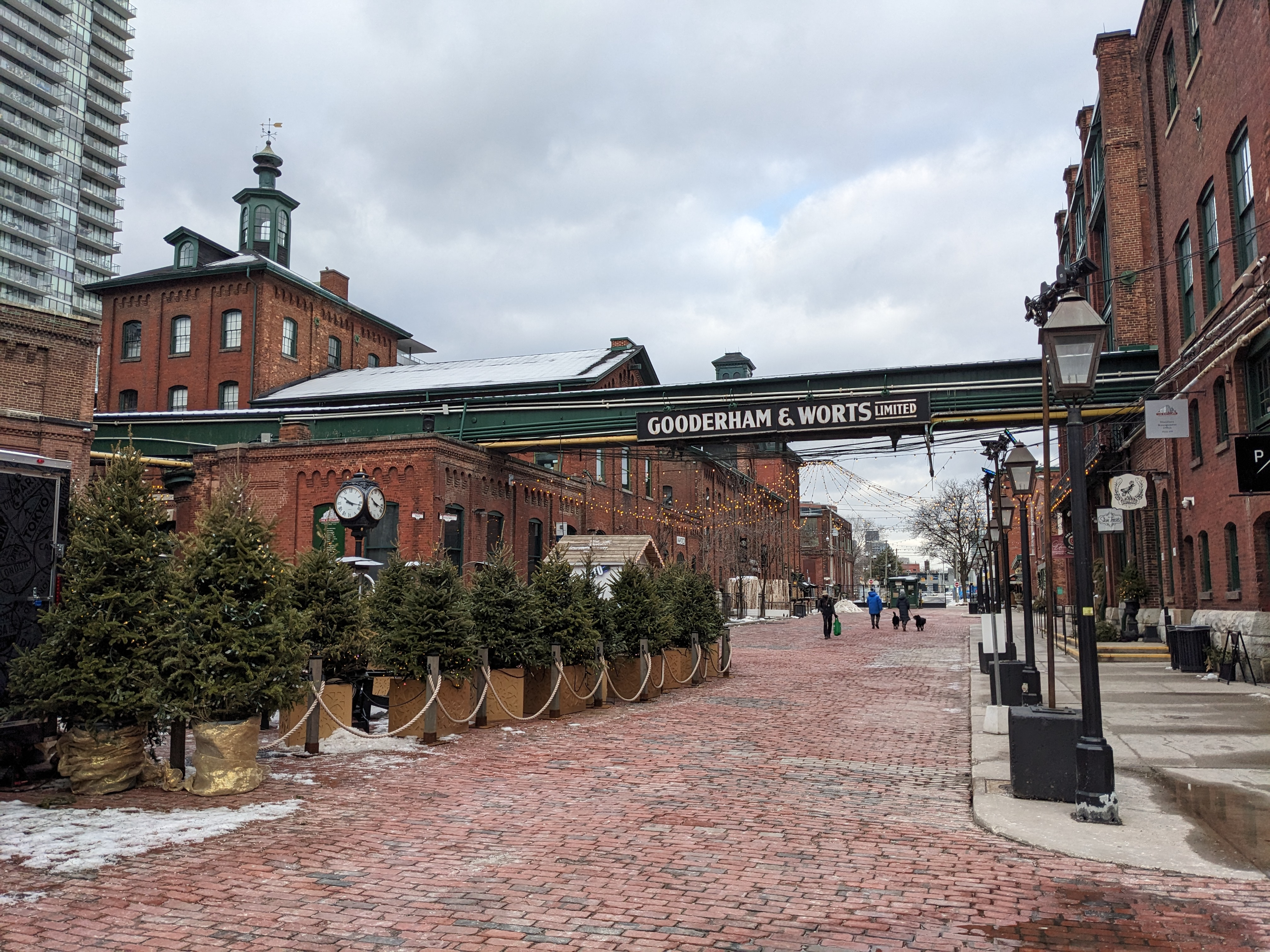
The Distillery District holds the largest collection of Victorian industrial architecture in North America.

The city of Toronto originally formed as a result of its good harbour, and the port was the source of the city's prosperity for most of its early history. The oldest parts of the city are thus by the harbour, with newer growth spreading out in all directions possible. Around the harbour grew up a belt of industrial structures, especially just east and west of downtown. These included massive facilities such as Gooderham and Worts whiskey distillery and Massey Ferguson's farm equipment factories. In the latter half of the nineteenth century, the railways became Toronto's main connection with the outside world, and further industrial areas grew up around the freight lines, in areas such as Weston and East York.

In the 1970s, deindustrialization began to have a dramatic effect on Toronto. By the 1990s, almost all of the older factories by the waterfront were gone. Some of the newer facilities further north still remain, but are constantly disappearing. Many of the more historic industrial buildings have been converted into lofts and offices with some becoming tourist destinations in their own right with stores and restaurants. Most have been demolished, and in their place, dozens of condominium towers have been erected by the lake shore. There are also still large stretches of abandoned industrial land in the Port Lands district and other parts of Toronto awaiting a redevelopment plan.

== Residential architecture ==
=== Nineteenth century and earlier ===
Few structures survive from the earliest period of Toronto's history. The oldest residence, and structure still standing, in Toronto is Scadding Cabin. Completed in 1794, Scadding Cabin is presently used as a heritage museum after it was relocated to Exhibition Place next to the Fort Rouillé site. Finished in 1807, John Cox Cottage, on Broadview Avenue, just north of East Chinatown, is the oldest known house in the city still used as a residence.

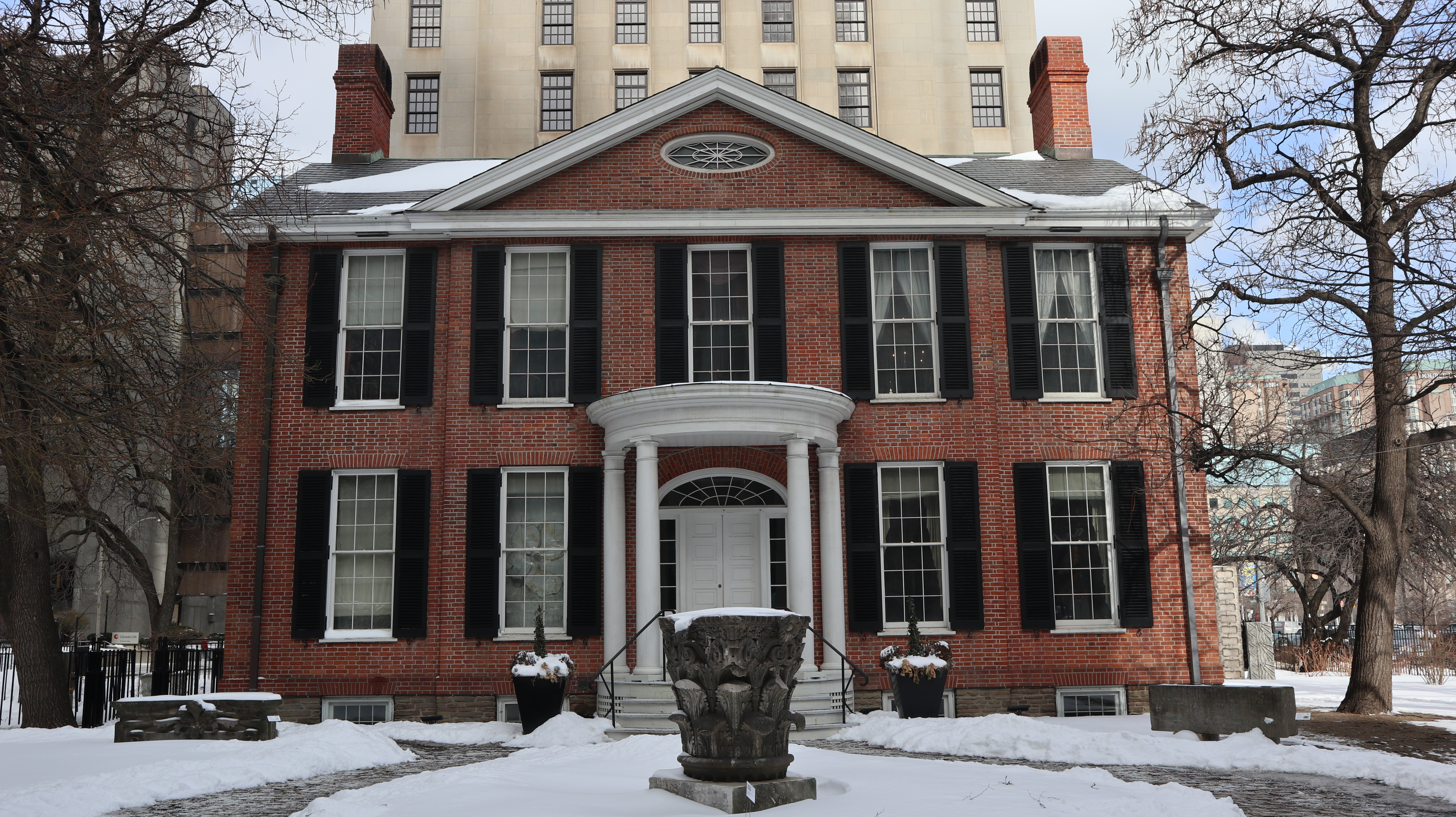
Campbell House is an example of Georgian architecture popular with Toronto's elite during the early 19th century and the house was later moved to its present site.

Two of Toronto's oldest surviving brick houses are Campbell House and The Grange. Both are brick structures built in the Georgian style during the first half of the 19th century, reflecting the tastes of Toronto's elite in that era. Although the Georgian style had long been out of favour in the United States, it remained popular in Toronto, with residents hesitant to adopt early American architectural styles. In Loyalist-dominated Upper Canada, the style was embraced with fervour in part because of its British connections. Incongruously, it had also fallen out of fashion in Britain by this time, where it was considered outmoded, but in Toronto, it remained popular until the 1850s. When the Colonial revival was embraced in the United States in the 1890s, Georgian architecture also returned to Toronto. Structures continue to be built in the style today. It has been especially popular with the city's elite and many Georgian manors can be found in wealthy neighbourhoods such as Rosedale and the Bridle Path.

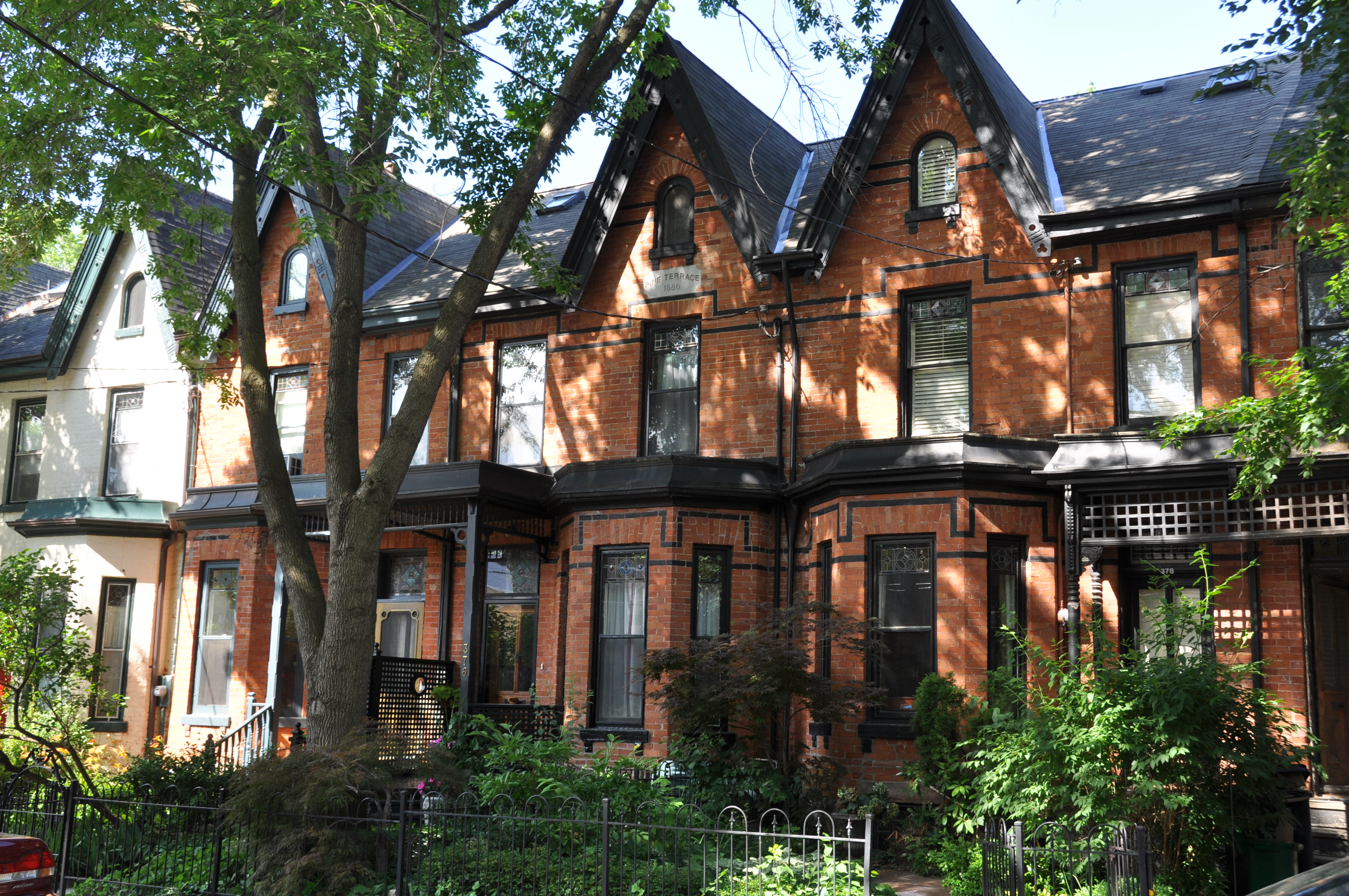
Popular in the 1870s, the bay-and-gable style is a Victorian residential design unique to Toronto.

The late nineteenth century Torontonians embraced Victorian architecture and all of its diverse revival styles. Victorian-style housing dominates a number of the city's older neighbourhoods, most notably Cabbagetown, Trinity-Bellwoods, Parkdale, Rosedale, and The Annex. These neighbourhoods hold some of the largest collections of Victorian houses in North America. During this period Toronto also developed some unique styles of housing. The bay-and-gable house was a simple and cost effective design that also aped the elegance of Victorian mansions. Built of the abundant red brick, the design was also well suited to the narrow lots of Toronto. Mostly built in lower and middle class areas the style could be used both for town houses, semi-detached, and stand alone buildings. Hundreds of examples still survive in neighbourhoods such as Cabbagetown and Parkdale. A residential architectural style unique to Toronto is the Annex style house. Built by the city's wealthy and mostly found in the neighbourhood they are named after, these houses contain diverse and eclectic elements borrowed from dozens of different styles. These houses are built of a mix of brick and sandstone, turrets, domes, and other ornamentation abound.

=== Rise of the suburbs ===
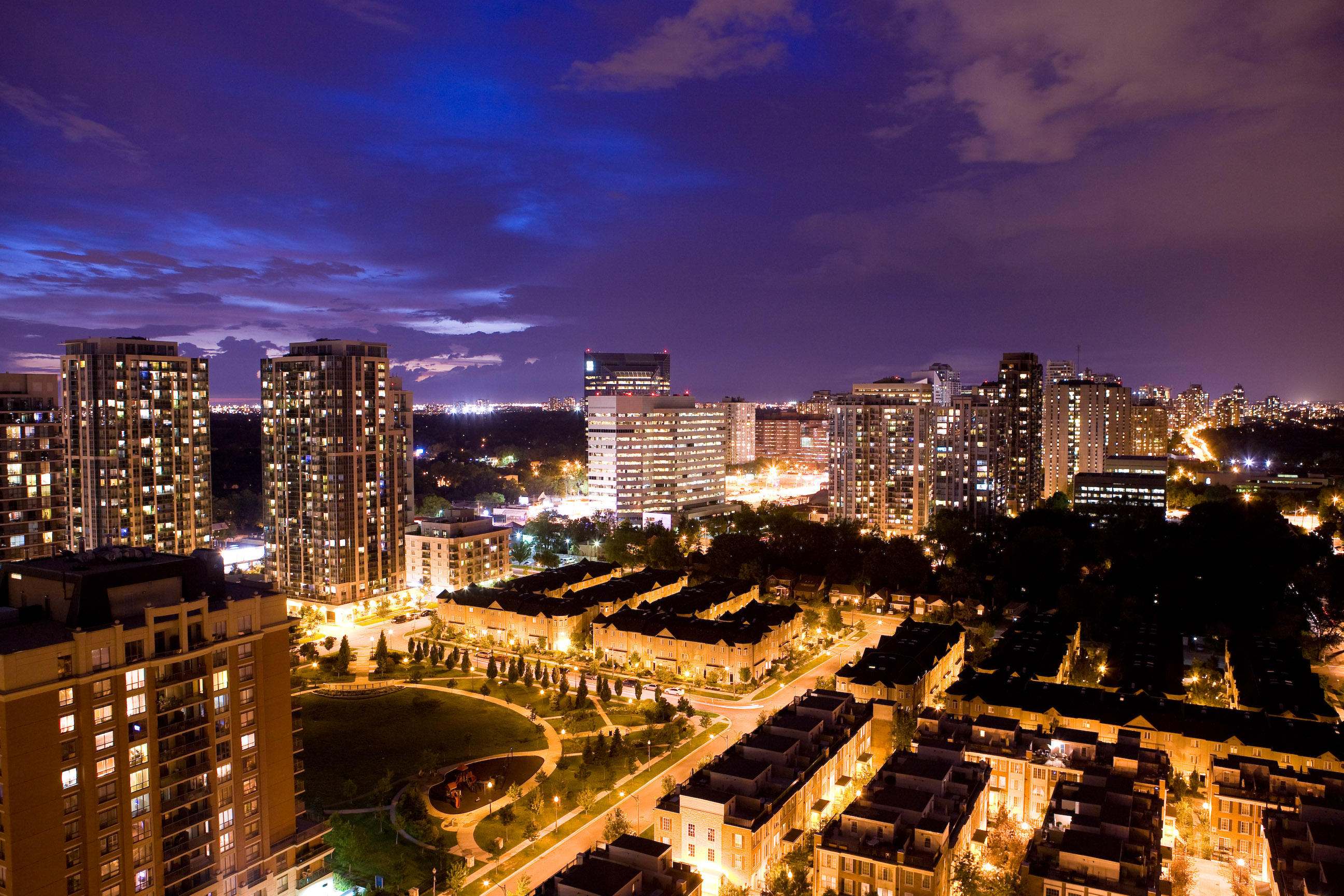
In an attempt to curb suburban sprawl in the 1960s and 1970s, many suburban neighbourhoods of Toronto encouraged high-density populations by mixing housing lots with apartment buildings far from the downtown core.

The post war years and the rise of the personal automobile saw the rapid rise of the suburbs, as occurred across North America. The most important suburban development was that of Don Mills in North York. Begun in 1952, it was the first planned community in Canada, and it initiated many practices that would become standard in Toronto suburbs. The Don Mills project put into practice many of the ideas of the Garden city movement, based on the ideas developed by Sir Ebenezer Howard, creating a multi-use community focused on distinct neighbourhoods.

The earliest suburbs in North York, Scarborough, and Etobicoke mostly consisted of small single family homes often bungalows. Over time suburban houses have grown in size and moved away from the simplistic post-war designs embracing the neo-eclectic style. Toronto suburbs are different in character than those of other North American cities. During the 1960s and 1970s, city planners tried to curb sprawl by encouraging high population density in the suburbs, with many modernist "Tower in the Park" style apartment complexes scattered across the suburbs, with several Toronto boroughs working to build their own central business districts and move beyond being bedroom suburbs to being centres of business and industry as well. This has had mixed results; this policy has made Toronto overall denser than most other North American cities, which has reduced sprawl and made it easier to provide city services such as mass transit. At the same time, planners avoided creating mixed-use areas, forcing suburban residents to work and shop elsewhere.

=== Apartments and high-rise condominium ===
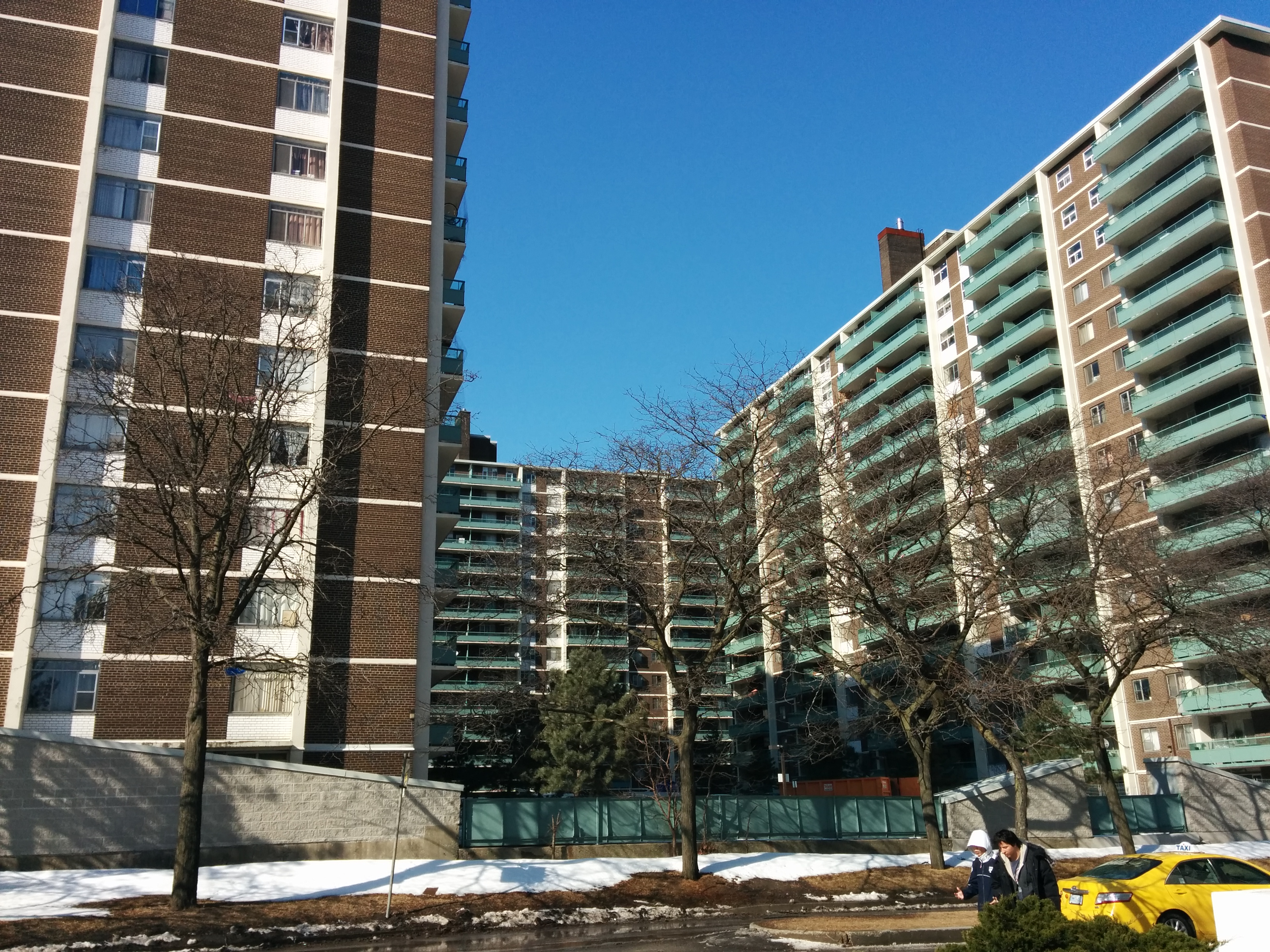
Modernist apartment towers of St. James Town, based on Le Corbusier's "towers in the park" concept.

The postwar years also saw the rise of apartment-style housing. In the 1960s and 1970s, this kind of housing was mostly focused on low to middle income residents. Beginning in the 1950s, the city bulldozed older lower-income neighbourhoods, replacing them with housing projects, ultimately destroying large sections of Victorian housing. The earliest and most notorious example of such projects was Regent Park. It replaced a large portion of Cabbagetown with a series of low-rise and high-rise buildings that quickly became crime-ridden and even more depressed than the neighbourhood it replaced. In later years, similar projects such as Moss Park and Alexandra Park were less disastrous, but also far from successful. Canada's densest community, St. James Town, was built in this era as a high-rise community of private and public housing in separate towers, also replacing a Victorian neighbourhood. These patterns changed dramatically beginning in the 1970s and gentrification began transforming once poor neighbourhoods, such as Cabbagetown, into some of the city's most popular and expensive real estate.

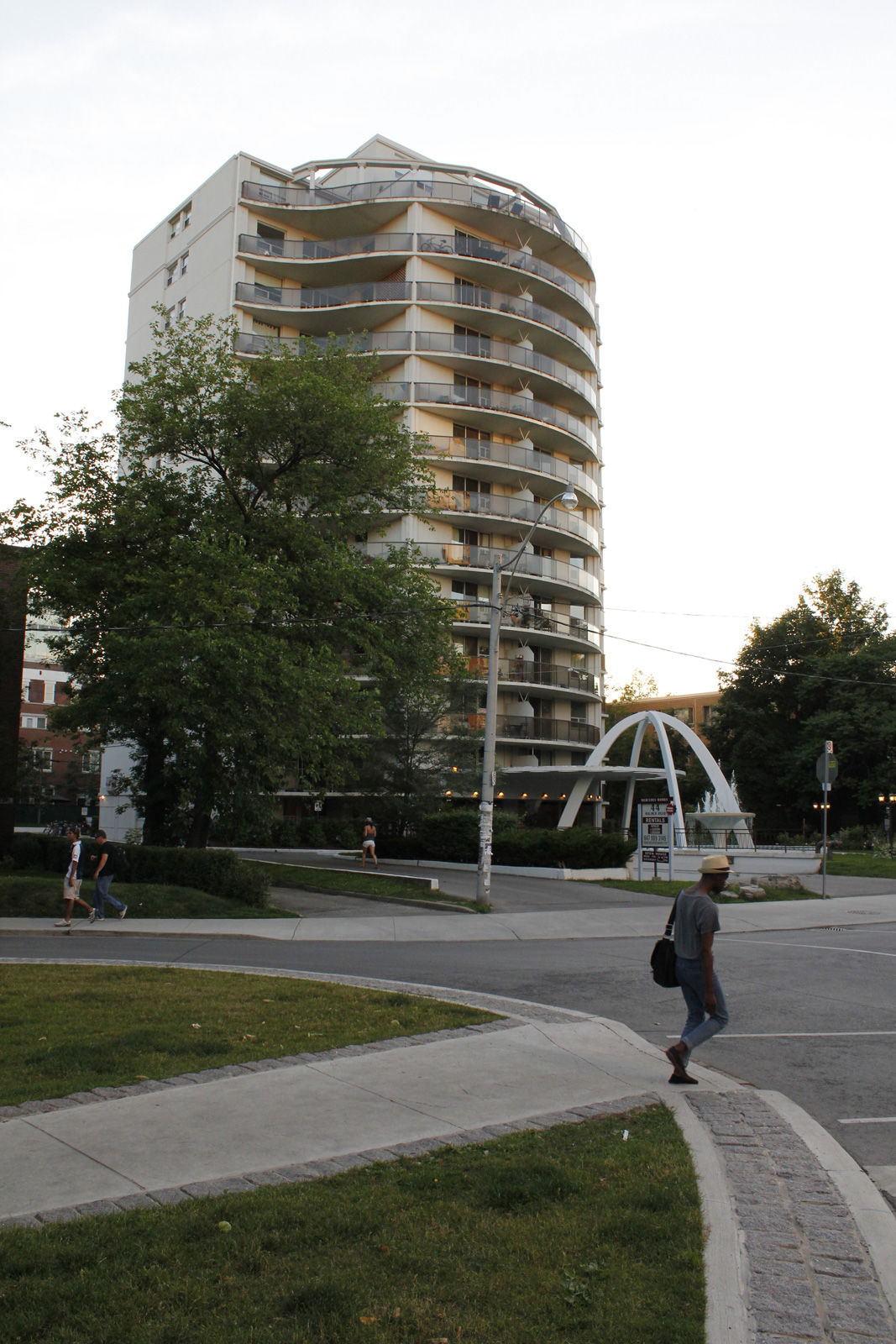
44 Walmer Road, a high-rise designed by Uno Prii and completed in 1969.

Outside of the core, even new neighbourhoods experienced significant high-rise apartment building construction, as builders embraced the "towers in the park" design, invented by Le Corbusier. The towers were built further from the sidewalk, leaving room on the property around the edifice for parking, lawns, trees, and other landscaping. They are typically simple, brick-clad high-rise buildings with rectangular footprints and little ornamentation other than repeating series of balconies for each apartment. However, some apartment buildings from this era utilize less conventional designs in the "tower in the park" format, such as the Prince Arthur Towers, Jane-Exbury Towers and 44 Walmer Road designed by Uno Prii.

In 1972, the Canadian tax code was radically altered making rental housing much less attractive to investors. At the same time, deindustrialization opened a number of new areas to residential development. The new projects took the form of high-rise condominiums. This form of housing was introduced in the province's Condominium Act in the 1960s, but it was not until the 1980s that condos become very popular. An initial condo boom started in 1986, but the market collapsed in the late 1980s and early 1990s recession, and many investors were badly mauled.

In 1995, condo prices were still 30 per cent below the earlier highs. That year, a new boom began in Toronto that has continued to this day. An unprecedented number of new projects have been built in Toronto. In 2000, Condo Life magazine listed 152 separate projects underway within the city of Toronto. By 2007, the number of projects in the Greater Toronto Area had reached 247. This development has led to some observers, such as Natalie Alcoba of the National Post, calling the Manhattanization of Toronto in reference to the densely built-up island borough of New York City.

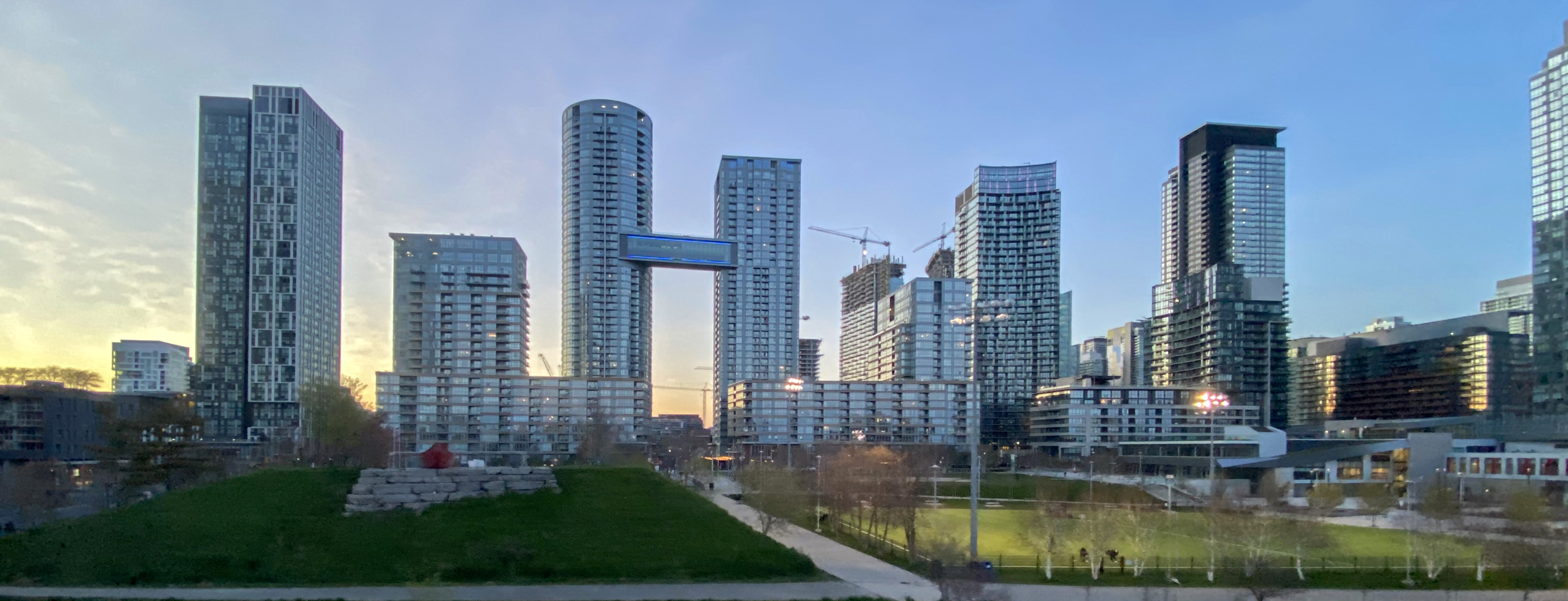
The skyline of CityPlace, made up of high-rises built during the early 21st century.

This development has been concentrated in the downtown core, especially in the former industrial areas just outside the central business district. The largest such project is CityPlace, a cluster of condo towers on former railway lands by the lake shore. This $2 billion project will eventually consist of 20 different towers housing some 12,000 people. Transit-oriented developments are also common in Toronto, such as at North York Centre and Sheppard Avenue East along the namesake subway line and Sheppard West along the subway line's future westward extension to Sheppard West station.

=== Secondary suites ===
Secondary suites have been permitted in Toronto since 2012 with laneway housing being permitted since 2018 and garden suites being permitted since 2020.

== Commercial architecture ==
=== Historical office buildings ===
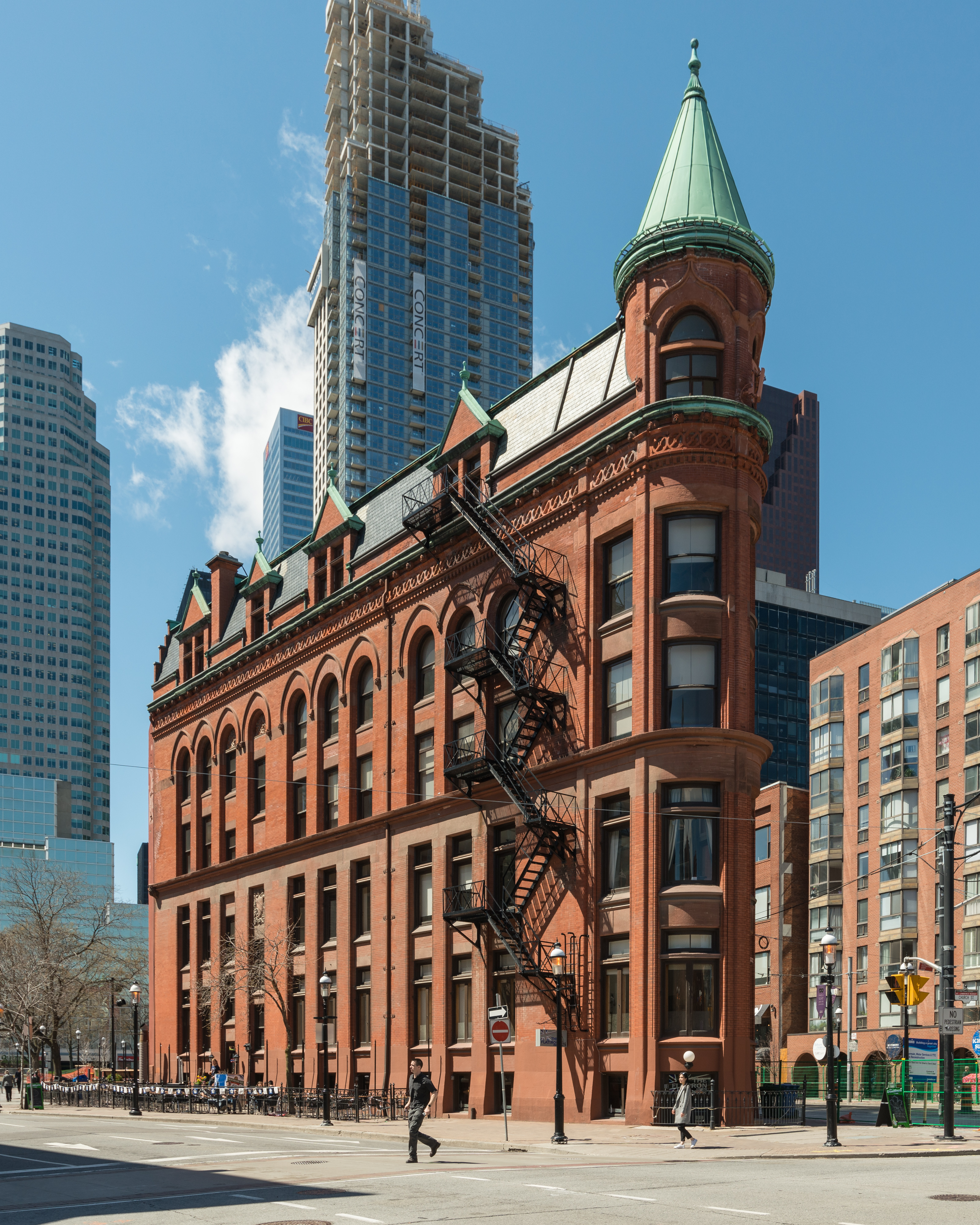
Gooderham Building in the St. Lawrence neighbourhood; it was completed in 1892

One of Toronto's most famous historical office buildings is the Gooderham Building in the St. Lawrence neighbourhood; the brick building was completed in 1892 and is an early example of a prominent flatiron building. It was originally built as the head office of distiller Gooderham and Worts until the firm moved out in 1952 and sold the building completely in 1957.

=== Financial district ===
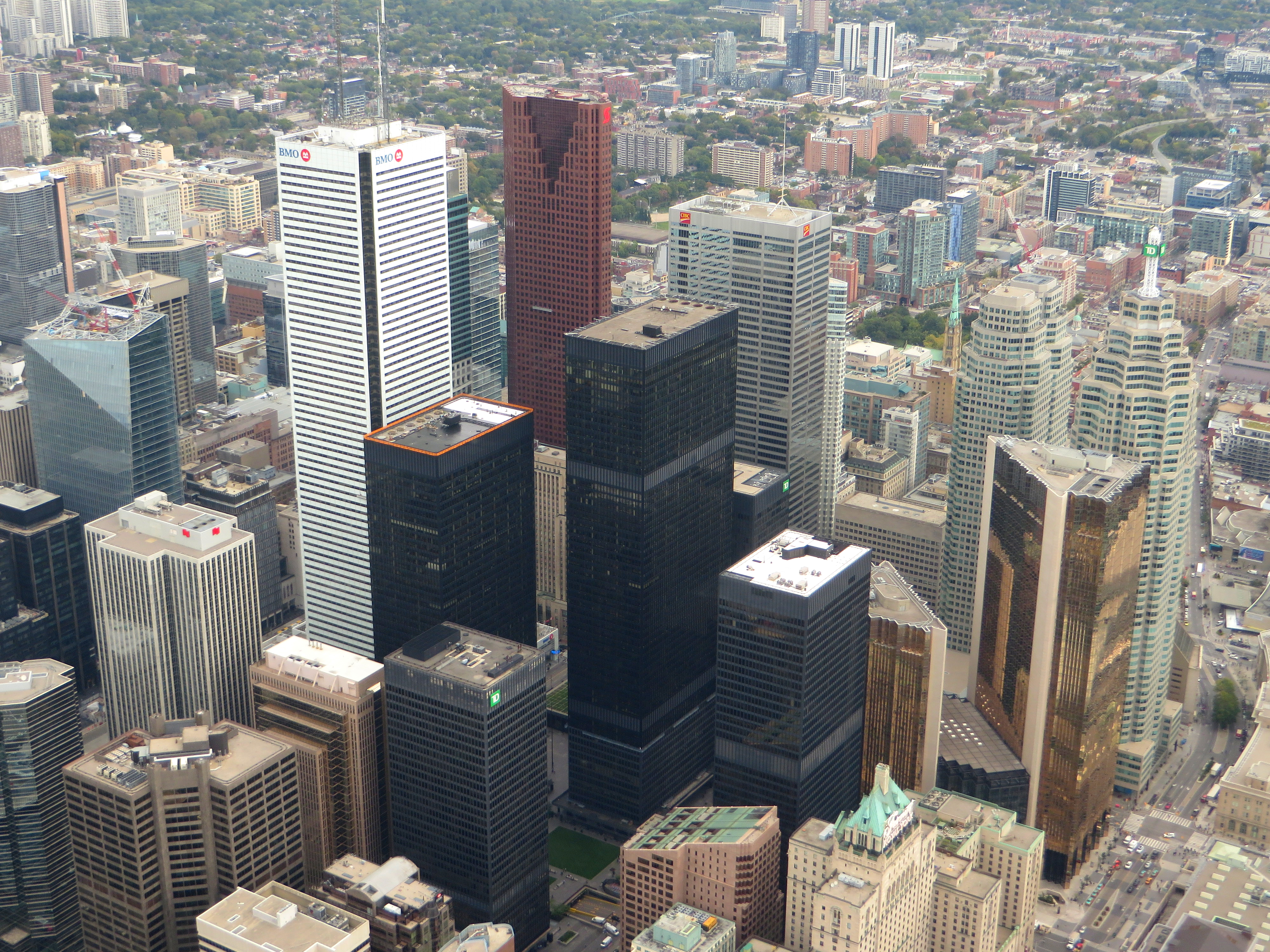
The offices for the Big Five banks of Canada in the city's Financial District

Toronto is the commercial centre of Canada. Many of the country's largest firms are based there, and most others keep a major presence in the city. Among Canada's oldest and most prominent firms are the Big Five banks and the banks have erected many of Toronto's most prominent buildings. The Financial District is centred on the intersection of Bay Street and King Street in the heart of downtown. The blocks at each corner of this intersection are home to office towers for the major banks. This cluster includes four of Canada's five tallest buildings.

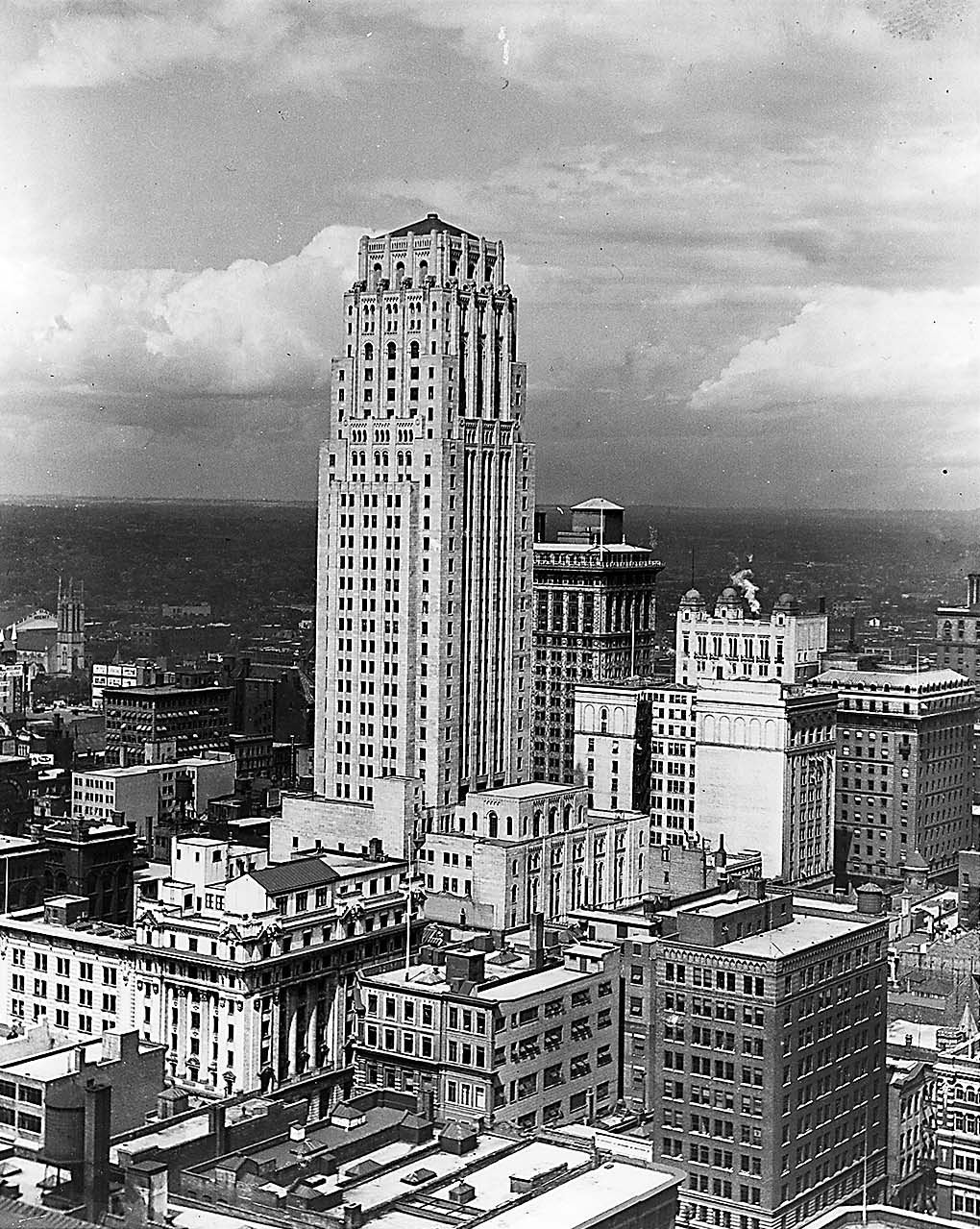
Commerce Court North in 1930. The bank headquarters was the tallest building in the Commonwealth of Nations from 1931 to 1962.

At the southwest of Bay Street and King Street is Mies van der Rohe's Toronto-Dominion Centre, a complex of six black International Style towers. Its tallest tower once dominated the Toronto skyline as the city's first modern skyscraper and the tallest building in Canada from 1967 to 1972. On the southeast corner is CIBC's Commerce Court complex. It is a cluster of four office buildings. The first building, known since the 1970s as Commerce Court North, was built in 1930 as the headquarters. Designed by the firm Darling and Pearson, the 34-storey tower was the tallest building in the British Empire / Commonwealth of Nations until 1962. In 1972, three other buildings were erected, thus creating the Commerce Court complex: Commerce Court West designed by I. M. Pei (the tallest building in the complex, at 57 storeys, and the tallest building in Canada from 1972 to 1976), Commerce Court East (14 storeys), and Commerce Court South (5 storeys). Across the intersection on the northwestern corner is First Canadian Place, housing the head offices of the Bank of Montreal. It was designed by Edward Durell Stone and originally clad in Carrara marble. Since 1975, it has held the title of Canada's tallest office building with a height of 298 metres (978 ft). Scotia Plaza, headquarters of Scotiabank, is the second-tallest building in Canada and is the newest of the office towers at that intersection, having been completed in 1988. Several other office towers are found just beyond Bay Street and King Street. To the south is the Royal Bank Plaza, the Royal Bank of Canada's main building in Toronto. At Bay Street and Wellington Street is TD Canada Trust Tower, the third-tallest building in Canada, and its mate, the Bay Wellington Tower.

CIBC will move its head office to CIBC Square in the South Core neighbourhood south of the Financial District in the mid-2020s.

=== Hotels ===
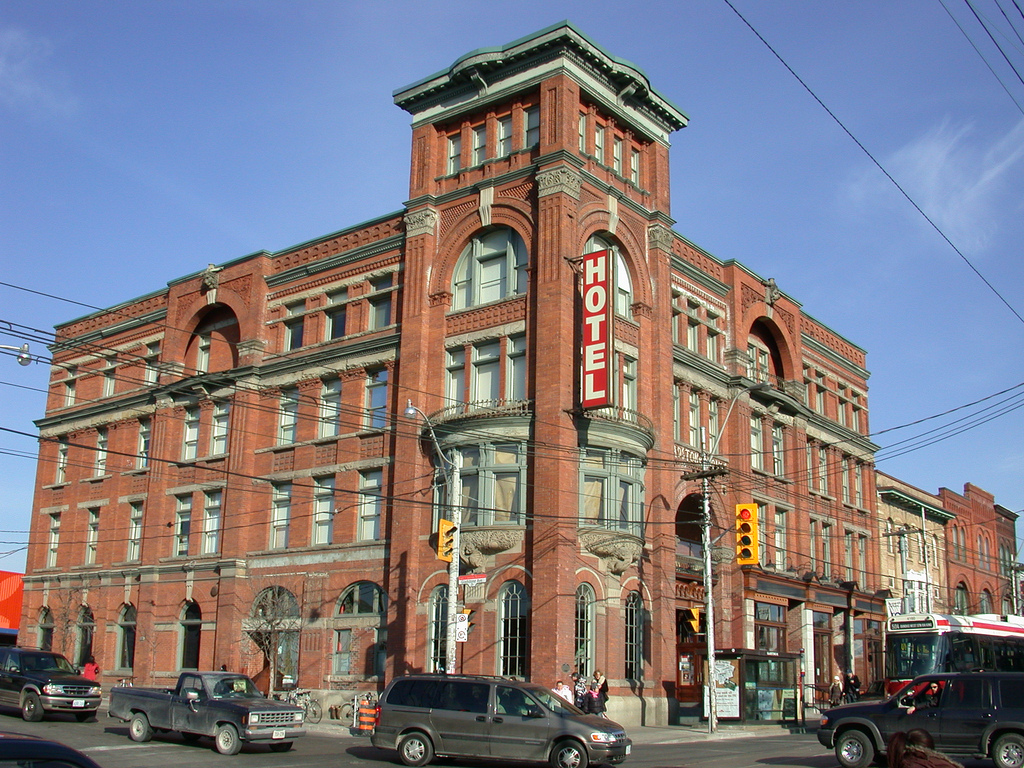
The Gladstone Hotel in 2007. The hotel was one of several built in the mid-to-late 19th century to service travellers from nearby railway stations.

Many of Toronto's early hotels were small inns and taverns that were built along each of the major routes out of the city. The oldest surviving hotel in Toronto is Montgomery's Inn in Etobicoke, which was built in 1832. The Lambton House is another surviving hotel structure that also served those travelling on Dundas Street. Both hotels had since been converted as museums.

The arrival of the railroad in the mid-nineteenth century dramatically changed travel patterns, and new hotels from this era were clustered around the railroad stations. Outside the central core, smaller hotels grew up to serve the stations in what were then the outer reaches of the city. In the west, these included the Gladstone Hotel and the Drake Hotel, while in the east, Broadview Hotel and the New Edwin Hotel were built.

The twentieth century saw a new generation of hotels, much larger and more monumental than before as the skyscraper came to prominence. The King Edward Hotel was established in 1903, and is the oldest major hotel still in operation in the city. In 1927, the Queen's was demolished and replaced by the Royal York Hotel. At the time, the new hotel was the tallest building in Canada and quickly became the city's most elite lodging. In the then-northern part of the city, this era also saw the erection of the Park Plaza in 1929.

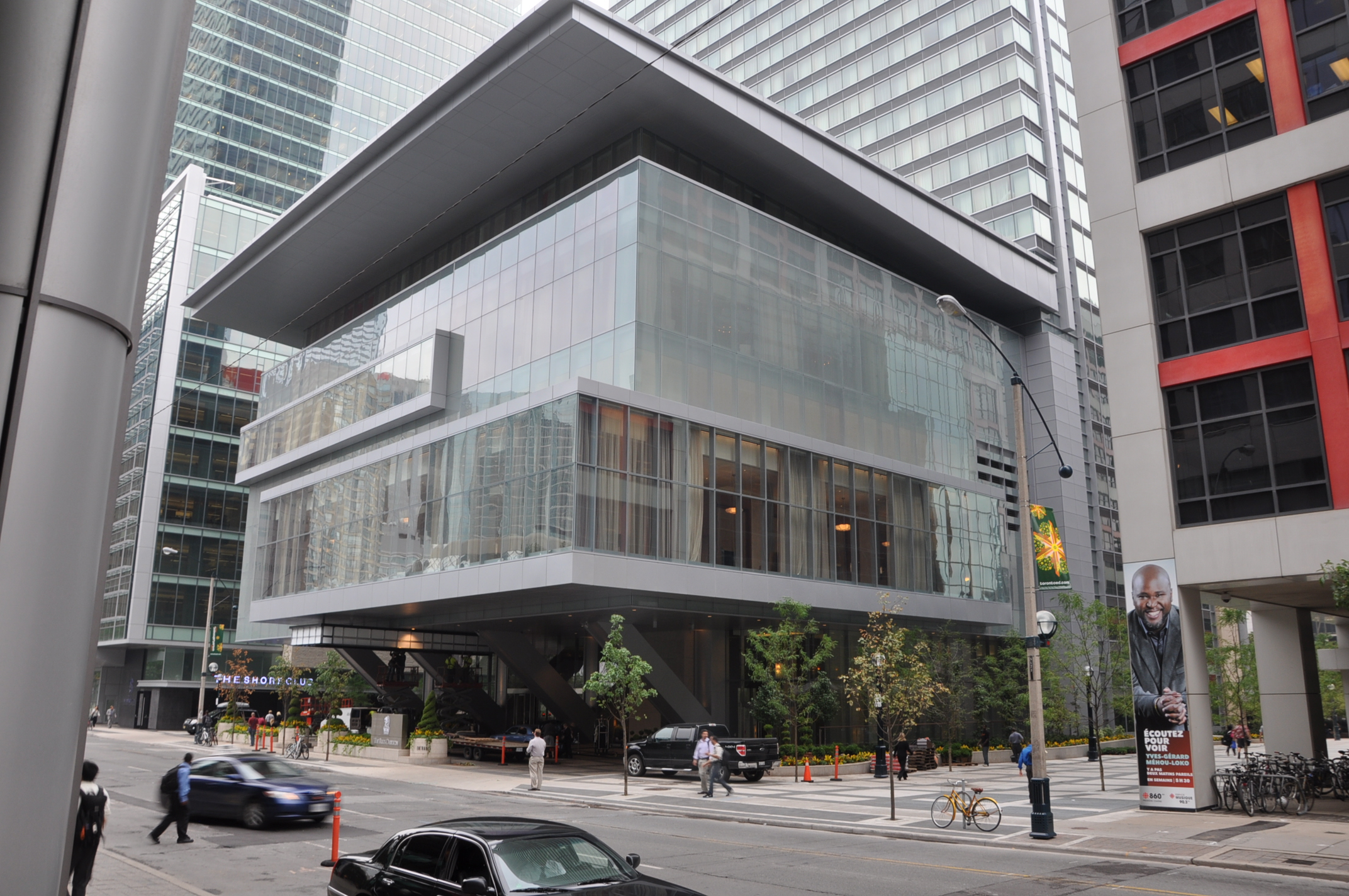
The base of the Ritz-Carlton Toronto, one of several high-rise hotels opened in the 21st century

The 1970s and 1980s saw several major hotel projects in downtown Toronto, with the Sheraton Centre, Toronto Hilton, Sutton Place (which has since been reconstructed as a condo), and Four Seasons adding thousands of new rooms to the market. The economic downturn at the end of the 1980s saw several hotels run into financial trouble. Since the mid-2000s, a booming real estate market, especially in downtown Toronto, has led to a number of new hotel projects, often in combination with condominium projects. An unprecedented number of major hotel projects were completed in central Toronto, including The St. Regis Toronto (formerly known as Trump International Hotel and Tower then The Adelaide Hotel Toronto), the Ritz-Carlton, Living Shangri-La, a new Four Seasons Hotel and Residences Toronto, and the Delta Toronto Hotel.

=== Main streets ===
A widely implemented and important concept in the Toronto cityscape is that of the Main Street (not to be confused with the street actually named Main Street in East Toronto, which is not the city's "main" street), which entails a streetscape that is

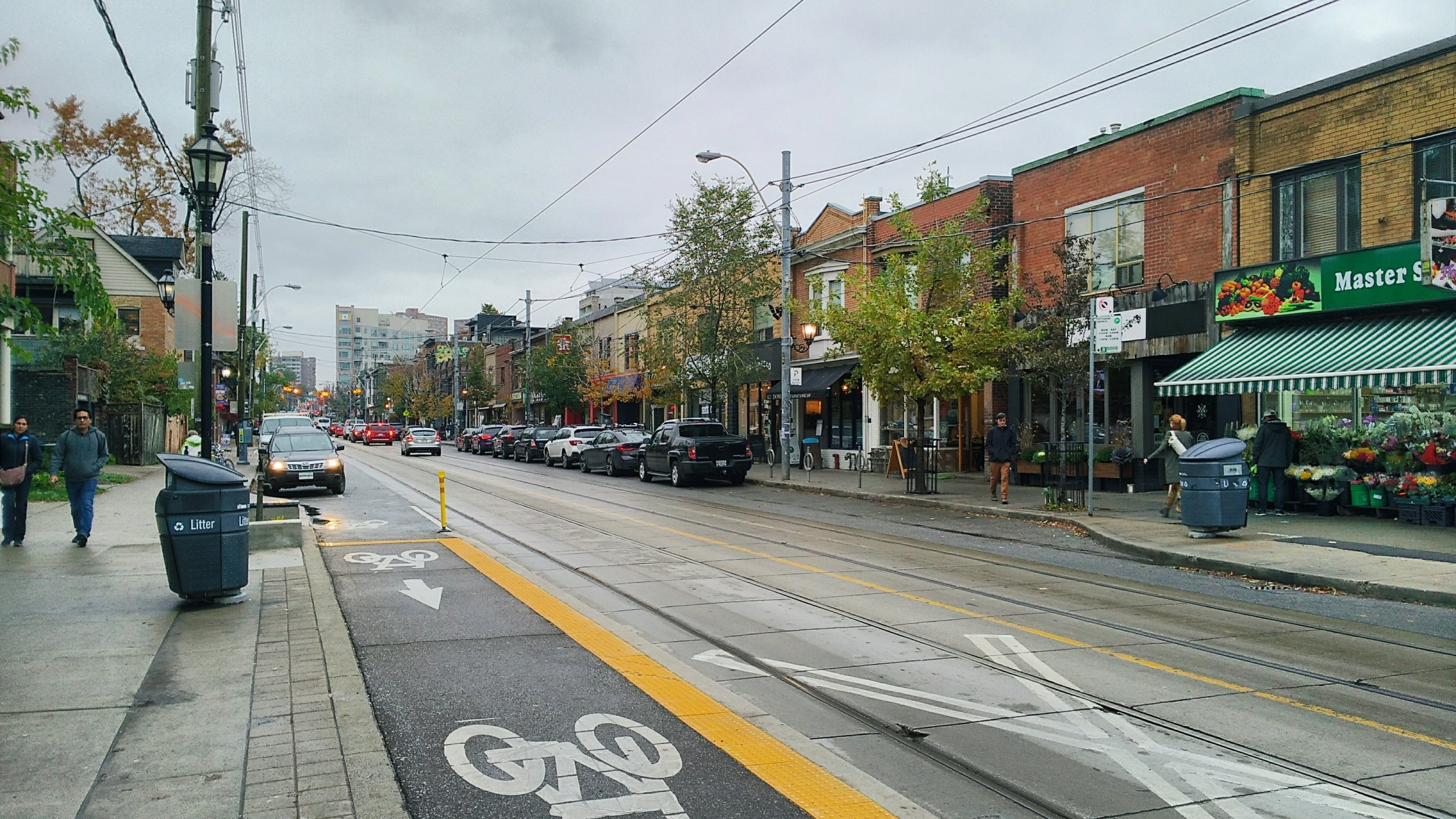
Storefronts on Roncesvalles Avenue in 2018

characterized by buildings on small lots (frontages less than 12.5 metres (41 ft)) ranging in height from 2 to 5 storeys. These buildings have street-related retail uses at grade and residential uses above. Typically, they are built to the lot line and span the width of the lot. These characteristics produce the familiar retail strip in which there is a continuous wall of retail activity and there is a direct relationship between the main entrance of a store and the public sidewalk.

The Main Street is the concept of small avenues and store frontages on busy roads, which maintain the vitality of communities and the continuity of the streetscape.

=== Shopping centres ===
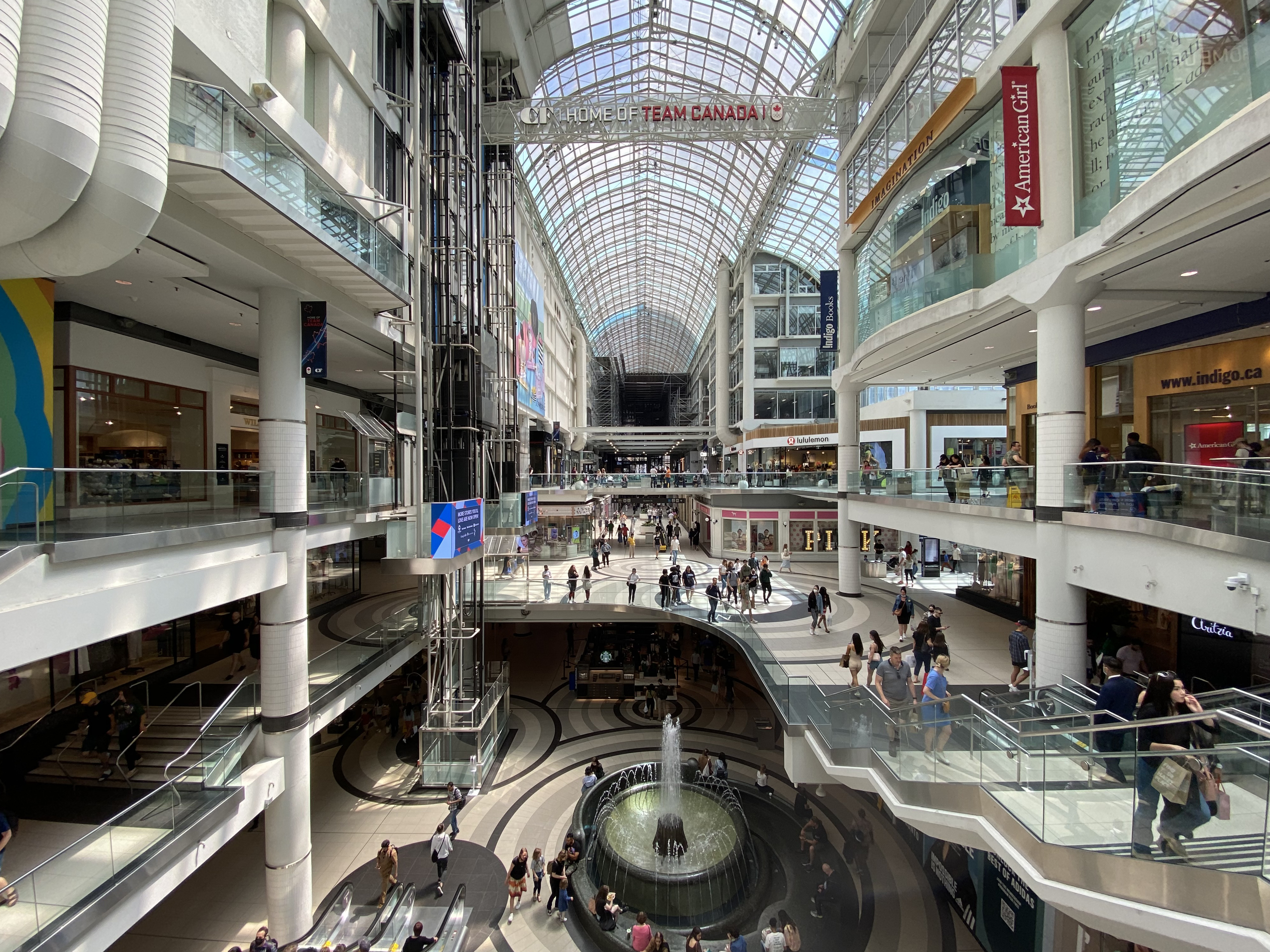
Interior of the Toronto Eaton Centre in 2022

Designed by Eberhard Zeidler, the multi-level Toronto Eaton Centre represented one of North America's first downtown shopping malls. It was designed as a multi-levelled, vaulted glass-ceiling galleria, modelled after the Galleria Vittorio Emanuele II in Milan, Italy. At the time of its opening in 1977, the interior design of the Toronto Eaton Centre was considered quite revolutionary and influenced shopping centre architecture throughout North America. Plans originally called for the demolition of Old City Hall and the Church of the Holy Trinity, but these were eventually dropped after a public outcry. Ultimately, Louisa Street, Downey's Lane and Albert Lane were closed and disappeared from the city street grid to make way for the new office and retail complex. Since the 2010s, the Toronto Eaton Centre is the most visited tourist attraction in Toronto and the most visited shopping mall in North America.

Large, sprawling retail centres are common in suburban Toronto. Of the more notable such centres is Yorkdale Shopping Centre, which opened in 1964 as one of the largest malls in the world. The mall was constructed with a novel system for its retailers to receive merchandise. Most shopping centres have their receiving doors located at the back side, while Yorkdale was constructed with a one-way, two-laned road for trucks running beneath the centre that leads directly to retailers' basement storages. Other large shopping malls in Toronto include Scarborough Town Centre, Fairview Mall, and Sherway Gardens.

== Institutional architecture ==
=== Government ===
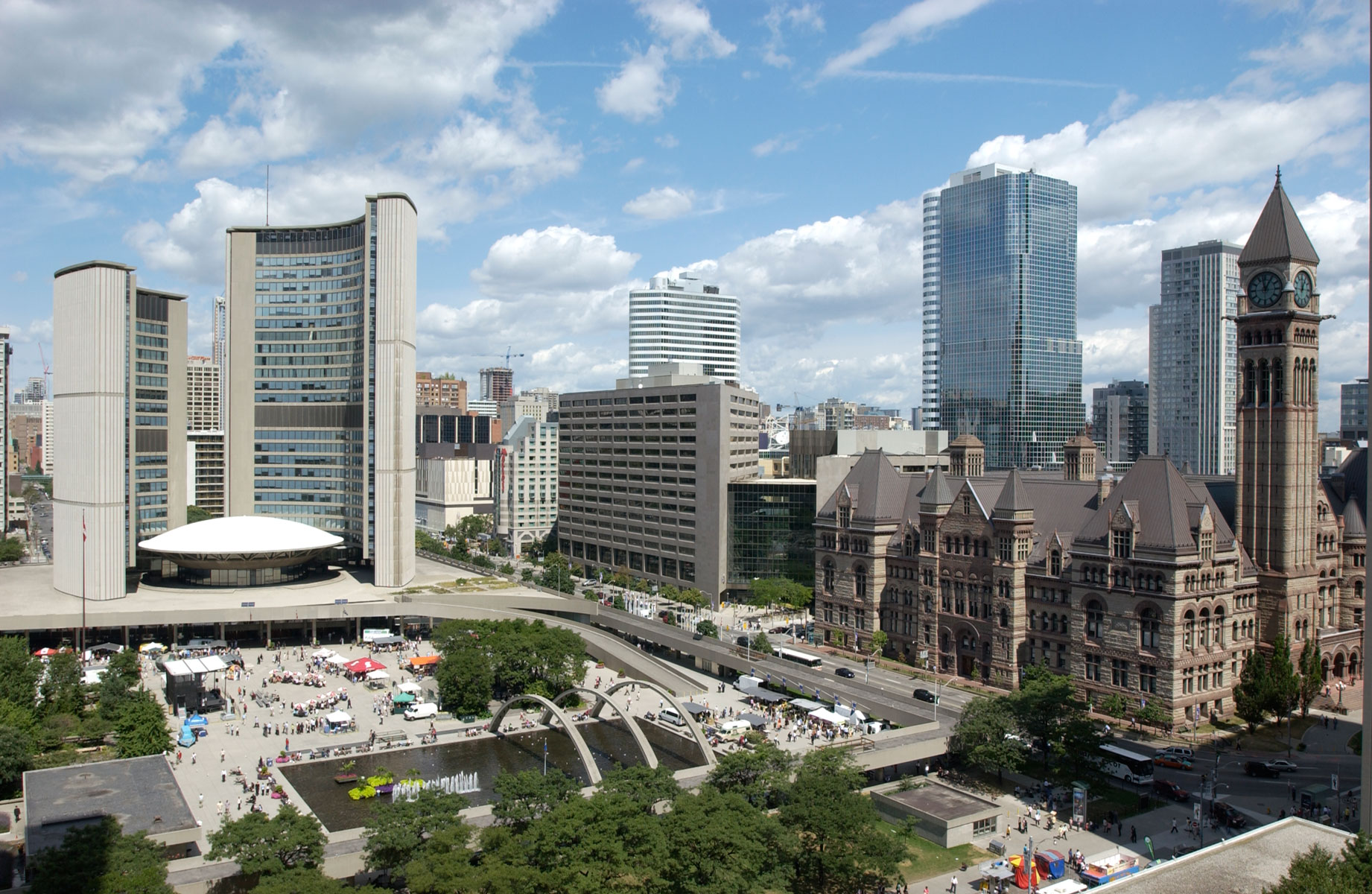
The modernist Toronto City Hall and Nathan Phillips Square (left) were built adjacent to the Victorian-styled Old City Hall (right)

Toronto is the provincial capital of Ontario. The Romanesque Ontario Legislature is one of the most prominent monuments in the city, forming a terminating vista at the end of University Avenue. To the east of the legislature are a number of governmental buildings, with the best known being the Whitney Block. Constructed over many decades, they embrace a number of different styles. The provincial government have been unwilling to pay for structures as lavish as those of the private sector, and few of the provincial buildings are of much prominence.

Two of the most distinct and well-known structures in downtown Toronto are the old and current city halls. The Old City Hall was built in 1899 and is a prominent example of the late Victorian Romanesque Revival style. Across Bay Street is the starkly different new Toronto City Hall opened in 1965. This brashly modernist structure was designed by Finnish architect Viljo Revell. It fronts Nathan Phillips Square, which was also designed by Revell. The Toronto Sign was installed in Nathan Phillips Square for the 2015 Pan American Games and a permanent version of the sign was installed in 2020.

=== Post-secondary institutions ===
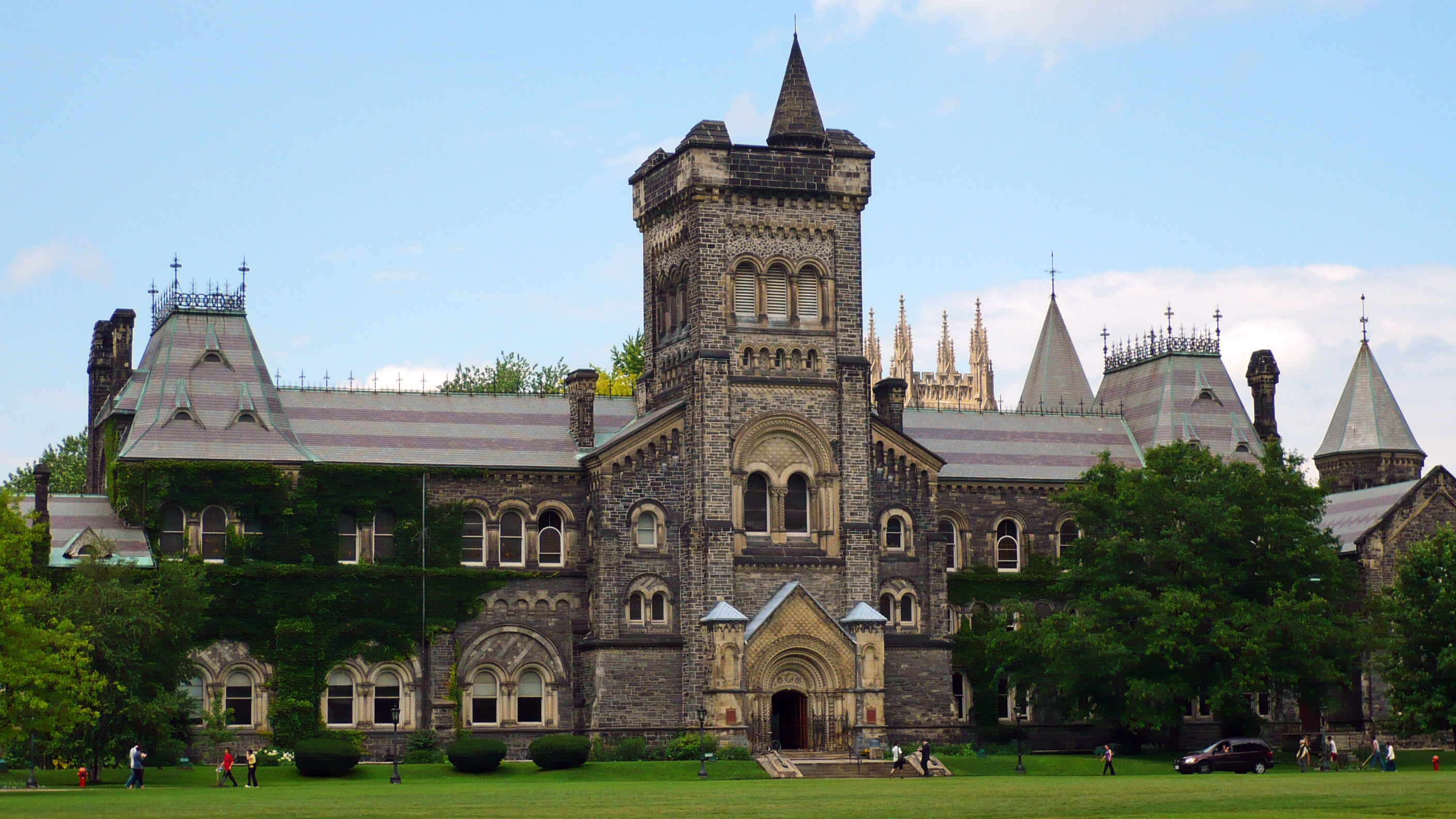
Designed by Frederick Cumberland using Norman and Romanesque Revival styles, University College's was completed in 1859.

The University of Toronto (U of T) has embraced dramatic design and monumentalism, and its prominent location at the centre of the city has given its structures a wide impact. Built up over almost two centuries, the university's buildings cover a wide range of styles. The Collegiate Gothic style was embraced for many of the earliest buildings, such as Hart House, Trinity College, and Burwash Hall, but there are also examples of almost all the Victorian revival styles on campus. In recent decades, the university has built examples of modernism, such as McLennan Physical Laboratories; brutalism, such as Robarts Library; and postmodernism, such as the graduate house by Pritzker Architecture Prize winner Thom Mayne. Sir Norman Foster designed the University of Toronto's Leslie L. Dan Pharmacy Building, which is home to the largest pharmacy faculty in Canada. It was completed in 2006.

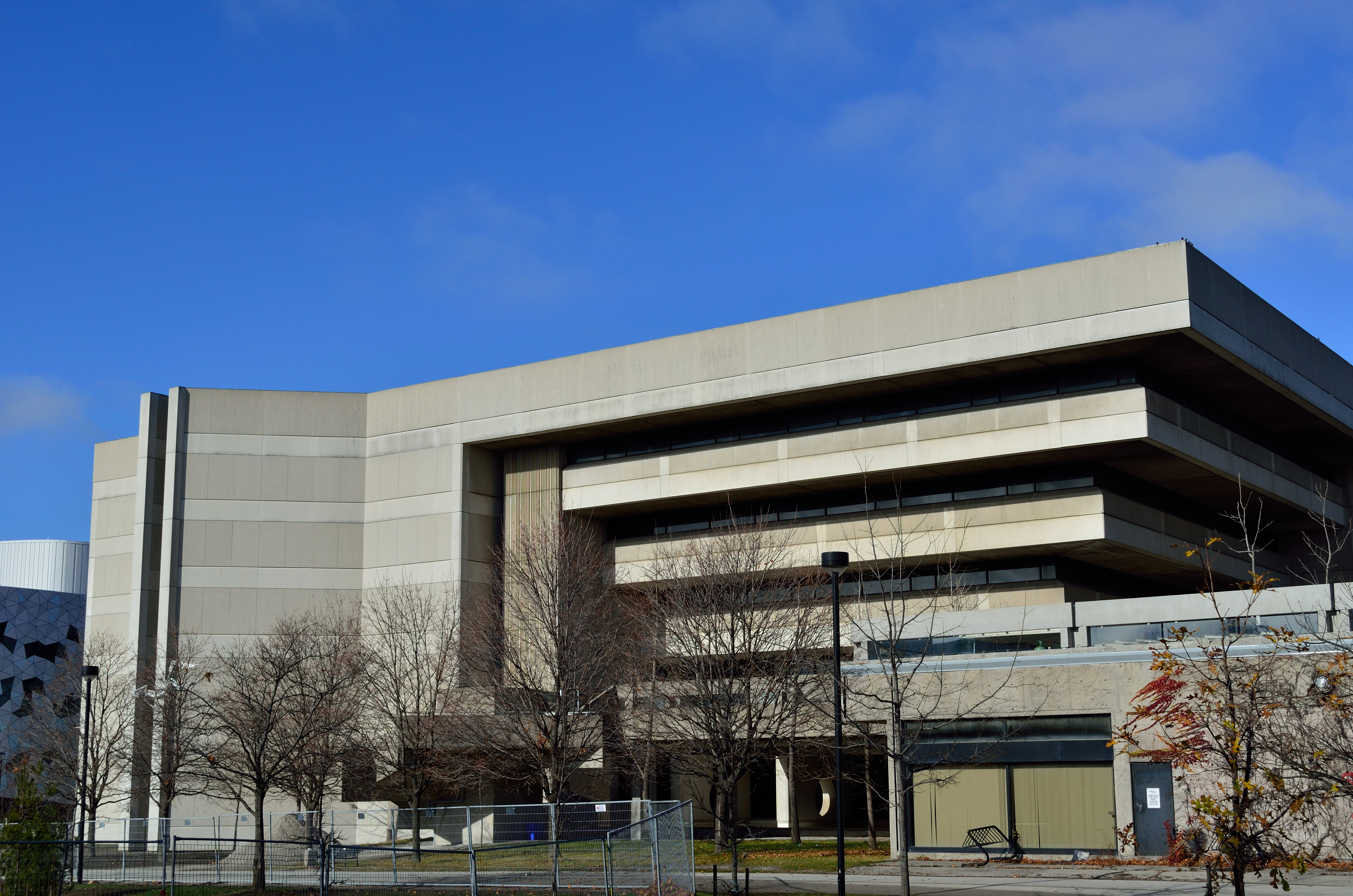
Scott Library at York University. This structure is an example of the Brutalist architectural style that proliferated among several Ontario universities from the 1950s to the 1970s.

The other two major universities, York University and Toronto Metropolitan University (formerly known as Ryerson University until 2022), have largely been built in more recent years and have fewer architectural monuments. Toronto Metropolitan was long mostly hidden within the downtown streetscape, with the Brutalist library, podium, and Jorgensen Hall complex being one half block east of Yonge Street, but since the 1990s, an unprecedented building project has greatly expanded the campus and made it much more visible. York, like many of the universities that largely came into being in the 1950s and 1960s, has mostly eschewed monumentalism in pursuit of less dramatic, but more egalitarian architecture, particularly Brutalist architecture, such as the Scott Library.

OCAD University (formerly known as the Ontario College of Art and Design), for many years confined to a series of comparatively unprepossessing buildings in the western part of downtown Toronto, was transformed in 2004 by the addition of the Will Alsop's Sharp Centre of Design. It consists of a black-and-white speckled box suspended four storeys off the ground and supported by a series of multi-coloured pillars at different angles.

=== Museums ===
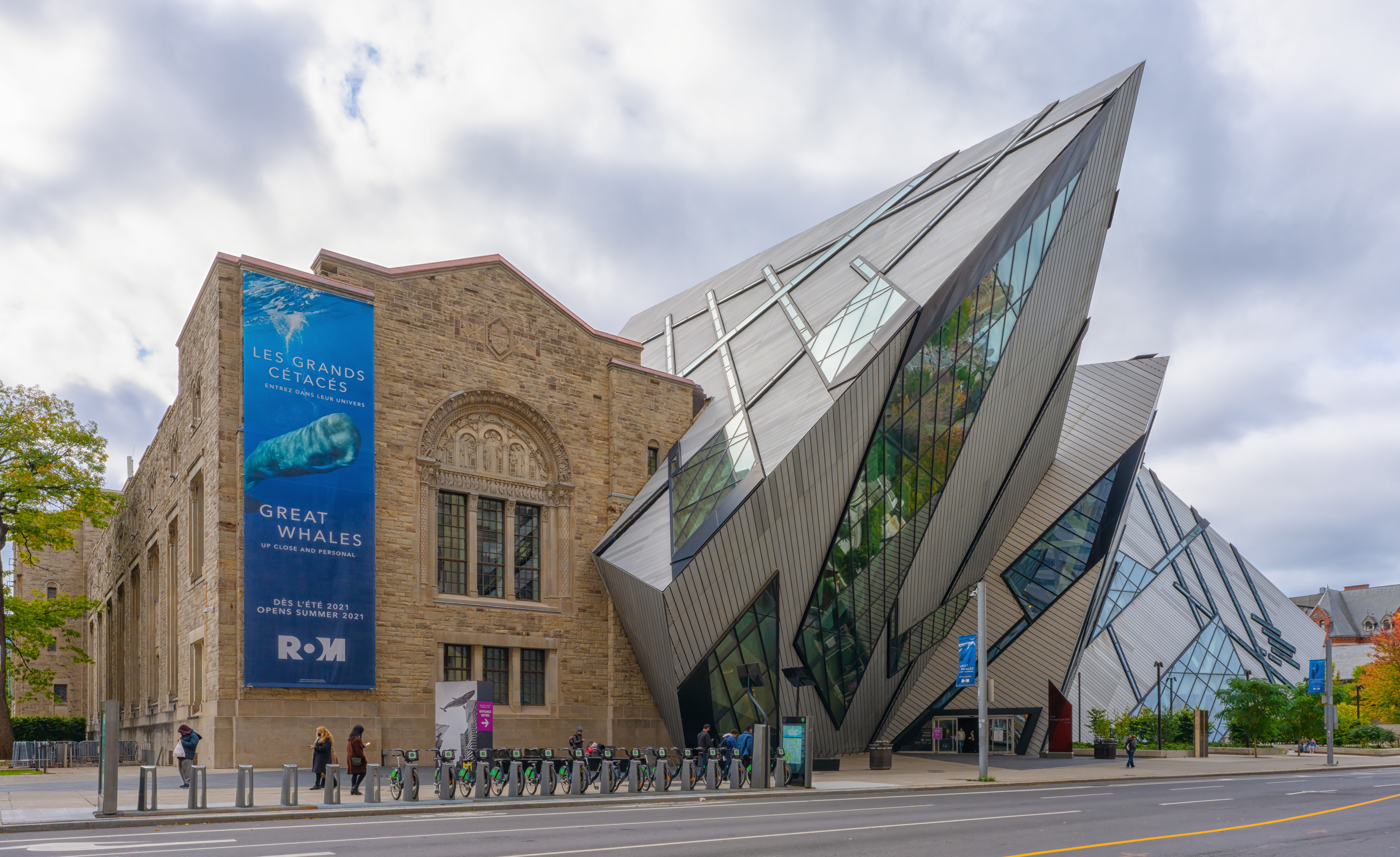
Opened in 1914, the Royal Ontario Museum was designed in a Romanesque Revival style. Art Deco, Neo-Byzantine, and Deconstructive styles were later incorporated.

Toronto is home to a variety of museums of varied styles. The Hockey Hall of Fame is housed in a Beaux-Arts building designed by Frank Darling that was formerly a branch of the Bank of Montreal. Several of Canada's most prominent museums are located in Toronto, and since the late 2000s, have seen a number of architecturally bold expansions. The Gardiner Museum commissioned KPMB Architects for a renovation and expansion, which was completed in 2006. The design consists of strongly pronounced rectangular and square windows, with various asymmetrical setbacks. Opened in 1914, the Royal Ontario Museum is Canada's largest. In 2007, Daniel Libeskind's expansion arrived, giving the museum a series of enormous "crystals" that rise dramatically five storeys from the street surface. These crystals are named after Michael Lee-Chin, who funded a significant proportion of the façade. Frank Gehry's redesign of the Art Gallery of Ontario, completed in November 2008, completely altered the museum inside and out. The new front façade of the gallery became an exercise in transparency, with the upper level transformed into a new sculpture court. Other museums include the Bata Shoe Museum on the north end of the University of Toronto, and the Aga Khan Museum and the former Ontario Science Centre site in the Don Mills area a few kilometres northeast of Downtown Toronto.

=== Houses of worship ===
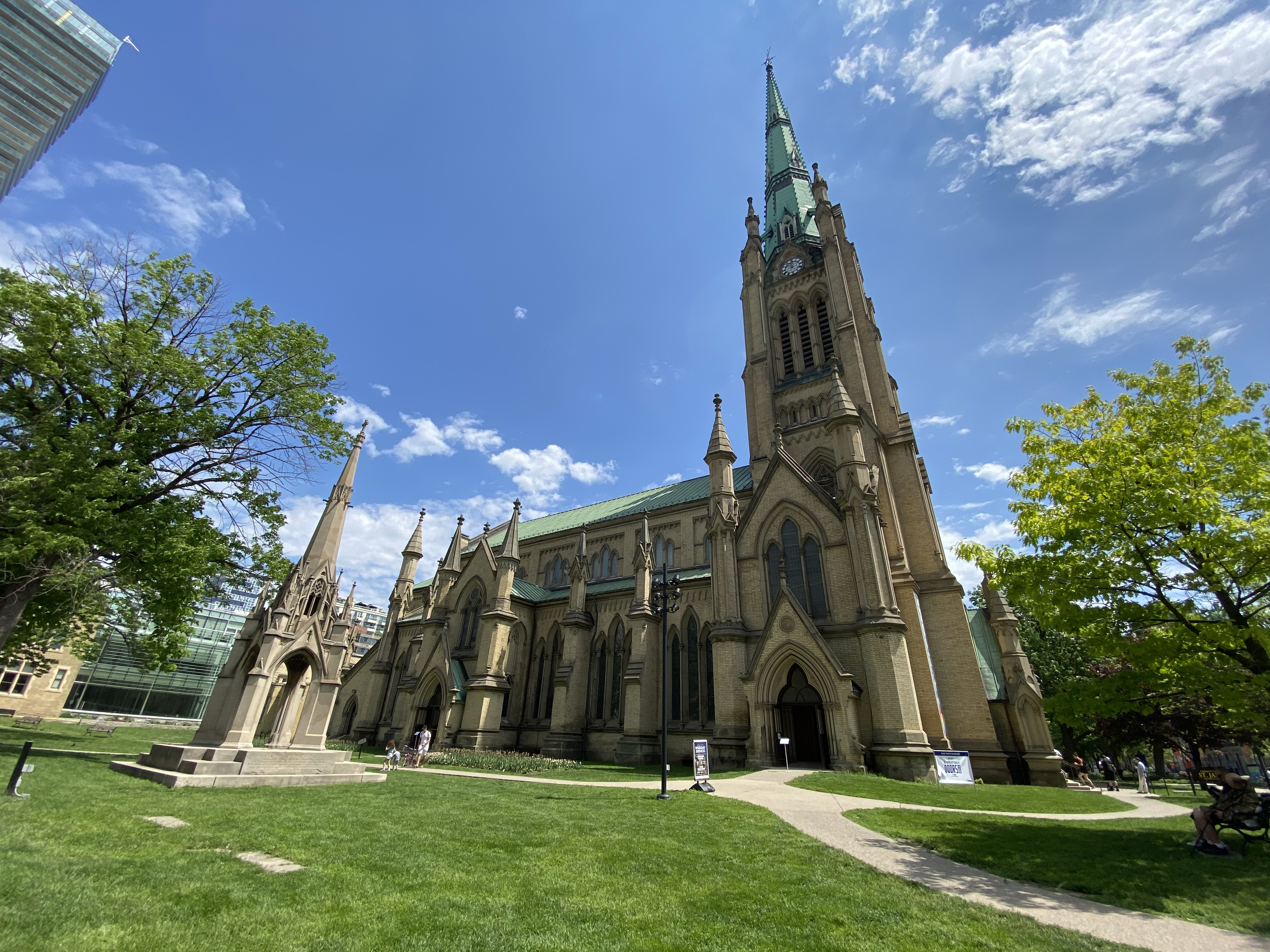
Opened in 1853, the Cathedral Church of St. James is one of many examples of Gothic Revival architecture in Toronto.

One of the most common institutions in Toronto is the large number of churches and other houses of worship. In the 19th and early 20th century, Toronto was home to a wide array of Christian denominations, each of which erected a wide array of churches in what is today central Toronto. Over time, the decrease in population in the core and the move away from mainline denominations has seen many of these churches disappear. Many still remain, and they are some of the more notable buildings in the city. While some very early churches were in the Georgian style, Gothic Revival became the dominant. Gothic Revival was used for essentially all major Protestant churches in Toronto up until the early 1950s. Roman Catholic churches were also most often Gothic, though Italianate and Baroque churches were also erected. The coming of modernism caused churches of all denominations to move away from the Gothic, and embrace modernist architecture with a wide array of designs. These are the typical church style found in the suburbs that were created after the Second World War.

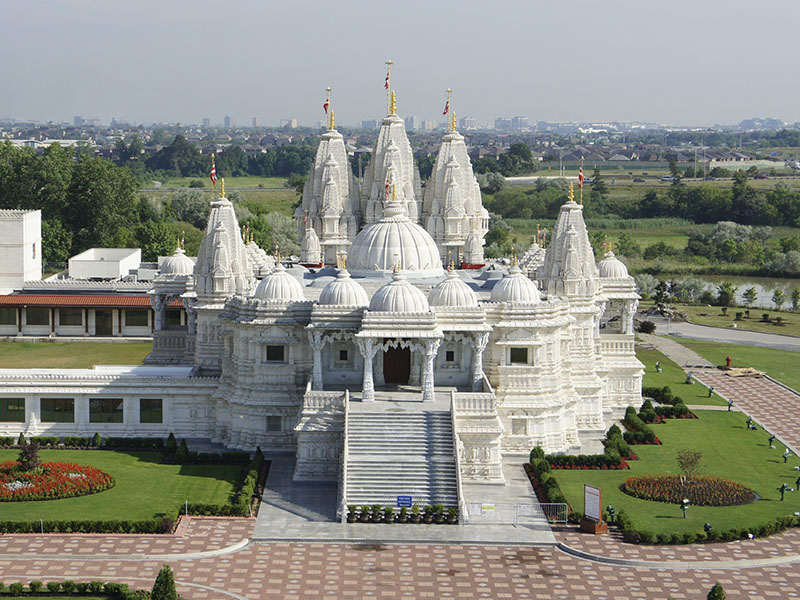
Opened in 2007 and carved from carrara marble, BAPS Shri Swaminarayan Mandir Toronto is a Hindu temple in the northwestern corner of Toronto dedicated to Vaishnavism.

Toronto has had an important Jewish community since the late 19th century. Originally, several synagogues were erected in the downtown, and a handful survive today. After the Second World War, the Jewish community recentred upon the Bathurst Street corridor. During the late 20th century and the early 21st century, a wide number of other religious groups have grown to considerable numbers in Toronto and constructed traditional religious structures in the city. Several mosques, as well as Buddhist and Hindu temples, have been built. One of the most notable is the Hindu BAPS Shri Swaminarayan Mandir Toronto, which opened in the northwest of the city in 2007 and is dedicated to Vaishnavism.

== Cultural architecture ==
Toronto has numerous theatre and sports venues. Many of these theatre and sports venues have naming rights sold to major corporations.

=== Theatre venues ===
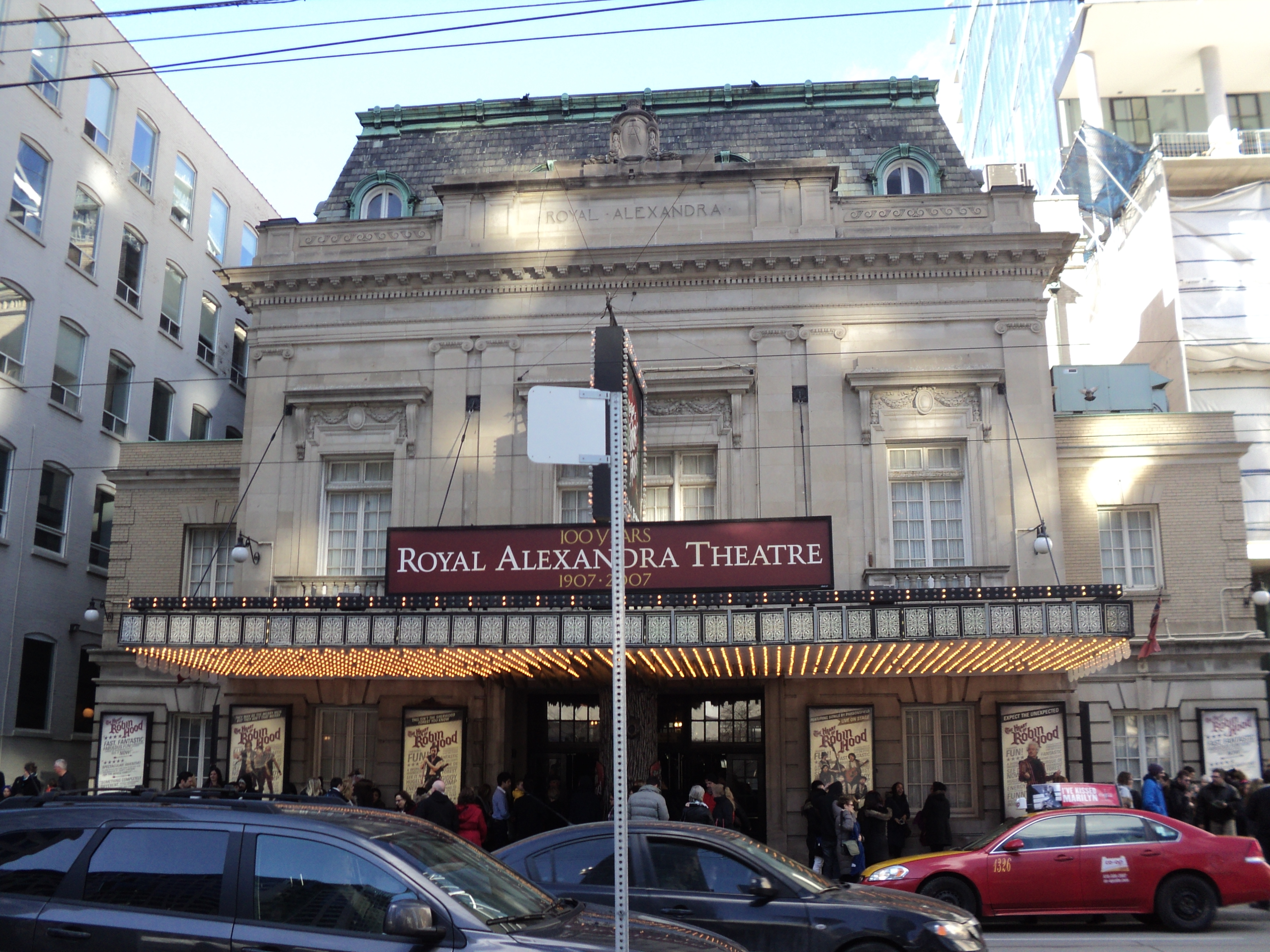
The Royal Alexandra Theatre was completed in 1909 and is an example of Beaux-Arts style of architecture common for theatres in early 20th century British Empire.

The city hosts a number of music theatres and venues, most notably Roy Thomson Hall. Designed by Canadian architects Arthur Erickson and Mathers and Haldenby, the 2630-seat Roy Thomson Hall opened in 1982 as the primary home of the Toronto Symphony Orchestra. The previous home of the Toronto Symphony Orchestra, Massey Hall, is the oldest musical theatre venue in Toronto, and remains in operation today. In June 2006, the Four Seasons Centre for the Performing Arts opened as the new home of the Canadian Opera Company and The National Ballet of Canada. Designed by Diamond + Schmitt, the 2,000 seat opera house has a European-style tiered horseshoe-shaped auditorium. It is the first structure in Canada specifically designed to house both opera and ballet with customized acoustics. Other musical theatres and concert venues in Toronto include the Danforth Music Hall, The Opera House, the RBC Amphitheatre (formerly Budweiser Stage and was opened as Molson Canadian Amphitheatre, which replaced The Forum), and Rogers Stadium.

The city also holds a number of live performance theatres including the Royal Alexandra Theatre, the oldest live performance theatre in North America. The Royal Alexandra's design was inspired by turn-of-the-century beaux-arts architectural styles, typical of British theatres. Other notable live performance venues include Elgin and Winter Garden Theatres, Ed Mirvish Theatre, Randolph Theatre, CAA Theatre, Princess of Wales Theatre, and the Meridian Hall (formerly the Sony Centre for the Performing Arts and the Hummingbird Centre and was opened as O'Keefe Centre).

=== Sports venues ===
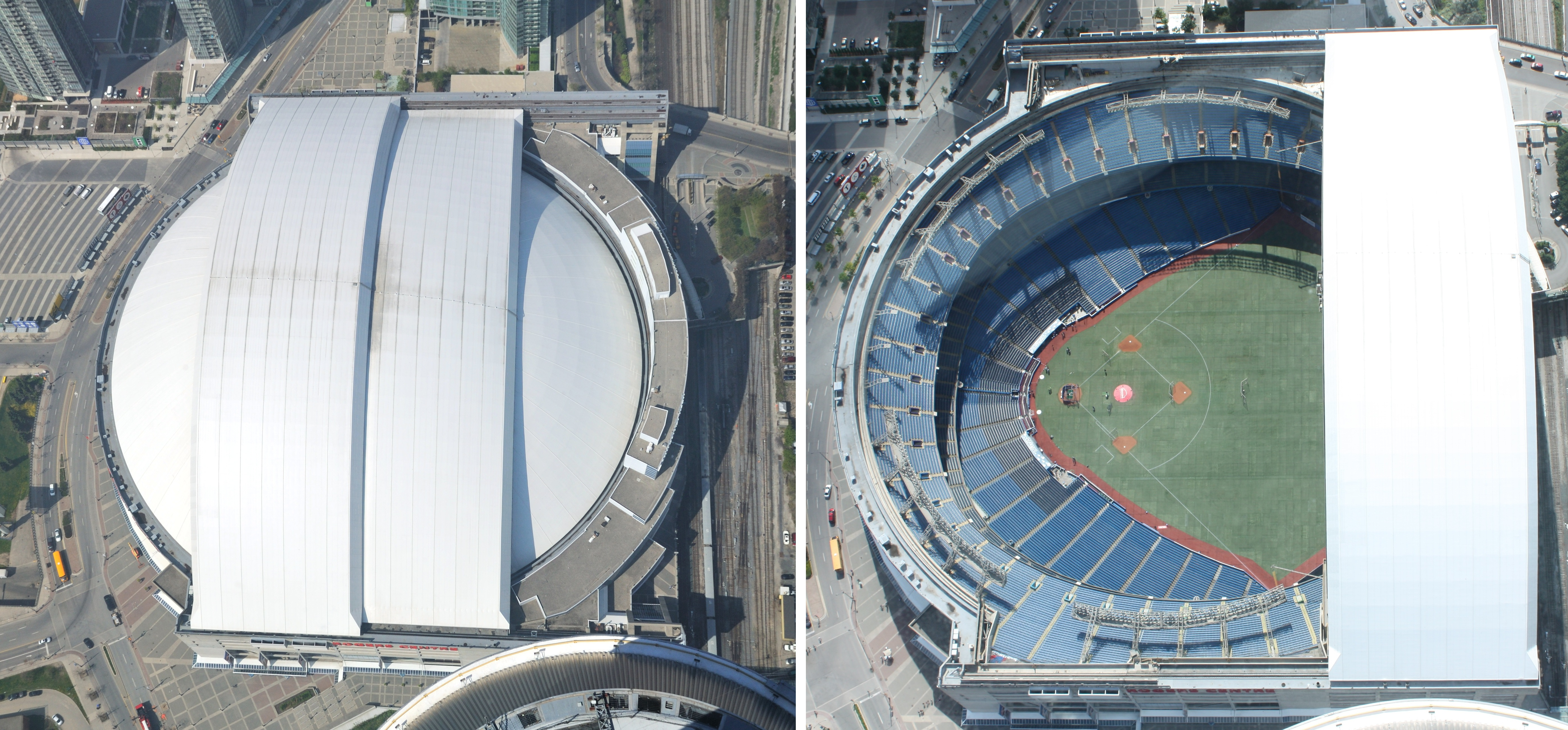
Left: Rogers Centre with roof closed Right: Rogers Centre with roof opened

Toronto is home to several sports venues, most notably the Rogers Centre (formerly SkyDome), the Scotiabank Arena (formerly Air Canada Centre), and BMO Field, which are all current venues. The Maple Leaf Gardens is perhaps Toronto's best-known former sporting venue, as it was the home of the Toronto Maple Leafs of the National Hockey League (NHL) for much of said team's history. The Gardens were later converted to a grocery and liquor store for the first two floors, respectively, as well as clothing on the second floor, and its upper floor, a smaller arena, the Mattamy Athletic Centre, for the TMU Bold hockey team of Toronto Metropolitan University (TMU), as well as for basketball matches in the 2015 Pan American Games.

Other sports venues in Toronto include the Coca-Cola Coliseum (formerly the Ricoh Coliseum and was opened as the CNE Coliseum), Lamport Stadium, and the Sobeys Stadium (formerly Rexall Centre then Aviva Centre).

The Golden Horseshoe (including Toronto) saw construction of new venues for the 2015 Pan American Games and the 2015 Parapan American Games, as well as renovations to existing venues. Permanent venues constructed for the Pan American Games include Toronto Pan Am Sports Centre at the University of Toronto Scarborough and the York Lions Stadium at York University.

== Transportation architecture ==
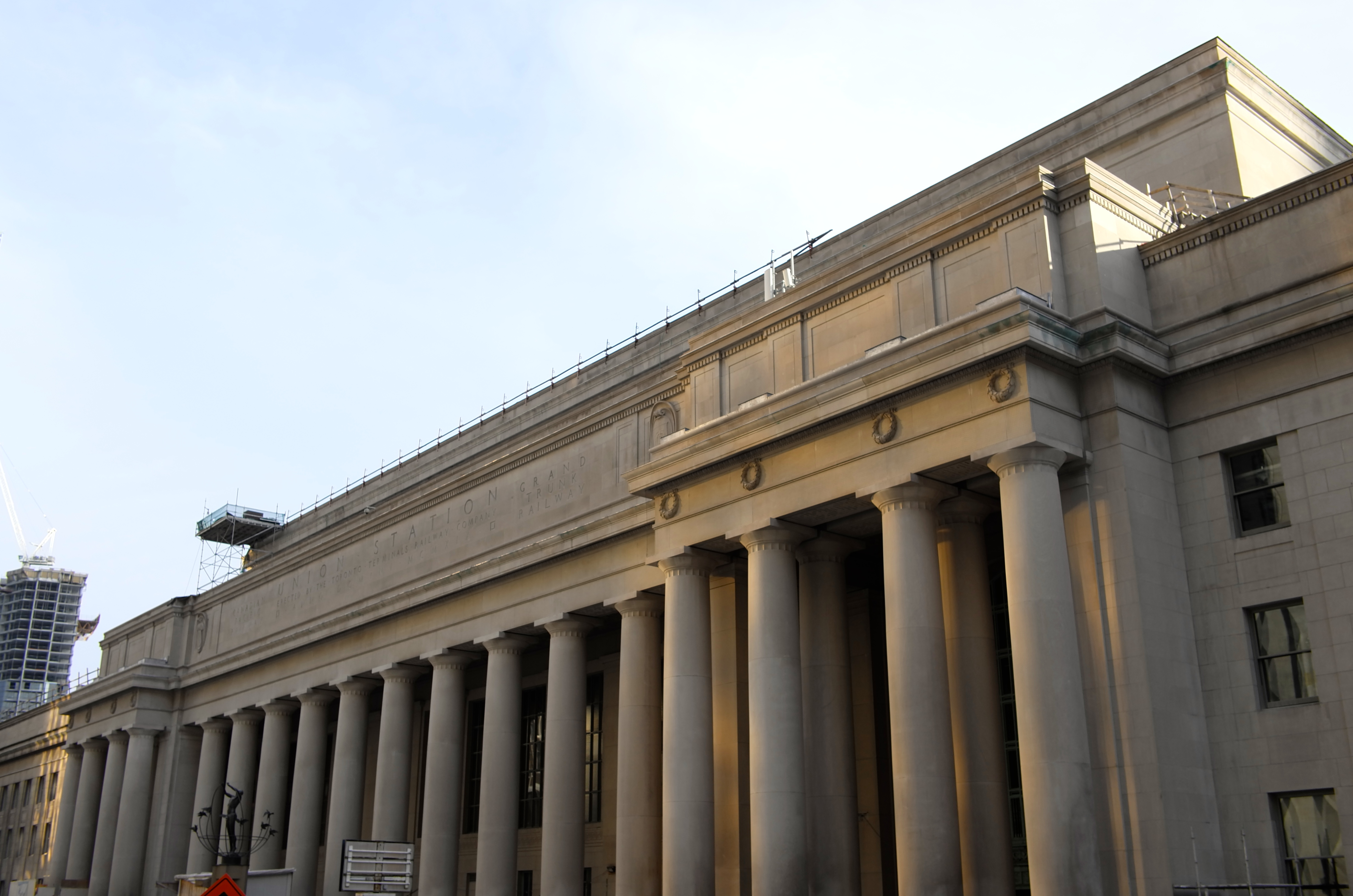
Designed in the Beaux-Art style, Union Station was completed in 1927.

Early subway stations in Toronto were utilitarian by design. The stations are typically described as "a series of bathrooms without plumbing", due to the extensive use of Vitrolite tiling for the original stations. Later subway stations were designed by notable architects, particularly with the Spadina section of Line 1 Yonge–University, as well as Line 4 Sheppard along the namesake avenue. The 2017 extension of the Spadina section of Line 1 to Vaughan Metropolitan Centre has unique architecture as well. The Spadina section later became part of the University section.

Museum station was renovated to resemble that of the Royal Ontario Museum's collection; its renovation was completed in 2008. Dufferin, Union, and Pape subway stations were renovated during the mid-2010s to add new artwork and in the case of Union station, a second platform was added as well, though not as a Spanish solution. Many other stations also have public artworks within them.

The Toronto subway system primarily uses the unique Toronto Subway typeface for station names.

Completed in 1927, Toronto Union Station is the main passenger railway terminal in the city.

The Prince Edward Viaduct is among the most notable bridges of Toronto; its lower deck holds Line 2 Bloor–Danforth.

== Landmarks ==
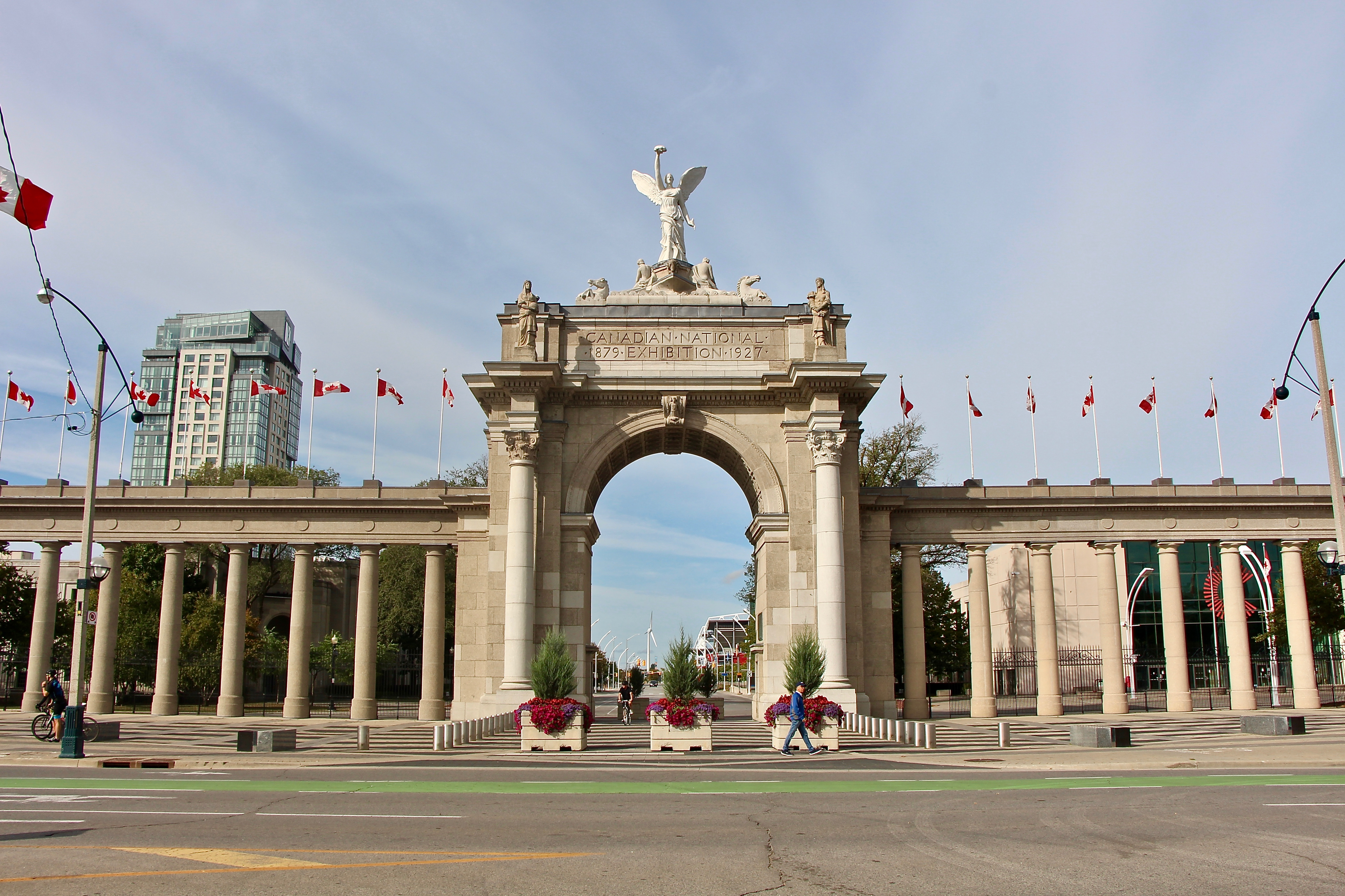
Completed in 1927, Princes' Gates is a neoclassical-style triumphal arch located at the eastern end of Exhibition Place.

The most prominent landmark in Toronto, and its best-known symbol, is the CN Tower. It was the world's tallest free-standing structure for 31 years from its completion in 1975 until Burj Khalifa in Dubai, United Arab Emirates surpassed it in 2007; it remains the tallest free-standing tower in the Western Hemisphere. The CN Tower is used as an observation tower and a communications tower. Another landmark structure is Casa Loma. Constructed by E. J. Lennox during the early 1910s, it is a Gothic revival-style castle located on Walmer and Davenport roads overlooking the escarpment. It was originally the residence of Sir Henry Pellatt, a Canadian financier and soldier. The city later took over the castle when Pellatt could no longer afford to keep it due to being unable to pay the increased property taxes and was forced to leave in 1923. The building presently operates as a historic house museum.

The Princes' Gates is a neoclassical-style triumphal arch monumental gateway at Exhibition Place. It was built to commemorate the 60th anniversary of Canadian Confederation and was to be named The Diamond Jubilee of Confederation Gates. The structure's name was changed when it was learned that Edward, Prince of Wales and Prince George were travelling to Toronto. The princes cut the ribbon on the structure on August 30, 1927. Princes' Gate was designed by local architectural firm Chapman and Oxley.

== See also ==
- Architecture of Canada
- Canadian property bubble
- Doors Open Toronto
- Manhattanization
- Strawberry box house
- TOBuilt database
- UrbanToronto database
- List of fake buildings in Toronto
- List of lost buildings and structures in Toronto
- List of oldest buildings and structures in Toronto
- List of tallest buildings in Toronto

== Bibliography ==
- Arthur, Eric. Toronto, No Mean City. University of Toronto Press, 1964
- Cruikshank, Tom. Old Toronto Houses. Toronto: Firefly Books, 2003.
- Denby William and William Kilbourn. Toronto Observed. Toronto: Oxford University Press, 1986.
- Fulford, Robert. Accidental City: The Transformation of Toronto.
- Kalman, Harold D. A History of Canadian Architecture. Toronto: Oxford University Press, 1994.
- Robertson, J. Ross (John Ross). Landmarks of Toronto. Toronto: J. Ross Robertson, 1894.
