= John Irwin House =

Coordinates: 43.661826°N 79.384045°W

Extraordinary measures were taken to preserve the John Irwin House when the block it was on was redeveloped.

The John Irwin House is a historic structure located in Toronto, one of the oldest surviving residential buildings in its neighbourhood. The house is listed on the City of Toronto government's registry of historic properties. The city describes the house as being an example of Second Empire style. The house is located at 21 Grenville Street. That part of the city, east of Queen's Park, was opened for residential development in 1860, and the house was recorded on city records as being owned by John Irwin in 1873.

Enzo di Matteo, writing in Now, included the house in a profile of 15 historic properties that were nevertheless under threat of demolition.

In the winter of 2012, a rear wing of the house was demolished.

In 2012, 2013, and 2014, the block surrounding the house was redeveloped into a 50-story highrise, and extraordinary steps were taken to preserve the John Irwin House. The house was temporarily moved to a concrete platform, supported by deep piles that extended through what would be several underground floors, to bedrock. When the highrise is complete, the historic house will be repurposed as commercial space.

In a profile of the development, in January 2017, Urban Toronto reported that the John Irwin House was expected to become a restaurant.
