= Fugly =

Fugly may refer to:

== Film and TV ==
- Fugly, a 2007 film directed by Todd Holland
- Fugly!, a 2014 film directed by Alfredo De Villa
- Fugly (film), a 2014 Hindi language film

== Other ==
- Fugly Awards, the former name of the Pug Awards, an architecture award for Toronto buildings

== See also ==
- Search for all Wikipedia articles containing "fugly"
