= Pug (nickname) =

Pug is a nickname of:

- Walden L. Ainsworth (1886–1960), US Navy World War II vice admiral
- Pug Bennett (1874–1935), American Major League Baseball player
- Pug Cavet (1889–1966), American Major League Baseball player
- Russell Daugherity (1902–1971), American football player
- Peter George Davis (1923–2011), British Second World War Royal Marines lieutenant colonel
- Pug Griffin (1896–1951), American Major League Baseball player
- Hastings Ismay, 1st Baron Ismay (1887–1965), British general and Winston Churchill's chief military adviser in the Second World War
- Pug Lund (1913–1994), American football player, member of the College Football Hall of Fame
- Clarence "Pug" Manders (1913–1985), American National Football League running back
- Alex Pourteau (born 1969), professional wrestler nicknamed "The Pug"
- Pug Rentner (1910–1978), American National Football League halfback and quarterback
- Pug Southerland (1911–1949), United States Navy World War II flying ace
- Charles Upham (1908–1994), New Zealand captain twice awarded the Victoria Cross during the Second World War
- Pug Vaughan (1911–1964), American National Football League player
