= TOBuilt =

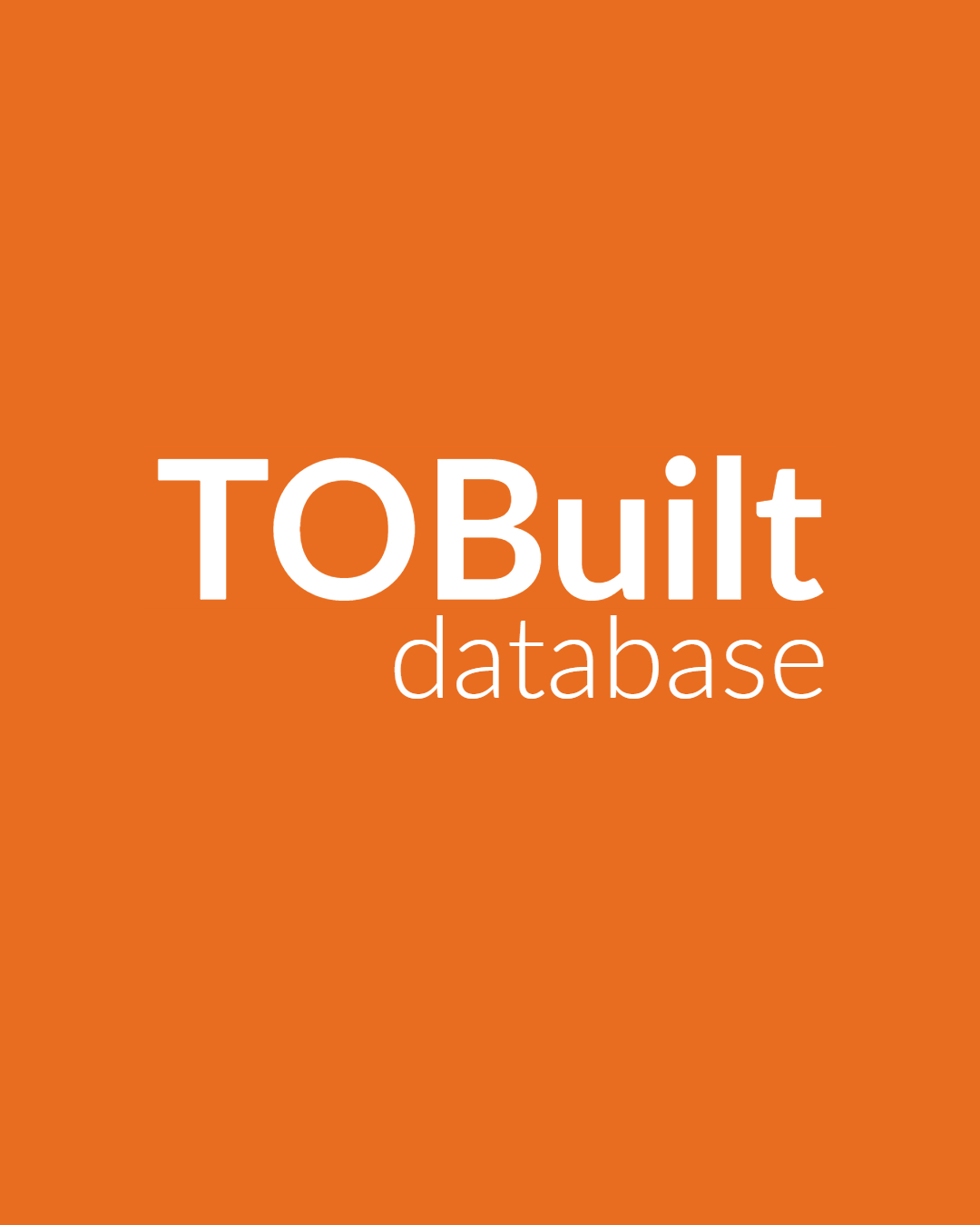
TOBuilt's logo

TOBuilt is a digital, crowd-sourced database of buildings, structures, heritage sites, and human-made landscapes in Toronto, Ontario, Canada maintained by the Toronto branch of the Architectural Conservancy of Ontario. The database's initial catalogue was created by Robert Krawczyk in 2006. In 2015, ACO Toronto assumed the operation of TOBuilt and relaunched it on a new platform. As of December 2023, TOBuilt maintains entries for over 15,000 sites located across the city of Toronto.

== Database content ==
TOBuilt's central mandate is to document architecture and built heritage throughout Toronto's six boroughs: Old Toronto, North York, East York, York, Etobicoke, and Scarborough. Individual entries contain present and historical photographs of the site in question as well as information about its date of construction, architect, designer, creator, cultural history, architectural style, level of heritage designation, and location. Historical architectural styles that are highly represented in the database include Gothic Revival, Italianate, Second Empire, Queen Anne Revival, Edwardian, and Arts and Crafts. It also documents the use of early 19th-century English architectural styles in the city, including surviving Georgian, Regency, and Neoclassical buildings, as well as those representing modern styles such as Brutalism. TOBuilt has documented various historical Indigenous sites across Toronto.

TOBuilt has conducted several extensive surveys of architectural typologies in Toronto, including of missing middle architecture, places of worship, and schools. In 2022, TOBuilt completed a first-of-its-kind research project documenting over 2,000 detached suburban houses, including Victory Houses, built between 1940 and 2000 in North York, Etobicoke, and Scarborough. The database also maintains an updated list of "at-risk" buildings in the city that are currently threatened by demolition, redevelopment, neglect, or alteration, and most recently by provincial Bill 23.

== Architectural advocacy ==
In February 2021, the owner of a 3-storey Second Empire building designed by Scottish architect David Brash Dick in 1878 at 127 Strachan Avenue in Toronto's West End Niagara neighbourhood withdrew a demolition application after advocacy efforts led by TOBuilt. The project centred around a TOBuilt Instagram campaign and an online petition garnering nearly 5,000 signatures.
