= Pug Awards =

Former Canadian architecture awards

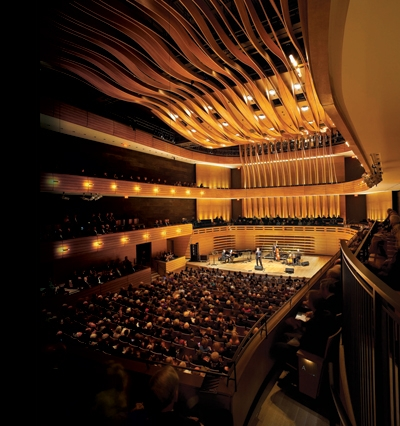
Koerner Hall, part of the 2010s winning Telus Centre project

The Pug Awards were a Toronto architecture award that rated buildings based on popular votes, awarded annually from 2004 to 2014. Each spring, the Pug Awards website listed all buildings completed the previous year in Toronto that either had more than 50,000 feet of floor space or were deemed noteworthy by the Pug Awards Advisory Board and Executive Committee, with voters able to “Love”, “Like” or “Hate” new developments. In 2009, buildings outside the Old City of Toronto (including North York and Etobicoke) became eligible for awards.

The awards were founded in 2004 by Gary Berman, president of real estate financier Tricon Capital Group, and Anna Simone, principal of design firm Cecconi Simone. They were originally named the "Fugly Awards" and highlighted the ugliest buildings completed, but the name was then softened to the Puglies, and finally to the Pugs, with a Pug dog as the mascot.

In 2008 the awards introduced the "Pug Cup", which was carved each year with the winning building and displayed at City Hall.

The goal of the award was to inform the public about excellent designs and contribute to the growth of Toronto.

== 2014 awards ==
- Best residential: River City
- Best commercial/institutional: Bridgepoint Active Healthcare
- Paul Oberman Award commercial/institutional: Bridgepoint Active Healthcare

== 2013 awards ==
- Best residential: 500 Wellington West
- Best commercial/institutional: 11 Division, Toronto Police Services
- Paul Oberman Award commercial/institutional: 11 Division, Toronto Police Services
- Worst residential: Palais at Port Royal Place
- Worst commercial/institutional: Trump International Hotel & Tower

== 2012 awards ==
- Best residential: 83 Redpath
- Best commercial/institutional: The Centre for Green Cities, Evergreen Brick Works
- Paul Oberman Award commercial/institutional: The Shops of Summerhill
- Worst residential: Pearl Condominium
- Worst commercial/institutional: Toronto Rehab University Centre, Patient Care & Research Tower

== 2011 awards ==
- Best residential: Seventy5 Portland
- Best commercial/institutional: Bell Lightbox
- Paul Oberman Award commercial/institutional: Bloor/Gladstone Library
- Paul Oberman Award residential: The Printing Factory Lofts
- Worst residential: Eleven Christie
- Worst commercial/institutional: Scarborough Gospel Temple

== 2010 awards ==
- Best residential: 60 Richmond East Housing Co-Operative
- Best commercial/institutional: Telus Centre at The Royal Conservatory of Music
- Worst residential: Grande Triomphe – Phase II
- Worst commercial/institutional: Shops at Don Mills

== 2009 awards ==
- Best residential: One Saint Thomas - Robert A.M. Stern
- Best commercial/institutional: Art Gallery of Ontario - Frank Gehry
- Worst residential: Hampton Plaza
- Worst commercial/institutional: Mount Sinai Hospital Joseph & Wolf Lebovic Centre

== 2008 awards ==
- Best residential: Argyle Authentic Lofts
- Best commercial/institutional: Hazelton Hotel
- Worst residential: 76 Shuter
- Worst commercial/institutional: Marriott Residence Inn

== 2007 awards ==
- Best residential: One King West
- Best commercial/institutional: Gardiner Museum
- Worst residential: Be Bloor Condominium
- Worst commercial/institutional: Ryerson School of Business

== 2006 awards ==
- Best residential: 18 Yorkville
- Best commercial/institutional: National Ballet School of Canada
- Worst residential: Glenlake
- Worst commercial/institutional: Cosmopolitan Hotel

== 2005 awards ==
- Best residential: Waterclub I
- Best commercial/institutional: Toronto Police Service's 51 Division
- Worst residential: Wellington Square
- Worst commercial/institutional: Queen Elizabeth Centre (Toronto Rehab)

== See also ==
- Architecture of Toronto
