= The Edwin =

Building in Toronto, Ontario, Canada

Coordinates: 43.658527°N 79.35214°W

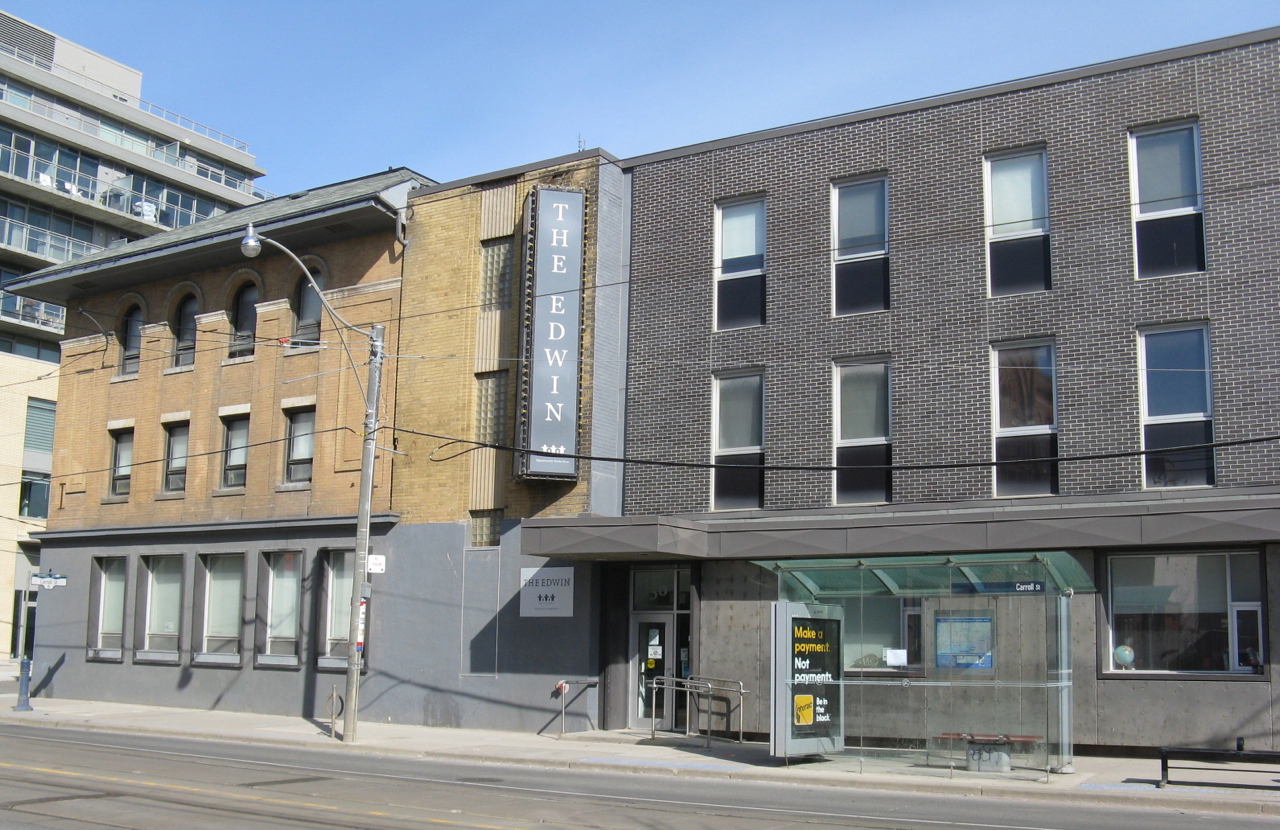
The Edwin, seen from Queen Street East

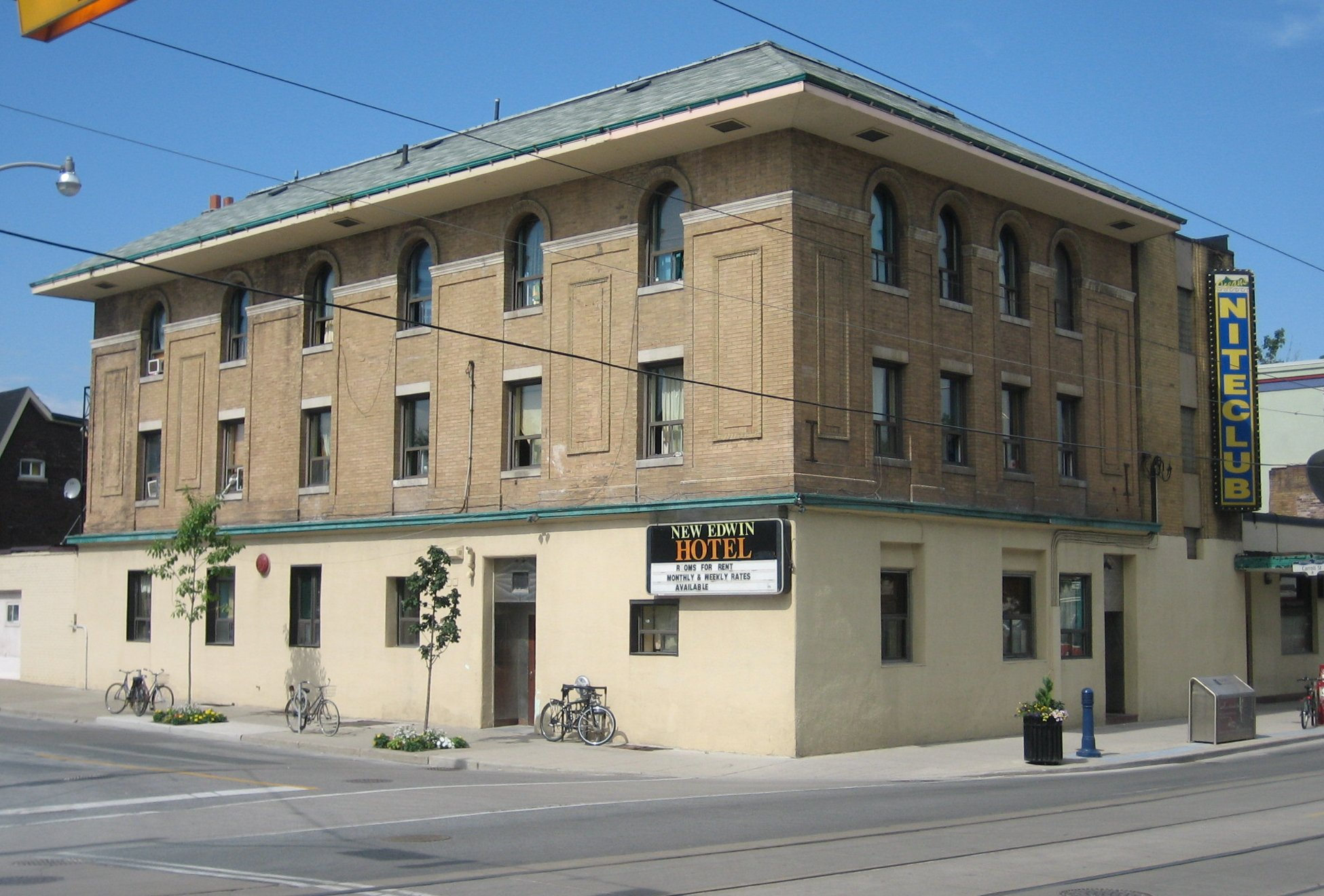
The New Edwin Hotel, 2007

The Edwin is a three-storey building in Toronto, Ontario, Canada operated by WoodGreen Community Services to provide community housing. It incorporates the former New Edwin Hotel, built in 1905 to serve as a hotel for railway passengers coming from a now closed railway station at the foot of the Don Valley. It is located at the intersection of Queen Street East and Carroll Street, east of the Don River, in the Riverside subdistrict of South Riverdale.

In 2010 it reopened to provide transitional housing for homeless senior men for a project called "First Step to Home", and was renamed "The Edwin".

== History ==
The once dignified hotel for several decades was a seedy home for rent with daily and weekly rates. A portion of the lower floor was a nightclub.

On April 1, 2008, it was purchased by WoodGreen Community Services for housing, and in March 2010 their non-profit housing program "First Steps To Home" opened. As a housing-first model, this housing was designed specifically to provide accommodation for street-involved and homeless men aged 55+. It has 28 self-contained units that provide "transitional housing" to fill the gap between a homeless shelter and permanent social housing. Residents also receive support through a life-transition program to economic self-sufficiency by gaining new skills, training, and jobs through partnerships with other social service agencies and a number of major corporations.
