= UrbanToronto =

Urban development forum for Toronto, Canada

UrbanToronto is a website that covers various urban development topics within the city of Toronto, Ontario, Canada. In 2017, the website received over 2 million page views and 225,000 unique users every month, and had over 15,500 registered members.

The website features forums dedicated to development in Toronto, where enthusiasts discuss various projects, offer opinions, and share pictures of developments in progress. New development information and illustrations are often shared in the forums before their official release. The website's forums have also influenced revisions to development proposals in response to comments and discussion. The website also features a database and interactive map of different urban developments, which is integrated with the forums.

UrbanToronto was founded by Ryan Delrue, who started it as a hobby in 2002 and whose Forum handle was 'billy corgan19982'. The site quickly grew with additional members, and became a community of people interested in architecture design, transportation infrastructure, construction and Toronto's built form, and the culture of Toronto and the politics of Toronto and its surrounding areas. While the forum provided large amounts of disorganized information, the site was purchased by Edward Skira and Nada Laskovski in 2008, who then added an editorial section in 2010 to highlight key information. Craig White, whose forum handle is @interchange42, has been the Managing Editor ever since. The website started conducting outreach to development and public relations firms within the industry, and also offered third-party advertising. The website functions as a combination of these two streams of information: information provided by members, and information researched and obtained by website staff. The website is now regarded as a public and customer relations tool for developers, as well as a research source for investors.

The format of UrbanToronto was transferred to another sister website, SkyriseCities, covering urban development around the world.

UrbanToronto's format has been copied for various Australian cities (originally just Melbourne).
