= RBC WaterPark Place =

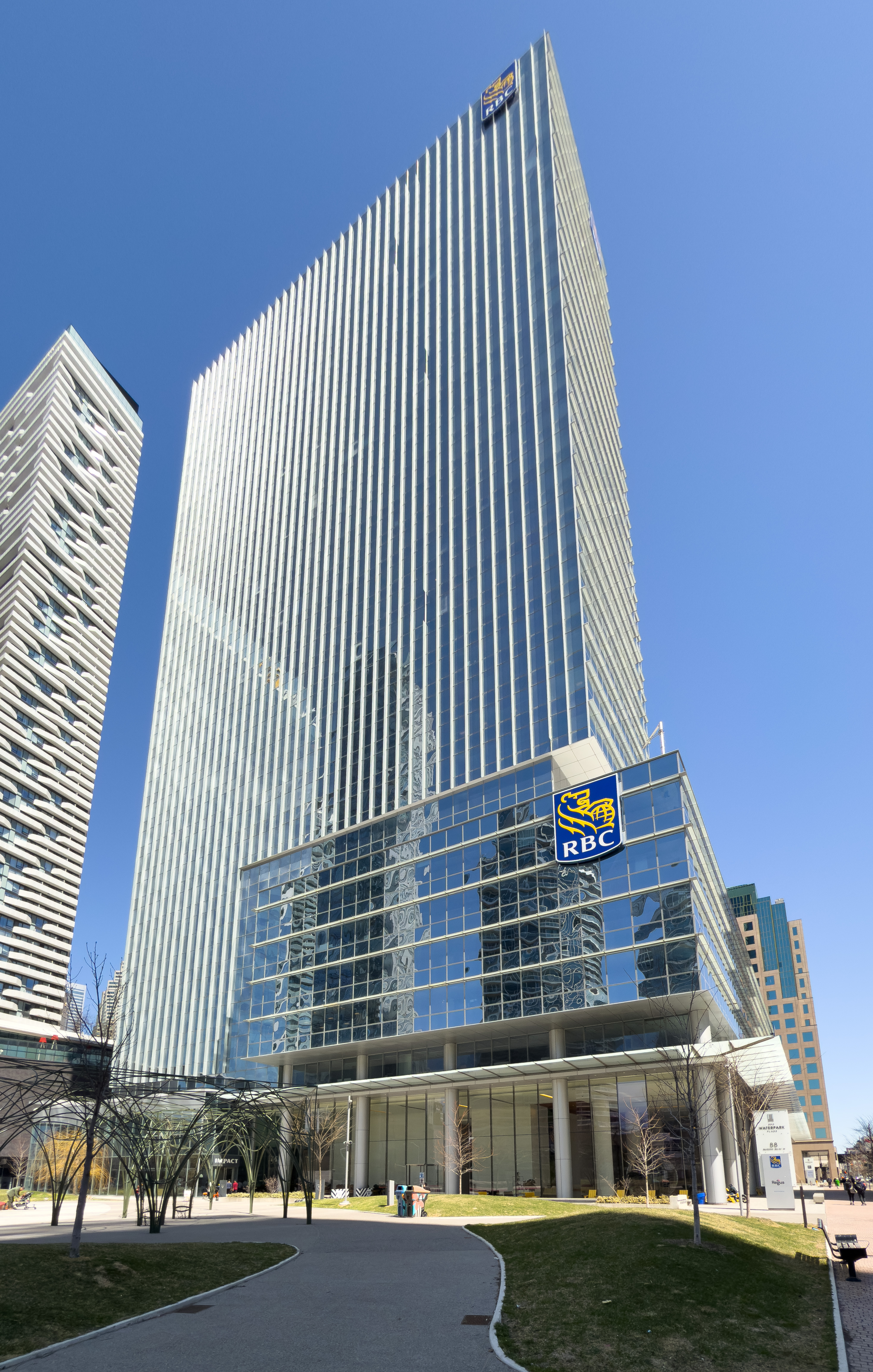
- RBC WaterPark Place
- Interactive map of the RBC WaterPark Place area
- Alternative names: WaterPark Place

General information
- Status: Completed
- Type: Commercial offices
- Location: 88 Queens Quay West, Toronto, Ontario
- Coordinates: 43°38′27.7″N 79°22′45.1″W
- Completed: 2014
- Owner: Oxford Properties

Height
- Roof: 140 metres (460 ft)
- Top floor: 31

Technical details
- Floor count: 30
- Lifts/elevators: 16 (1–22); 8 (23–30)

Design and construction
- Architect: WZMH Architects
- Developer: Oxford Properties

References
- RBC WaterPark Place

RBC WaterPark Place is an office complex designed by WZMH Architects and located at 88 Queens Quay West in Toronto, Canada.

Home to the Royal Bank of Canada, it features a 31-storey tower with 930,000 square feet (86,000 m^{2}) of space and developed by Oxford Properties outside the traditional financial core of the city. The tower began construction in 2011 and was completed in 2014. When proposed the building was to have taken over head office operations from Royal Bank Plaza and now houses some of the bank's operations.

== WaterPark Place I and II ==
The complex also consists of the twin WaterPark Place, a pair of office towers at 10 Bay Street (18 floors, c. 1990) and 20 Bay Street (24 floors, c. 1986) and connected to Union Station via PATH network.

== See also ==
- Royal Bank Plaza, Toronto – corporate headquarters of RBC
- RBC Centre, Toronto – home to RBC operations in the GTA
- Place Ville Marie, Montreal – former headquarters of RBC and retained for the bank's head office and other RBC operations in Montreal
- CIBC Square, Toronto – head office of CIBC
- Royal Bank Building (Toronto)
