= Toronto Underground =

Toronto Underground may refer to:

- PATH (Toronto), network of underground pedestrian tunnels in Toronto, Canada
- Toronto subway, rapid transit system in Toronto, Canada
