= RBC Centre (disambiguation) =

RBC Centre is an office tower in Toronto, Ontario, Canada.

RBC Centre or RBC Center may also refer to the following:

- RBC Center, an arena in Raleigh, North Carolina, United States, now known as Lenovo Center
- RBC Centre (Sarnia), an arena in Sarnia, Ontario, Canada, now known as Progressive Auto Sales Arena
