= RBC Centre =

Skyscraper in Toronto, Canada

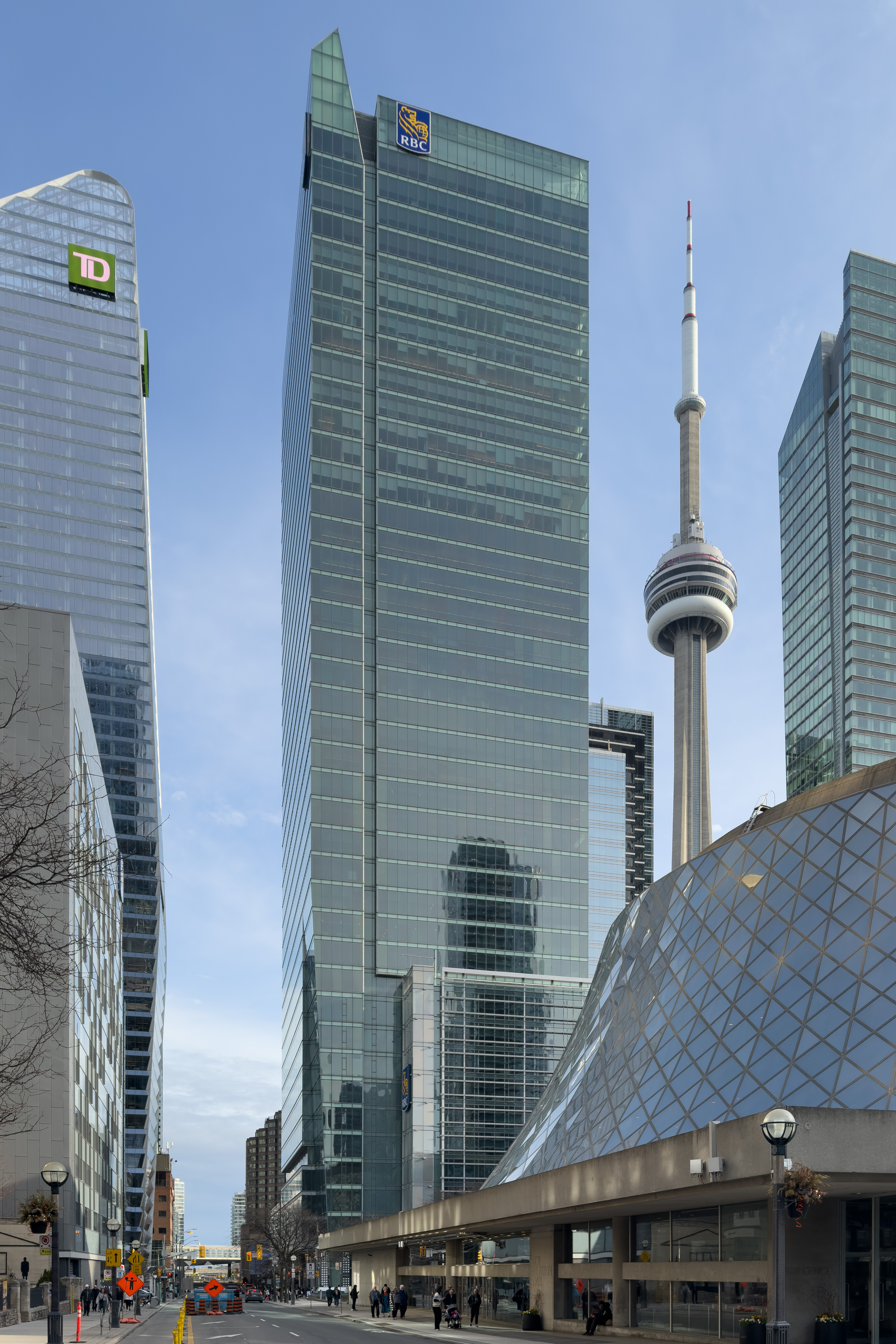
- Alternative names: RBC Dexia Building

General information
- Type: Commercial offices
- Location: 155 Wellington Street West; Toronto, Ontario; M5V 3H6
- Coordinates: 43°38′44″N 79°23′09″W
- Construction started: 2006
- Completed: 2009
- Owner: Cadillac Fairview/ ONTREA (50%); Ontario Pension Board (50%)
- Operator: Cadillac Fairview

Height
- Roof: 185 m (607 ft)

Technical details
- Floor count: 43
- Floor area: 112,900 m^{2} (1,215,000 sq ft)
- Lifts/elevators: 30

Design and construction
- Architects: Kohn Pedersen Fox; Bregman + Hamann Architects; Sweeny Sterling Finlayson & Co Architects
- Developer: Cadillac Fairview
- Main contractor: PCL Construction

RBC Centre, also known as the RBC Dexia Building, is an office tower in Toronto, Ontario, Canada. Unlike the corporate offices of other Canadian financial institutions, the RBC Centre is outside of Toronto's Financial District. It has been owned and managed by Cadillac Fairview Corporation jointly with the Ontario Pension Board since 2012. The building is connected to the PATH.

RBC Centre's anchor tenant is the Royal Bank of Canada. The bank maintains a presence in several other towers in the city's downtown core, including Royal Bank Plaza at Bay Street and Front Street, the Royal Bank Building at 20 King Street West adjacent to Scotia Plaza, RBC WaterPark Place and the building complex at 310, 315, 320 and 330 Front Street West, next to the Metro Toronto Convention Centre.

The development achieved Leadership in Energy and Environmental Design (LEED) gold status for the project's environmental sustainability and will produce an estimated 50% energy savings relative to buildings built to the Canadian National Energy Code. The LEED rating system recognizes leading-edge buildings that incorporate design, construction and operational practices that combine healthy, high-quality and high-performance advantages with reduced environmental impacts.

In 2011, Toronto Star architecture critic Christopher Hume named the RBC Centre and the neighbouring Ritz-Carlton Toronto as the two most beautiful buildings completed in the 21st century in Toronto. He praised their integration into the community, and how they have revived Wellington Street.

== See also ==
- List of tallest buildings in Canada
- List of tallest buildings in Toronto
