= Sheraton Centre Toronto Hotel =

Building in Toronto, Canada

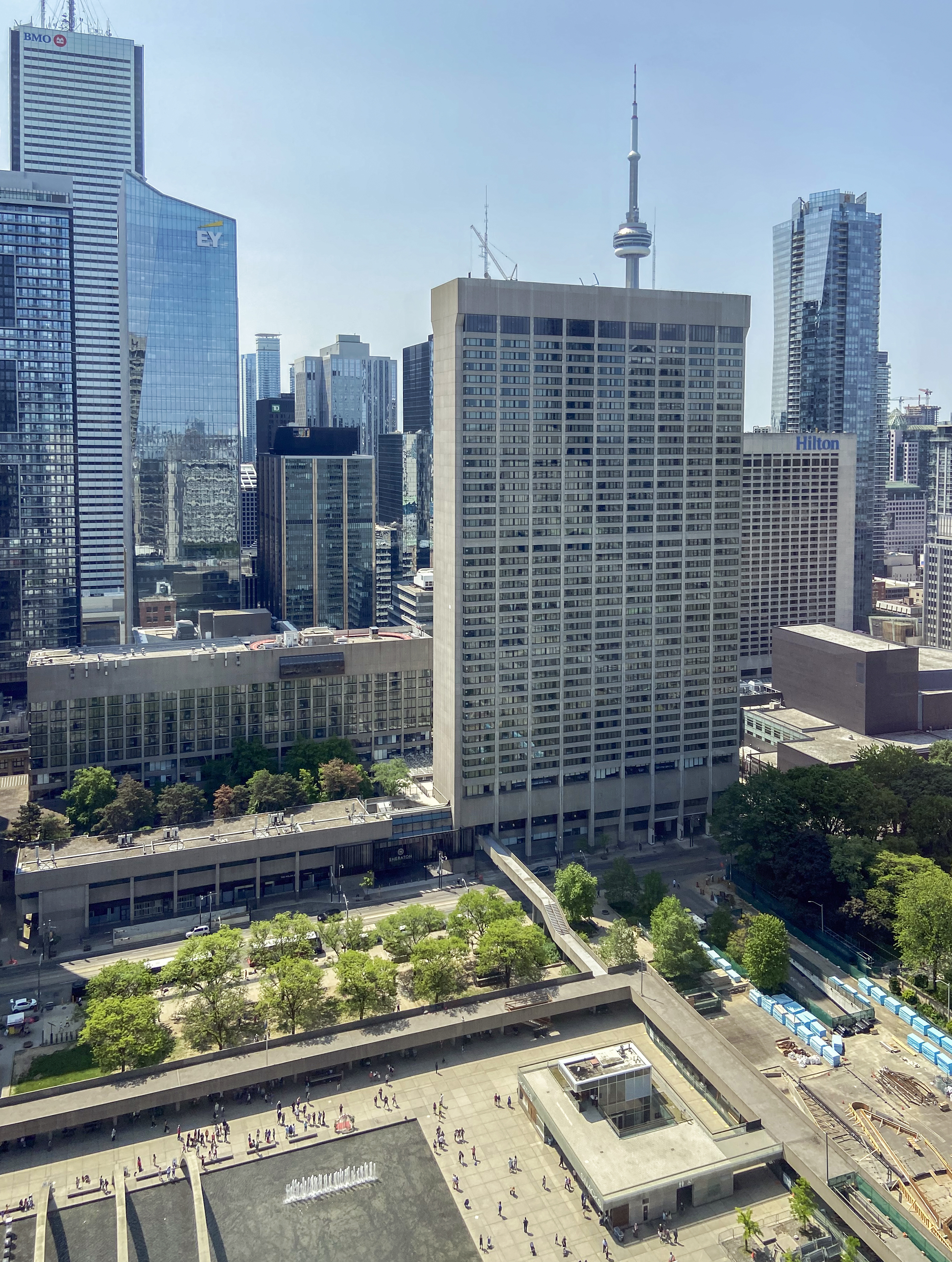
- Interactive map of the Sheraton Centre Toronto Hotel area

General information
- Location: Toronto, Ontario, Canada, 123 Queen Street West
- Coordinates: 43°39′04″N 79°23′03″W
- Construction started: 1970
- Completed: 1972

Height
- Roof: 135 m (443 ft)

Technical details
- Floor count: 43

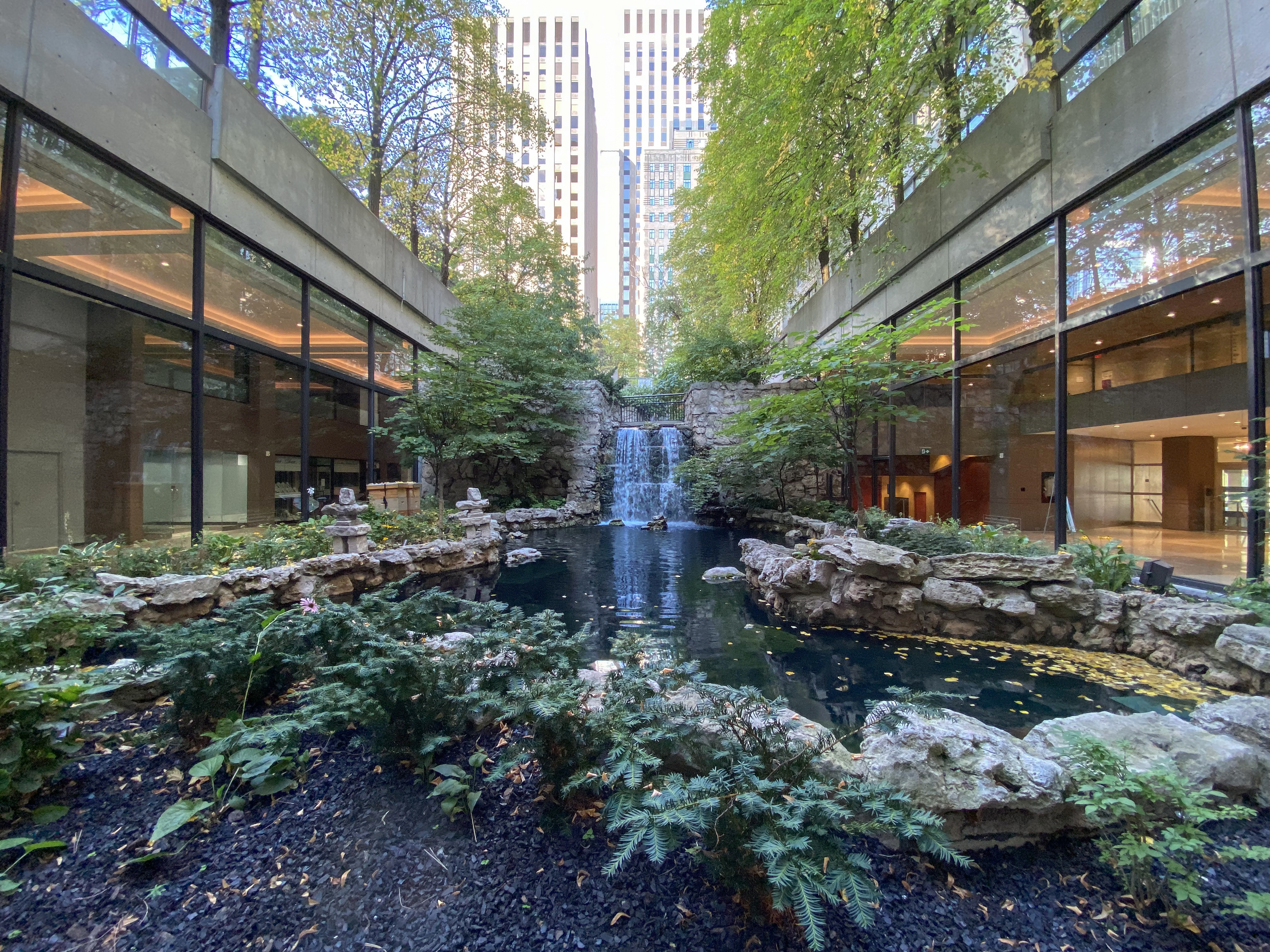
Courtyard waterfall

The Sheraton Centre Toronto Hotel is a 1300-room, 43-story hotel in Downtown Toronto, Ontario, Canada, opened in 1972. It is the second-tallest all-hotel building in Toronto, after the Delta Toronto Hotel.

== History ==
The hotel opened on October 16, 1972 as the Four Seasons Sheraton Hotel, a joint venture between Sheraton and Toronto businessman Issy Sharp's Four Seasons chain. At the time, it was the second-largest hotel in Toronto, behind only the Royal York Hotel. Sharp was unhappy with the partnership, and sold his 49 percent share in the hotel in 1976 for CA$18,500,000 (equivalent to $97,675,241 in 2025), and it was renamed The Sheraton Centre of Toronto. The name has since been modified slightly to the Sheraton Centre Toronto Hotel. Marriott International, Sheraton's parent company, sold the hotel to Brookfield Asset Management in 2017 for CA$335 million.

The new hotel was built as part of an urban renewal project connected to the Toronto City Hall and Nathan Phillips Square project. The site of the Sheraton was considered a "commercial slum" with two burlesque theatres, pawn shops and a cinema. The site was expropriated by the City of Toronto in 1964 and the site cleared in 1965. The site was later sold for the construction of the Four Seasons Sheraton Hotel.

The hotel was a host venue for the World Hockey Summit in 2010.

== Description ==
The hotel consists of three connected buildings located between Queen, York, and Richmond streets: the three-floor entrance, the eleven-floor building on Richmond Street, and the main building, which has 43 floors and faces Queen Street, looking directly at the Toronto City Hall.

The project was developed by John B. Parkin Associates. The hotel's design was a collaboration between the City Hall's architects, Parkin and Associates, Seppo Valjus, and Searle, Wlibee, and Rowland. Its concrete exterior was designed to match the City Hall in colour and texture.

The inner yard contains a landscaped garden with a waterfall, which was designed by a Canadian architect, J. Austin Floyd. The hotel has 171,716 sq ft of total event space, the largest hotel convention facilities in Toronto, including a ballroom with a capacity of 3500. The hotel lobby serves as one of the nodes of the PATH network of pedestrian tunnels. There was a two screen cinema on the lower level until the 1990s. The hotel is connected to the square by a walk bridge over Queen Street West. The transmitter for CIRR-FM is located atop the hotel.

== Family, Business and Leisure Travel ==
The Sheraton Centre Toronto Hotel is designed to accommodate a wide range of travellers, including families, business guests, and those combining work with leisure ("bleisure").

For families, the hotel offers amenities such as a year-round heated indoor/outdoor swimming pool, as well as family-oriented programming during select periods, including children's activities and entertainment. The property also features dedicated spaces for younger guests, including a playroom known as "The Clubhouse", and family-friendly services such as connecting rooms and in-room dining options which can be tailored to children.

A key feature of the hotel is its indoor/outdoor pool, which is among the largest of its kind in downtown Toronto & open all year, snow or shine. The pool spans approximately 25 metres and allows guests to swim between indoor and outdoor sections through a glass partition, remaining open year-round with temperatures typically maintained between 25 °C and 28 °C.

Business travellers are supported by extensive meeting and conference facilities, including more than 130,000 square feet of event space, a business centre, and flexible workspaces throughout the property. Its location in Toronto's financial district and proximity to the PATH network provide convenient access to offices, transit, and key commercial hubs.

For leisure travellers, the hotel is centrally located near major attractions such as the CN Tower, Rogers Centre, and the city's entertainment and theatre districts. Its central location is also expected to support increased visitor demand during major international events hosted in Toronto, including matches associated with the 2026 FIFA World Cup.

The combination of these amenities and its central location makes the Sheraton Centre Toronto Hotel a versatile destination for a variety of travel purposes.

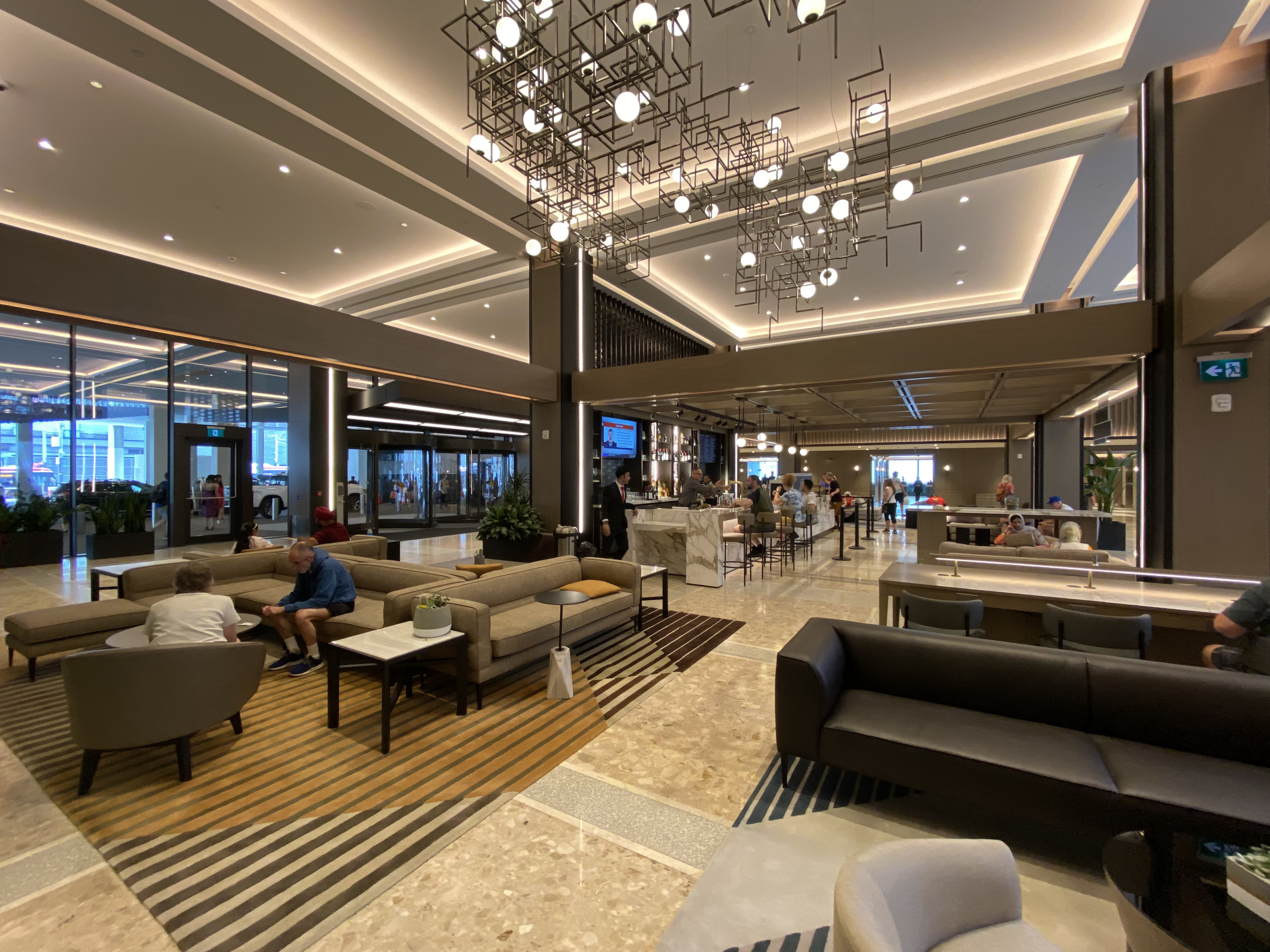
Hotel lobby after renovation in 2021

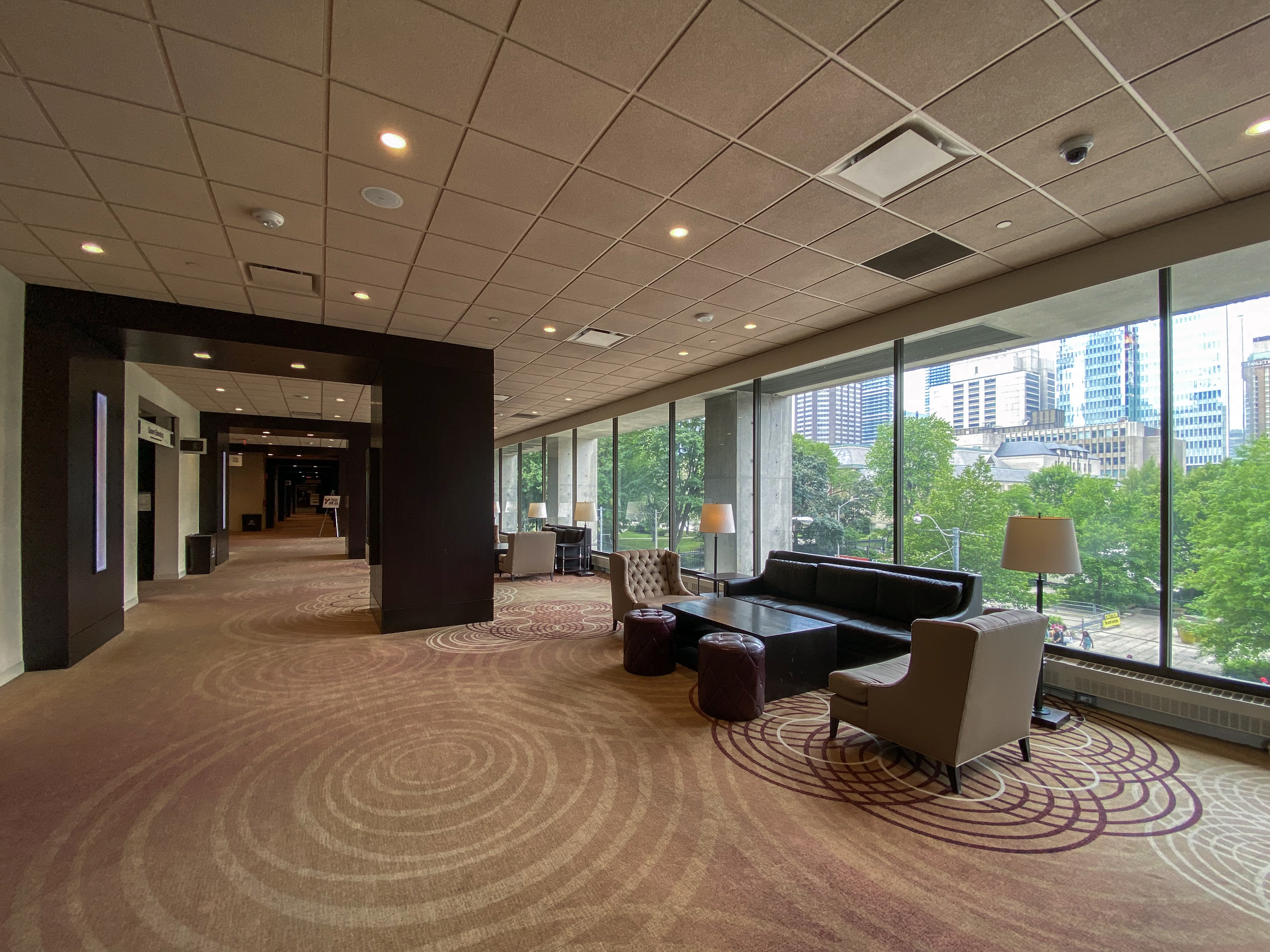
Hotel Ballroom lobby in Level 2

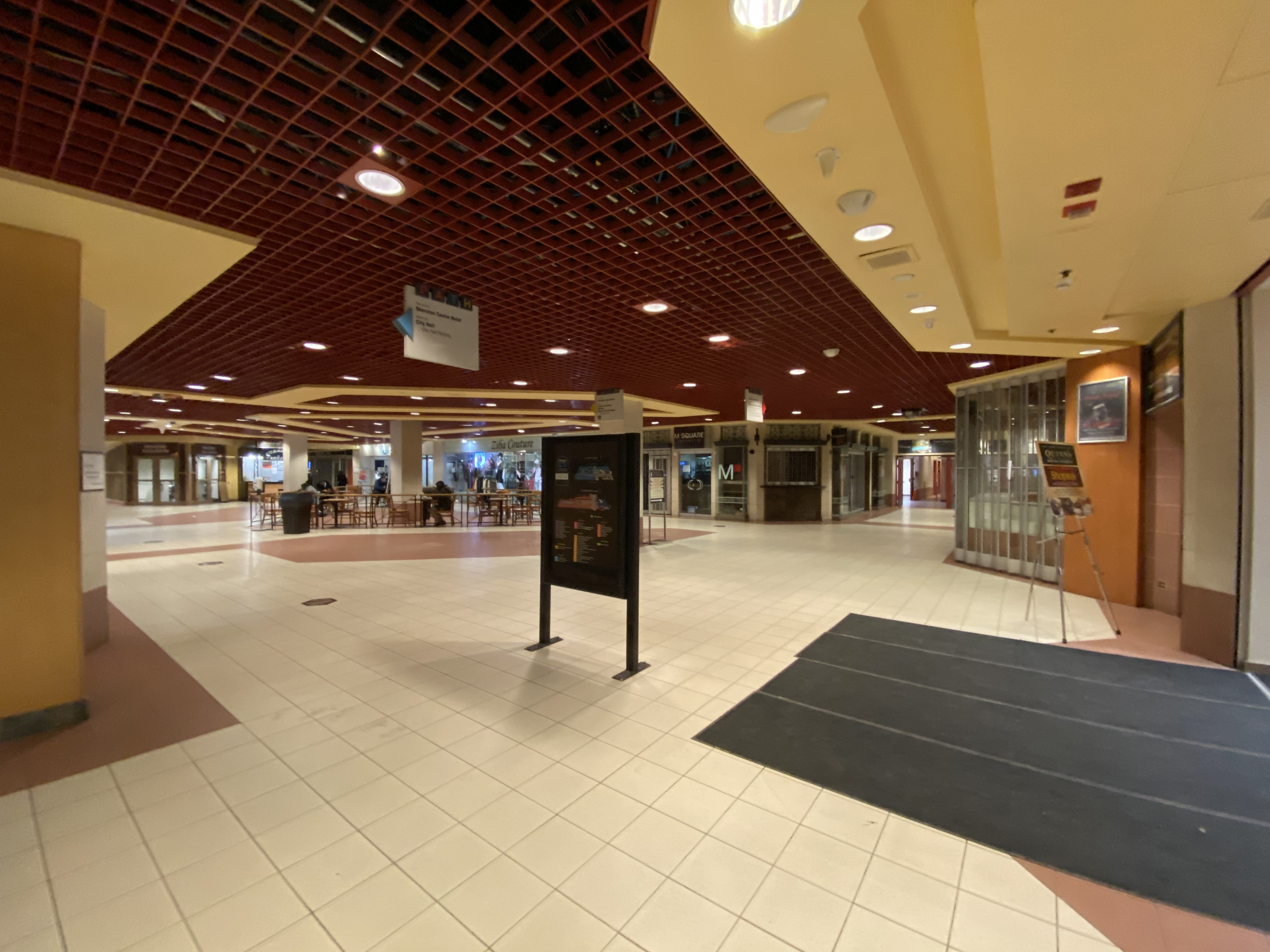
PATH network Arcade in basement

== See also ==
- List of tallest buildings in Toronto
- Four Seasons Centre
