= Telus Harbour =

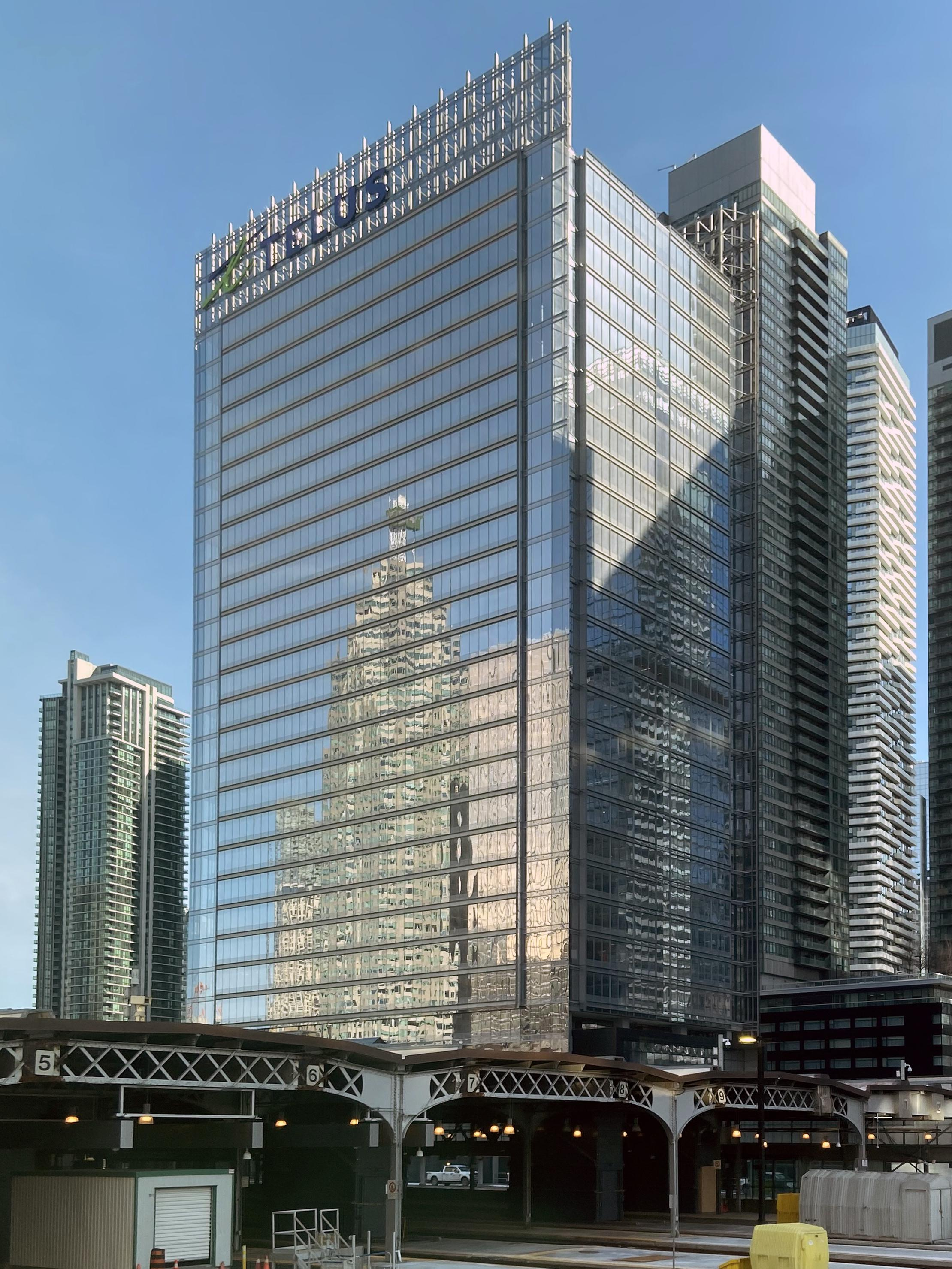
- Former names: Union Tower
- Alternative names: Telus House

General information
- Type: Commercial offices
- Location: 25 York Street; Toronto, Ontario
- Coordinates: 43.6433°N 79.3809°W
- Construction started: 2007
- Completed: 2009

Height
- Antenna spire: 136.1 m (447 ft)
- Roof: 121.7 m (399 ft)

Technical details
- Floor count: 32
- Floor area: 72,000 m^{2} (780,000 sq ft)
- Lifts/elevators: 15

Design and construction
- Architects: Adamson Associates Architects; Sweeny, Sterling, Finlayson & Co. Architects
- Developer: Menkes Developments Ltd. Hospitals of OntarioPension Plan (HOOPP) and Halcyon Partners Fund
- Main contractor: Menkes Construction

Telus Harbour, formerly Telus House and Union Tower, is a 30-storey office skyscraper at 25 York Street, on the south side of the traditionally defined financial district of Toronto, Ontario, Canada. As of 2016, Telus being the Anchor tenant, occupied 21 of 30 storeys (70%), which included 3 of them dedicated to fun and wellness. In 2021, the building earned BOMA BEST Platinum certification with a score of 99.2% which was, at the time, the highest score globally.

== Location ==
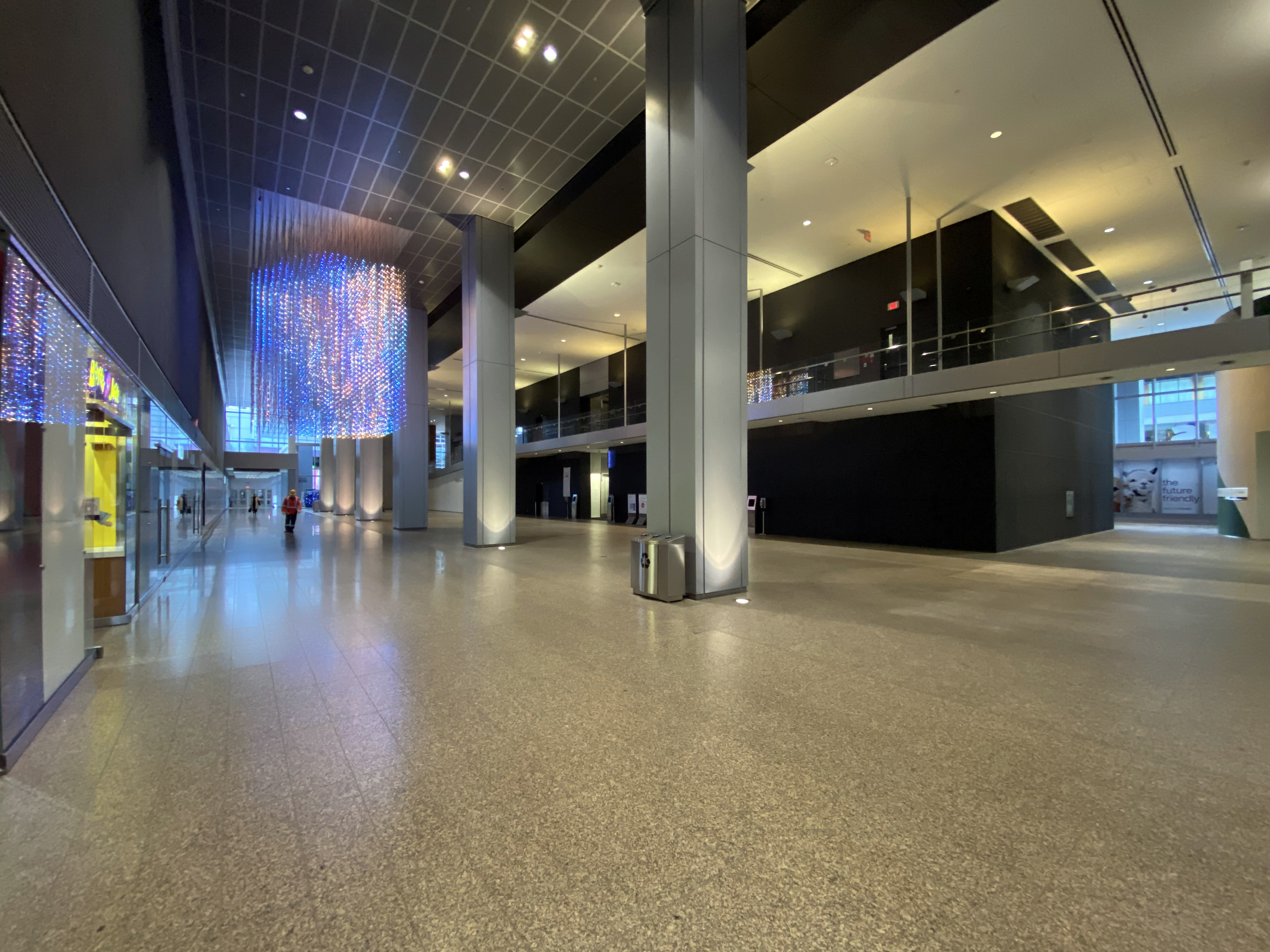
office lobby

The building is located at the corner of York Street and Bremner Boulevard, the former brownfield railway lands, just south of Union Station. Telus Tower is connected to the Toronto PATH network of underground pedestrian passageways. The building is visible from the Toronto Waterfront and is one of the many new developments in the area, including the Scotiabank Arena, Maple Leaf Square, and Infinity Condominium.

== Sustainable design ==
The development is pursuing Leadership in Energy and Environmental Design (LEED) gold status for the project's environmental sustainability.

== Construction ==
The project was managed by Menkes Development Ltd., Alcion Ventures and HOOPP Realty Inc. and was built by architecture firms Sweeny&Co Architects Inc. and Adamson Associates as lead architects.

== Tenants ==
- Telus
- Dye & Durham
- President's Choice Financial (President's Choice Bank
- Kinross Gold
- Hudbay Minerals

== See also ==
- Toronto Harbour
