= Financial District, Toronto =

Financial District
- Central business district
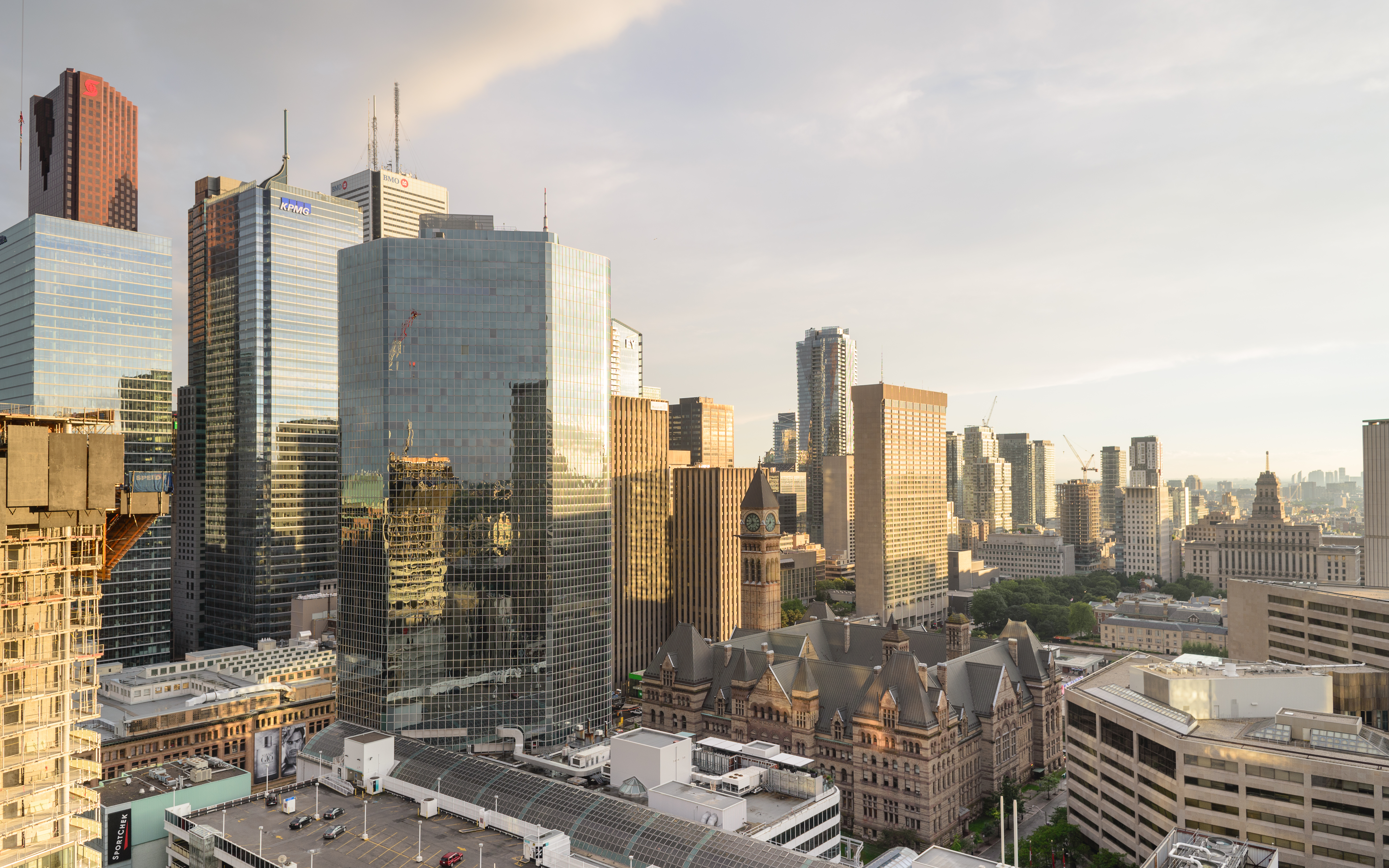
- View of the Financial District from the north east at the Pantages Tower

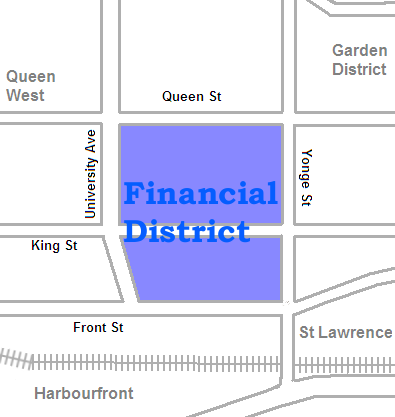

- Location within Toronto
- Coordinates: 43°38′55″N 79°22′49″W
- Country: Canada
- Province: Ontario
- City: Toronto

The Financial District is the central business district of downtown Toronto, Ontario, Canada. It was originally planned as New Town in 1796 as an extension of the Town of York (later the St. Lawrence Ward). It is the main financial district in Toronto and is considered the heart of Canada's finance industry. It is bounded roughly by Queen Street West to the north, Yonge Street to the east, Front Street to the south, and University Avenue to the west, though many office towers in the downtown core have been and are being constructed outside this area, which will extend the general boundaries. Examples of this trend are the Telus Harbour, RBC Centre, and CIBC Square.

Toronto's financial district anchors the city's highest-density commercial core. Major banks, corporate headquarters, law and accounting firms, and brokerages occupy large office towers, which also house surrounding advertising and marketing agencies.

The bank towers and much else in Toronto's core are connected by a system of underground walkways, known as PATH, which is lined with retail establishments making the area one of Toronto's most important shopping districts. The vast majority of these stores are only open during weekdays during the business day when the financial district is populated. During the evenings and weekends, the walkways remain open but the area is almost deserted and most of the stores are closed.

It is estimated 100,000 commuters enter and leave the financial district each working day. Transport links are centred on Union Station at the south end of the financial district, which is the hub of the GO Transit system that provides commuter rail and bus links to Toronto's suburbs.

== History ==
The district's origins date back to the mid to late-19th century when several early banks had head offices located in Toronto. Most of these banks were regional and came and went. It was not until the second half of the 20th century that the district became a centre for the Big Five Canadian banks.

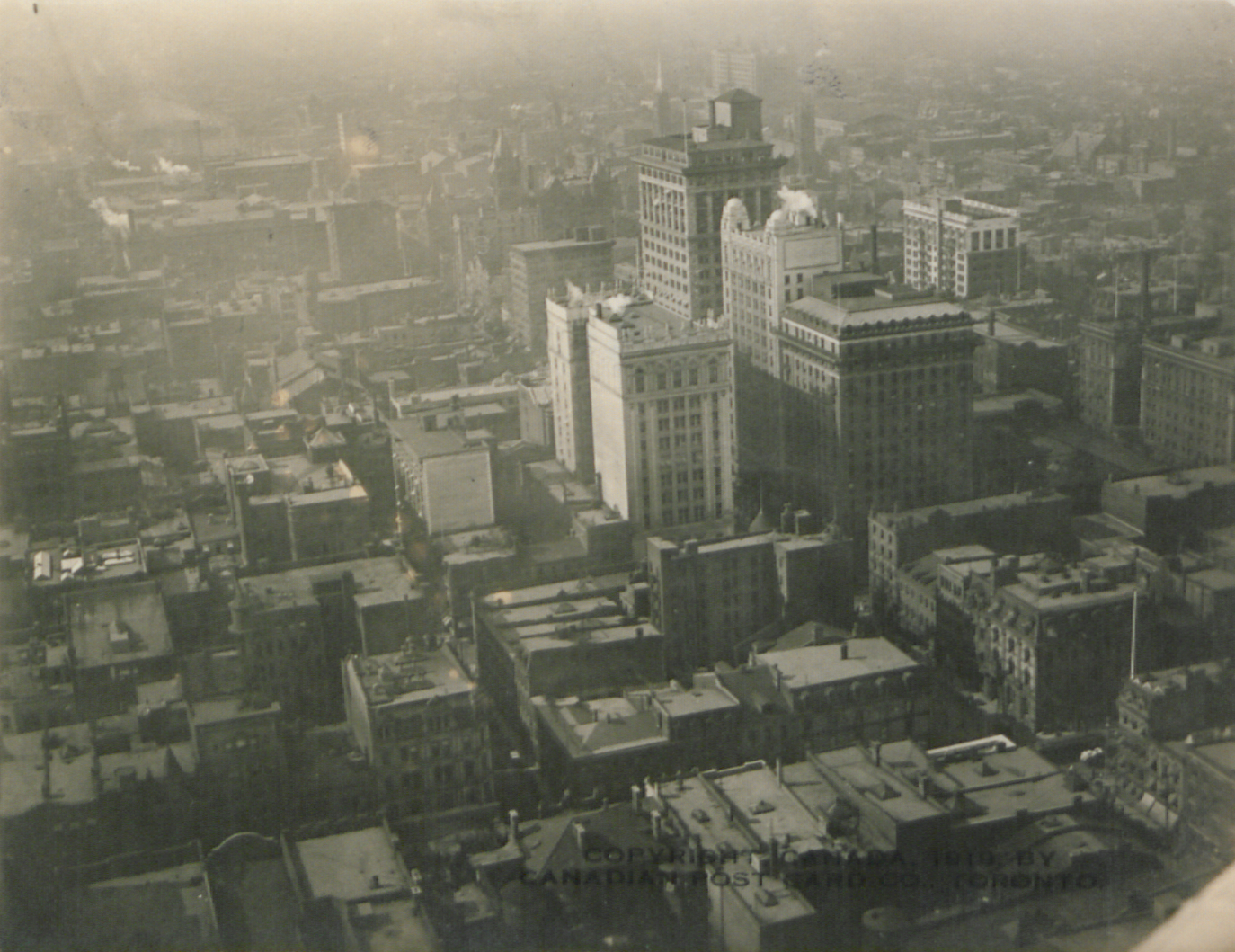
The Financial District from the air, 1920.

Of the Big Five banks, only CIBC and Toronto-Dominion Bank (including the banks existing before mergers) had full head offices in Toronto: Among the Big Five banks, two of them were established in Toronto, the Canadian Imperial Bank of Commerce (CIBC), and Toronto-Dominion Bank (TD). CIBC was established in 1961 with the merger of two Toronto-based banks, the Canadian Bank of Commerce and the Imperial Bank of Canada; whereas TD was established in 1955 with the merger of two other Toronto-based banks, the Bank of Toronto and The Dominion Bank.

The other three Big Five banks were established outside of Ontario during the 19th century, and moved their headquarters to Toronto in the 20th century. Two of the banks, the Royal Bank of Canada (RBC) and Scotiabank, were established in Halifax. Scotiabank relocated to Toronto in 1931, while RBC relocated its head office to Montreal in 1907, and later to Toronto in 1976. The Bank of Montreal (BMO) was also established in Montreal, although the bank relocated its head offices to Toronto in 1975. While First Canadian Place in Toronto serves as BMO's operational headquarters or "executive offices," its legal head office remains in Montreal. Similarly, Royal Bank Plaza maintains two headquarters in Montreal and Toronto, with RBC referring to Royal Bank Plaza in Toronto as its "corporate headquarters".

In addition to major financial institutions, several Toronto-based law firms, most notably the Seven Sisters, have also based their offices in the Financial District.

The Toronto Financial District Business Improvement Area was later retained order to represent all commercial businesses within the district. The organization engages in streetscape improvements, addressing key issues that impact the area, and promoting the area's businesses online.

With much business activity and demand, there are new residential and condominium/towers built inside and around the edges, many of them are connected to the PATH system. In the southeast of the financial district, a new tunnel is under construction from Union Station to connect to Backstage Condo on Yonge and The-Esplanade.

=== Lost historic buildings ===
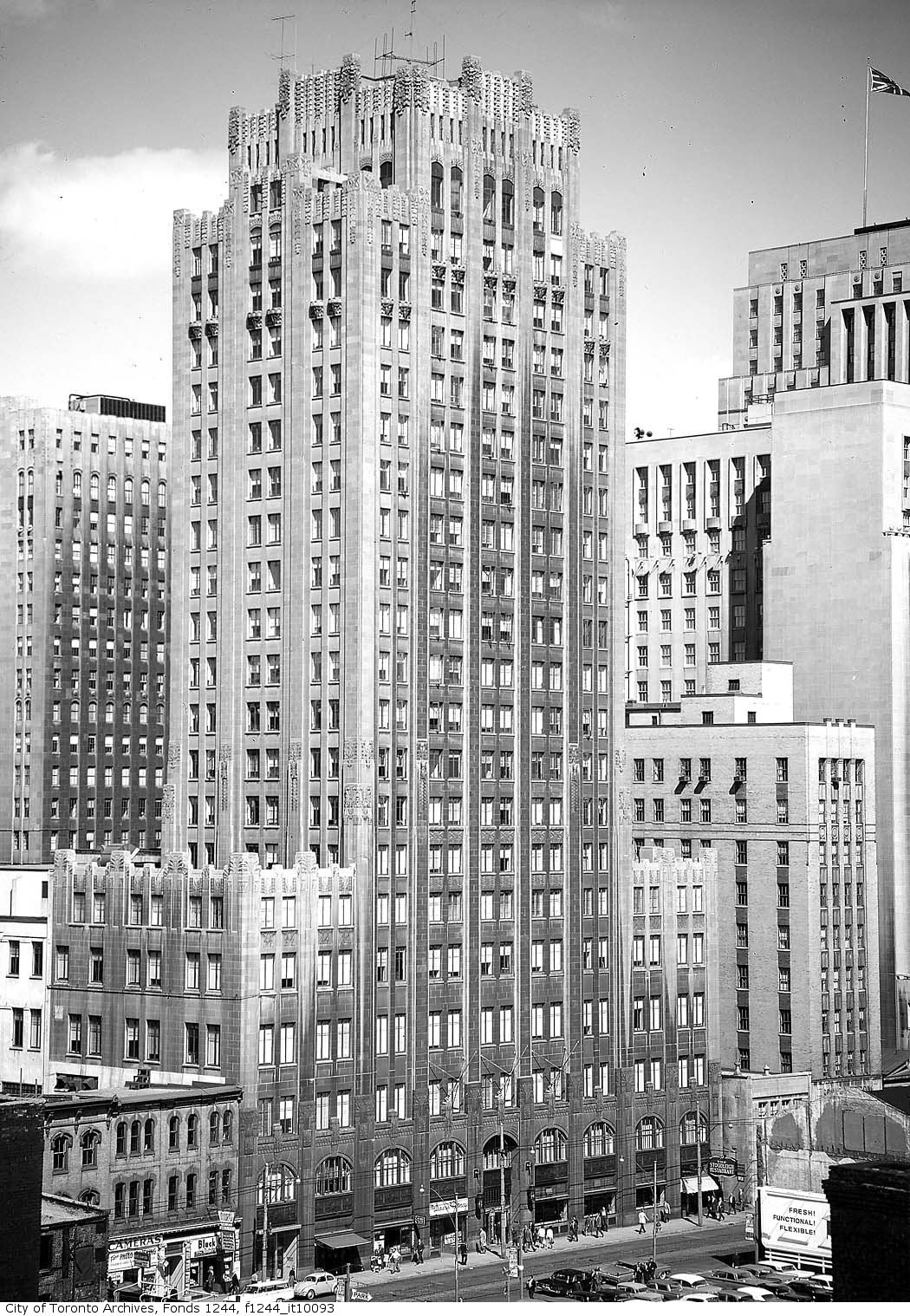
Completed in 1929, the Art Deco Toronto Star Building was one of several historic buildings torn down as the district developed in the mid-20th century.

Developments during the mid-20th century led to the demolition of several 19th and 20th Century buildings including:

- Old Toronto Star Building - First Canadian Place
- retained various facades of 19th-century buildings along Yonge Street - Brookfield Place
- Bank of Toronto head office - Toronto-Dominion Centre
- The Dominion Bank head office - Commerce Court West tower

Facade elements recovered from the demolition of the Toronto Star and Bank of Toronto Buildings are found at Guild Park and Gardens in Scarborough.

== Notable landmarks ==
=== Buildings 200m+ ===
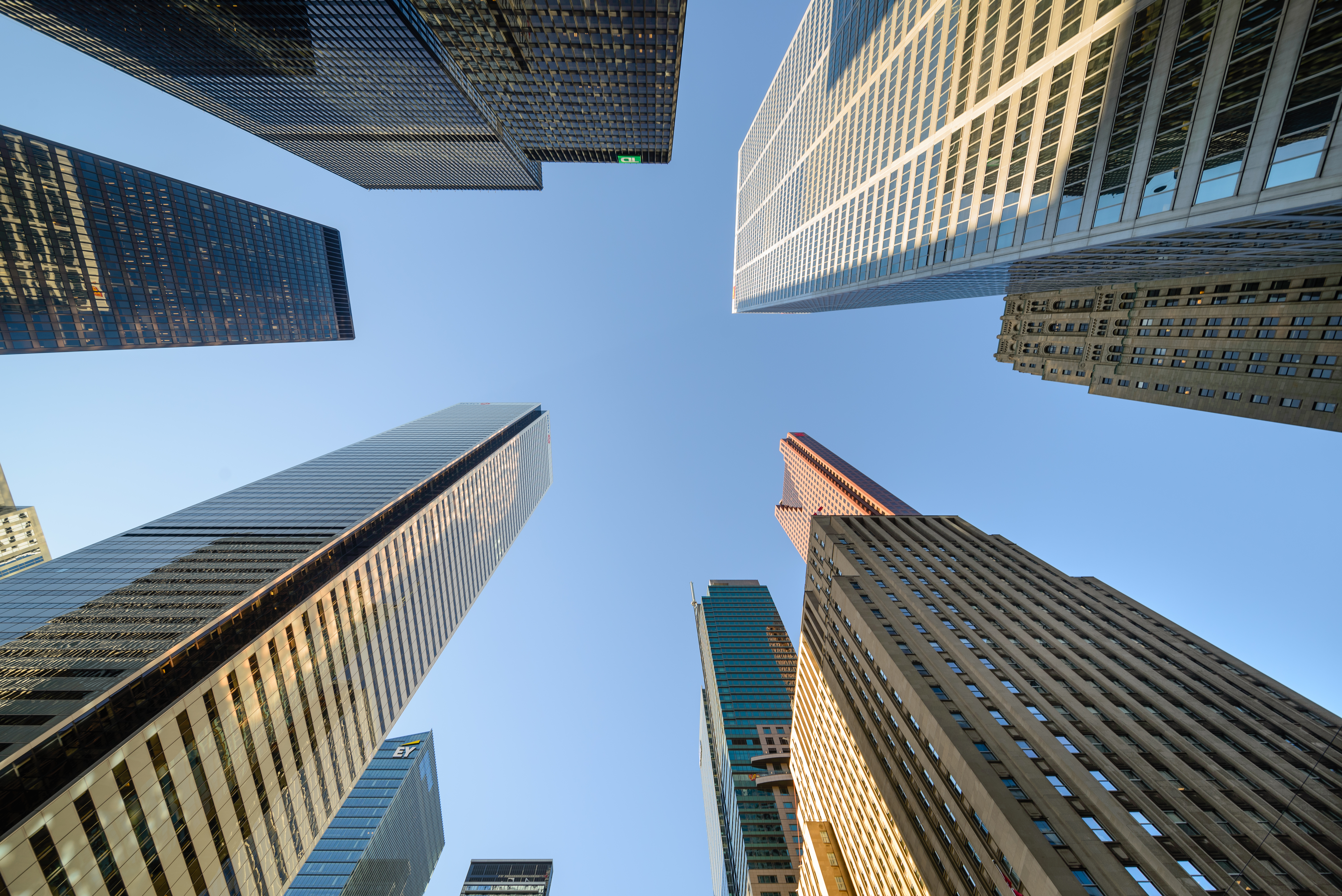
A worm's-eye view of the Financial District's tallest structure, including three of Canada's tallest buildings.

The following is a list of buildings in the Financial District over 200 metres (660 ft) in height.

Name	Image	Height m / ft	Floors	Year	Category	Notes
First Canadian Place		298 / 978	72	1976	Commercial	Tallest building in Canada since 1976; 8th tallest building in the world at the time of its completion; Tallest building in the world outside Chicago and New York City at the time of its completion; Tallest building completed in Toronto in the 1970s; Formerly known as First Bank Tower
St. Regis Toronto		277 / 908	57	2012	Hotel & Residential	Tallest mixed-use building in Canada; 776 ft (237 m) to roof; Tallest building completed in Toronto in the 2010s as of 2017; Formerly known as Trump International Hotel & Tower Toronto
Scotia Plaza		275 / 902	68	1988	Commercial	Tallest building completed in Toronto in the 1980s
TD Canada Trust Tower		261 / 856	53	1990	Commercial	The tower is a part of the Brookfield Place office complex; Tallest building completed in Toronto in the 1990s
Commerce Court West		239 / 784	57	1972	Commercial	The building is a part of the Commerce Court office complex
TD Bank Tower		223 / 731	56	1967	Commercial	The tower is a part of the Toronto-Dominion Centre office complex; Tallest building completed in Toronto in the 1960s
Bay Adelaide Centre West Tower		218 / 715	51	2009	Commercial	The tower is a part of the Bay Adelaide Centre office complex; Tallest building completed in Toronto in the 2000s
Bay Wellington Tower		208 / 682	49	1991	Commercial	The tower is a part of the Brookfield Place office complex

Other major skyscrapers and complexes in the financial district include:

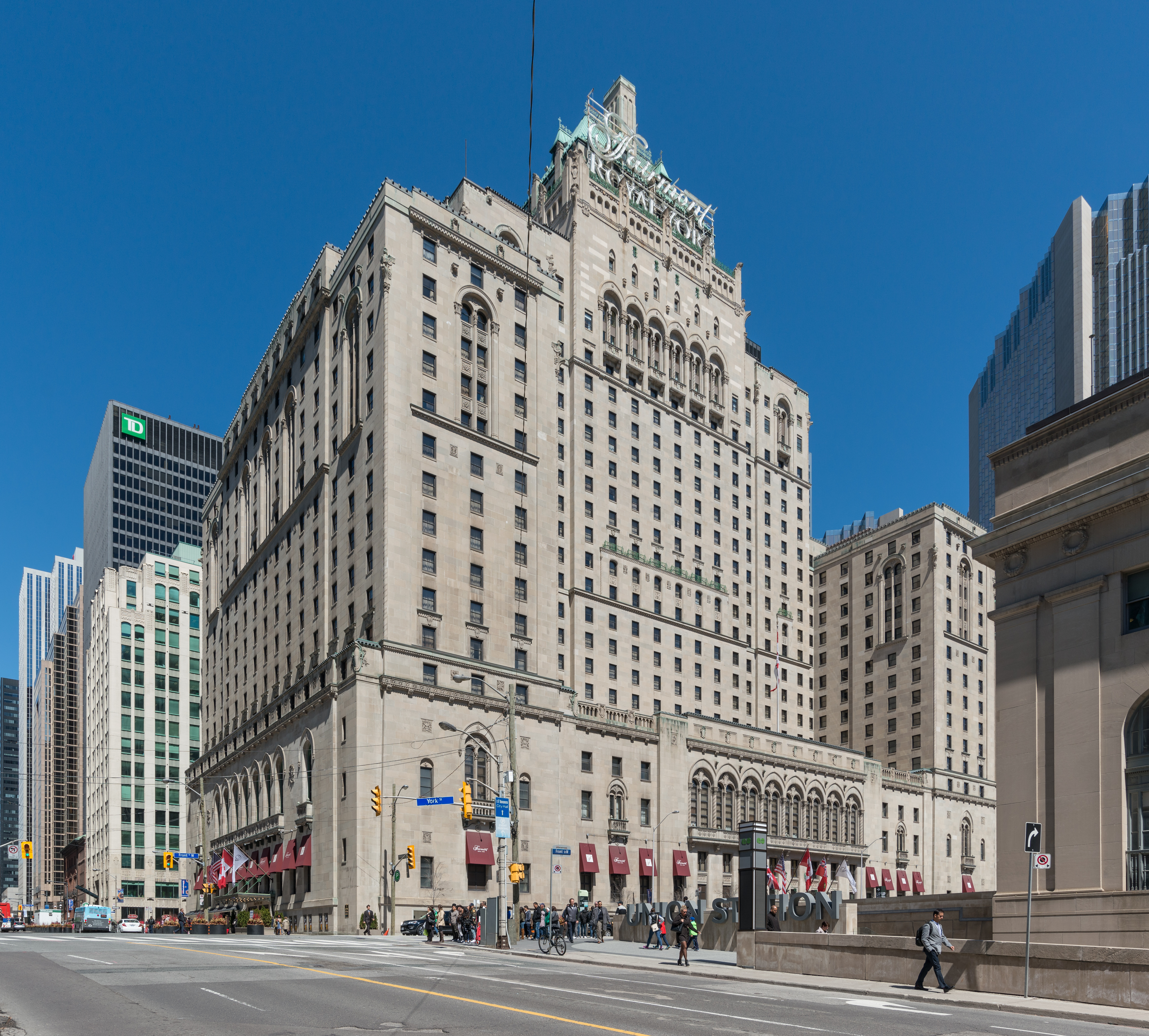
Opened in 1929, the Fairmont Royal York is a hotel that sits on Front Street, the District's southern boundary.

- Exchange Tower
- Fairmont Royal York
- One King West
- RBC Centre
- Ritz-Carlton Toronto
- Sun Life Centre
- Telus Harbour

=== Diplomatic and economic missions ===
- Consulate of Mexico
- Consulate-General of Republic of Korea — Commercial Section (KOTRA)
- Consulate-General of Japan
- Consulate of Malaysia
- Consulate-General of Dominican Republic
- Taipei Economic and Cultural Representative Office
