= Path (Toronto) =

Walkway network and mall in Ontario, Canada

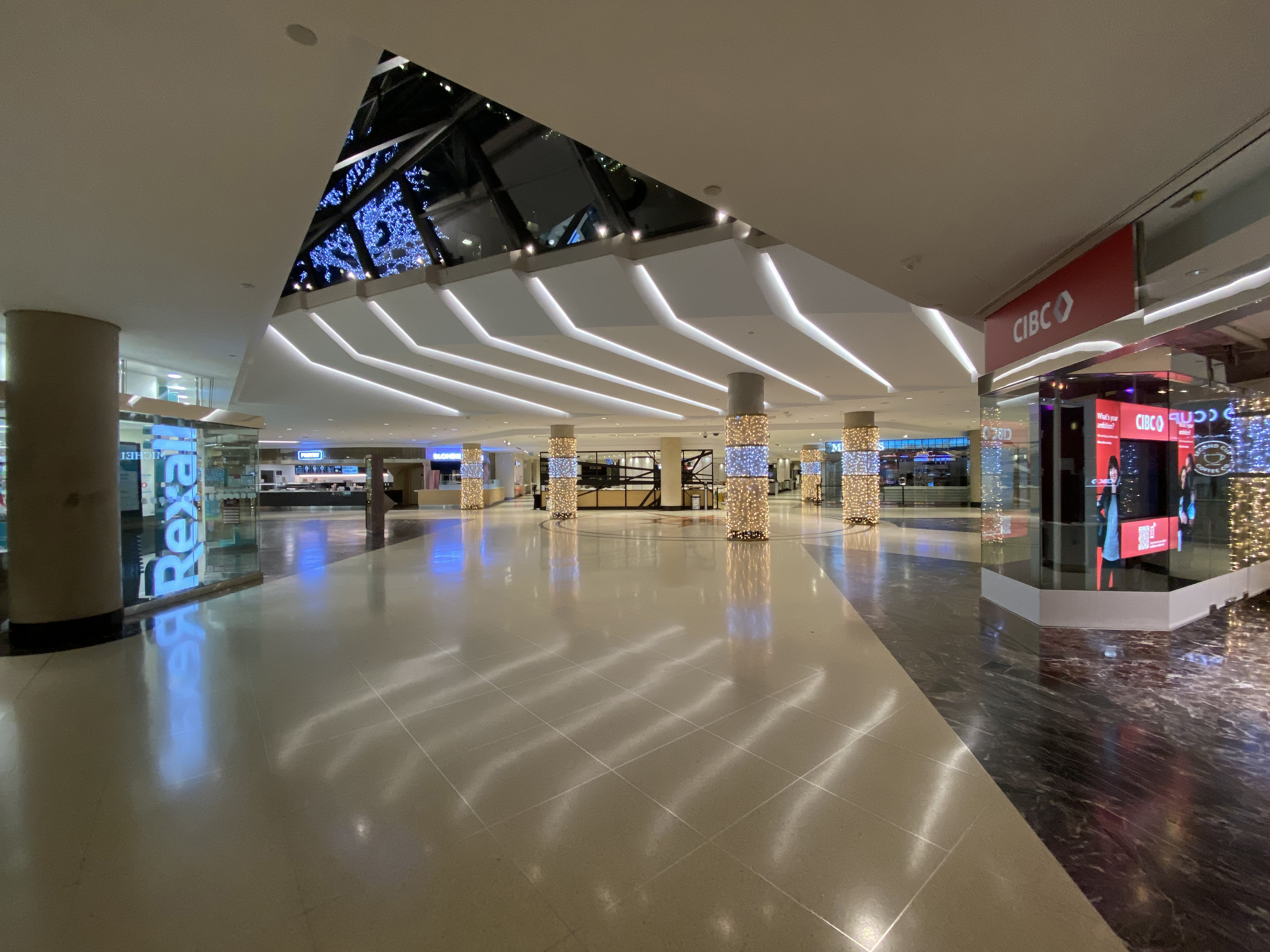
- Path network viewed from under Commerce Court
- Location: Toronto, Ontario, Canada
- Opened: 1900 – first pedestrian tunnel in Toronto; 1960–1970s – construction begins of underground shopping concourses and linkages 1987 – City becomes coordinating agency of network
- Manager: City of Toronto government (coordinating agency)
- Num. of stores: 1,200
- Floor area: 371,600 m^{2} (4,000,000 sq ft)
- Floors: 1
- Parking: 20 parking garages
- Website: www.toronto.ca/path/

The Path (stylized in all caps) is a network of underground pedestrian tunnels, elevated walkways, and at-grade walkways connecting the office towers of Downtown Toronto, Ontario, Canada. It connects more than 70 buildings via 30 kilometres (19 mi) of tunnels, walkways, and shopping areas. According to Guinness World Records, Path as of 2016 was the largest underground shopping complex in the world, with 371,600 square metres (4,000,000 sq ft) of retail space which includes over 1,200 retail fronts. In 2023, it was surpassed in length by Reso in Montreal. As of 2016, over 200,000 residents and workers use the Path system daily with the number of private dwellings within walking distance at 30,115.

The Path network's northern point is the Atrium on Bay at Dundas Street and Bay Street, including a now-closed tunnel to the former Toronto Coach Terminal, while its southern point is Waterpark Place on Queens Quay. Its main north–south axes of walkways generally parallel Yonge and Bay Streets, while its main east–west axis parallels King Street.

There is continuous expansion of the Path system around Union Station. The two towers of CIBC Square are linked to the Path system, extending it to the east to cross over Yonge Street by a pedestrian bridge into the Backstage Condominium building (Esplanade and Yonge corner), giving closed access to Union Station, Scotiabank Arena, and other buildings in Toronto's Financial District.

The Path is open 24 hours a day, 7 days a week, although some access points may have limited hours or be closed on weekends.

== History ==
=== Early pedestrian tunnels ===
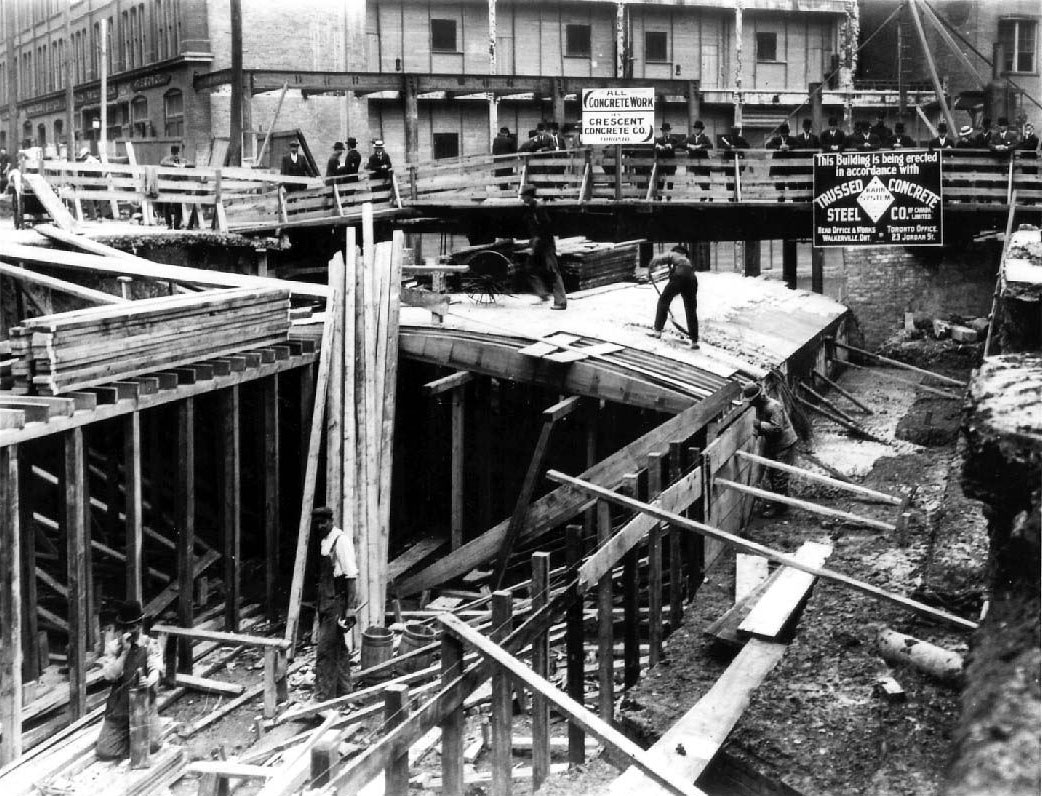
Toronto's first public pedestrian tunnel under construction c. 1900. The tunnels connected the buildings of the Eaton's Annex.

In 1900, the Eaton's department store constructed a tunnel underneath James Street, allowing shoppers to walk between the Eaton's main store at Yonge and Queen streets and the Eaton's Annex located behind the (then) City Hall. It was the first underground pedestrian pathway in Toronto and is often credited as a historic precursor to the current Path network. The original Eaton's tunnel is still in use as part of the Path system, although today it connects Toronto Eaton Centre to the Bell Trinity Square office complex on the site of the former Annex building.

Another original underground linkage, built in 1927 to connect Union Station and the Royal York Hotel, remained an integral part of the Path network for many years until it was replaced by a newer connection between the Royal York Hotel and Royal Bank Plaza, which continues onward to Union Station.

=== Expansion ===
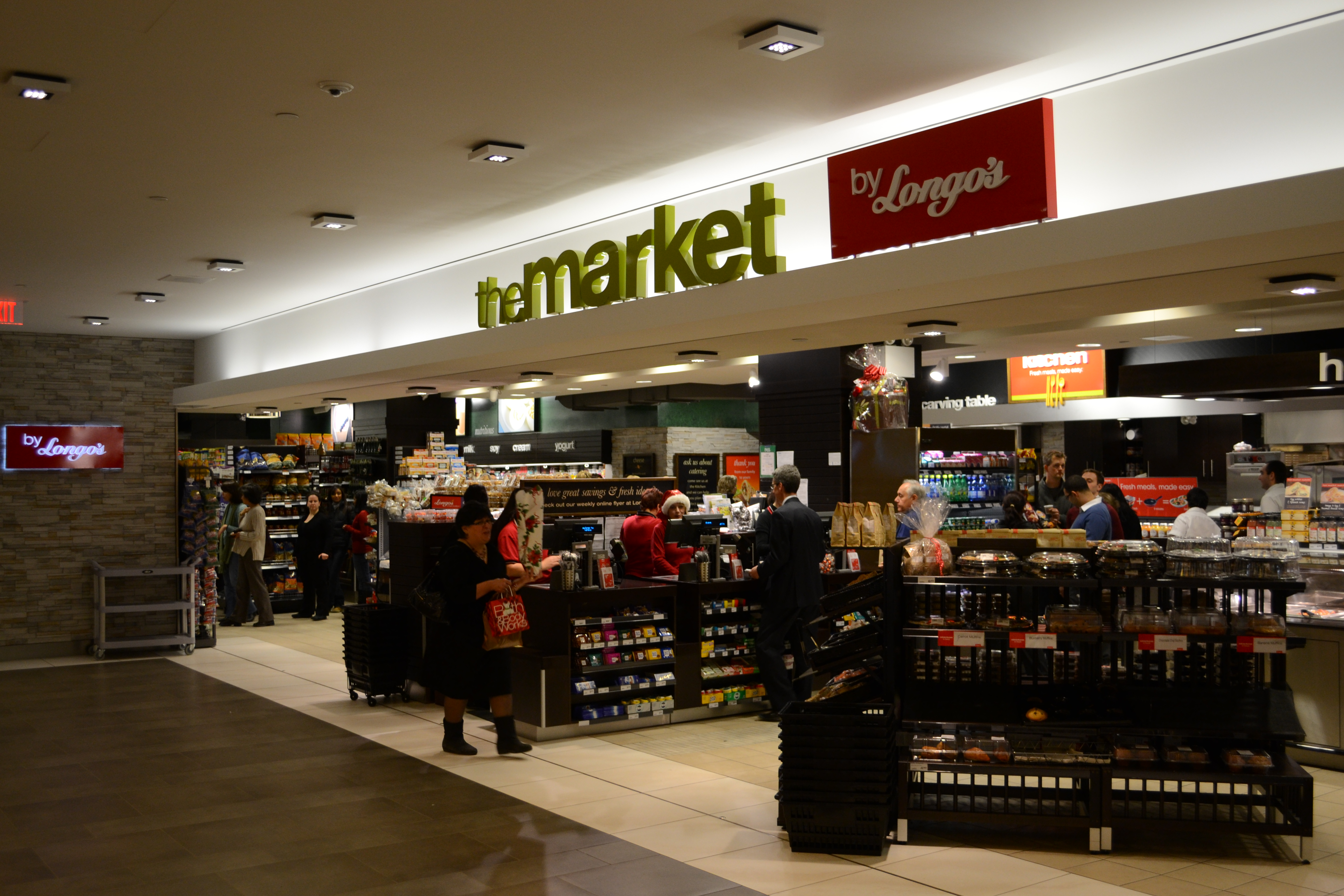
Longo's market situated in Path. Use of the tunnel network as retail space began in the mid-20th century.

The network of underground walkways expanded under city planner Matthew Lawson in the 1960s. Toronto's downtown sidewalks were overcrowded, and new office towers were removing much-needed small businesses from the streets. Lawson thus convinced several important developers to construct underground malls, pledging that they would eventually be linked. The designers of the Toronto-Dominion Centre, the first of Toronto's major urban developments in the 1960s (completed in 1967), were the first to include underground shopping in their complex, with the possibility of future expansion built in. The city originally helped to fund the construction, but with the election of a reform city council this practice ended. The reformers disliked the underground system, agreeing with Jane Jacobs's notion that an active street life was important in keeping cities and neighbourhoods vital and that consumers should be encouraged to shop on street level stores rather than in malls (whether they be above ground or below). However, the system continued to grow because developers bowed to their tenants' wishes and connected their buildings to the system. This also converted low-valued basements into some of the most valuable retail space in the country.

The next expansion of the network occurred in the early 1970s with the construction and underground connection of the Richmond-Adelaide Centre office tower with the Sheraton Centre hotel complex.

=== 21st century ===
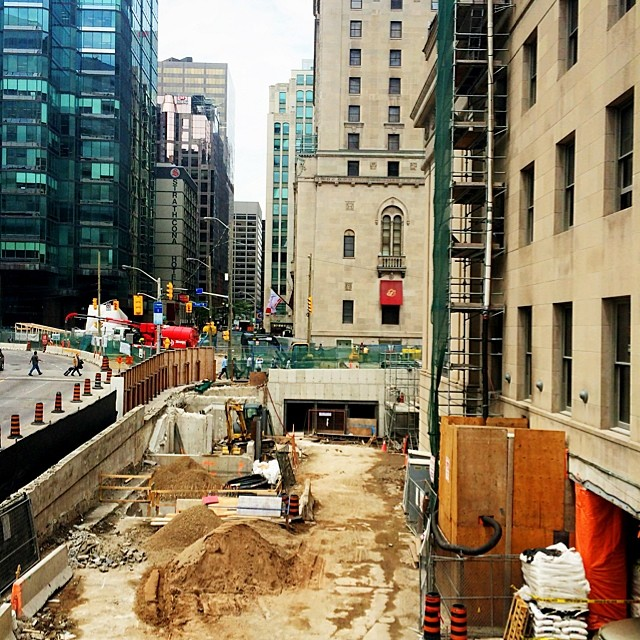
Work on new Path tunnels at Union Station, 2014

Construction of the Path tunnel north from Scotia Plaza through the Bay Adelaide Centre started in the fourth quarter of 2007. Completion of this section closed the last remaining gap in the north–south route through Path that parallels Yonge Street, thus eliminating the need to double back from Bay Street to get between buildings located on the eastern edge of Path.

In 2011, the City of Toronto released a long-term expansion plan for the Path network, developed by Urban Strategies Inc. As part of the expansion plan, there will be 45 new entry points and the walkway will be as long as 60 kilometres (37 mi) when changes are completed.

In August 2014, a major southward expansion of the Path network brought it closer to the Toronto waterfront, with the opening of a covered pedestrian bridge connecting Scotiabank Arena south to RBC WaterPark Place on Queens Quay (crossing the Lake Shore Boulevard / Gardiner Expressway corridor and Harbour Street).

The City of Toronto constructed a 300-metre (980 ft), $65-million tunnel connecting Union Station to Wellington Street Toronto planners have begun work to guide future Path development and ensure Path construction is included in basement levels of key new buildings.

The network was hit particularly hard during the COVID-19 pandemic in Toronto, with Bloomberg News calling the area a "ghost town". The pedestrian system's narrow halls in some locations were noted as a particular challenge, even after employees returned to downtown offices. The Toronto Financial District Business Improvement Area has planned various movement modifications to the space.

In early November 2020, a connection was opened between the Maple Leaf Square complex (via the basement-level Longo's supermarket) and ÏCE Condominiums at York Centre. On December 5, 2020, the new Union Station Bus Terminal was opened within the new CIBC Square complex and connected via a skywalk to the Scotiabank Arena. In 2024, the newly built TD Terrace at 160 Front St West included a Path connection to Simcoe Place (200 Front Street West).

== Design and wayfinding ==
Path provides an important contribution to the economic viability of the city's downtown core and is also used to supplement sidewalk capacity in downtown Toronto. The system facilitates pedestrian linkages to public transit, accommodating more than 200,000 daily commuters and thousands of additional tourists and residents en route to sports and cultural events. Its underground nature provides pedestrians with a safe haven from the winter cold and snow, as well as relief from the summer heat and humidity.

=== Signage and navigation tools ===
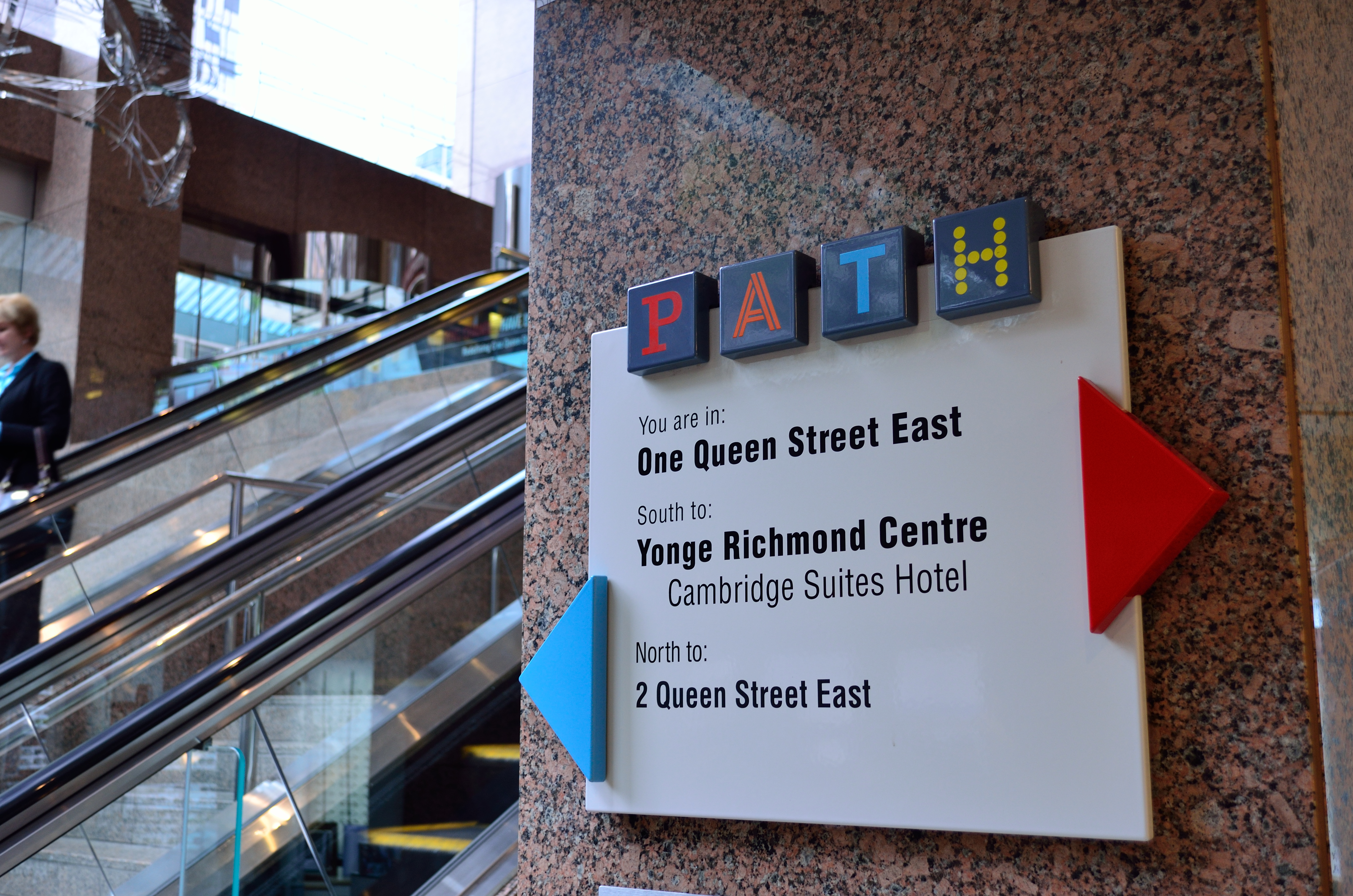
Previous-generation directional signage for Path. Signs used a colour-coded system, with different colours representing different cardinal directions.

In 1987, City Council adopted a unified wayfinding system throughout the network. The design firms Gottschalk+Ash International and Muller Design Associates were hired to design and implement the overall system in consultation with a diverse group of land owners, City staff and stakeholders. A colour-coded system with directional cues was deployed in the early 1990s. Within the various buildings, pedestrians can find a Path system map, plus cardinal directions (red for south, orange for west, blue for north, yellow for east) on ceiling signs at selected junctions. These same colours are also used in the Path logo.

The signage can be hard to find inside some of the various connected buildings. Building owners concerned about losing customers to neighbouring buildings insisted any signage not dominate their buildings or their own signage system. The city relented and the result is the current system. Many complain the system is hard to navigate.

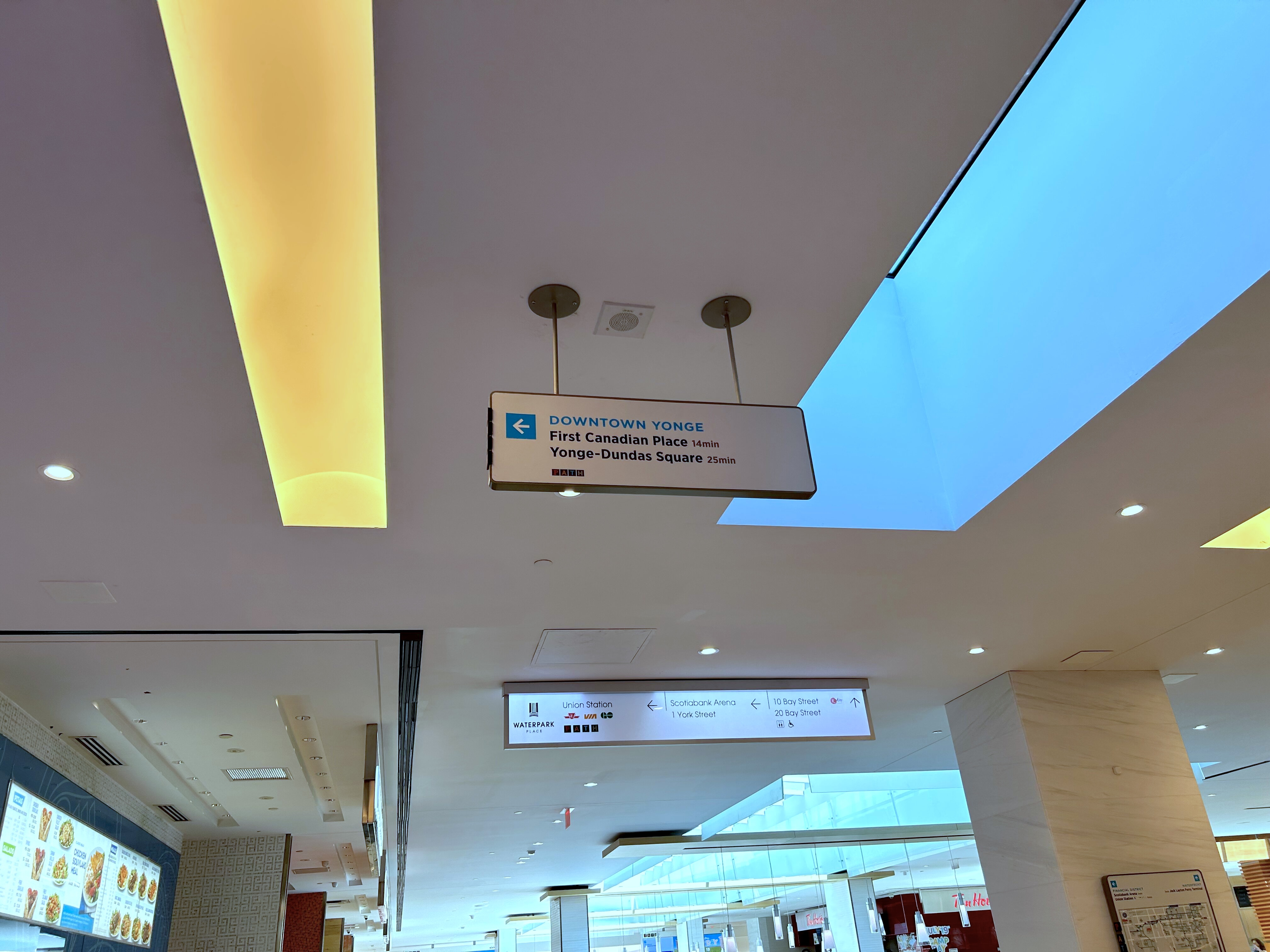
A Path sign circa 2018. Current-generation Path signs list neighbourhoods and landmark destinations to speed navigation.

In 2016, the Toronto Financial District Business Improvement Area (FDBIA) and City of Toronto began study of updating Path signage and maps to make navigation easier. In 2018, Steer Davies Gleave completed design of a new wayfinding system that is still used today. This system was rolled out in some buildings in 2018. In 2024, the FDBIA completed a comprehensive update of all existing Path installations that brought this system to all buildings with Path installations.

The new system no longer uses the colour-coded compass system and refers to neighbourhoods and landmarks instead. The system also integrates with TO360, Toronto’s neighbourhood mapping and wayfinding system.

Over the years, a number of online tools have been developed to aid navigating the pedestrian network. These typically consist of interactive maps, routes, and helpful photographs.

== Connected facilities ==
More than 50 buildings or office towers are connected through the Path system. It comprises twenty parking garages, five subway stations, two major department stores, two major shopping centres, six major hotels, and a railway terminal. The CN Tower, Ripley's Aquarium of Canada, and Rogers Centre are connected via an enclosed elevated walkway, called the SkyWalk, from Union Station, although the walkway does not have indoor connections to these attractions.

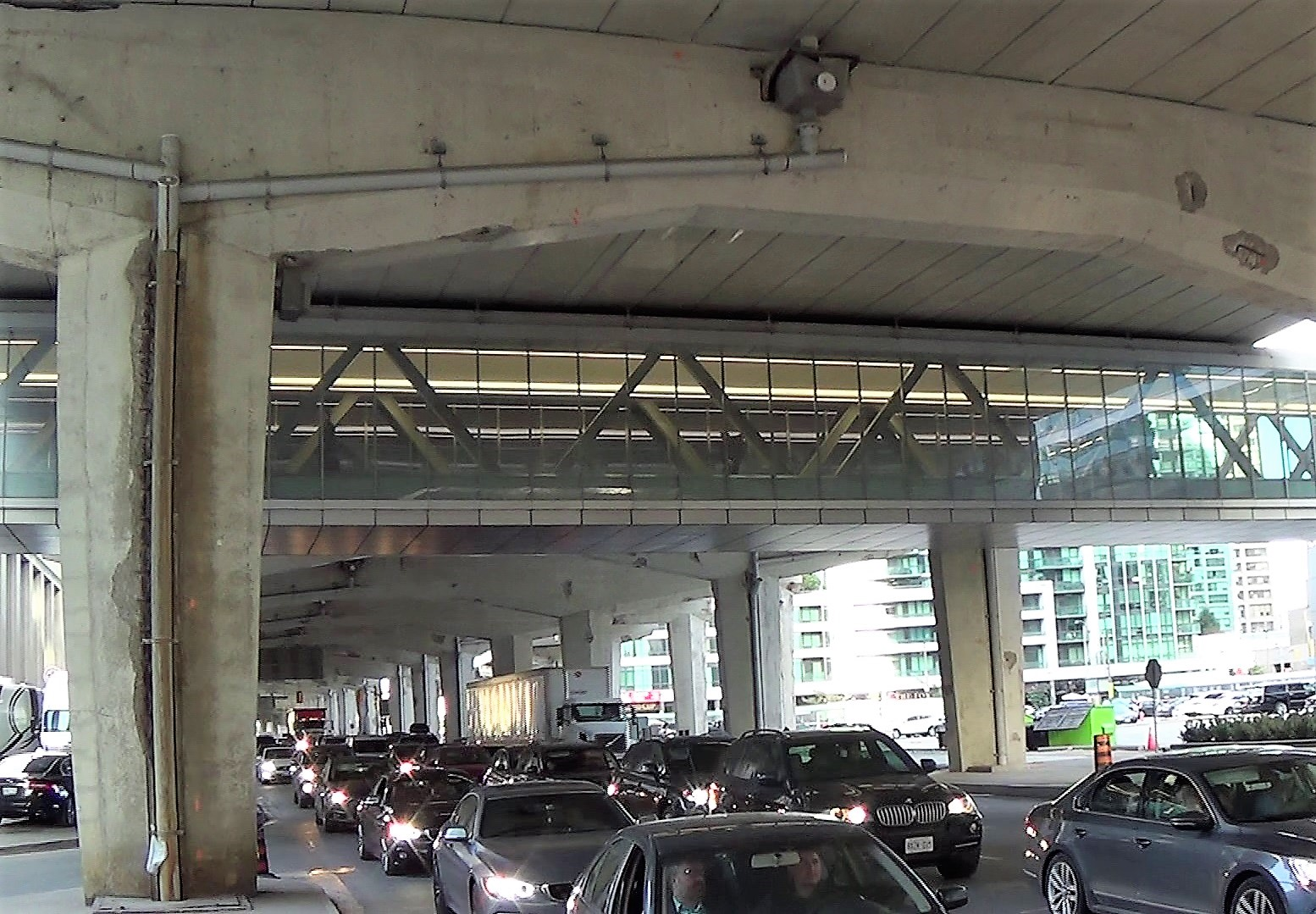
Path walkway under the Gardiner Expressway and over Lake Shore Boulevard

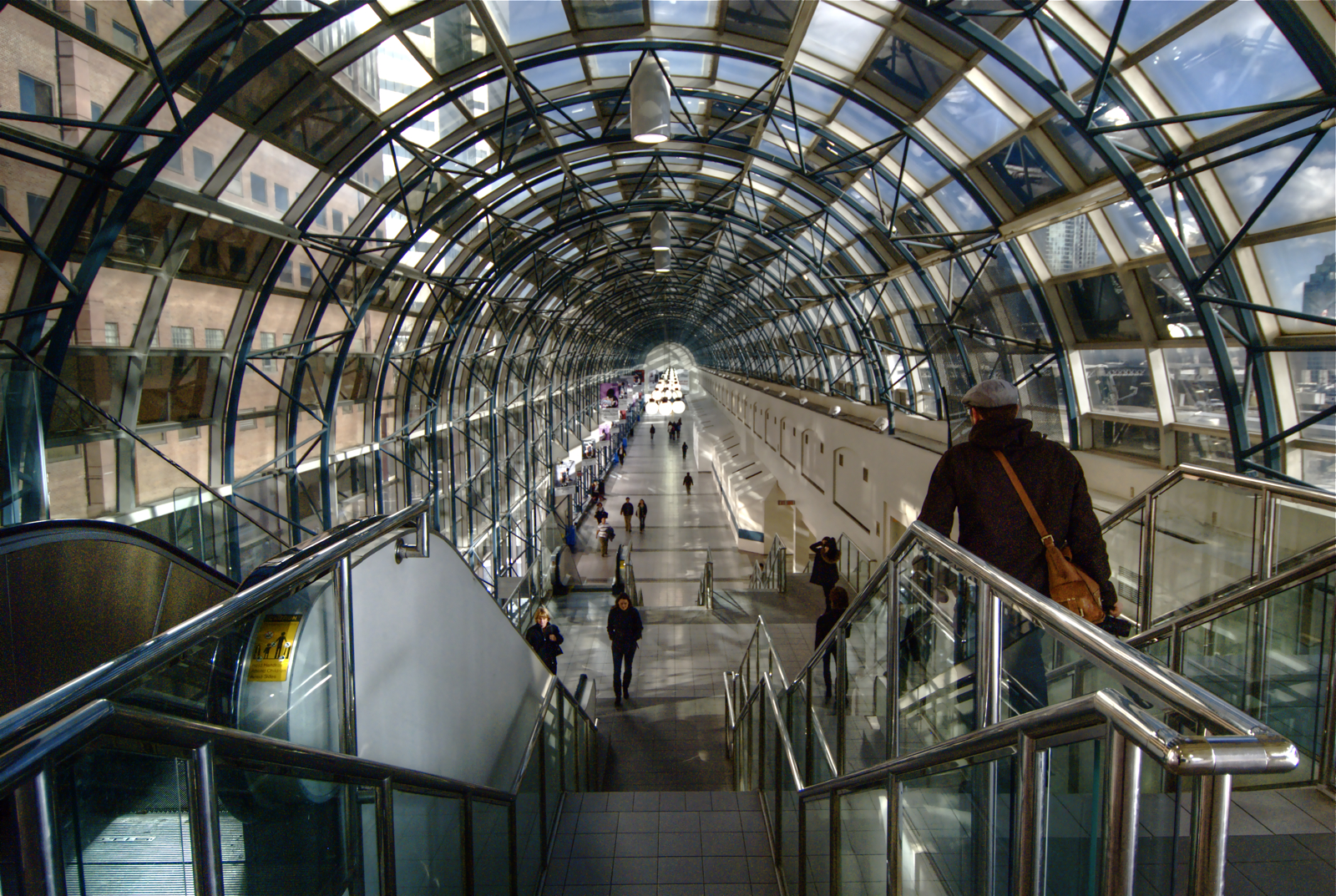
An elevated portion of Path, the SkyWalk, connects Union Station to several attractions south of the station.

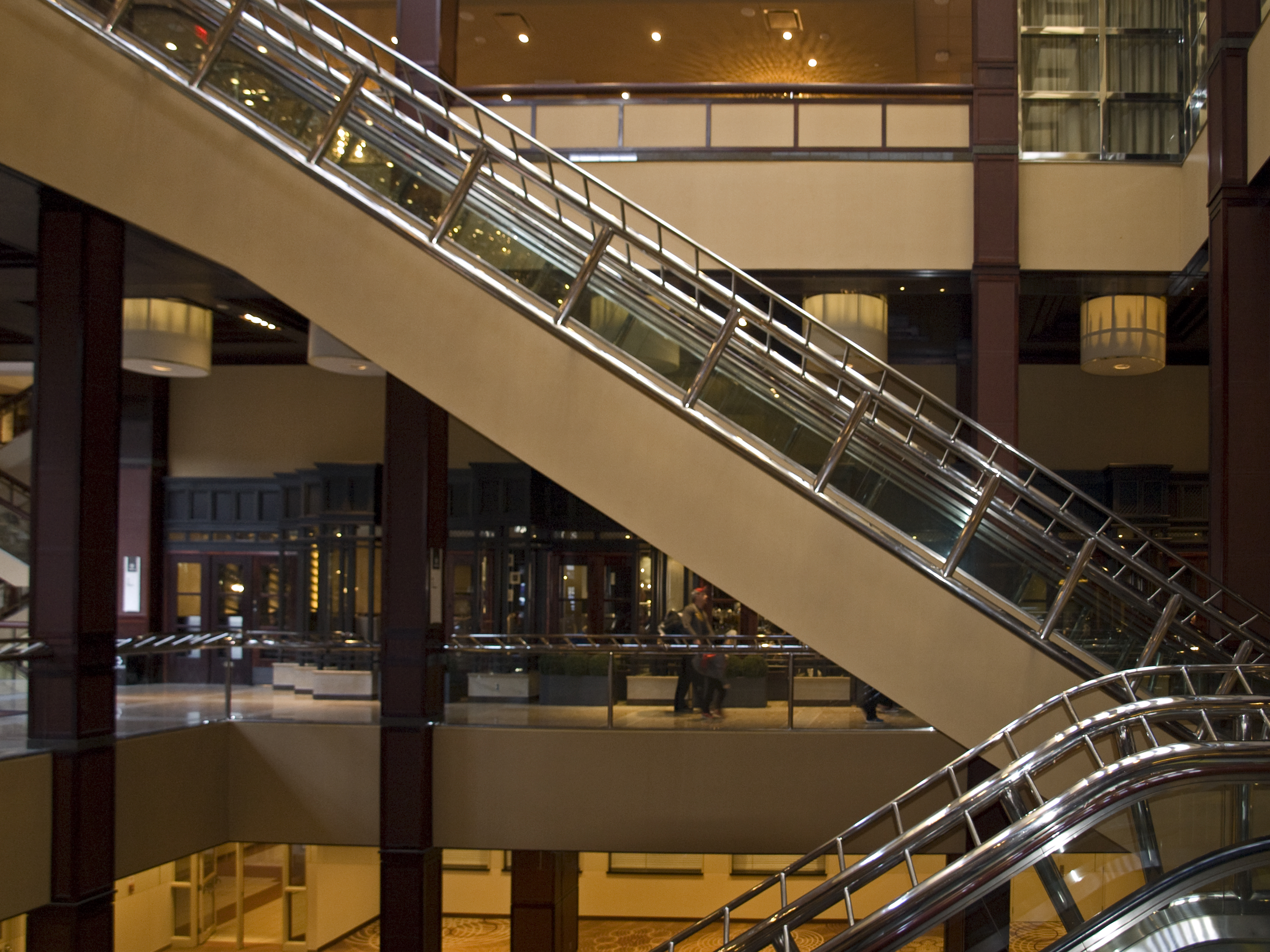
Lobby of the Sheraton Centre Hotel Toronto before renovation; the entrance to Path is at bottom left.

- 1 King Street West
- 1 Queen Street East
- 1 York
- 10 Dundas East
- 16 York
- 145 King Street West
- 200 King Street West
- 150 York
- 2 Queen Street East
- 19 Grand Trunk
- 22 Front Street West
- 25 Lower Simcoe
- 55 University
- Atrium on Bay
- Bay Adelaide Centre
- Bell Trinity Square
- Brookfield Place
- Canadian Broadcasting Centre
- CIBC Square
- Citibank Place
- Commerce Court
- DBRS Tower
- Delta Toronto Hotel
- Design Exchange
- Dundee Place
- Exchange Tower
- EY Tower
- Fairmont Royal York
- Federal Building
- First Canadian Place
- Four Seasons Centre
- Harbour Plaza Residences
- Hilton Hotel
- Hockey Hall of Fame
- The former Hudson's Bay Queen Street building
- ÏCE Condominiums at York Centre
- InterContinental Toronto Centre
- Maple Leaf Square
- MetLife Place
- Metro Hall
- Metro Toronto Convention Centre
- Munich Re Centre
- RBC Centre
- RBC WaterPark Place
- Richmond-Adelaide Centre
- Ritz-Carlton Toronto
- Roy Thomson Hall
- Royal Bank Plaza
- Sankofa Square
- Scotia Plaza
- Scotiabank Arena
- Sheraton Centre Toronto Hotel
- Simcoe Place
- Southcore Financial Centre
- Sun Life Centre
- TD Terrace
- Telus Harbour
- Thomson Building
- Toronto City Hall
- Toronto Coach Terminal
- Toronto-Dominion Centre
- Toronto Eaton Centre
- Toronto subway stations:
  - TMU station
  - Queen station
  - King station
  - Union station
  - St. Andrew station
- Union Station
- Union Station Bus Terminal
- Victory Building
- Waterpark Place
- Yonge–Richmond Centre

== See also ==
- Edmonton Pedway, a similar skywalk system in Edmonton
- Plus 15, a similar skywalk system in Calgary
- RÉSO, the similar underground city system in Montreal
- Chicago Pedway, a similar skywalk system in Chicago
