= Royal Bank Building (Toronto) =

Office buildings in Ontario, Canada

Coordinates: 43.6491°N 79.3779°W

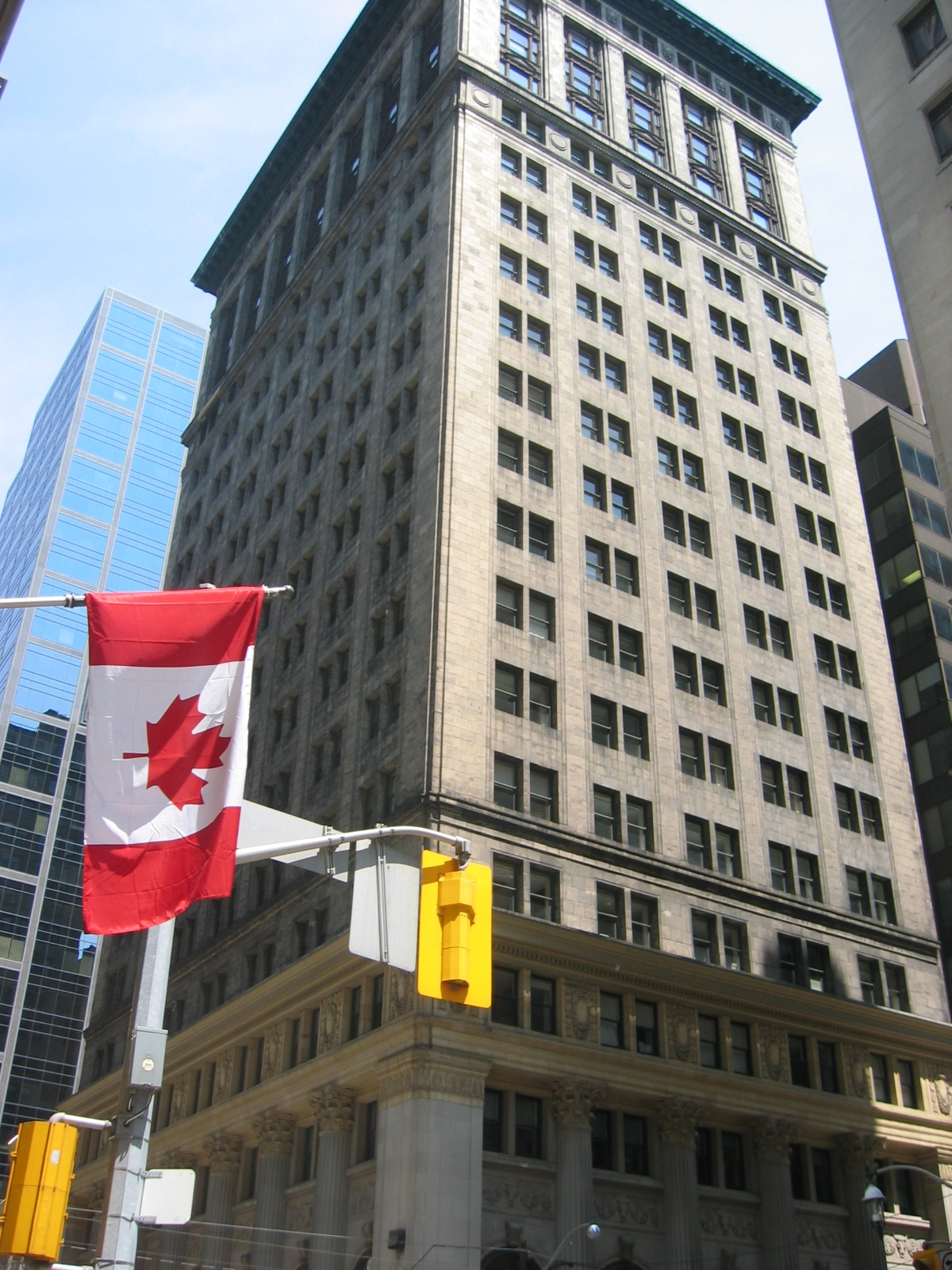
The 1915 building

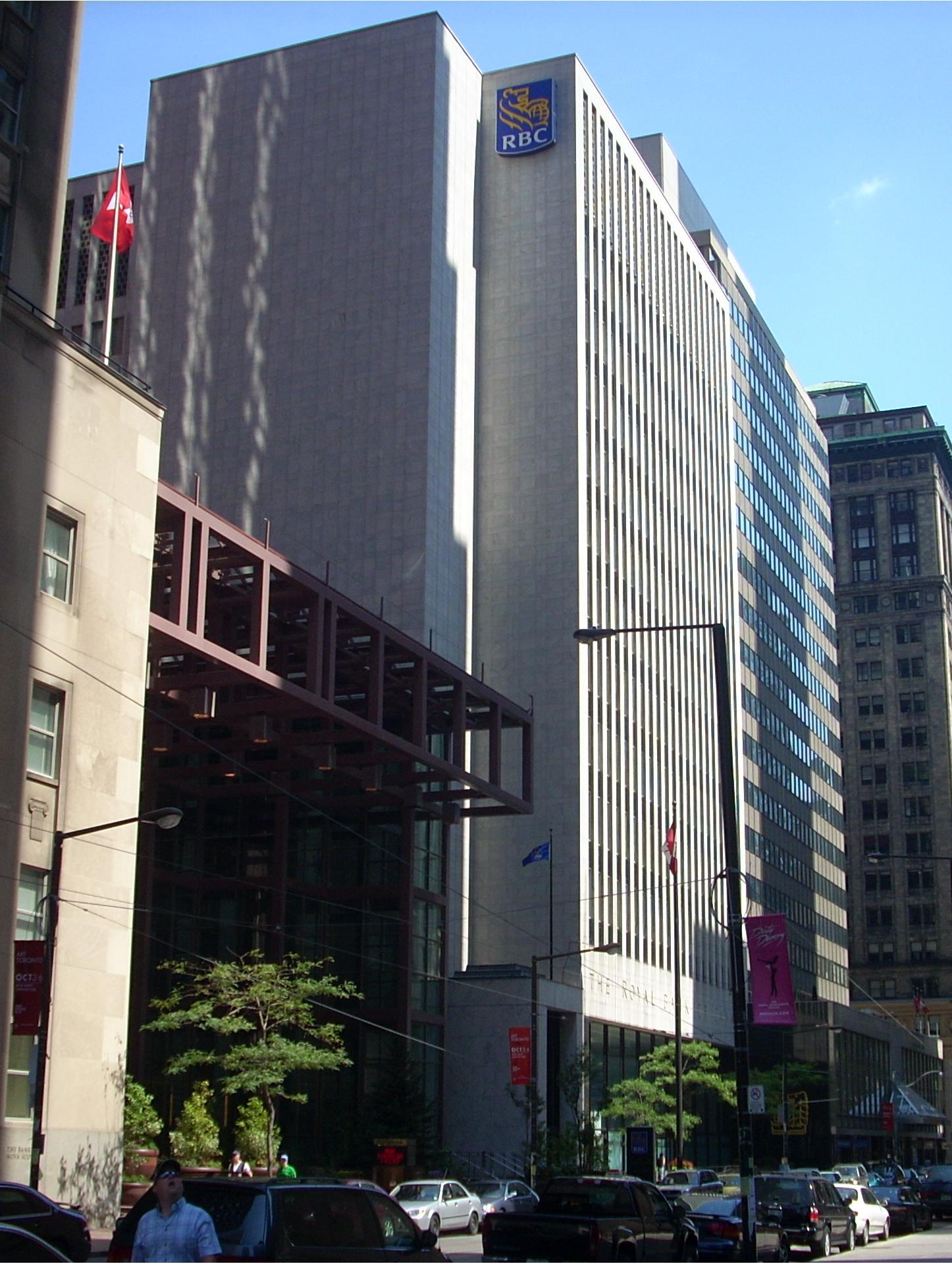
The 1964 building

The Royal Bank Building refers to two office buildings constructed for the Royal Bank of Canada in the Financial District of Toronto, Ontario, Canada:The first building is a 20-storey structure situated on the northeast corner of Yonge and King Streets. It was completed in 1915 (111 years ago) and designed by the architectural firm Ross and Macdonald. The building was among Toronto's first modern skyscraper after the fire of 1904. It was built to function as a commercial office space and bank operations, reflecting the prominence of high-rise office buildings in Toronto's financial district during the early twentieth century

The Architectural design of the building includes elements of traditional bank architecture into a high-rise office structure. Its monumental design is similar to institutional banking buildings hat have the practical requirements of a multi-storey commercial development. Although Ross and Macdonald designed the overall building, Carrière, Hastings and Eustace G. Bird contributed to the design of the original banking hall. The building's adaptation of a traditional temple-form bank design into a high-rise structure was seen as an important architectural characteristic in its original design.

The City of Toronto recognized its historical significance by designating it under the Ontario Heritage Act in 1976. The building received recognition for its adaptation of traditional bank architecture turned into a high-rise commercial building. This heritage designation also acknowledged the contributions of the architectural firms involved in its development as its architectural design was significant to Toronto's skyline.

It is also commonly referred to by its municipal address, 2 King Street East. Standing at 90 meters (300 ft) tall, the building was the tallest in Canada until 1928.

The second building also known as the 12-storey Royal Bank Building, located at 20 King Street West between Yonge and Bay Streets, served as the bank's Toronto offices until the Royal Bank Plaza was completed in 1977 (49 years ago).

Separate from the first Royal Bank Building located at 2 King Street East, the second Royal Bank Building was built on 20 King Street West in the mid-twentieth century demonstrating a different period in the architectural and institutional history of the Royal Bank.

This building was designed by architects Marani, Morris, & Allen.

V.K. Mason Construction Ltd., was involved in the construction phase of the building, while the structural engineering work was completed by C.D. Carruthers and Wallace, according to the records kept by the Architectural Conservancy of Ontario.

It is still one of several buildings in Toronto's downtown core occupied by the Royal Bank. Construction on the building commenced with the laying of the cornerstone by then Royal Bank of Canada Chairman James Allan in 1964.
