= Royal Bank Plaza =

Skyscraper in Toronto, Ontario, Canada

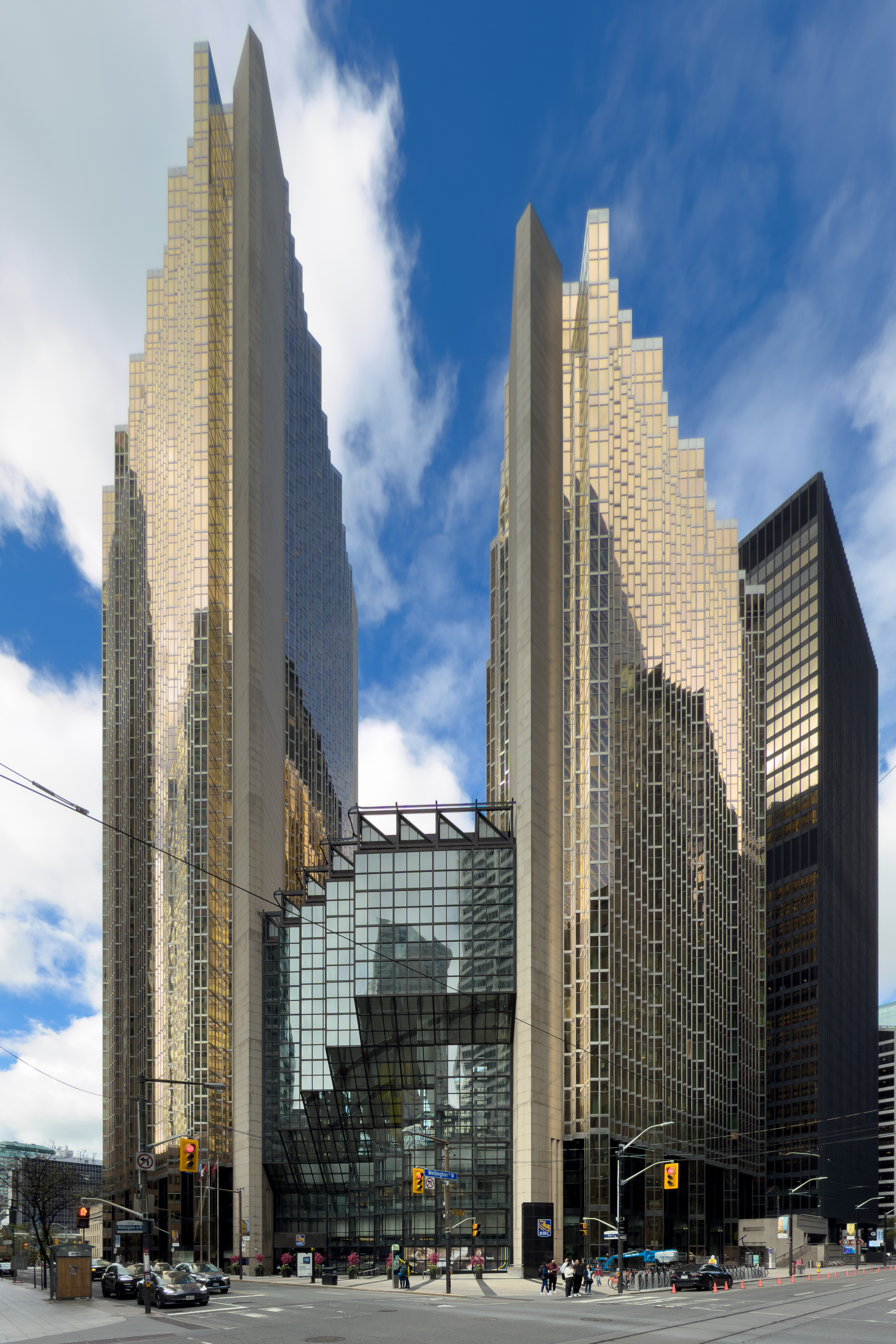
- Interactive map of the Royal Bank Plaza area

General information
- Type: Commercial offices
- Location: 200 Bay Street; Toronto, Ontario, Canada
- Coordinates: 43.646528°N 79.380139°W
- Completed: South Tower: 1979; North Tower: 1976
- Owner: Pontegadea
- Operator: Colliers

Height
- Roof: South Tower: 180 m (590 ft); North Tower: 114 m (374 ft)

Technical details
- Floor count: South Tower: 41; North Tower: 26
- Floor area: 90,855 m^{2} (977,960 sq ft)
- Lifts/elevators: South Tower: 11; North Tower: 6

Design and construction
- Architect: WZMH Architects
- Developer: Y & R Properties Ltd.
- Structural engineer: Quinn Dressel Associates

Royal Bank Plaza is a skyscraper in Toronto, Ontario, Canada that has served as the corporate headquarters for the Royal Bank of Canada since 1976. The building shares with the Fairmont Royal York Hotel the block in Toronto's financial district bordered by Bay, Front, York, and Wellington streets. It is owned by Pontegadea.

== History ==
The building was built to be the new main office of the Royal Bank of Canada after its decision to move its centre of operations from Place Ville Marie in Montreal to Toronto in the late 1970s, although Place Ville Marie remains the bank's head office (a distinct title from its corporate headquarters). Royal Bank Plaza consists of a South Tower and a North Tower. The South Tower, a skyscraper, is the taller of the two at 180 m (591 ft); the North Tower has a height of 112 m (367 ft). The structures each have a triangular footprint and sit on opposing corners of the square site. The exteriors of the structures are largely covered with gold-bronze glass with tan granite accents. Together, both towers contain more than 14,000 windows which project from the facade to form angular bays set into brushed aluminum frames. Six bays are grouped between piers which are covered in the same glass. The upper stories are recessed and contain three larger angled-bays between the piers. The double-height entry is also recessed from the facade and covered in dark-tinted glass set into dark aluminum frames. The glass for the body of the building was manufactured by Canadian Pittsburgh Industries and was coloured using 2,500 oz (71,000 g) of gold, valued at CA$70 per pane at the time of installation.

In addition to office space and the Toronto Main Branch of the Royal Bank, Royal Bank Plaza also contains a shopping concourse which is part of the PATH network, linking directly to the TD Centre as well as Union Station, Brookfield Place (BCE Place) and the Fairmont Royal York. The concourse merchants mall and tower lobbies underwent extensive renovations between 2005 and 2007.

The building was constructed with a large atrium above the main banking hall that linked the two towers, but in the 1990s a trading floor was added, closing the open space.

The bank maintains a presence in a number of other towers in the downtown core, including the Royal Bank Building at 20 King Street West adjacent to Scotia Plaza, the RBC Centre at 155 Wellington Street West, and the building complex at 310, 315, 320 and 330 Front Street West, next to the Metro Toronto Convention Centre, which is also owned by Oxford.

== Notable tenants ==
- Royal Bank of Canada
- Vale S.A.
- HomeEquity Bank
- JPMorgan Chase
- MUFG
- Interac Corporation

== Gallery ==
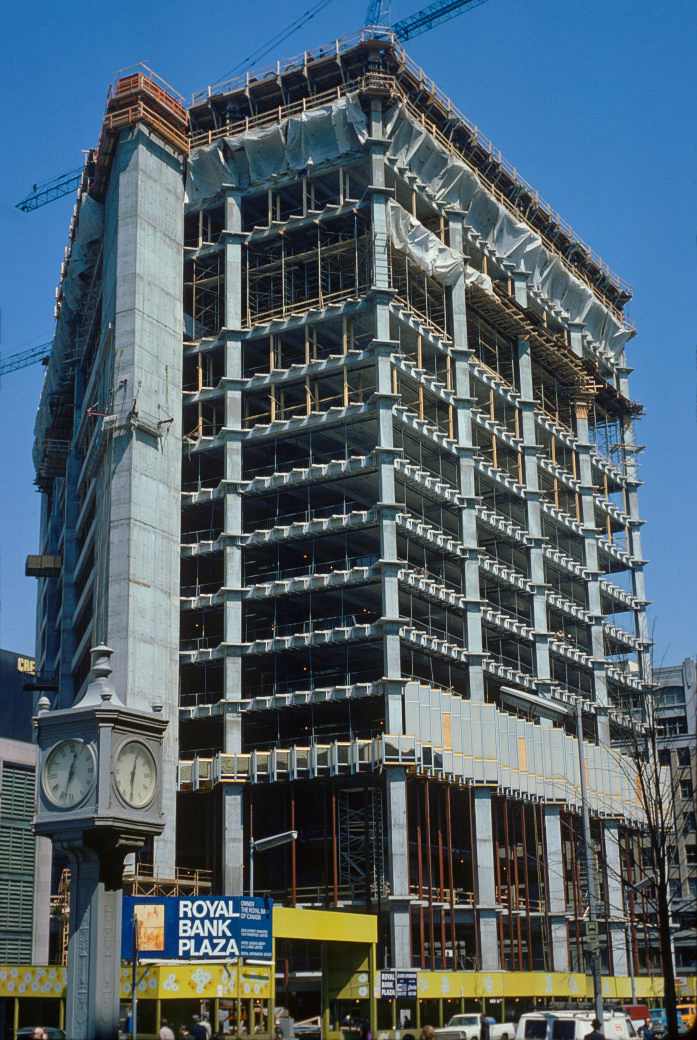
Construction in 1975

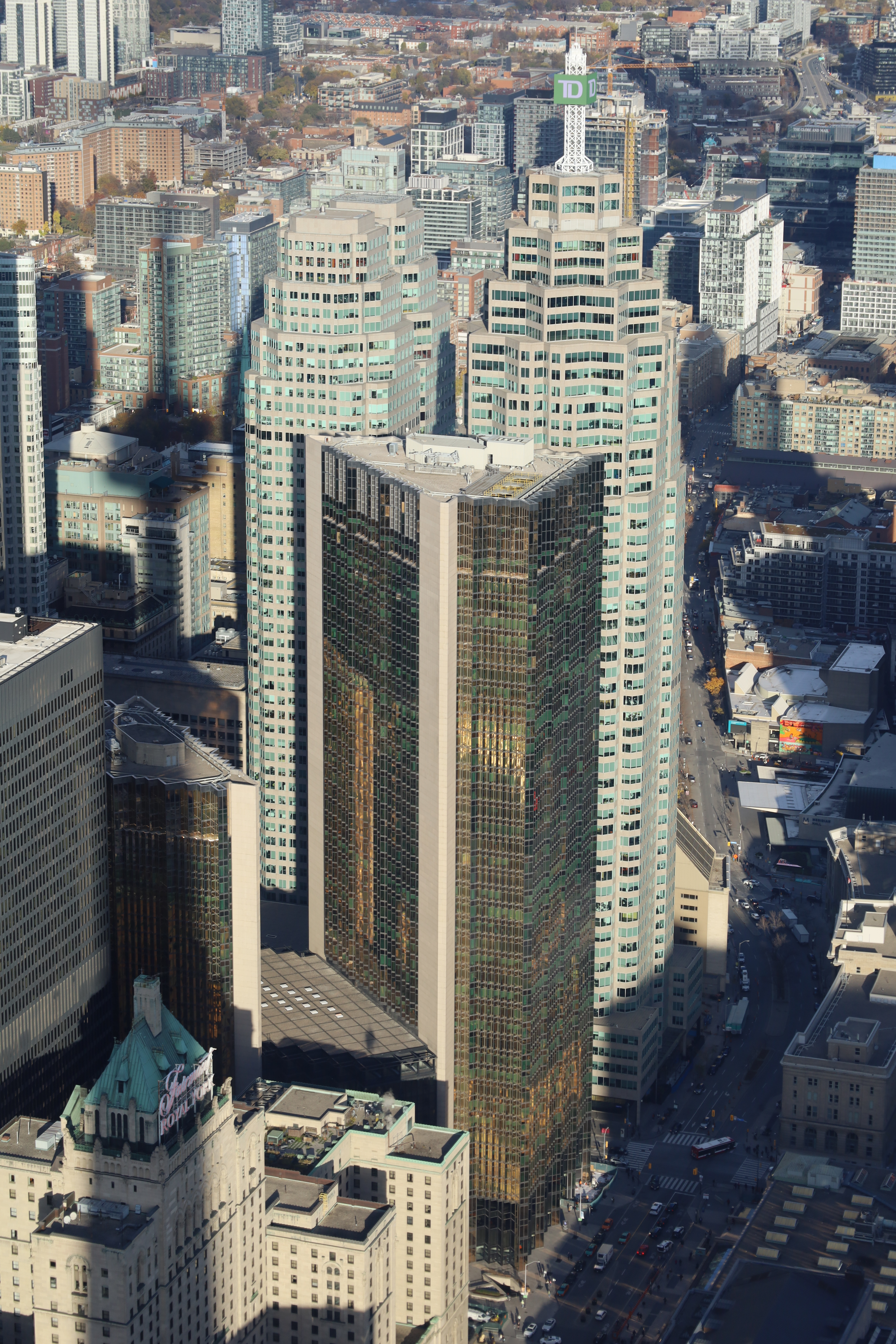
View from the CN Tower in 2023

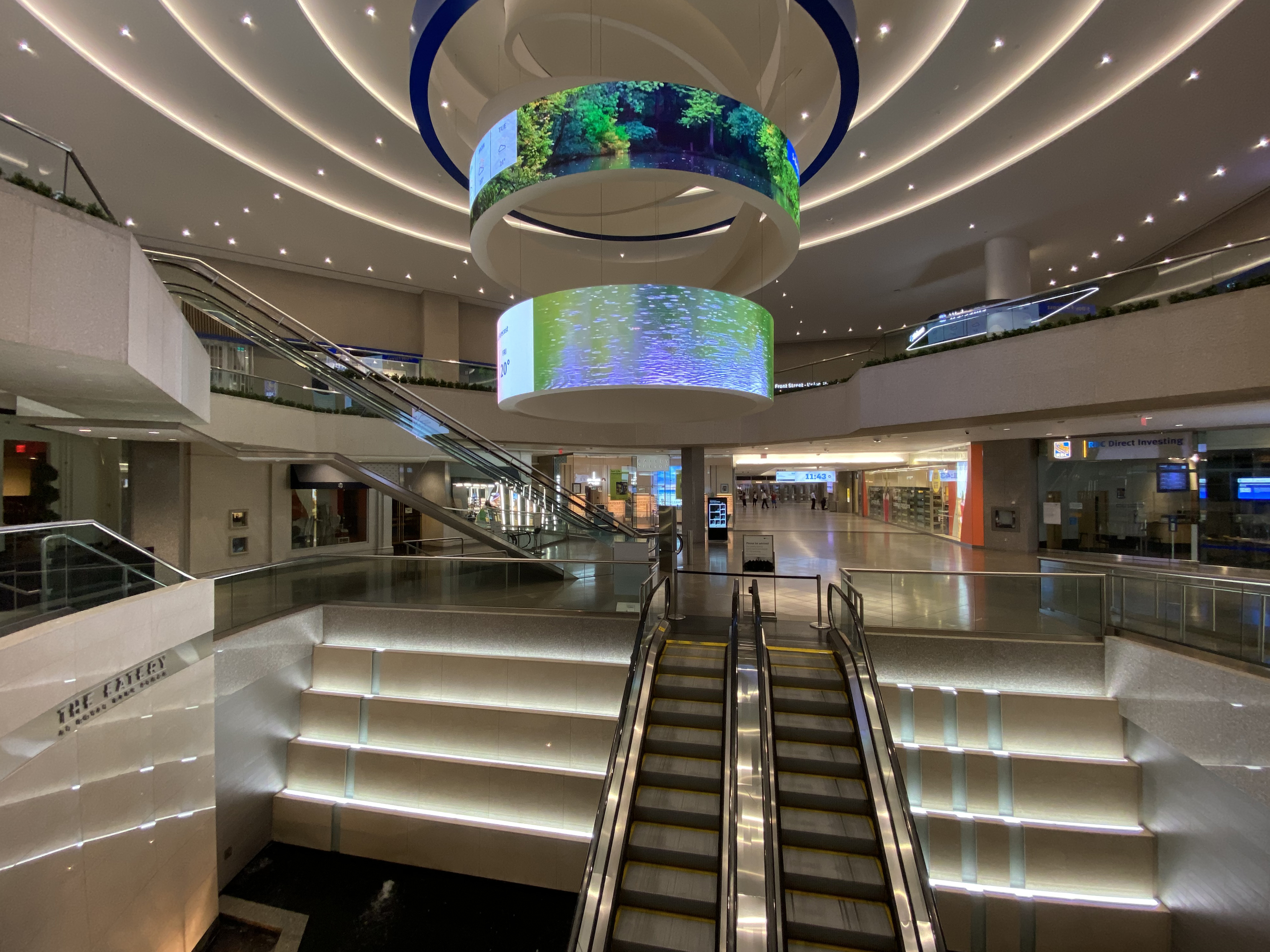
Building contains a shopping concourse which is part of the PATH network

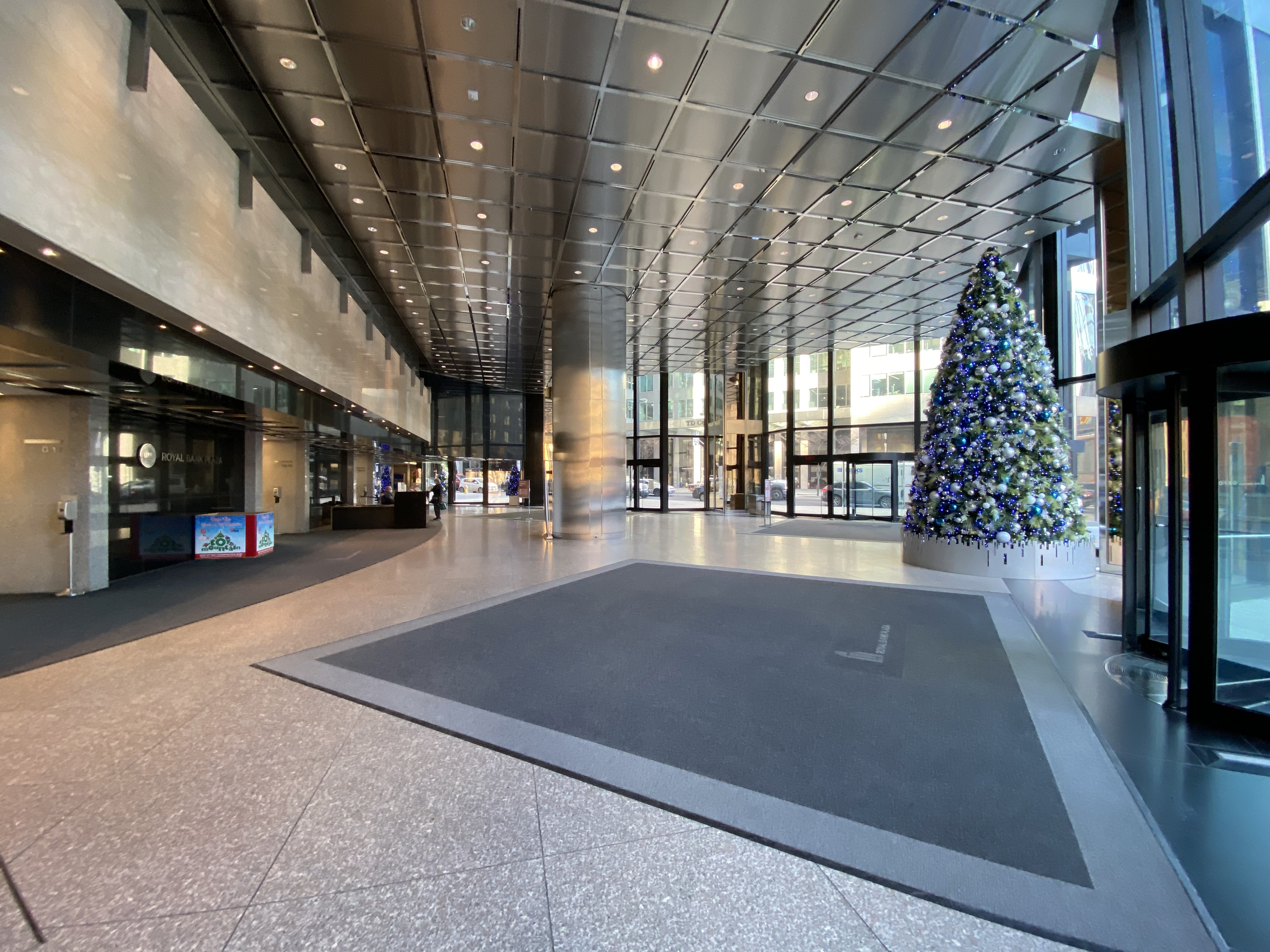
Office Lobby

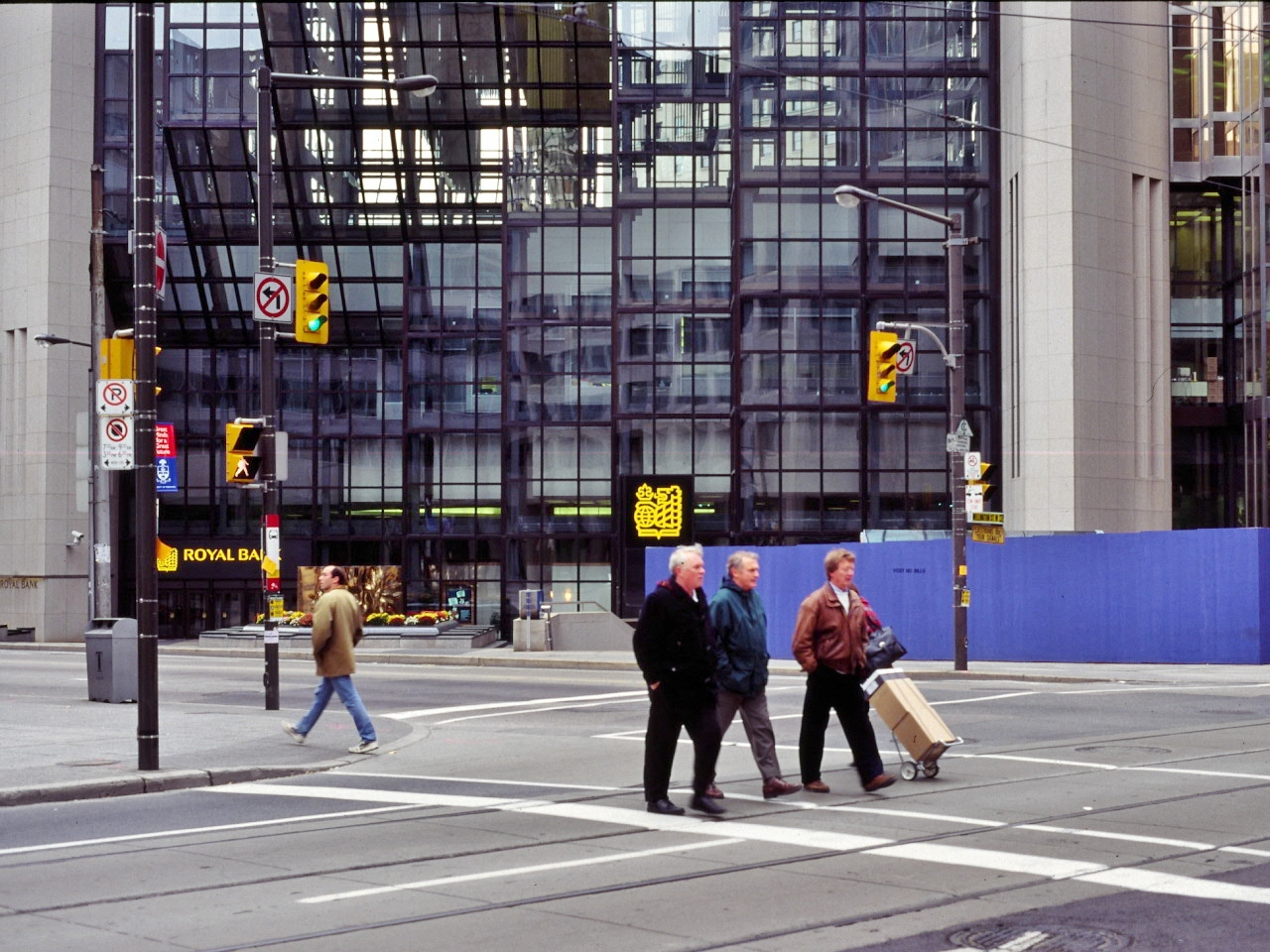
The exteriors of the structures are largely covered with glass (1997)

== See also ==
- List of tallest buildings in Toronto
- List of tallest buildings in Canada
