= Hotels in Toronto =

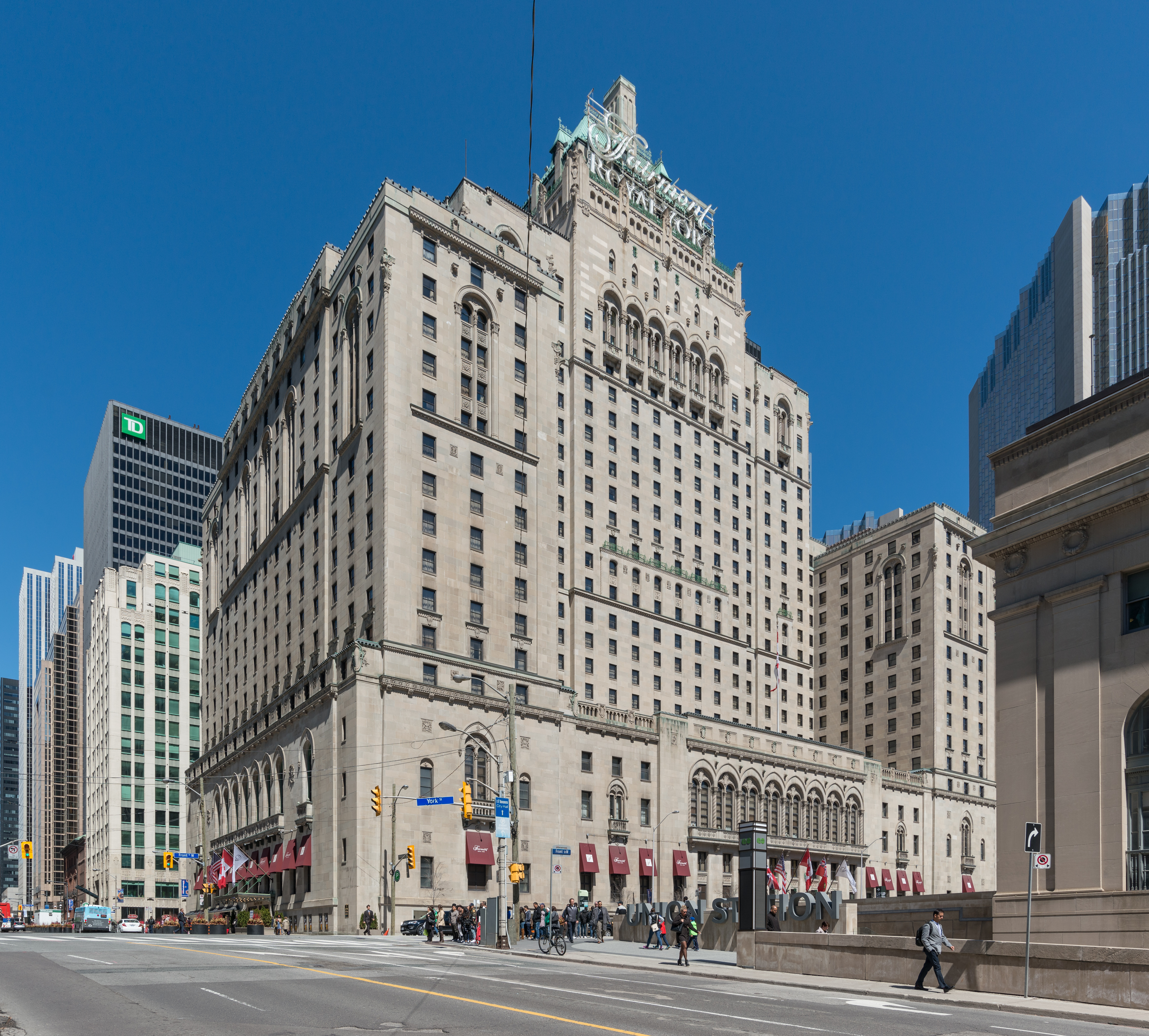
The Royal York Hotel, once the tallest building in Canada, is one of Toronto's most prominent hotels.

Hotels in Toronto have been some of the most prominent buildings in the city and the hotel industry is one of the city's most important. The Greater Toronto Area has 183 hotels with a total of almost 36,000 rooms. In 2010, there were 8.9 million room nights sold. Toronto is a popular tourist destination, with it having the 6th highest room occupancy rate in North America, but about two thirds of rooms are taken by commercial, government, or convention travellers.

Toronto hotels are found in different clusters. The downtown core and financial district has a wide array of hotels. Many are near the Metro Toronto Convention Centre, and others, like the Sheraton Centre Toronto Hotel, have their own substantial convention facilities. North of downtown the upscale Yorkville neighbourhood has many of the city's most luxurious hotels. Hotels such as the Four Seasons, Windsor Arms, and Sutton Place are at the centre of the Toronto International Film Festival each year. Outside of the downtown area around Toronto Pearson International Airport has a cluster of hotels and convention centres. The major highways through town also have a wide array of smaller hotels and motels along them.

== History ==
=== Hotels of York ===
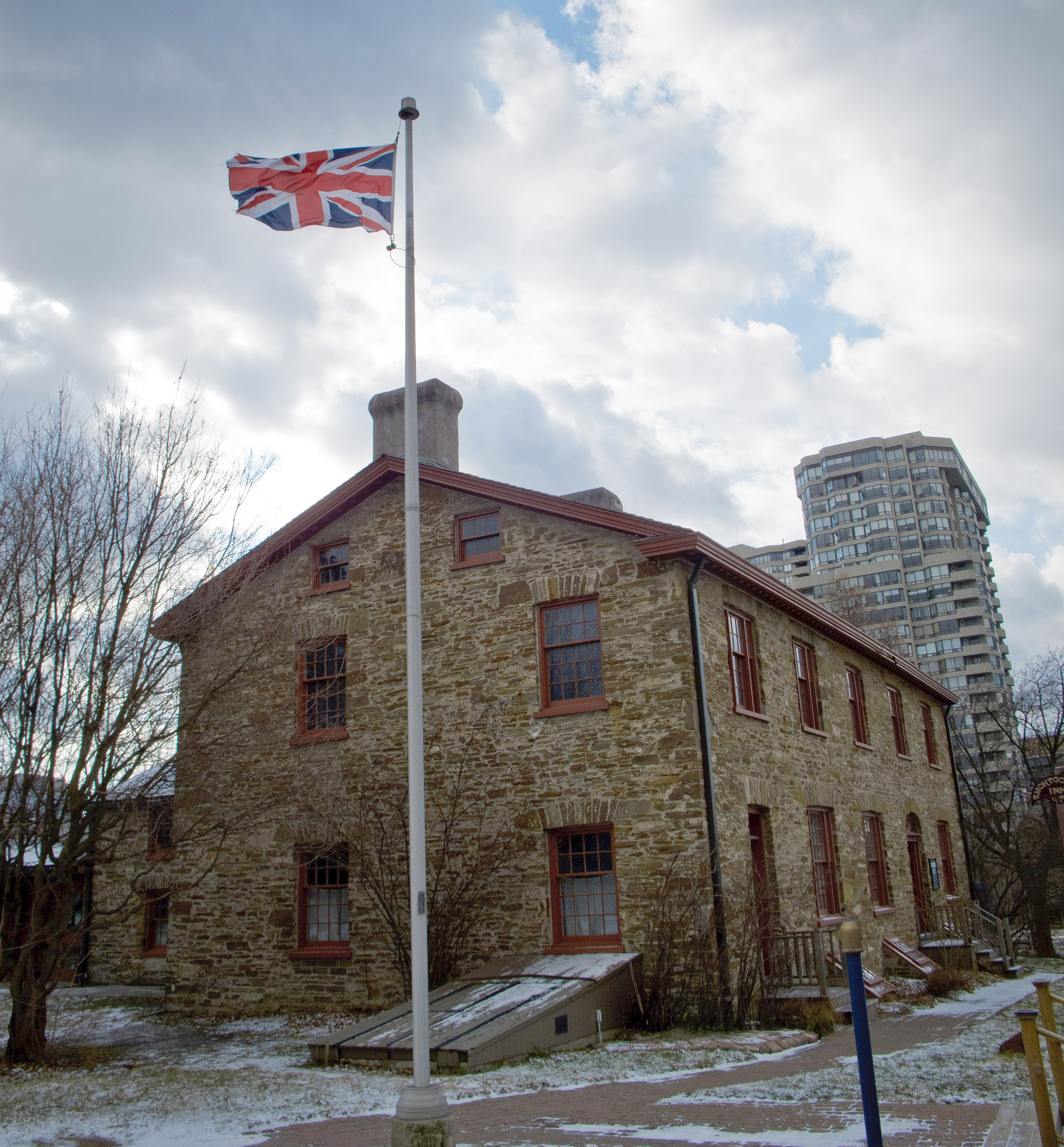
Built in 1832, Montgomery's Inn is the oldest hotel building still standing in Toronto.

Few of Toronto's earliest hotels survive. The first prominent hotel to serve what was then York, Upper Canada was the York Hotel located at King Street East and Berkeley, today the site of the Toronto Sun Building. Built in 1805, it was a central social venue for the city's elite. When the legislature was burned by the Americans during the War of 1812, it was at the York that the assembly met for a year while awaiting the construction of a new building. The York Hotel was demolished in 1846.

Nearby another important early hotel was Frank's Hotel, on nearby Market Square. It is most notable for being Toronto's first theatre venue. Beginning about 1820, travelling troops of actors would put on works of Shakespeare and other plays in the ballroom that sat about 100.

The central hotels served those travelling via the port and those staying in town. For travellers by land small inns and taverns grew up along each of the major routes out of the city. The oldest surviving hotel in Toronto is Montgomery's Inn, which was built in 1832. Now a city of Toronto museum, it is located on Dundas Street, which was then the main road heading westwards. Lambton House is another surviving hotel structure that also served those travelling on Dundas. Most hotels from this era did not survive. Two examples are John Finch's Hotel and the Miller Tavern, both located on Yonge, then the major route north.

=== Railway hotels ===
The arrival of the railroad in the mid-nineteenth century dramatically changed travel patterns, and new hotels from this era were clustered around the railroad stations, most notably Union Station. In 1853 the Knox College building across the street was converted into a hotel. At first named Sword's Hotel, in 1862 it was renamed the Queen's Hotel. For decades it served as the city's most luxurious and elite accommodation. Further north, on the site of the current Toronto Dominion Centre was the Rossin House Hotel. With 252 bedrooms it was the largest hotel in Toronto during this era.

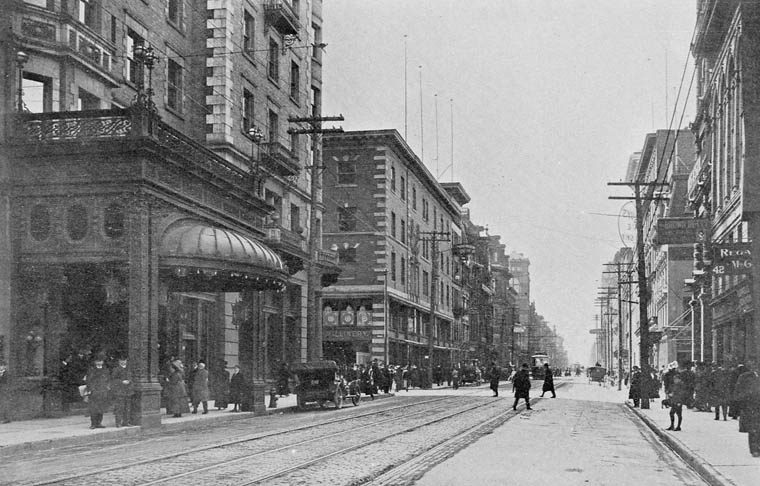
A view of King Street with King Edward Hotel to the left, c. 1907

Outside the central core smaller hotels grew up to serve the stations in what were then the outer reaches of the city. In the west these included the Gladstone Hotel and the Drake Hotel while in the east New Broadview House Hotel and the New Edwin Hotel were built. When the smaller railway stations closed in the middle of the 20th century, these hotels lost their main source of business. They became single room occupancy facilities serving the city's poor and transient. The recent revival of Parkdale has seen the Drake and Gladstone transformed in boutique hotels and cultural venues.

The twentieth century saw a new generation of hotels, much larger and more monumental than before as the skyscraper came to prominence. The King Edward Hotel was established in 1903, and is the oldest major hotel still in operation in the city. In 1927 the Queen's Hotel was demolished and replaced by the Royal York Hotel. At the time the new hotel was the tallest building in Canada and quickly became the city's most elite lodging.

Serving a different market the 750 room Ford Hotel opened in 1928 offering very cheap rooms. It quickly became known as a centre of crime and vice and for the risqué entertainment in its bars. In the northern part of the city this era also saw the erection of the Park Plaza in 1929.

=== Motel era ===
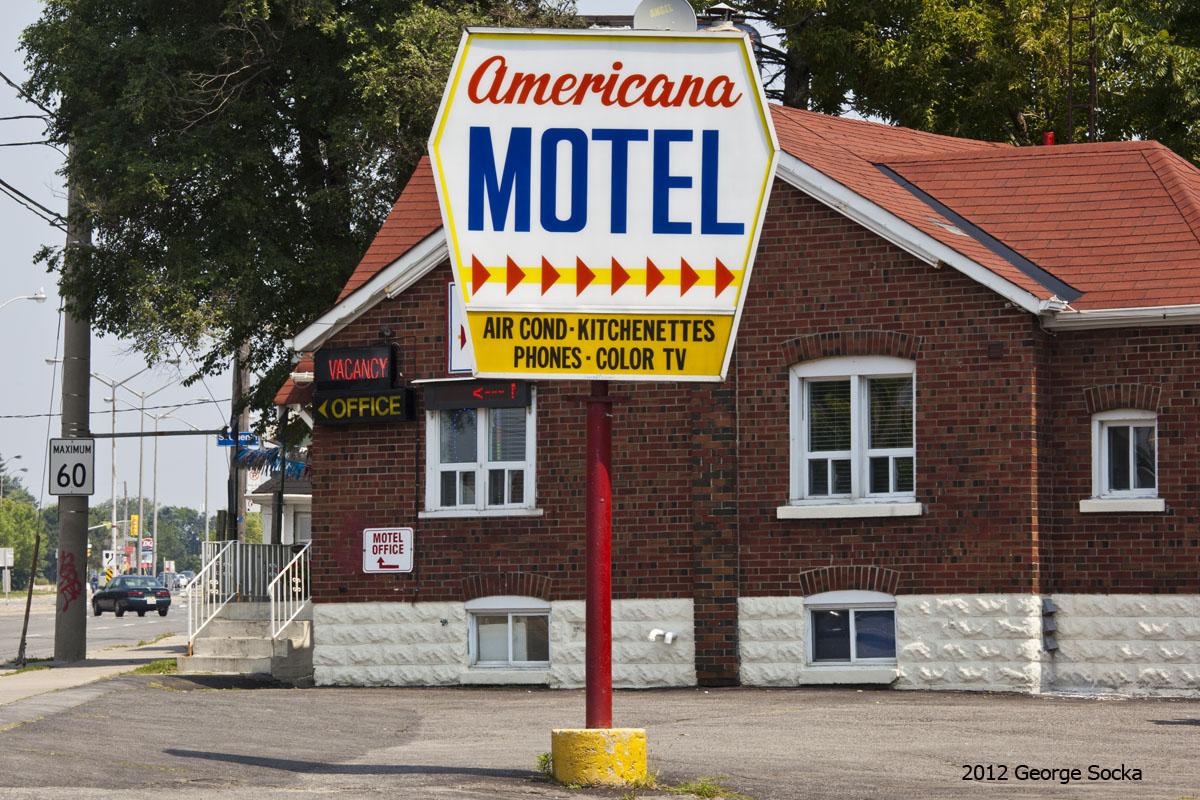
A motel on Kingston Road. The road developed as a motel strip in the 1950s, with a number of motels remaining in operation today.

The arrival of the automobile transformed travel to Toronto. The motel quickly became one of the most popular hotel forms. In the 1950s and 1960s this led to the creation of Toronto's famous "motel strip" along Lake Shore Boulevard, then the main western route out of the city. At its height the strip had many motels, each attempting to draw attention through eye catching architecture and street side advertising. In 1954 Highway 401 was built to the north of the city, and much traffic was redirected there; in 1966 the Gardiner Expressway almost wholly redirected remaining intercity traffic away from the area. The strip declined rapidly and by the 1980s the area was most known for its prostitution and gunfights. The recent condo boom in Toronto has seen most of the motels closed and demolished to be replaced with condo towers looking out over the lake. As of 2008 five structures remain only two of which are operational.

A similar, but less prominent, strip developed along Kingston Road in Scarborough, then the main eastern route out of town. Many of these still remain in operation, such as the iconic Hav-A-Nap Motel. While inner city travellers are less likely to take Kingston Road, today some of the Scarborough motel rooms have been rented for refugees awaiting decision on their claims, with up to 700 rooms arranged by Toronto's community services department. Smaller motel strips also exist in Mississauga along Lakeshore Road and on Dundas Street east of Dixie Road to Etobicoke Creek. As Highway 401 rose to become Canada's busiest highway, it also became the centre of many hotel developments. Today there are dozens of hotels, mostly chain owned, located along the 401 in Toronto and many others in the rest of the Greater Toronto Area.

=== Modern Toronto ===
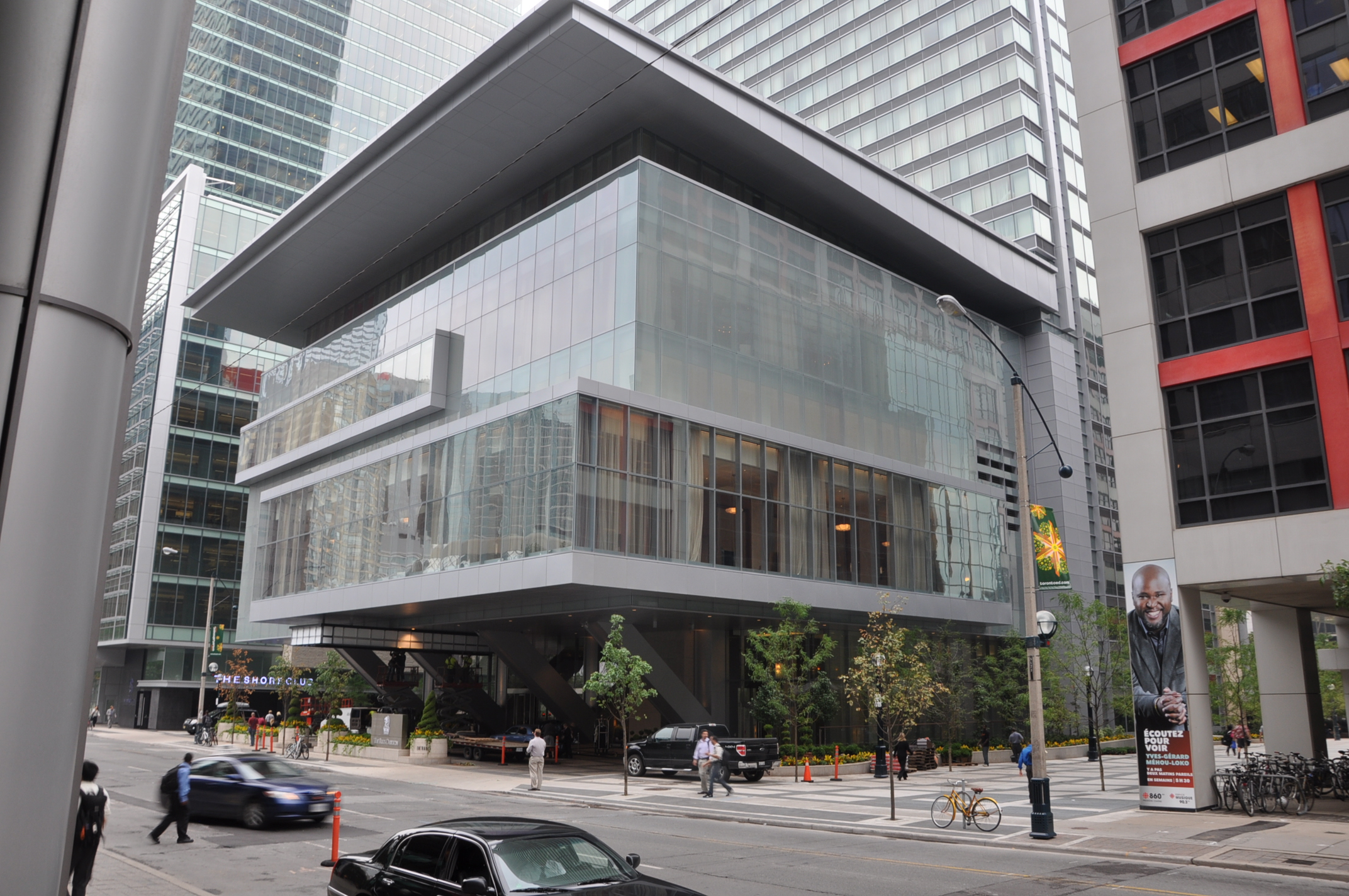
Entrance to the Ritz-Carlton Toronto, one of several major hotel developments in the 2010s

The 1970s and 1980s saw a number of major hotel projects in central Toronto, with the Sheraton Centre, Toronto Hilton, Sutton Place, and Four Seasons adding thousands of new rooms to the market. The economic downturn at the end of the 1980s saw several hotels run into financial trouble. The Park Plaza, a Yorkville landmark since 1929, went into receivership in 1995 and was later bought by the Hyatt hotel chain. The nearby Windsor Arms Hotel closed completely for several years. Following a recovery in the late 1990s, another recession hurt the industry in 2001. In 2003 the hotel industry was badly hurt by the SARS outbreak that saw room occupancy rates plunge to 29%, far below the usual range in the 70s. In that year the Colony Hotel shut down and was turned into a University of Toronto student residence.

In recent years a booming real estate market, especially in downtown Toronto, has led to a number of new hotel projects, often in combination with condominium projects. An unprecedented number of major hotel projects were completed in central Toronto, including The St. Regis, Hotel X, the Ritz-Carlton, the Delta Toronto Hotel, Living Shangri-La, and a new Four Seasons. Despite this real estate boom, the number of a hotel rooms within the City of Toronto declined from 25,573 (2000) to 25,281 (2015).

== Discount hotels ==
Suburban hotels in Toronto are primarily discount variety and is a cross of hotel and motel concept. Since the 1990s they have been marketed as business hotels. A list of chains operating in Toronto:

- Crowne Plaza
- Econo Lodge
- Howard Johnson's
- Holiday Inn Express and Holiday Inn
- Hilton Garden Inn
- Novotel
- Ramada
- Radisson Hotels
- Days Inns - Canada

== Boutique hotels ==
Boutique hotels in Toronto are typically small capacity hotels that have been marketed to provide individualized guest services and an intimate city hotel experience. A list of boutique hotels in Toronto:

- Sutton Place Hotel Toronto
- Drake Hotel (Toronto)
- Union Hotel (Toronto)
- Gladstone Hotel (Toronto)
- Kimpton Saint George (Toronto)
- Ace Hotel Toronto

== See also ==
- Architecture of Toronto
- Economy of Toronto
