= Donald J. Smith =

Canadian entrepreneur (1924–2013)

- Born: Donald James Smith; March 23, 1924; Provost, Alberta, Canada
- Died: July 16, 2013 (aged 89); London, Ontario, Canada
- Occupations: Entrepreneur; philanthropist
- Years active: 1951–1996
- Organization: EllisDon Corp.

Donald James Smith (23 March 1924 – 16 July 2013) was a Canadian entrepreneur who co-founded the construction company EllisDon and served as its president and chief executive officer. He was also active in philanthropy and fundraising for the Ontario Liberal Party.

== Early life ==
Smith was born on March 23, 1924 in Provost, Alberta, to Donald Bennett Smith and Florence Marie Ellis.

Smith's father worked as a bank manager. In 1929, during the Great Depression, he suffered financial losses that led to his death the following year. The family faced considerable financial hardship during this period. Facing limited opportunities in Provost, the family relocated to North Toronto where Smith's mother worked as a sales clerk at Eaton's department store.

At age 10, Smith received a toy movie projector and began hosting screenings of Charlie Chaplin films in his basement for local neighborhood children, charging five cents per screening. During his teenage years, he worked as a paperboy for the Toronto Star.

Smith later enrolled in the engineering program at the University of Toronto. While studying he worked at the Foundation Company and became a superintendent at age 25.

In January 1949, Smith married Elizabeth Joan McDonald and moved to London, Ontario. Their first child was born that November. The couple went on to have seven children. Elizabeth was a graduate of the University of Toronto with a degree in philosophy. She later worked in charitable organizations and became involved in municipal and provincial politics.

== Career ==
On April 1, 1951, Smith and his brother David founded the construction company EllisDon. The company's name combined Donald's first name with David's middle name, Ellis. Their first project was a small home renovation funded by their mother, who served as the company's bookkeeper. On its first day of operation, the company received a contract to construct a three-room schoolhouse, Northdale Public School, in London, Ontario.

Shortly after its founding, David Smith left the business and relocated to Calgary.

Under Donald Smith's leadership, EllisDon expanded its operations beyond small local projects to larger institutional and commercial developments. During the 1950s and 1960s, the company adopted new construction technologies and expanded its project portfolio. In 1971, EllisDon implemented a corporate safety program aimed at improving job-site safety.

During the 1970s, the company expanded into additional Canadian markets and began working on international projects, including work in Saudi Arabia.

EllisDon later completed several major projects in Canada, including the Metro Toronto Convention Centre and the stadium then known as SkyDome (now Rogers Centre), which opened in 1989.

Smith retired from EllisDon in 1996 and was succeeded as president and chief executive officer by his son, Geoff Smith.

== Philanthropy ==
Smith supported a number of charitable and community organizations. He was involved in fundraising efforts for several causes and community programs.

In 1967, while serving as president of the London Club, Smith publicly opposed the exclusion of Jewish applicants from membership. He supported the application of a Jewish lawyer seeking admission and advocated for the club to admit Jewish members.

Smith later became involved with the Boys and Girls Club of London. Beginning in 1974, EllisDon participated in construction and renovation work for the organization, including the development of recreational facilities. Smith was also involved in fundraising efforts for the organization.

In 2008, Smith and his daughter Lynne Cram organized the Horizons Campaign to support the M.A.P. Program (My Action Plan for Education), which assists youth from Grade 4 through post-secondary education in pursuing academic goals.

Smith also supported Fanshawe College and other community organizations.

== Politics ==
Smith was active in the Ontario Liberal Party. On February 17, 1985, he was elected President of the party and also served as a chief fundraiser for the government of Premier David Peterson.

== Death ==
Smith died on July 16, 2013 in London, Ontario, at the age of 89, following a prolonged illness. A celebration of his life was held on July 23, 2013 at the London Hunt Club.

== Awards ==
Smith received a Lifetime Achievement Award from the Canadian Council of Christians and Jews in recognition of his opposition to discrimination in private clubs in London, Ontario.

In May 2014, he was posthumously inducted into the Canadian Business Hall of Fame.
