= Strathcona Hotel =

Strathcona Hotel may refer to:

- Strathcona Hotel (Alberta), a hotel in Old Strathcona, Edmonton, Alberta
- Strathcona Hotel (Toronto)
- A historic hotel in Victoria, British Columbia
