= Hyatt Regency Toronto =

Hotel in Toronto, Ontario

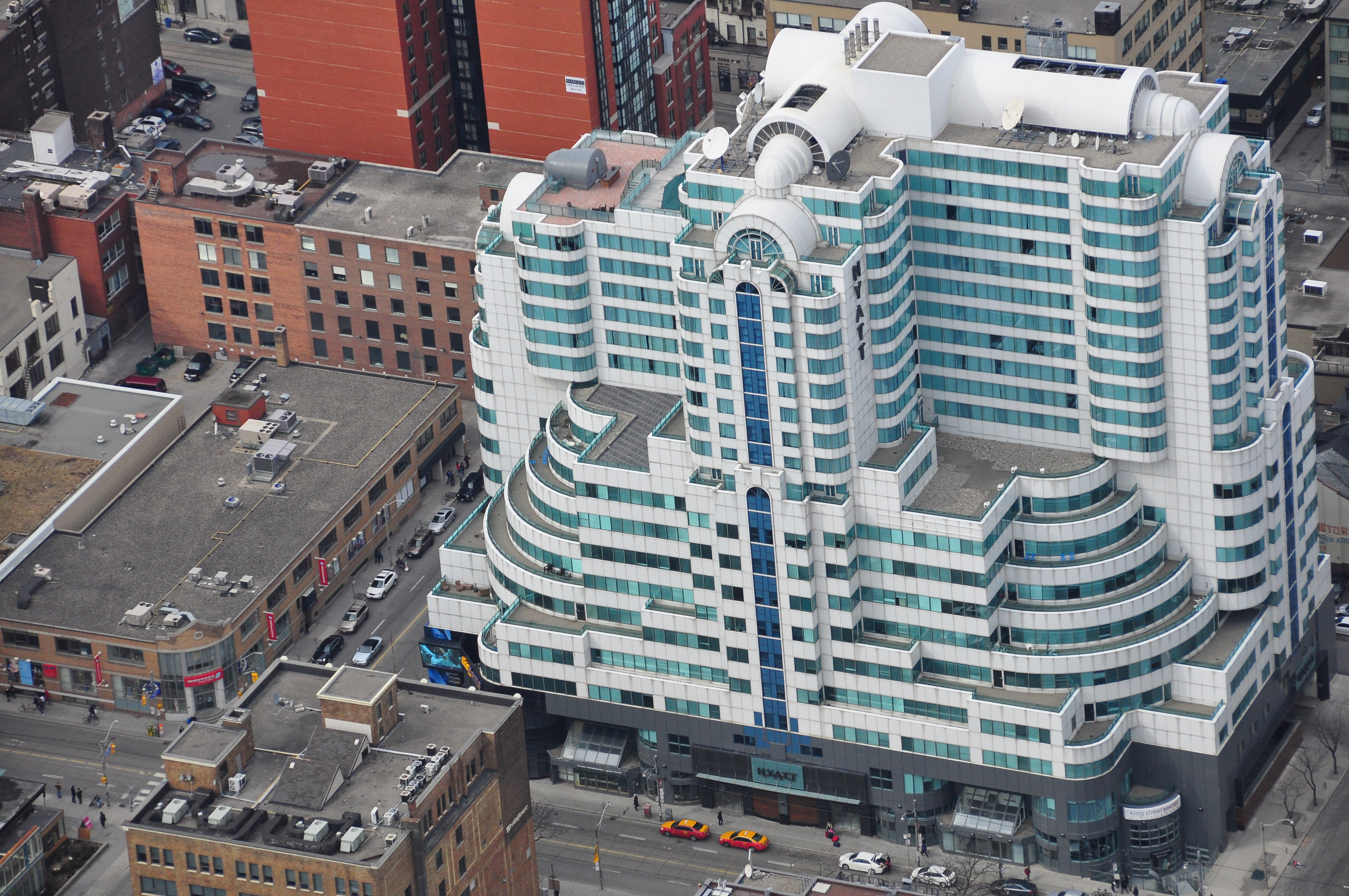
- Hyatt Regency Toronto
- Interactive map of the Hyatt Regency Toronto area
- Hotel chain: Hyatt Hotels & Resorts

General information
- Location: Toronto, Ontario, 370 King Street West
- Coordinates: 43°38′47″N 79°23′30″W
- Opening: 1990 (as Holiday Inn); 2009 (as Hyatt Regency)
- Renovated: 2008–2009
- Owner: King Street Enterprises

Technical details
- Floor count: 19

Design and construction
- Architects: Darling & Downey
- Developer: Graywood Developments

Other information
- Number of rooms: 394
- Number of suites: 32
- Number of restaurants: 2

Website
- www.hyatt.com/en-US/hotel/canada/hyatt-regency-toronto/torrt

The Hyatt Regency Toronto is a 394-room, 19-floor hotel in the Entertainment District of Toronto, Ontario. The hotel opened as a Holiday Inn in 1990 and has been operated by Hyatt since 2009.

== History ==
The hotel opened in 1990, managed by Holiday Inn as the Holiday Inn on King. It was designed by architectural firm Darling & Downey and constructed by EllisDon. On March 3, 2009, following renovations, the hotel reopened under the Hyatt Regency brand as the Hyatt Regency Toronto.

The first Hyatt Regency Toronto opened in 1972 at 21 Avenue Road in Yorkville. In 1978, the hotel was bought by Isadore Sharp and renamed the Four Seasons Hotel Toronto. In 1999, Hyatt purchased the Park Plaza Hotel for $107 million and it now operates under their top-tier Park Hyatt brand.

== See also ==
- Hotels in Toronto
- Park Hyatt Toronto
- Four Seasons Hotel and Residences Toronto
