= Park Hyatt Toronto =

Historic hotel in Toronto, Ontario

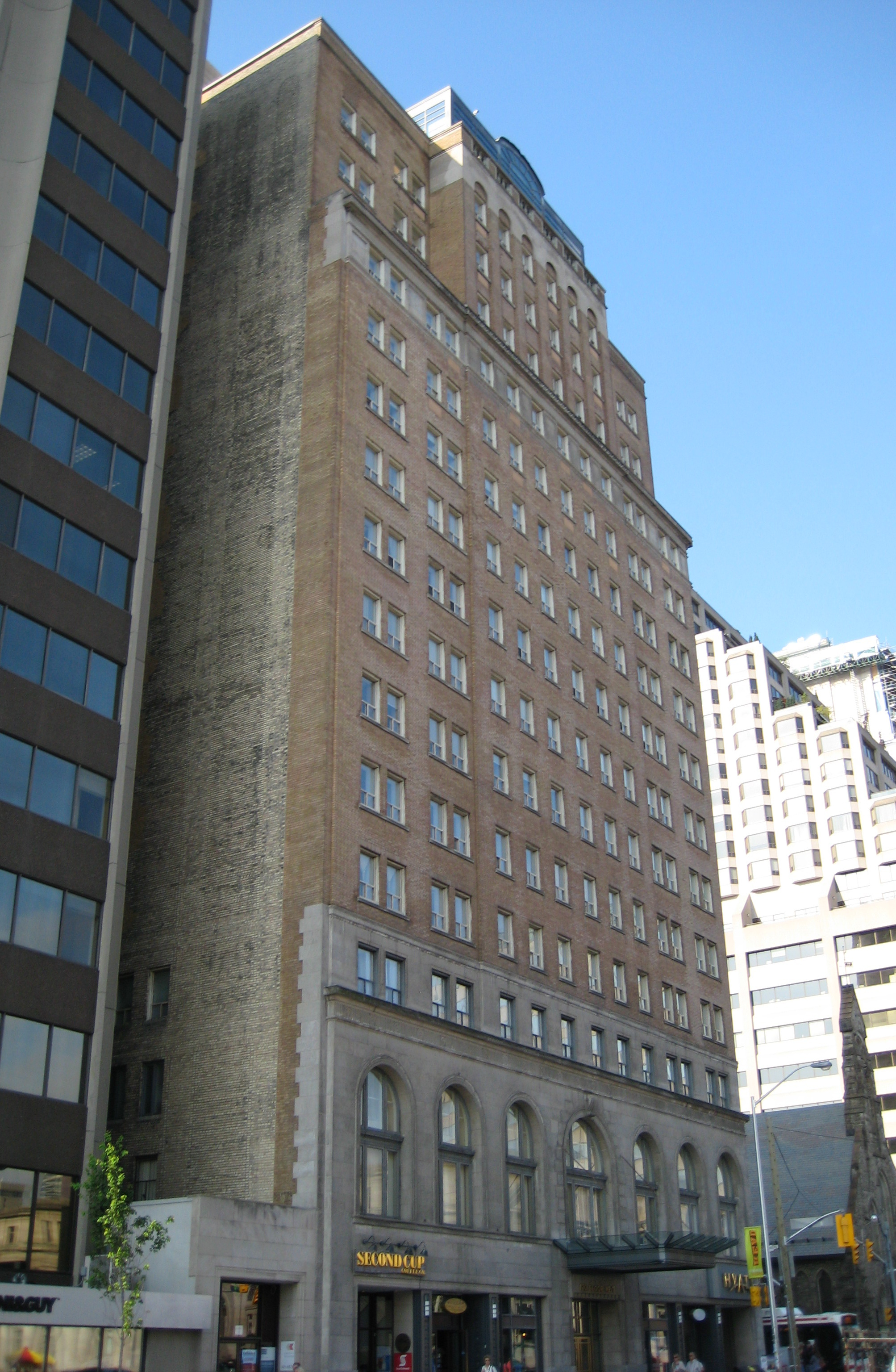
- The 1936 south tower

- Location in Toronto
- Hotel chain: Park Hyatt

General information
- Architectural style: Art Deco/Chicago School - south Modernist - north
- Location: 4 Avenue Road; Toronto, Ontario; M5R 2E8
- Coordinates: 43°40′8.25″N 79°23′40.7″W
- Opened: 1936 - south 1956 - north
- Owner: Oxford Properties
- Operator: Hyatt

Height
- Height: 52 metres (170.6 ft)

Technical details
- Floor count: 17 - south 14 - north

Design and construction
- Architects: Hugh Gordon Holman - south Peter Dickinson - north

Other information
- Number of rooms: 219
- Number of suites: 40
- Number of restaurants: 2
- Parking: underground via Park Hyatt North wing

Website
- Official website

The Park Hyatt Toronto is a historic hotel in Toronto, Ontario, Canada. Located in Annex neighbourhood, the hotel was opened in 1936 as the Park Plaza Hotel.

== History ==
=== The site ===
The hotel is located at the northwestern corner of Bloor Street and Avenue Road. The first known building on the site was a small wayside inn built in 1820 and named Tecumseh Wigwam. Then a considerable distance from the city, it served travellers on their way north out of town. The inn was demolished around 1875.

=== Park Plaza Hotel ===
Originally named the Queen's Park Plaza Hotel, the structure was designed by Hugh Gordon Holman. Construction began in 1928 and was due to be completed in 1929. However, the stock market crash and the beginning of the Great Depression caused its builder to go out of business. The steel framed structure was left partially completed for several years, as various attempts to restart it failed.

The hotel was finally completed as The Park Plaza Hotel and opened on July 11, 1936. The Park Plaza was expanded in 1956 with a second annex tower directly to the north, a modernist structure designed by Peter Dickinson.

Located across the street from the University of Toronto the hotel became known as a centre for Canadian literature, attracting authors, especially to the rooftop patio. As a result, the hotel has appeared in works by a number of Canadian writers including Margaret Atwood, Morley Callaghan, Mordecai Richler, and Hugh Garner. Near Queen's Park, it was also a popular site for many provincial government officials, with the Premier Bill Davis government's "Big Blue Machine" holding frequent meetings there.

In 1995, the hotel went into receivership, but was purchased by new owners who began a complete overhaul, adding such features as an almost 2,000-square-foot (190 m^{2}) penthouse, to woo back the wealthiest guests.

=== Park Hyatt Toronto ===
In 1999 Hyatt purchased the hotel for $107 million, calculated to be the highest cost per room ever paid in Canada, and renamed it Park Hyatt Toronto. In 2014, Hyatt sold the hotel to Toronto-based Oxford Properties, for US$90 million, with an encumbrance that the hotel remain operated as a Hyatt for at least 40 years.

Oxford closed the hotel on December 1, 2017, for an extensive renovation. The 1936 south tower was converted to 65 luxury rental units, marketed as Two Avenue Road, but still operated as part of the hotel complex. The 1956 north tower was completely renovated, to continue operating as a 219-room hotel. The two-story podium and vehicle forecourt that connected the towers was demolished and replaced by a new larger podium that makes up a streetwall. The hotel reopened on September 15, 2021.

== See also ==
- Hotels in Toronto
- Four Seasons Hotel and Residences and Four Seasons Hotel Toronto
- Shangri-La Toronto
- Hyatt Regency Toronto
