= Geoff Smith (businessman) =

Canadian businessman (born 1955)

- Born: August 26, 1955 (age 71); London, Ontario
- Occupations: Executive chair of board of directors EllisDon Corp.
- Years active: 1982-present
- Organization: EllisDon Corp.
- Parent: Donald J. Smith Joan MacDonald Smith

Geoff Smith (born August 26, 1955) is a Canadian businessman. He is the executive chairperson, and director of EllisDon Corporation, a construction services company founded by his father Don Smith in Ontario.

== Early life ==
Smith is one of seven children born to Donald J. Smith and Joan MacDonald. His father Don, the original President and CEO of EllisDon Corporation, founded the company on April Fool's Day in 1951, with Geoff's uncle, David Ellis Smith.

Smith's mother Joan, a University of Toronto graduate with a degree in philosophy, began her career in public and charitable service before moving on to municipal and provincial politics. She was also the bookkeeper during the company's early years.

Smith attended the University of Toronto and graduated with a Bachelor of Laws Degree in 1979. In 1981, he was admitted to the Ontario Bar.

== Career ==
After a one-year stint at a law firm, Smith became involved in the family business and joined EllisDon in 1982. Smith worked in various sectors including project management, field operations, business development, and communications services. He also served as Vice President for Western Canada, and was eventually appointed chief operations officer (COO) in 1989.

In 1996, Don Smith's position at EllisDon was bought out by his children, and he retired. Geoff took over as President and CEO of EllisDon, a position he held until June 2023, whereupon he took on the role executive chairman.

== Other activities ==
Smith is a current member of both the Canadian Council of Chief Executives, and the Canadian Council for Public-Private Partnerships. Smith has also served as a Curriculum Development Advisor for Toronto Metropolitan University (formerly Ryerson University), and has previously chaired the Ontario Liberal Fund, as well as Technology in the City, a partnership campaign for George Brown College that raised over $15 million.

== Awards ==
In October 2011, Smith received the Jock Tindale Memorial Award of the Ontario General Contractors Association.

In October 2013, Smith was named Ernst & Young's EY Entrepreneur of the Year for the Ontario region. Within the same year, Smith was also named EY Canada's Entrepreneur of the Year.

EllisDon has also won awards during Smith's tenure as president.
