= Fairmont Royal York =

Historic hotel in Toronto, Canada

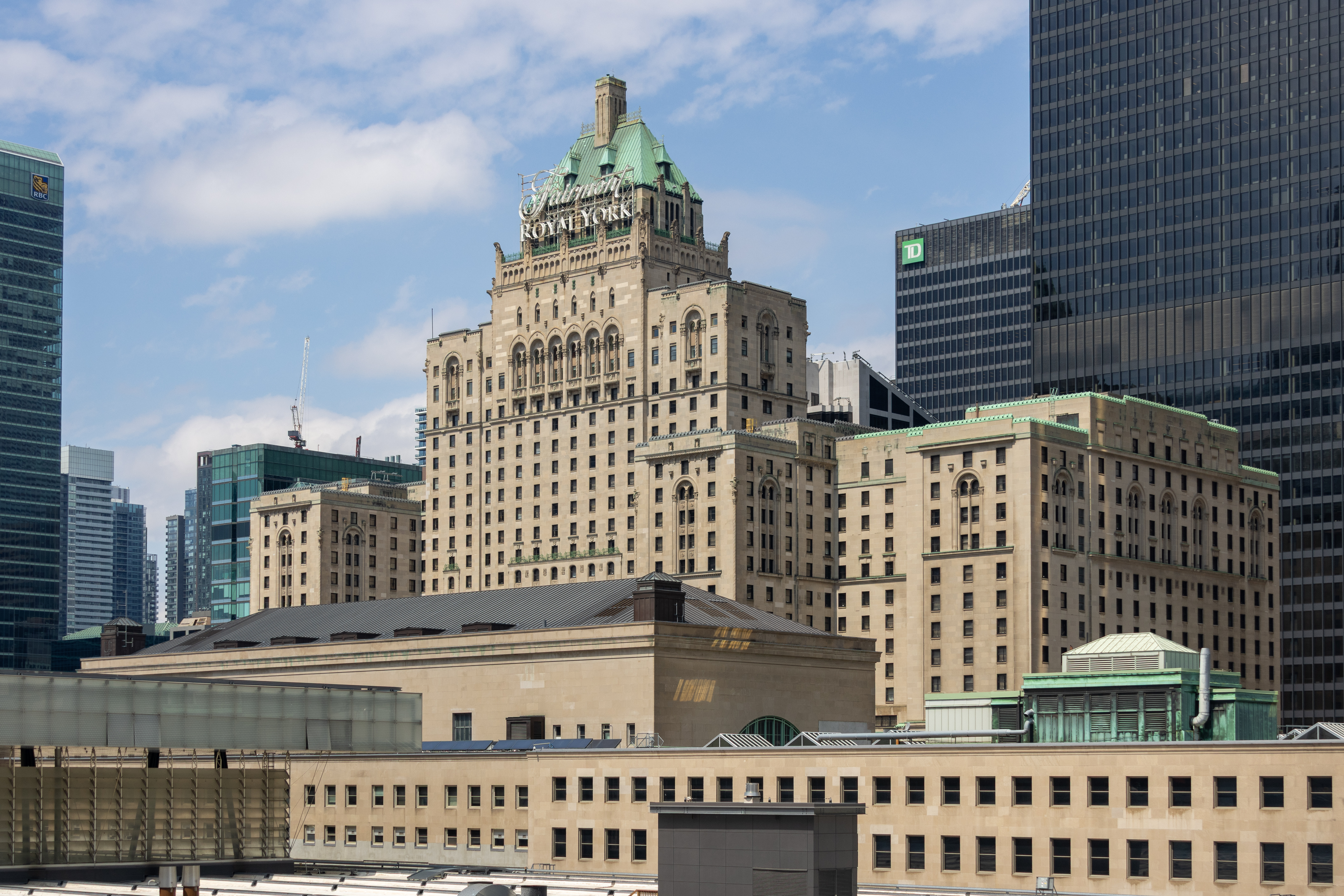
- The hotel with Union Station in foreground
- Former names: Royal York (1929–2001)

Record height
- Tallest in the British Empire from 1929 to 1931^{[I]}
- Preceded by: Royal Bank Tower
- Surpassed by: Canadian Bank of Commerce Tower

General information
- Architectural style: Châteauesque
- Location: 100 Front Street West; Toronto, Ontario, Canada; M5J 1E3
- Coordinates: 43.646133°N 79.381561°W
- Construction started: 1927
- Opened: 1929; 97 years ago
- Owner: KingSett Capital Inc. (60%); InnVest Hotels LP (20%); Ivanhoé Cambridge (20%)
- Operator: Fairmont Hotels and Resorts

Height
- Height: 124 m (407 ft)

Technical details
- Floor count: 28

Design and construction
- Architecture firm: Ross and Macdonald; Sproatt and Rolph
- Developer: Canadian Pacific Railway

Other information
- Number of rooms: 1,363
- Number of restaurants: 3

Website
- www.fairmont.com/royalyork

Ontario Heritage Act
- Official name: Union Station Heritage Conservation District
- Designated: 27 February 2006

The Fairmont Royal York, formerly and still commonly known as the Royal York, is a large historic luxury hotel in Toronto, Ontario, Canada. Located along Front Street West, the hotel is situated at the southern end of the Financial District, in Downtown Toronto. The Royal York was designed by Ross and Macdonald, in association with Sproatt and Rolph, and built by the Canadian Pacific Railway company. The hotel is currently managed by Fairmont Hotels and Resorts.

Opened on 11 June 1929, the Châteauesque-styled building is 124 metres (407 ft) tall, and contains 28 floors. It is considered one of the grand railway hotels of Canada. After its completion, the building was briefly the tallest building in Toronto, as well as the tallest building in the country, and the British Empire, until the nearby Canadian Bank of Commerce Tower was built the following year. The building has undergone several extensive renovations since it first opened, with its first major renovation in 1972. An underground walkway linking the hotel with the Royal Bank Plaza and Union Station form part of Toronto's PATH underground city system.

== Location ==
The Royal York Hotel sits at 100 Front Street West at the southern end of the Financial District, a business district in Downtown Toronto. The hotel property is bounded by Piper Street to the north, and York Street to the west, whereas its eastern portion is bounded by Royal Bank Plaza, an office complex that serves as the operational headquarters of the Royal Bank of Canada. Union Station, the city's main intermodal transportation hub, is located south of the hotel, across Front Street West. The Royal York was not the first hotel built on the site. The first hotel was built in 1843 and was originally known as the Ontario Terrace. It consisted of four brick houses and was later occupied by Knox College, a seminary. The former hotel was later demolished to make way for the Royal York.

Located at the southern end of the Financial District, near Bay Street, the hotel is situated within Canada's financial centre. Its southerly location within the Financial District also places the hotel near several downtown neighbourhoods. Southwest of the Financial District is the Entertainment District, whereas the neighbourhoods of St. Lawrence and South Core are located to the east, and south of the Financial District.

The hotel building forms a part of the Union Station Heritage Conservation District, a historic district surrounding Union Station. The creation of the historic district was through the Ontario Heritage Act, and was enacted by Toronto City Council in July 2006. Given its overlap with the Financial District, the historic district is an eclectic collection of buildings, with structures dating from the 1850s to the present day. Historic buildings within this district include the Dominion Public Building, and The Toronto Club.

== Design ==
=== Architecture ===
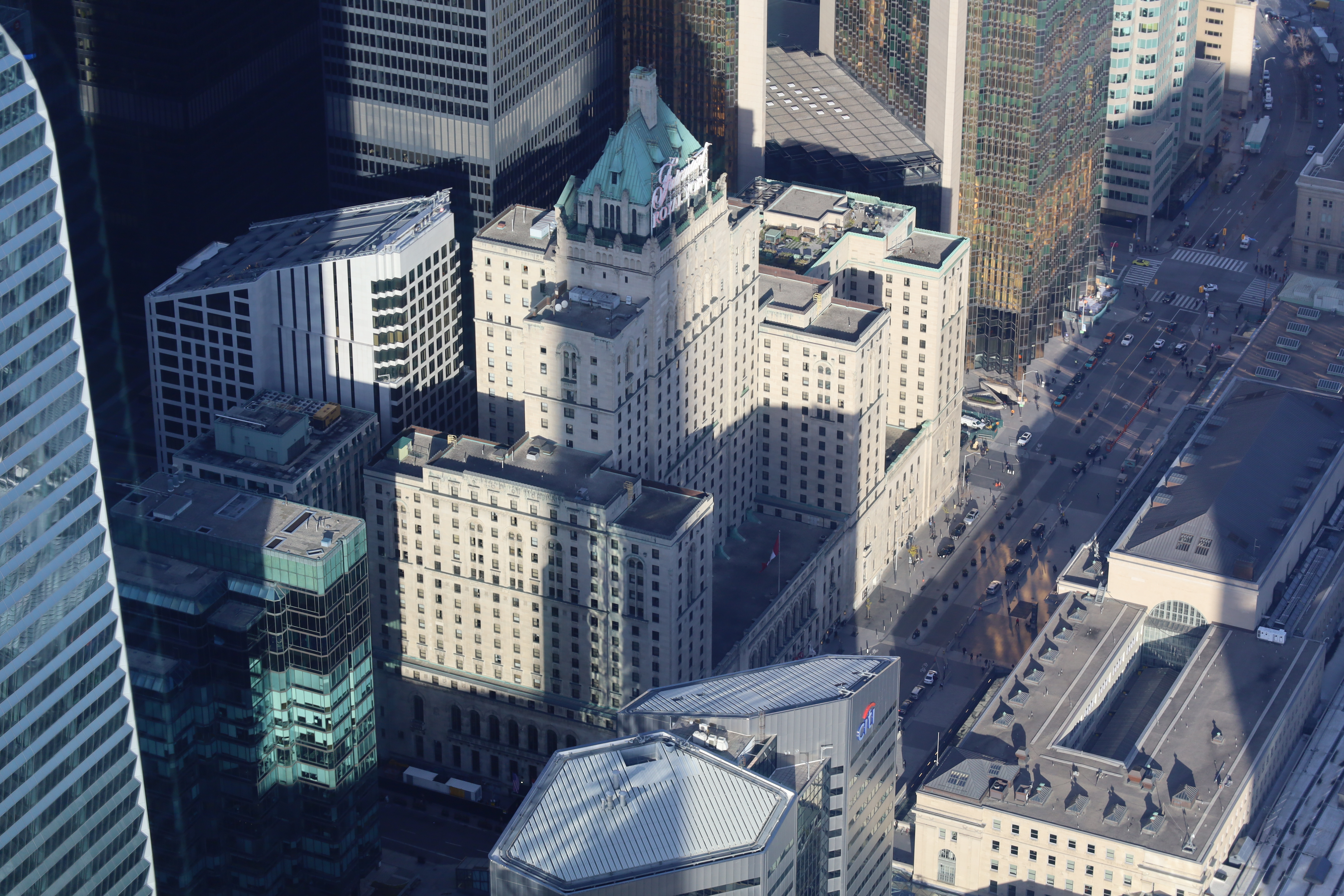
View from the CN Tower in 2023

Shortly after acquiring the property, Canadian Pacific Hotels, a division of the Canadian Pacific Railway, announced its plan to demolish the Queen's Hotel to construct a new hotel. The building was designed by a Canadian architectural firm, Ross and Macdonald, in association with Sproatt and Rolph. Both firms had designed buildings for Canadian Pacific Hotels before the Royal York Hotel.

The building design went through several drafts before its final draft, "H plan," was adopted. The plan saw the development of a towering central element, to distinguish itself from the buildings of the nearby Eaton's Annex. The building's towering design also enabled most rooms and public spaces to face either the downtown core of the city or the Toronto waterfront and Lake Ontario. Completed in 1929, the Châteauesque-styled hotel includes a row of pointed arches on the third story and a small peaked roof with tiny dormers at the top of the pitched roof. In addition, grotesques shaped as griffins are present at various corners of the hotel. The building's exterior is made of Indiana Limestone, which encases the hotel's 28-story steel frame.

Along with traditional features found in most Chateauesque-styled hotels, the building also incorporated an Art Deco setback and Romanesque-inspired decor. The balanced design of the building (before the addition of the east wing) was achieved through the application of semi-neoclassical motifs, and groups of arcaded windows. The interior of the building was largely created in an Edwardian architectural style. Its interior features a number of crystal chandeliers, and a hand-carved wood lobby ceiling.

The building stands 124-metre-tall (407 ft), containing 28 floors primarily made up of guest rooms and other hotel amenities. After the building's completion, it was briefly the tallest building in the British Empire, and Canada. The building would lose the record the following year, with the erection of the nearby Canadian Bank of Commerce Tower on King Street.

Work to enlarge the hotel commenced in 1957, and was completed in 1959. The new east wing expansion was designed by the architecture firm Ross, Patterson, Townsend, & Fish, in association with Charles B. Dolphin.

=== Facilities ===
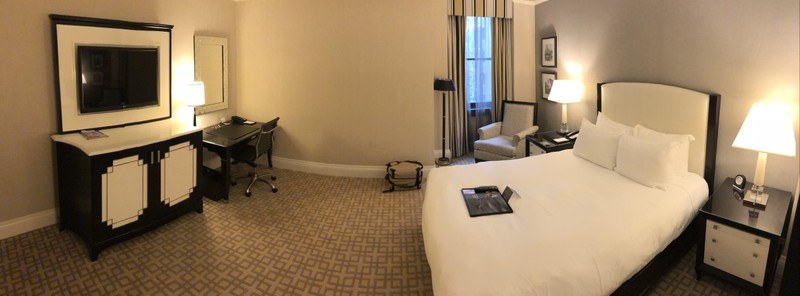
A guest room inside the hotel

When the Royal York first opened, the hotel included 1,048 guest rooms and suites. When the hotel first opened, it featured a telephone switchboard longer than 18 metres (60 ft). As of 2014, the hotel expanded the number of its guest rooms and suites to 1,363. Types of guest rooms include Signature or Luxury, along with an array of eight types of suites.

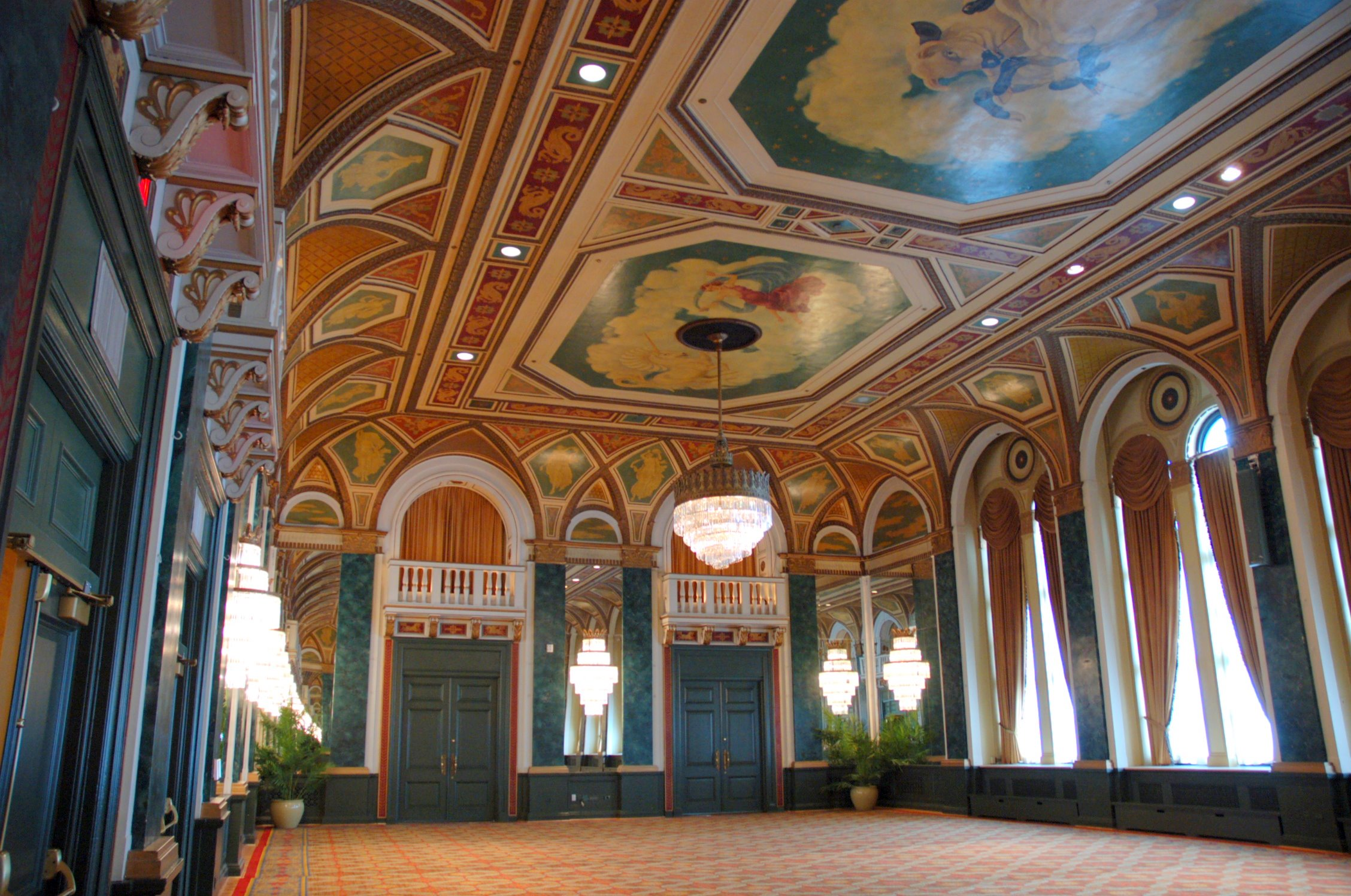
The Ballroom is an event space in the hotel with an oil-painted ceiling.

In addition to lodgings, the hotel has several event spaces. The hotel features an entire floor of function rooms, primarily used for conferences. A notable room at the hotel includes the Ballroom, which features an oil-painted ceiling from the hotel's opening. The Concert Hall is another event space at the hotel that is outfitted with a Casavant Frères pipe organ. With five manuals and one-hundred-and-seven stops, it was the largest pipe organ in Canada. Another notable event space within the hotel is the Imperial Room, which was once used as a nightclub from the 1940s to the 1990s. The space featured a stage at the north end of the room, a sunken floor with tables and a dance floor in the middle, and raised booths at the other end of the room. The room is presently used as a meeting and event space, most often by the Empire Club of Canada.

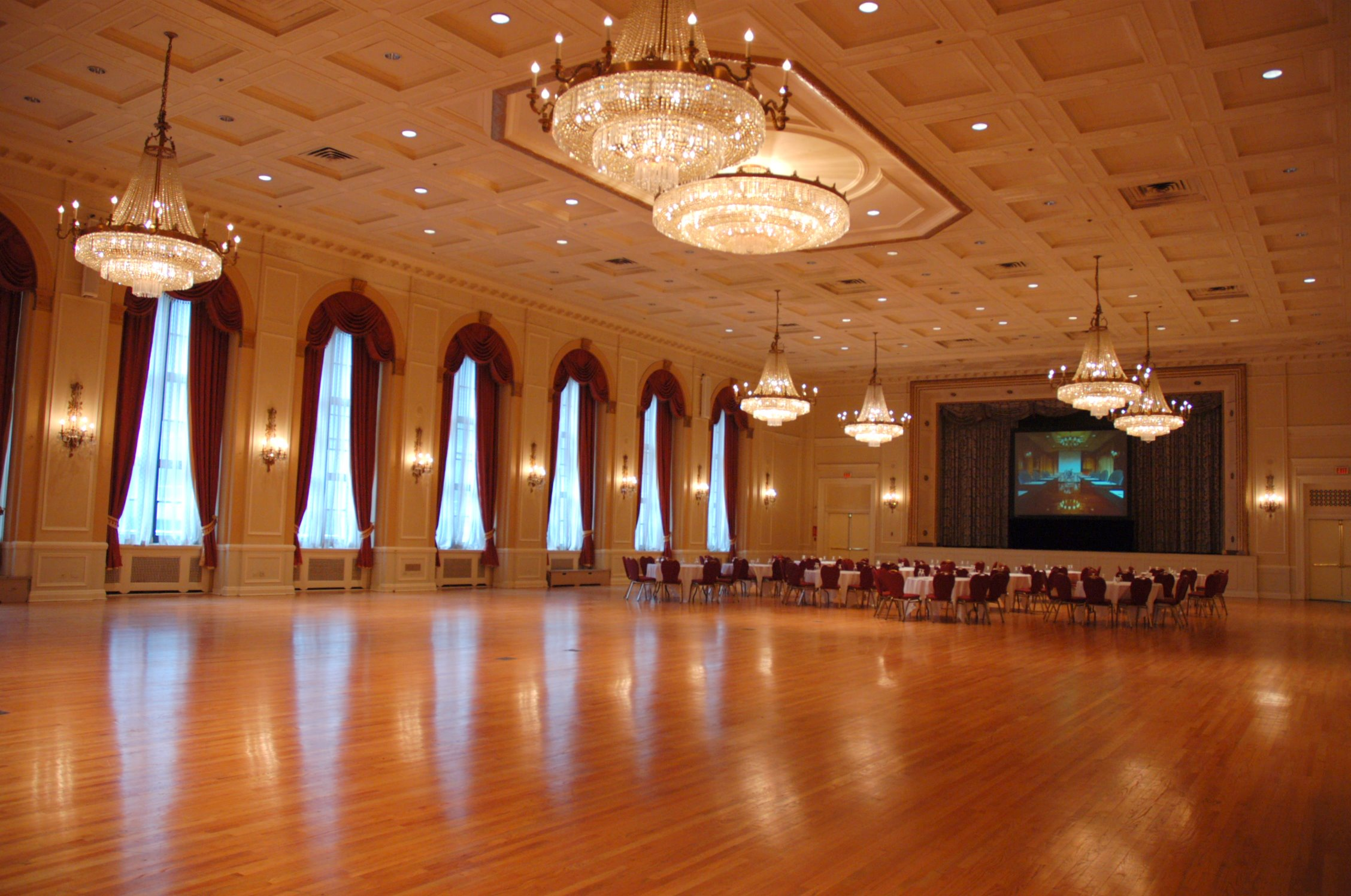
The Concert Hall is one of several event spaces at the Royal York Hotel.

A number of rooms at the Royal York are also occupied by restaurants and other food-based services. The Royal York's kitchen was Canada's largest hotel kitchen when the Royal York first opened, capable of producing over 15,000 French bread rolls a day. Restaurants located within the hotel include Benihana Japanese Steakhouse, and the Library Bar, the latter also offering afternoon tea. The fourteenth floor of the Royal York houses the hotel's roof herb garden, which provides the hotel's restaurants with fresh honey, herbs, vegetable, and flowers. The roof garden was opened at the hotel on 12 June 1929. In June 2008, the hotel installed three beehives on its fourteenth floor to serve as an in-house garden for its restaurants. The apiary presently has six beehives, and a pollinator bee hotel, installed in 2014. Approximately 350,000 honey bees reside at the apiary during the summer, with the six beehives producing 205 kilograms (450 lb) of honey a year.

The hotel also operates a health club, which offers a number of amenities including an indoor pool with a skylight, a fitness centre, a whirlpool, a sauna, and steam rooms.

In 1929, a tunnel was built under Front Street West, in order to provide guests of the hotel with direct access to Union Station. The tunnel connecting the hotel to Union Station was later connected with the larger PATH underground city, a series of tunnels that connects various buildings in Downtown Toronto. In 1987, the city adopted the role of the coordinating agency for the tunnel network.

== History ==
The Royal York Hotel was not the first hotel built on the property, with the first hotel being built in 1843, known originally as the Ontario Terrace. After the original hotel was refurbished in 1853, the building was renamed the Sword's Hotel, and then the Revere Hotel after a change in ownership in 1860. Thomas Dick bought the hotel back in 1862, renovated it again, and named it Queen's Hotel. In 1874, the Queen's Hotel was purchased by Thomas McGaw and Henry Winnett, hoteliers of Upper Canada, who also owned the Queen's Royal Hotel in Niagara on the Lake, but when McGaw died, Winnett purchased the partnership from his estate in 1919 and in 1920 formed a limited liability company of which he was president, also later acquiring McGaw's interests in their hotels. The Queen's Hotel was billed as "One of the largest and most comfortable hotels in the Dominion of Canada."

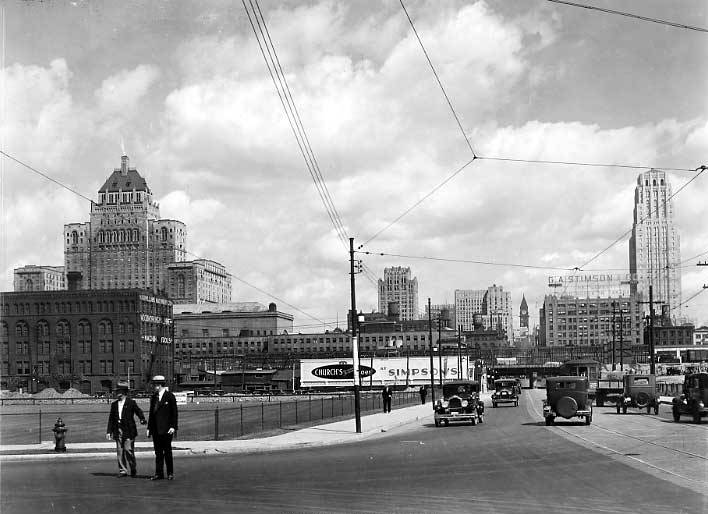
View of the Royal York Hotel (left) in 1930, a year after its official opening.

After Winnett's death in 1925, his estate sold the Queen's Hotel to the Canadian Pacific Railway (CPR), run by then-president Sir Edward Wentworth Beatty. Later, Canadian Pacific announced its intention to demolish the Queen's Hotel to build the largest hotel in the British Commonwealth on its site.

Construction on the new hotel began in 1927 and was completed in 1929. Named the Royal York, the new hotel cost $16 million when built. The completed hotel featured over 1,000 guest rooms, each equipped with radios, private showers, and bathtubs, a library, a 12-bed hospital, and a 20.1-metre-tall (66 ft) telephone switchboard. The hotel also operated St. George's Golf and Country Club as the Royal York Golf Club from 1930 to 1946, when the hotel's parent company, Canadian Pacific Railway, divested itself from the golf course property.

The building was officially opened on 11 June 1929 by the Viscount Willingdon, the Governor General of Canada, in "one of the most glittering social events in Toronto's history." The Toronto Board of Trade hosted a luncheon in the hotel's banquet hall for E.W. Beatty and the board of directors of the Canadian Pacific Railway. After the luncheon, the Governor-General registered as the first guest of the hotel. During the afternoon, guides showed guests around the hotel. The day finished off with an opening ball at 9 PM (with over 2300 people attending). Several politicians and other notable people from the US and Canada attended the opening of the hotel. The opening of the hotel was front-page news in the Montreal Gazette on 12 June 1929. The hotel had 1,840 square metres (19,800 sq ft) of Canadian linoleum flooring upon opening.

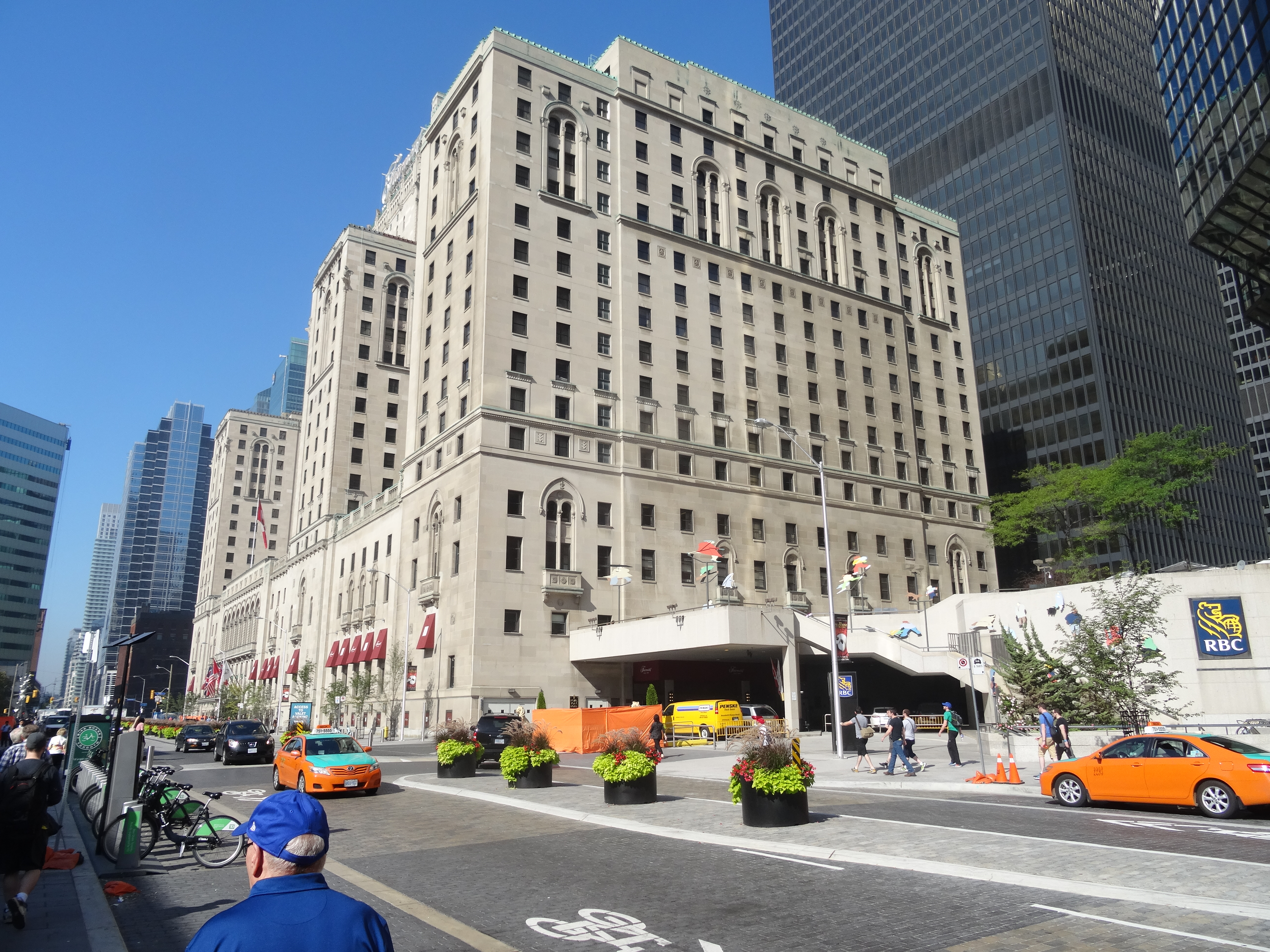
The east wing of the Royal York was completed in 1959.

From 1930 to 1935, a radio station operated from the hotel. Its call letters were CPRY (for "Canadian Pacific Royal York"). Broadcasting from the Imperial Room, CPRY programs were heard across the country. On 7 September 1949, the lobby of the hotel was converted into a temporary field hospital following a fire on the cruise ship SS Noronic. Docked in the Toronto harbour, the disaster on the Noronic killed 118 people.

From the 1940s to the 1990s, the hotel operated a nightclub known as the Imperial Room. It attracted top musicians and performers to the hotel from the 1940s to the 1990s, including Anne Murray, Buddy Rich, Count Basie, Doug Henning, Duke Ellington, Eartha Kitt, Ella Fitzgerald, Louis Armstrong, Marlene Dietrich, Pearl Bailey, Peggy Lee, Liza Minnelli, Rich Little, Tina Turner, Tony Bennett, and Woody Herman. The Imperial Room was also where Jim Carrey made his comedic stage debut. The nightclub was later converted to an event space.

The Royal York became a centre of political controversy during the 1955 Toronto municipal election, when it was revealed that the incumbent mayor, Allan A. Lamport, had spent taxpayers' money maintaining a private suite at the hotel for private meetings and cocktail parties. Work to enlarge the hotel with a new east wing commenced in 1957 and was completed in 1959.

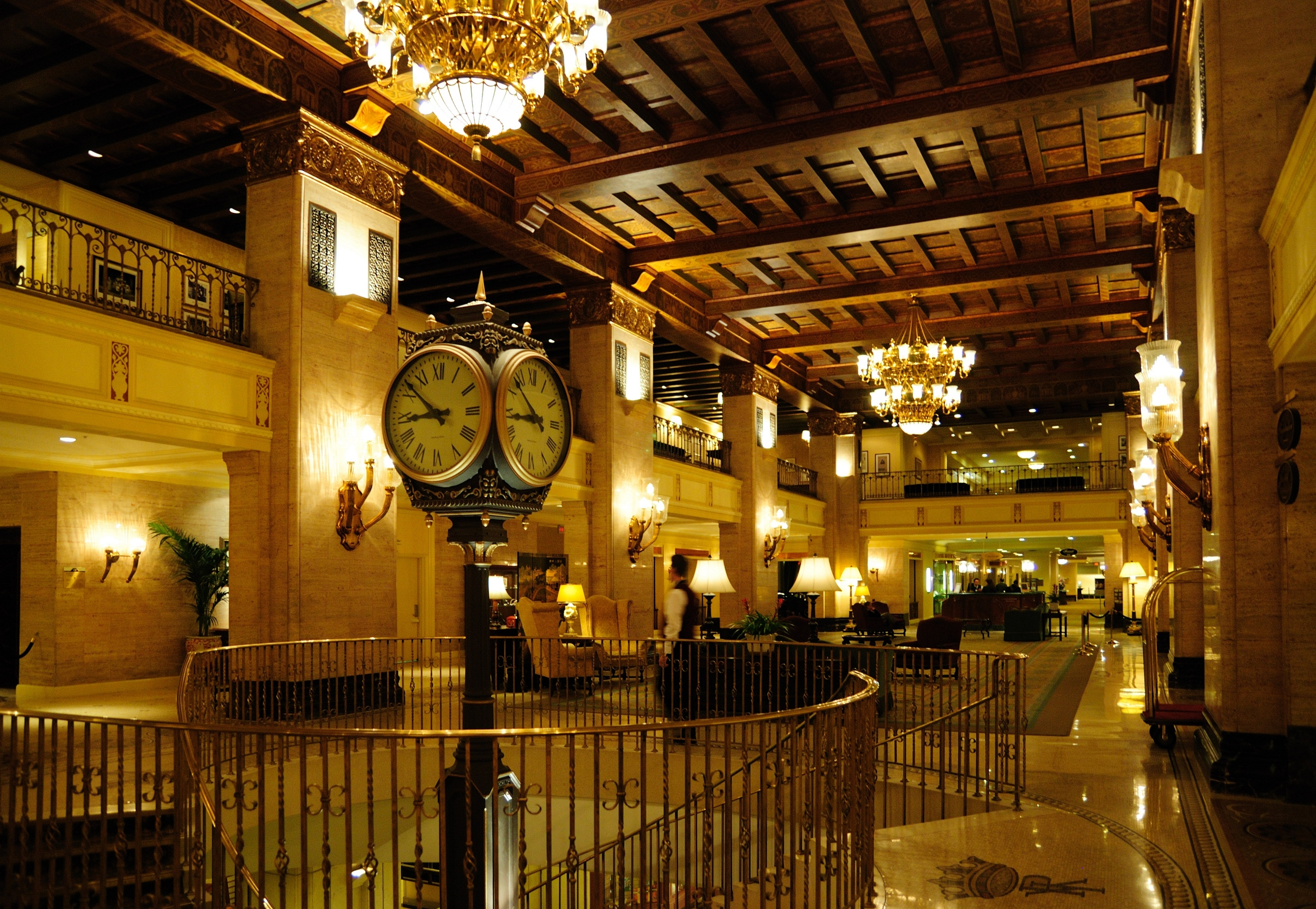
Renovations in 1972 and 1973 saw the addition of wood panels and a spiral staircase to hotel's lobby; the clock was donated by the royal family

The hotel underwent an extensive renovation program in 1972 and 1973 to modernize its image. Called the Royal York Revelation, the program was overseen by the architects Webb Zerafa Menkes Housden (who also designed the Royal Bank plaza next to the hotel). The renovation cut a hole in the main-floor lobby for a spiral staircase, covered the marble pillars in the lobby with wood panelling, hung modern wall lamps and a chandelier, and replaced rugs with carpet. The clock standing at the centre of the spiral staircase was donated by the Canadian royal family. From 1988 until 1993, the Royal York underwent a $100-million restoration.

In 2001, the company which owns the hotel, Canadian Pacific Hotels, was reorganized into Fairmont Hotels and Resorts, adopting the name of the American company it had purchased in 1999. As a result of the company's re-brand, the Royal York was renamed the "Fairmont Royal York." In 2007 the Royal York, along with a number of other Fairmont properties, were sold to Ivanhoé Cambridge, although Fairmont continues to manage the hotel.

The official welcome and reception for the leaders of the 2010 G20 Toronto summit was held at the Royal York Hotel on 26 June 2010. Due to its usage, the hotel was included in the Royal Canadian Mounted Police's designated security zones for the G20 summit. The hotel was used as a filming location for Red in 2010, standing in for a Chicago venue as well as for the 2012 film Red Lights.

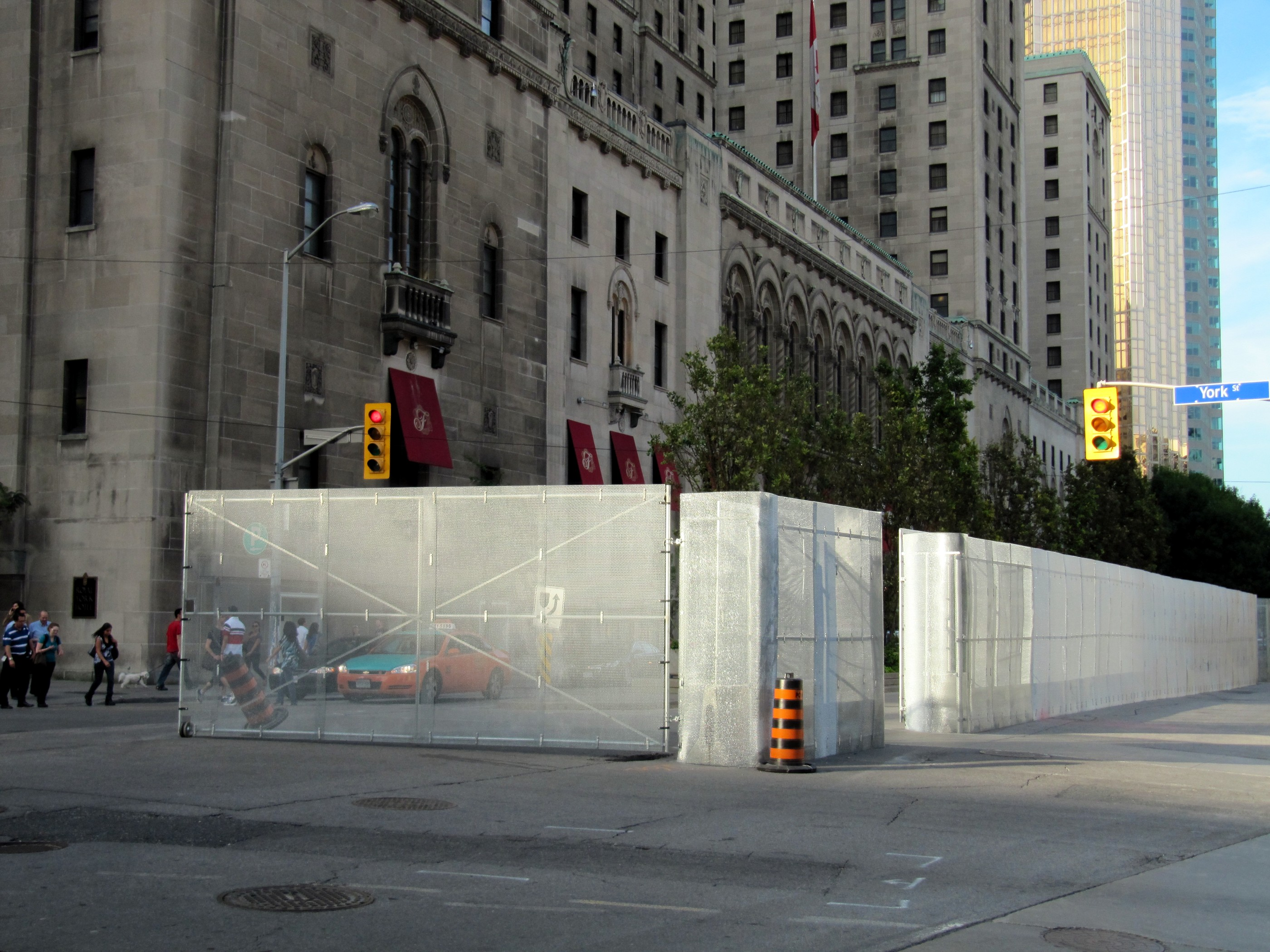
Security fence erected for the 2010 G20 Toronto summit. The hotel housed many of the 2010 G20 dignitaries.

On 28 October 2014, it was announced the hotel's ownership was reorganized. In a joint venture, KingSett Capital Inc. and InnVest Real Estate purchased 80 percent of the Royal York property from Ivanhoé Cambridge in 2014. As the venture's managing partner KingSett acquired a 60 percent share of the Royal York property, whereas InnVest acquired a 20 percent share of the property. Ivanhoé Cambridge maintained a 20 percent stake in the property's ownership. Following the sale of the hotel, its new owners announced a C$50-million renovation of the hotel.

== Notable guests ==
Several notable guests have stayed at the Royal York. The hotel frequently serves as a three-to-four-month home for members of the film industry or newcomers to the adjacent financial core. The Royal York is also used as a host hotel for the Toronto International Film Festival, making it a popular residence during the film festival. Celebrity guests who have visited the hotel include Andrew Lloyd Webber, Ashley and Mary Kate Olsen, Jennifer Aniston, Jennifer Garner, Justin Bieber, Leonardo DiCaprio, Matt Damon, and Susan Sarandon. The hotel keeps records of its guests' preferences in order to best accommodate them. Employees of the hotel are forbidden from carrying cell phones, tweeting or sharing information on social media about the guests at the hotel.

A number of heads of state, diplomats, and other foreign dignitaries have also stayed at the Royal York. During the 2010 G20 Toronto summit, the hotel housed eleven heads of state and heads of government. Heads of state that have stayed at the hotel include Nicolas Sarkozy, the President of France, and Ronald Reagan, the President of the United States. Other foreign dignitaries that have stayed at the Royal York include American Senator Robert F. Kennedy, and the 14th Dalai Lama.

=== Royal family ===
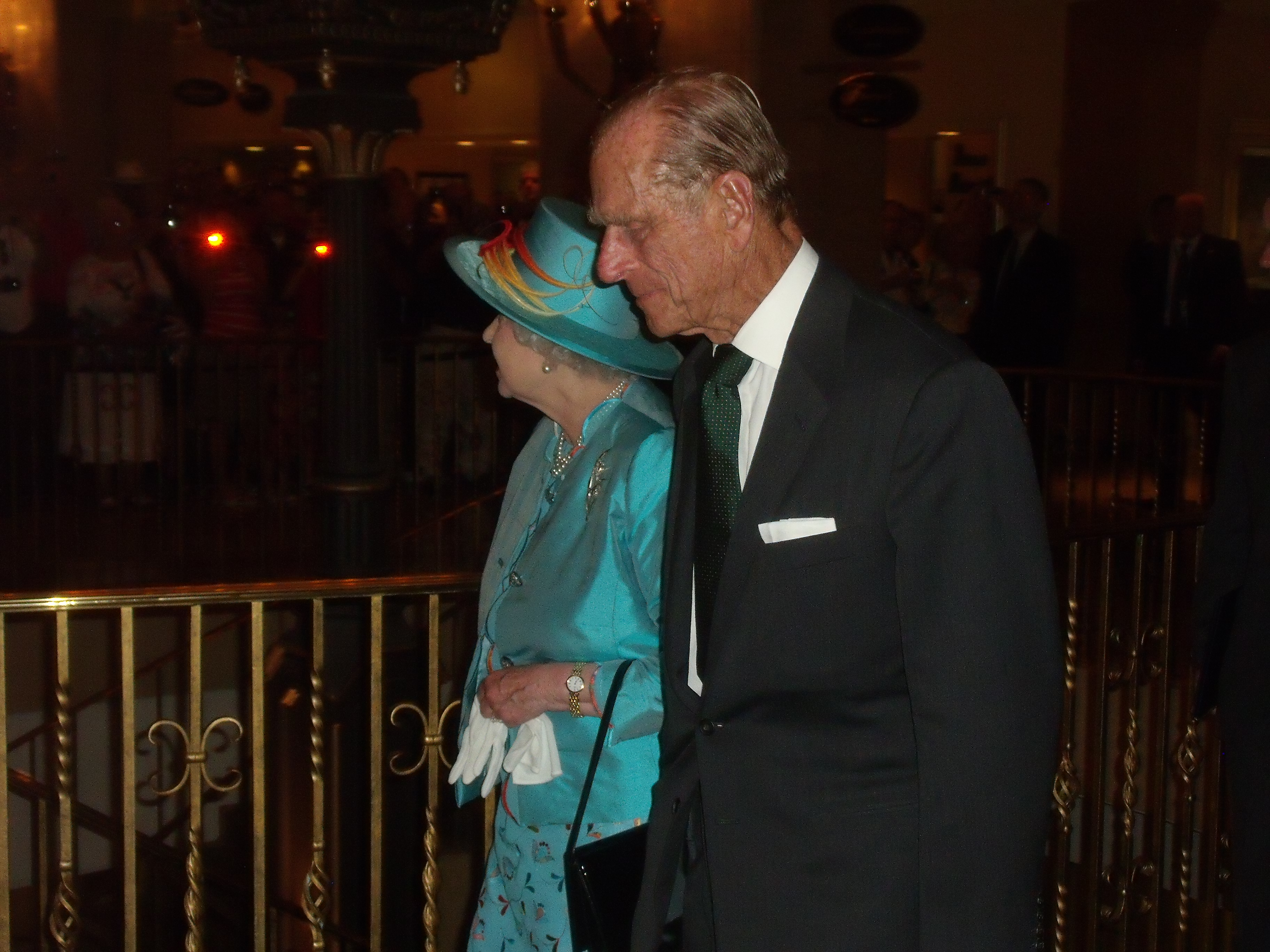
Queen Elizabeth II and Prince Philip, Duke of Edinburgh, at the Royal York during their 2010 royal tour

As Ontario does not have a government house, the Royal York was the residence of choice for Queen Elizabeth II and other members of the Canadian royal family when in Toronto. Elizabeth first visited the Royal York Hotel during her 1951 royal tour of the country, accompanied by the Duke of Edinburgh. The first members of the royal family to visit the hotel were King George VI and Queen Elizabeth, during their 1939 royal tour of Canada. Other members of the royal family that have visited the Royal York include Andrew Mountbatten-Windsor; Prince Charles and Camilla, Duchess of Cornwall; and Prince Harry, Duke of Sussex, and Meghan, Duchess of Sussex.

The Queen usually had an entire floor reserved for her and her entourage, occupying the Royal Suite herself. The floors above and below the Royal Suite are vacated two weeks prior to the Queen's arrival and remain that way until her departure. The hotel includes amenities and furnishings reserved exclusively for the royal family, including a private elevator to the Royal Suite. Furniture and hardware reserved for the royal family, including mattresses and toilets, are placed in storage when not in use.

== See also ==
- Architecture in Canada
- Hotels in Toronto
- Monarchy in Ontario
- List of tallest buildings in Canada
- List of tallest buildings in Toronto
