= Toronto Union Station (1858) =

Railway station in Toronto, Ontario, Canada

Coordinates: 43°38′41″N 79°23′1″W

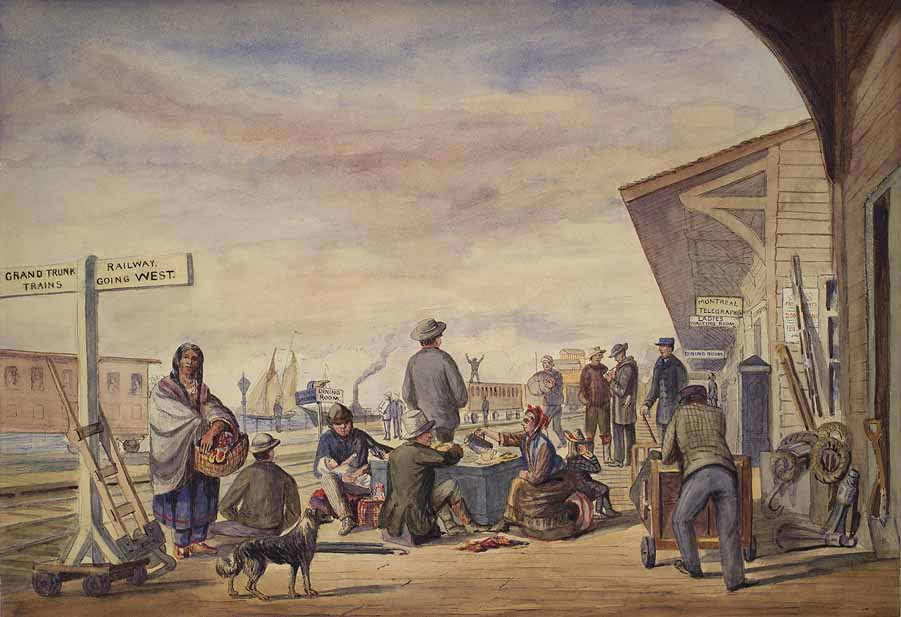
Armstrong's 1859 painting of the first Union Station

Toronto’s first Union Station was a passenger rail station located west of York Street at Station Street, south of Front Street in downtown Toronto. It was built by the Grand Trunk Railway (GTR) and opened in 1858.

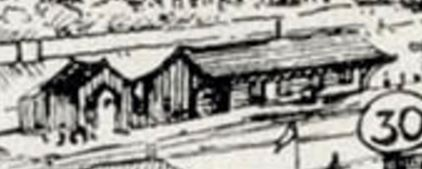
Union Station as seen from Toronto harbour in 1867

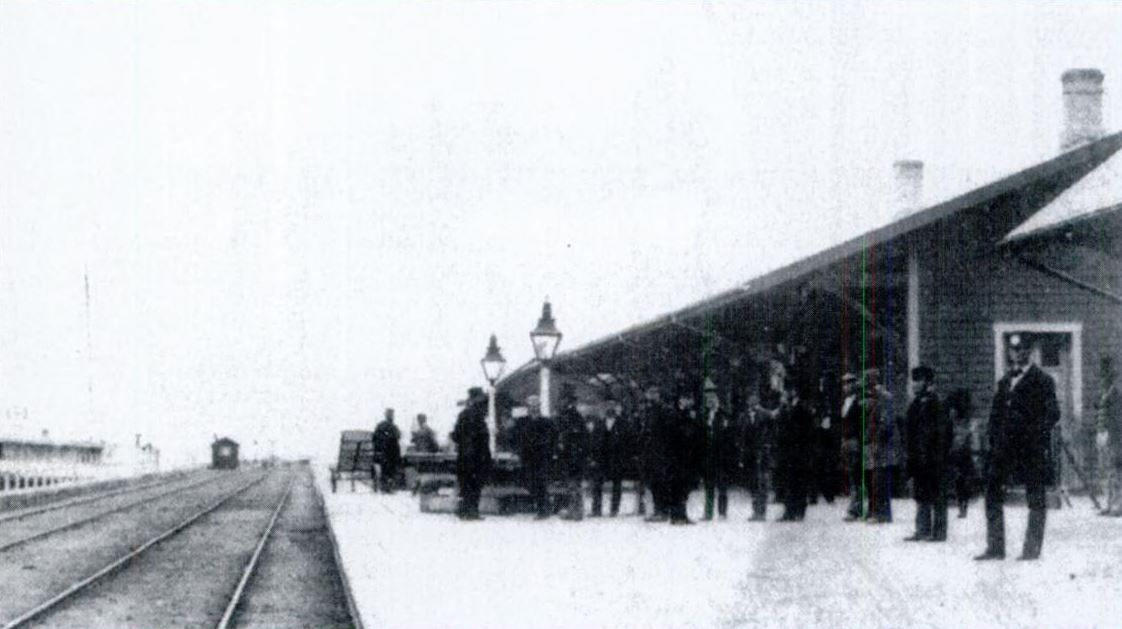
View of first Toronto Union Station, circa 1860s

== History ==
Railways arrived in Toronto in 1853, when the first passenger train left Toronto from a wooden depot located near Bay and Front Streets. This was the line of the Ontario, Simcoe & Huron Railway. This was followed in 1855 by Great Western Railways (GWR), which connected Toronto to the west along the waterfront, from a station at the Queen's Wharf. The Grand Trunk Railway completed its Montreal–Toronto mainline one year later. The three railways now converged at the Toronto waterfront, a narrow strip of land south of Front Street. They were forced to share the limited real estate available.

As a consequence, the Grand Trunk Railway (GTR) built the first union station in Toronto in 1858 at a location just west of the present Union Station train shed. The location was landfill, south-west of Front and York Streets, then the intersection of York Street and The Esplanade along the water. The station consisted of three wooden structures and was initially shared with the Northern Railway of Canada (as the Ontario, Simcoe & Huron was renamed) and the Great Western Railway, although both railways had already built their own stations along the Toronto waterfront. It was Canada's first union station.

It opened on June 21, 1858, known simply as the "New Station". Three GTR trains departed daily to the east (to Montreal and Kingston) and two to the west (through Guelph, Berlin and Stratford).

In 1864, delegates from the Charlottetown and Quebec City conferences on the Canadian Confederation were welcomed at this station by a huge crowd which then escorted the delegates to the Queen's Hotel on Front Street. In 1866, the Great Western opened its own station at Yonge Street. It was the first station in Toronto to provide a covered train shed. In 1867, the Northern opened its City Hall station at Jarvis Street.

By the 1870s, the 1858 station was inadequate. The station was demolished in 1871 and a temporary station was used while the Grand Trunk built a much larger, second Union Station at the same location, opening in 1873. The other railways continued to use their own stations but stopped at the Union Station as a courtesy to passengers.

The location of the railway station is now buried under the 17 feet (5.2 m)-high railway viaduct on the western approach to the current Union Station.

== Bibliography ==
- Boles, Derek (2009). Toronto's Railway Heritage. Arcadia Publishing. ISBN 978-0-7385-6570-5.
