= Ritz-Carlton Toronto =

Luxury hotel in Toronto

The Ritz-Carlton, Toronto
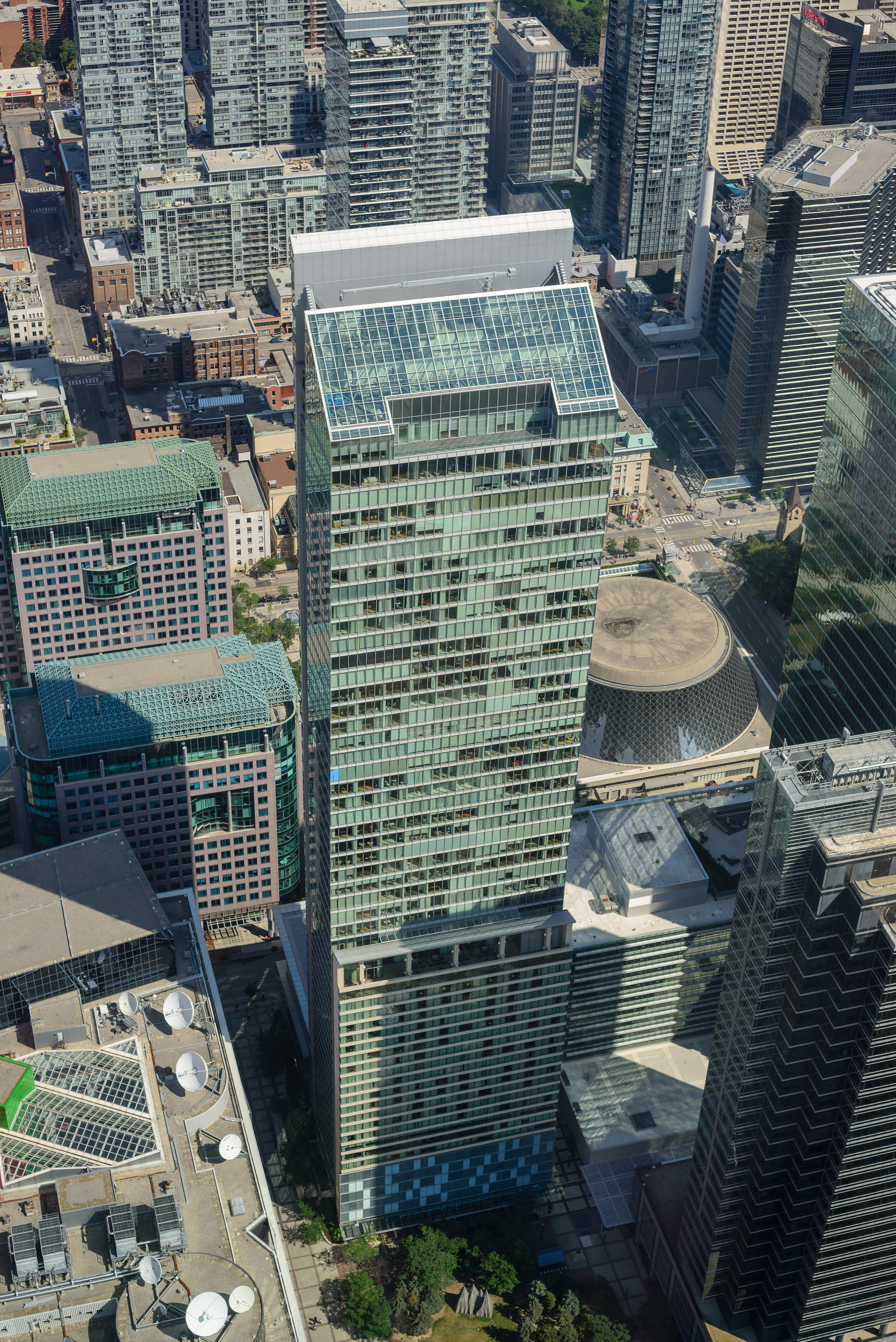
- View of the building from the CN Tower in 2017
- Interactive map of the The Ritz-Carlton, Toronto area

General information
- Type: Hotel and residential
- Architectural style: Neomodern
- Location: 181 Wellington Street West; Toronto, Ontario
- Coordinates: 43.645°N 79.387°W
- Construction started: 2007
- Completed: 2011
- Cost: $300 million
- Owner: Ontario Teachers' Pension Plan
- Operator: The Ritz-Carlton Hotel Company

Height
- Roof: 209.8 m (688 ft)

Technical details
- Floor count: 53 (plus 6 below ground)
- Floor area: 65,030 m^{2} (700,000 sq ft)
- Lifts/elevators: 19

Design and construction
- Architects: Kohn Pedersen Fox; Page and Steele
- Developer: Graywood Developments; Cadillac Fairview; The Ritz-Carlton Hotel Company
- Main contractor: EllisDon Construction Services Inc.

Other information
- Number of units: 151 units 267 suites

The Ritz-Carlton, Toronto is a luxury hotel and residential condominium building in Toronto, Ontario, Canada. At 209.8 metres (688 ft), it is one of the tallest buildings in Toronto. It is located at 181 Wellington Street West, on the western edge of the downtown core and bordering Toronto's entertainment district. The hotel opened on February 16, 2011.

== Architecture ==
The 53-storey tower is approximately 210 metres (690 ft) with a total floor area of 65,030 square metres (700,000 sq ft). The exterior consists of an outwardly sloped neomodern glass facade, giving it a distinctive profile on Toronto's skyline. The interior includes 263 hotel rooms as well as 159 Ritz-Carlton managed condominiums. The hotel occupies the lower 20 floors; floors 21 and 22 are used for condominium amenities and some residences, while floors 23 to 52 hold the remaining condominium residences. The penthouse suite occupies the entire 52nd floor, while the 53rd floor houses building mechanical equipment. The skyscraper includes a 2,100-square-metre (23,000 sq ft) spa.

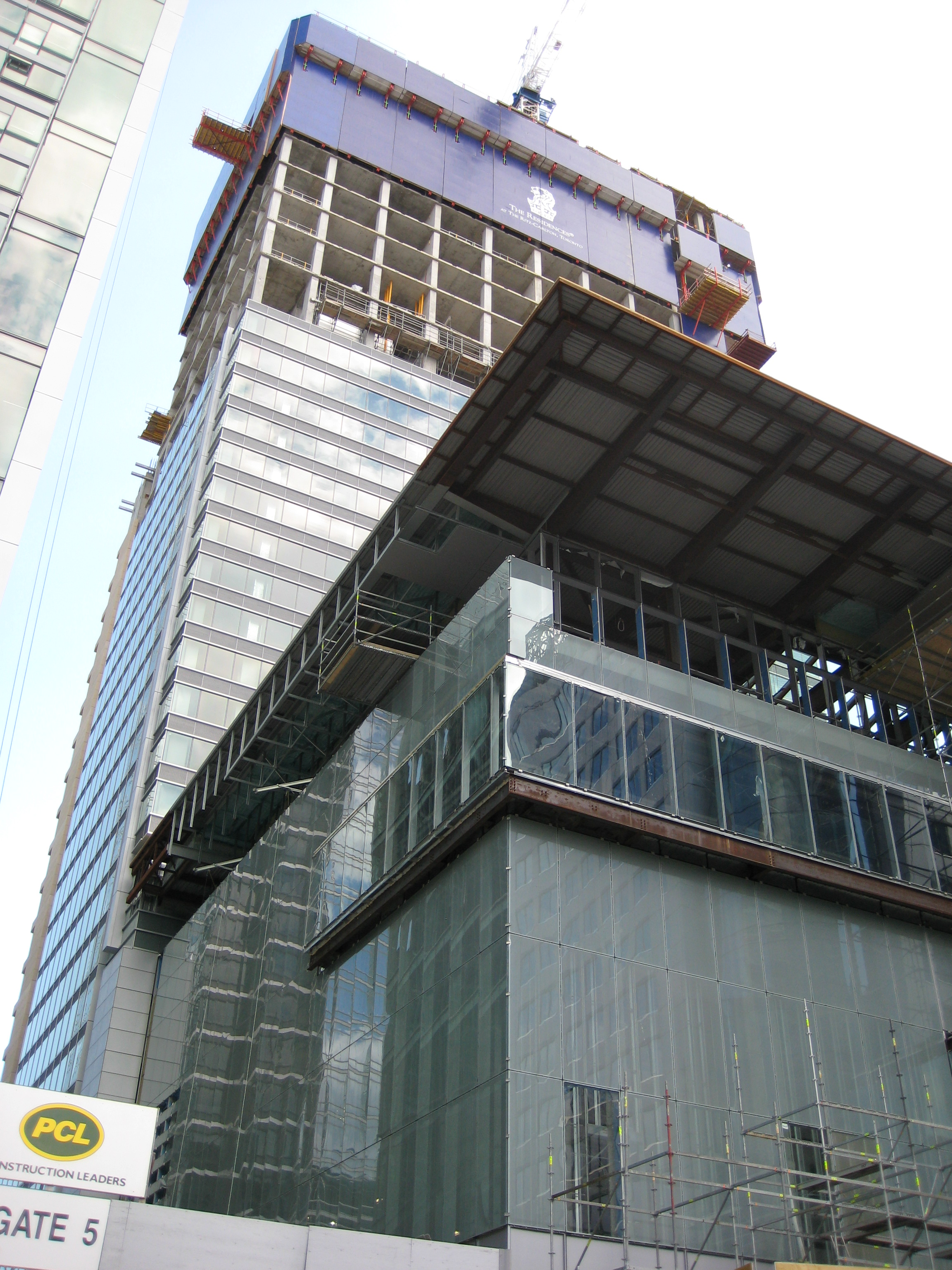
The building under construction in June 2009

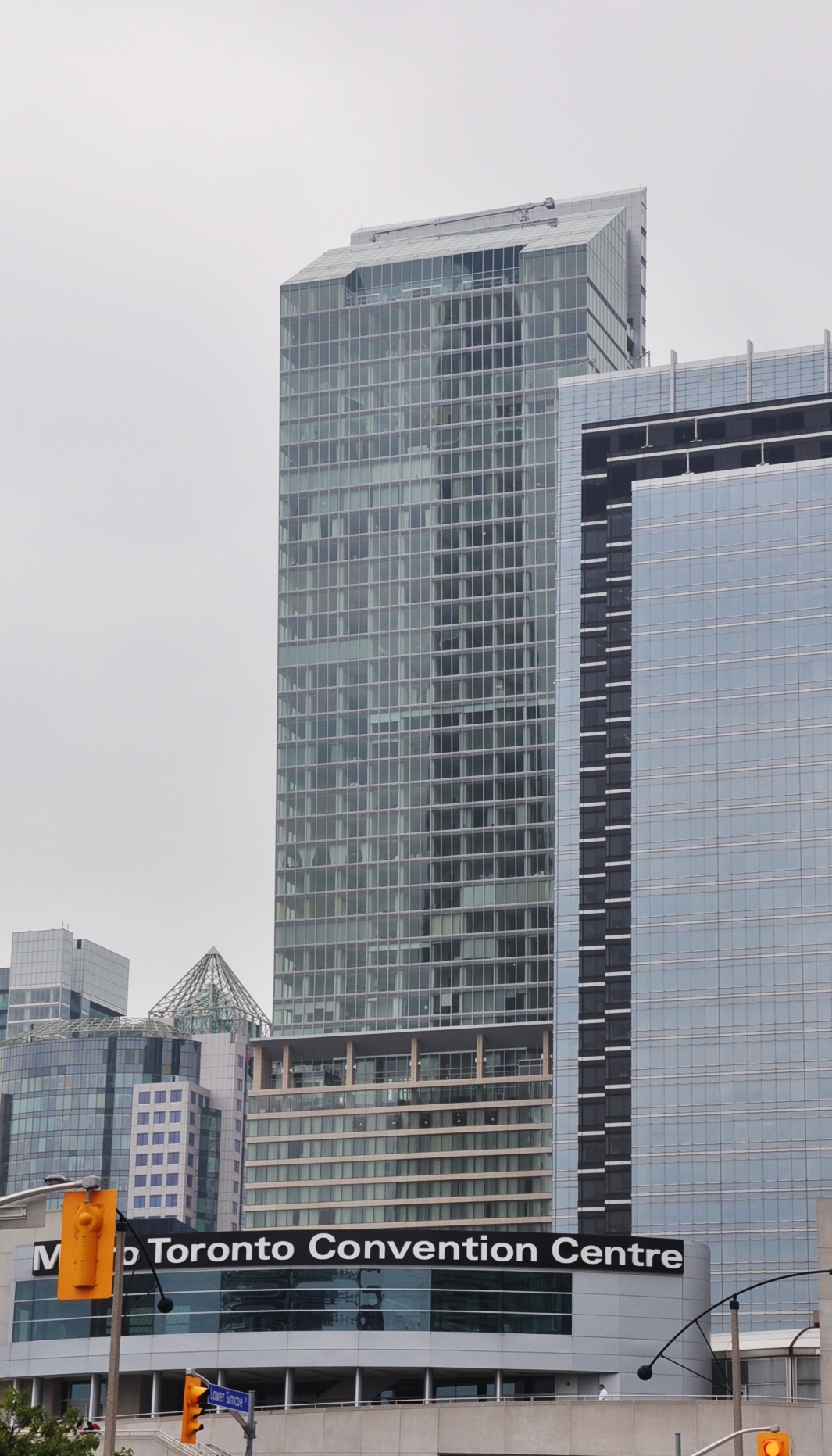
South facade of the tower in September 2011

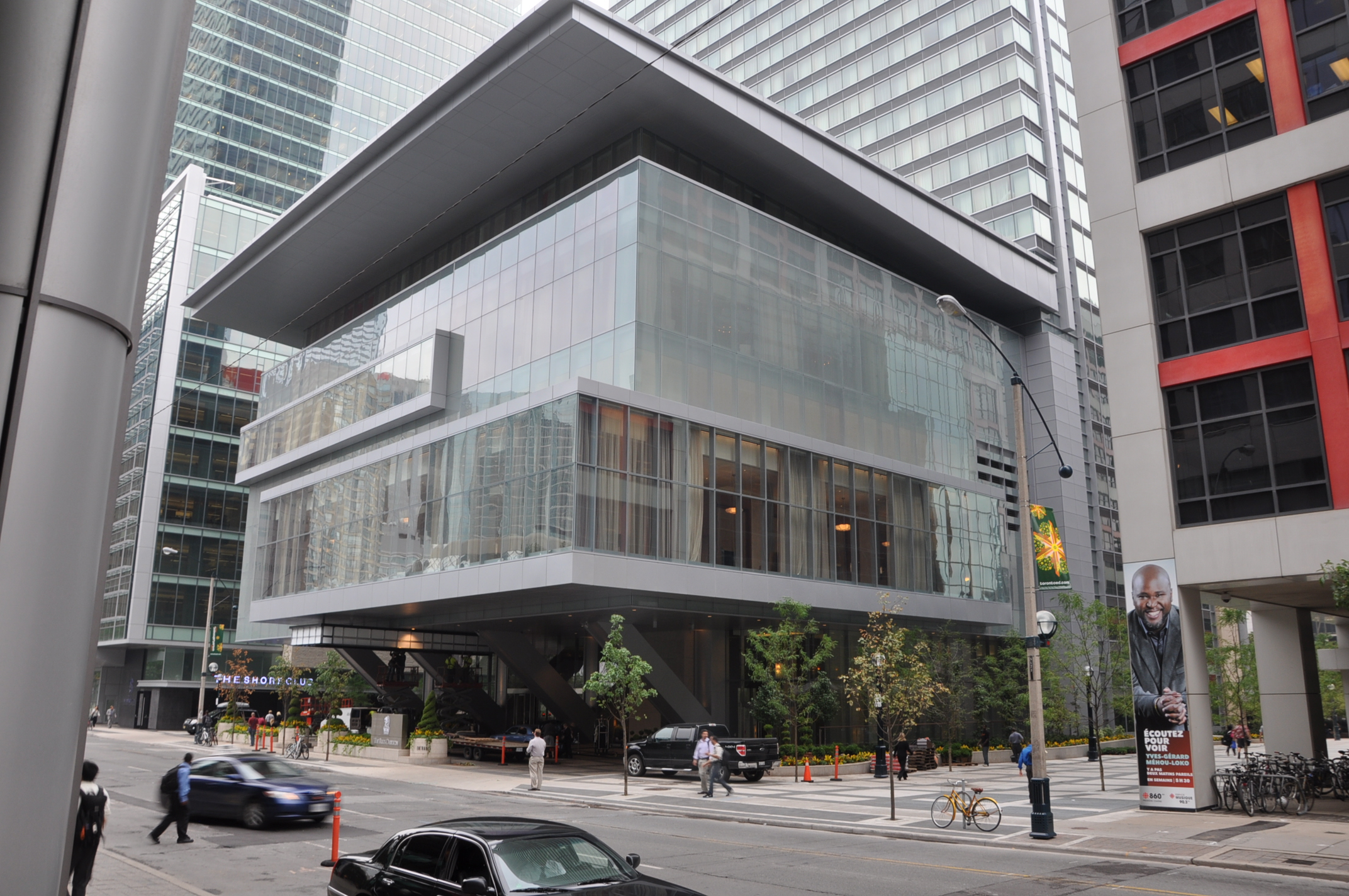
The front entrance on Wellington Street

== See also ==
- List of tallest buildings in Toronto
- List of tallest buildings in Canada
- Ritz-Carlton Hotels
