= Union Hotel (Toronto) =

Toronto hotel

- Interactive map of the Union Hotel area
- Former names: Strathcona Hotel
- Alternative names: Union Hotel Toronto; Union Hotel, Toronto

General information
- Architectural style: Chicago School - Structure; Modernist - Façade
- Location: 60 York Street; Toronto, Ontario; M5J 1S8
- Coordinates: 43.6463°N 79.3831°W
- Opened: 1933
- Renovated: 2012, 2023–2025
- Owner: Silver Hotel Group

Height
- Height: 42 metres (137.8 ft)

Technical details
- Floor count: 12

Other information
- Number of rooms: 189
- Number of restaurants: 2 (Humble Donkey & Sahni)
- Public transit access: Subway at Union Station; UP Express at Union Station; GO Transit at Union Station; Via Rail at Union Station

Website
- unionhoteltoronto.com

Ontario Heritage Act
- Official name: Union Station Heritage Conservation District
- Designated: 27 July 2006

The Union Hotel is a boutique hotel located in Downtown Toronto, Ontario, Canada. It is located on the northern side of Toronto's Union Station, after which it is named. The hotel originally opened in 1933 as the Strathcona Hotel. The hotel underwent renovations in 2023 and reopened in 2025, adopting its present name.

== Hotel ==
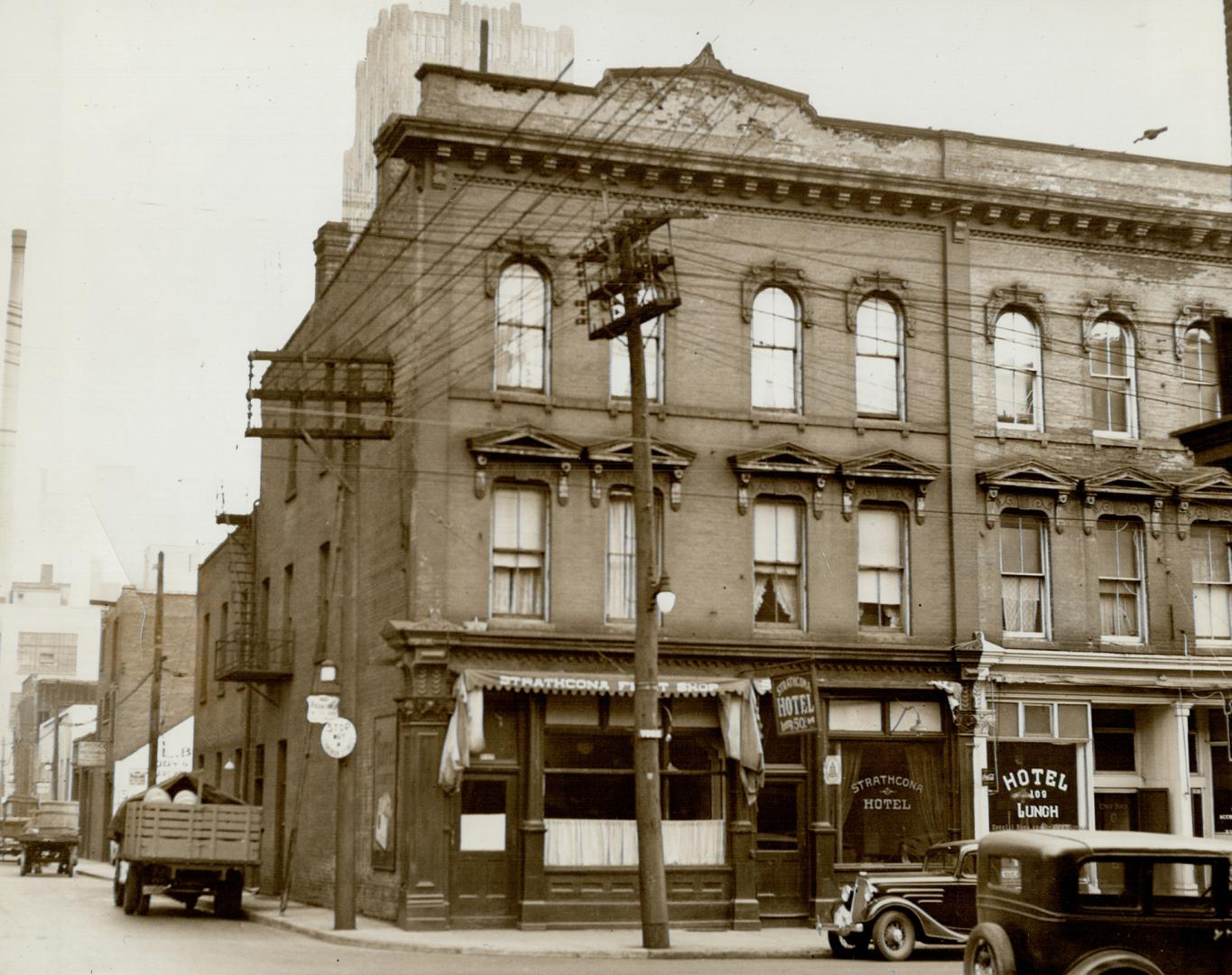
Strathcona Hotel at South east corner of York and Pearl

The hotel is at 60 York Street in the financial district of Toronto. Union Hotel is a 14-storey, 189-bedroom boutique hotel owned and managed by Silver Hotel Group. The hotel features a lobby lounge named Humble Donkey with plans to open a restaurant in the hotel's basement level in spring of 2025. The Union Hotel includes a fitness center, a courtyard, and a small meeting space called "The 6ix," all located on the second floor of the building.

== History ==
The hotel opened as the Strathcona Hotel in 1933. In 1935, the owner persistently pushed the municipal hotel inspector to permit dancing in the dining room. The inspector rejected this, but encouraged his supervisory board to consider permitting dancing in hotels.

The hotel briefly appeared in the film Suicide Squad (2016).

In April 2020, the hotel was leased by the City of Toronto for six months to provide temporary shelter for people experiencing homelessness. In October 2020, the lease was extended by another six months. The city paid the hotel $592,243 per month, representing $100 per room per night, totalling $7.5 million per year, plus the cost of providing food to residents. In June 2023, the temporary homeless shelter closed and underwent renovations.

In February 2025, the hotel reopened as Union Hotel.

== See also ==
- Hotels in Toronto
- Fairmont Royal York
- Hotel Victoria (Toronto)
- Union Station (Toronto)
