= Thomas Dick (hotelier) =

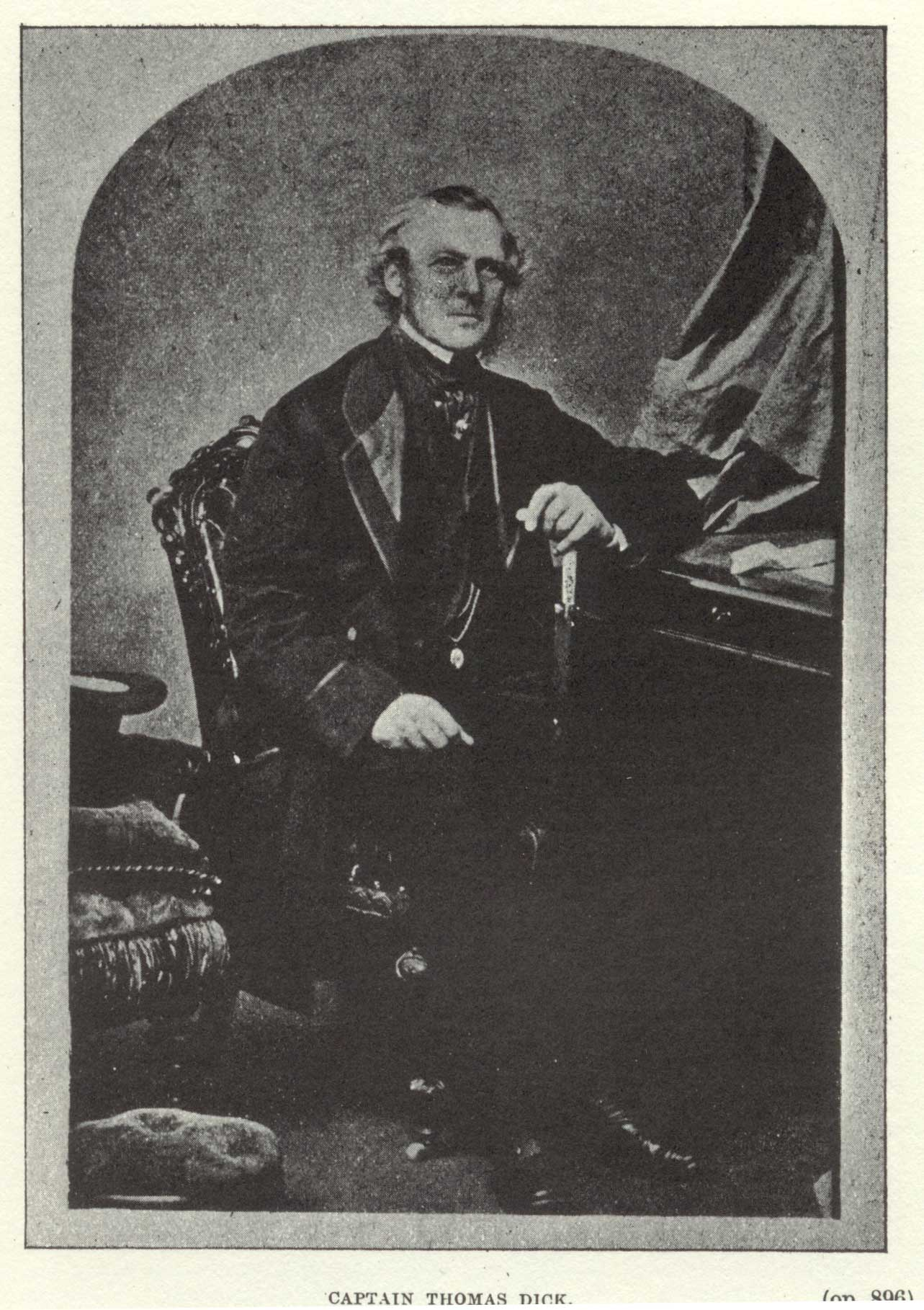
- Born: 1809-1810; Scotland
- Died: 1874 (aged 64–65); Toronto
- Occupations: Ship's captain, hotelier
- Known for: owner of the Queen's Hotel

Thomas Dick was a United Kingdom/Canada citizen, who worked as a sailor, a ship's captain, who later bought and operated Toronto's most luxurious hotel. Dick was born in 1809 or 1810, and went to sea at 14 years old, and had earned his master's certificate, and become a ship's captain, by the time he was 23. He and his wife immigrated to Canada in 1833 or 1834.

They first settled in Niagara-on-the-Lake, then a shipbuilding port. Dick seems to have played a role in the shipbuilding there. He commanded the schooner Fanny in 1835. He commanded HMS Experiment during the Battle of the Windmill in 1838.

Dick started being part owner of the ships he commanded, later owning a small fleet of ships.

However, by the 1850, railroads were starting to supplant water travel – at least along the shores of Lake Ontario. Dick moved his fleet to the Upper Lakes, and branched out into finance, real estate, and, eventually, running the Queen's Hotel, which he turned into one of Toronto's most luxurious hotels.
