= Queen's Hotel, Toronto =

Hotel in Toronto, Ontario

Coordinates: 43°38′47.1″N 79°22′52.3″W

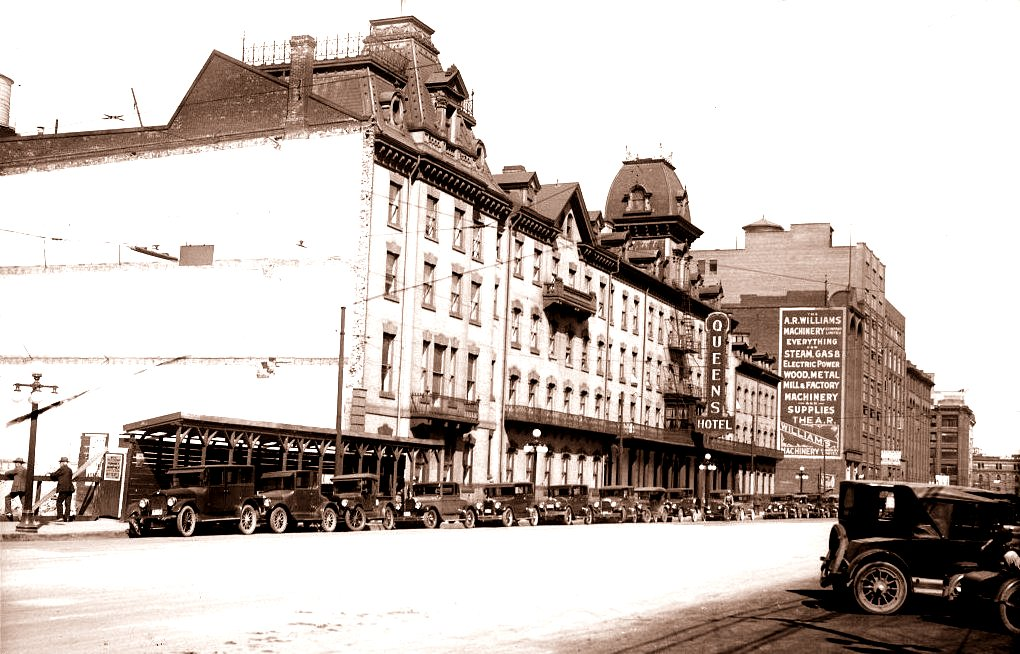

The Queen's Hotel was a large hotel, in Toronto, Ontario, Canada, located on the north side of Front Street, between Bay and York Street streets - the current site of the Royal York Hotel. In 1927 Canadian Pacific Railways acquired the Queen's Hotel, across the street from the newly opened Union Station, so it could demolish it, and build a larger hotel.

== History ==
In 1844 four rowhouses, designed by John Howard, were combined to form a hotel by Patrick Sword, which opened as "Sword's Hotel", in 1856. In 1860 the hotel was renamed the "Revere House". The hotel was purchased, and renovated, by Captain Thomas Dick, and renamed the "Queen's Hotel" in 1862. The hotel was considered luxurious, and hosted prominent guests, including the Prince of Wales.

During the American Civil War the hotel was very popular with Americans from the Confederacy. Some accounts assert Southerners had booked the entire hotel. The hotel served as an informal headquarters for Confederate Secret Service activities in neutral Canadian territory against the United States during the Civil War.

At its height it provided 210 rooms, a restaurant, and extensive gardens. It was the first hotel in Canada to have elevators installed.

== See also ==
- Royal eponyms in Canada
