= EllisDon =

Construction company

EllisDon Corporation
- Type: Private (employee-owned)
- Industry: Construction
- Founded: 1951
- Founders: Don Smith; David Ellis Smith
- Headquarters: Mississauga, Ontario, Canada
- Number of locations: 15 offices
- Area served: Global
- Key people: Geoff Smith, Executive Chairperson; Kieran Hawe, President and CEO
- Products: Construction services & technology
- Number of employees: 4500+
- Website: www.ellisdon.com

EllisDon is an employee-owned construction services company that was founded and incorporated in 1951 in London, Ontario, Canada, by brothers Don and David Ellis Smith. The company is headquartered in Mississauga, Ontario, Canada.

== History ==
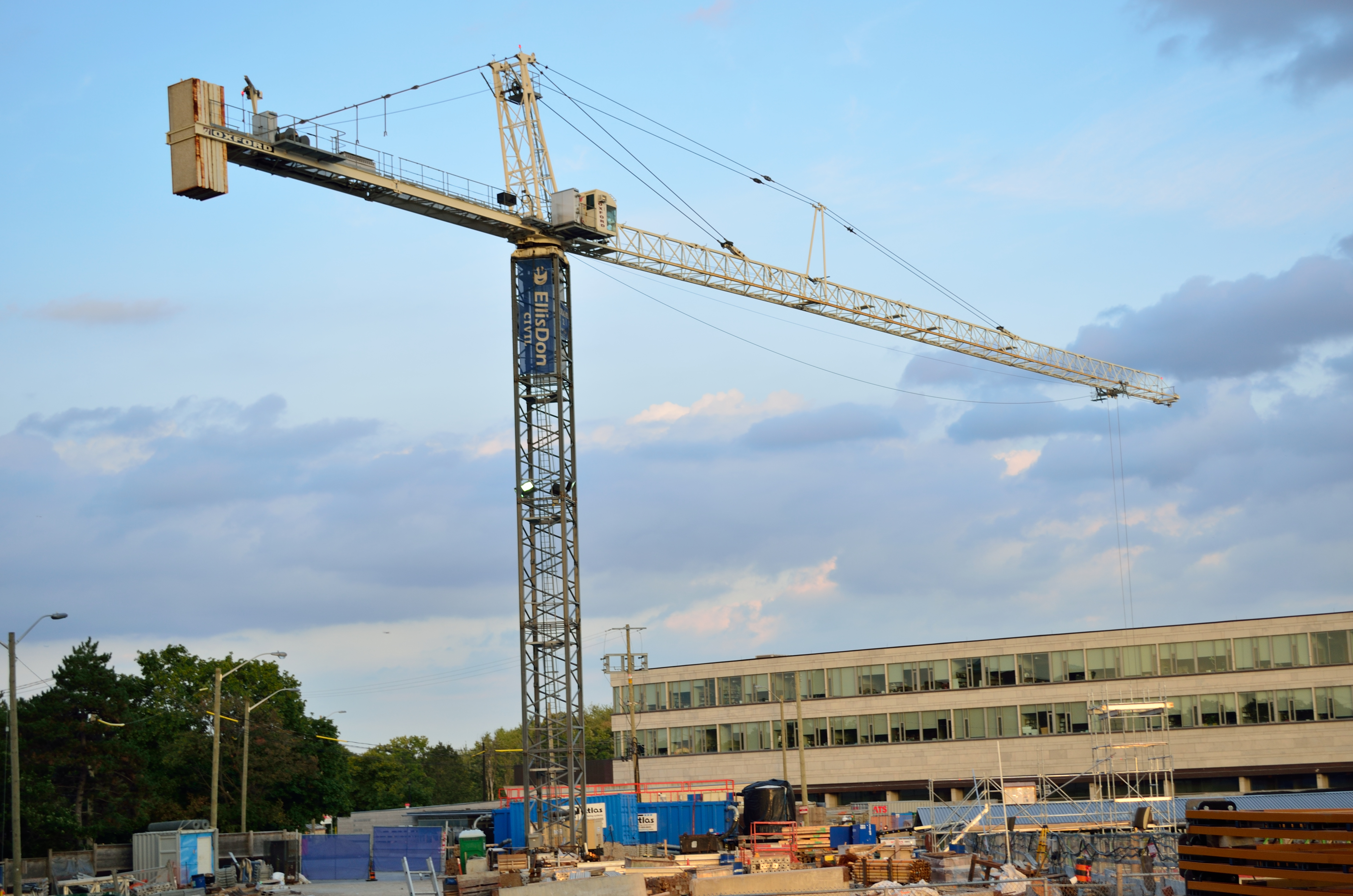
EllisDon construction crane at York University

=== Founding ===
In 1951, EllisDon was launched by brothers Don and David Ellis Smith as a local contractor in London, Ontario.

=== 1951–1989 ===
Between 1956 and 1968, EllisDon computerized its accounting and cost control systems, and operated a purchased tower crane – the first construction company in Canada to do both. In 1971, EllisDon launched a Corporate Safety Strategy to improve job site safety.

Between 1974 and 1976, the company expanded, establishing operations in Edmonton, Alberta and in Saudi Arabia. Since then EllisDon has expanded its current operations to its offices around the world.

Once EllisDon was awarded the Construction Management Contract for the Metro Toronto Convention Centre project in 1982, it moved on to build the SkyDome (renamed Rogers Centre in 2005). This project was completed in 1989, and was the world's first retractable rooftop stadium.

=== 1990–2003 ===
In 1990, EllisDon established the construction industry's first freestanding Research and Development Department. Following that, EllisDon in 1993 became the first Canadian company to build in Latvia and Lithuania following the removal of the Iron Curtain in the USSR. In 1997, EllisDon completed its first project in Malaysia.

In 1996, Don Smith's son, Geoff Smith – who joined the company as a full-time employee in 1982 – became EllisDon's president and CEO.

=== 2004–present ===
In 2004, EllisDon participated in a new hospital funding model, a public-private partnership (PPP) with the $450 million William Osler Health Centre in Brampton, Ontario.

EllisDon delivered Toronto's MaRS (Medical and Related Services) Convergence Centre (Building B) in 2005.

In 2008, EllisDon completed construction and installation work in the Dubai Waterfront, the largest waterfront development of its kind in the world.

In 2010, EllisDon completed Winnipeg International Airport Terminal Building, Canada's first LEED (Leadership in Energy and Environmental Design) certified airport terminal.

In June 2016, EllisDon launched The Carbon Impact Initiative Action Plan in support of Canada's international climate change commitments. Industry executives, in collaboration with government leaders, established the initiative outlining strategies to transform the market toward a low-carbon economy. Mohawk College's Joyce Centre for Partnership and Innovation Building is Ontario's first net-zero institutional building as well as the first pilot project under the Carbon Impact Initiative.

In March 2018, EllisDon acquired the interests of joint venture partner Carillion (in liquidation in the UK) in four Ontario hospital projects, becoming the sole service provider at Royal Ottawa Hospital, Oakville-Trafalgar Memorial Hospital, Brampton Civic Hospital and Sault Area Hospital.

In June 2023, Geoff Smith was succeeded as President and CEO by Kieran Hawe, previously COO. Geoff Smith remains Executive Chair of the Board of Directors.

EllisDon began the demolition and revitalization of Ontario Place in 2024.

== Selected projects ==
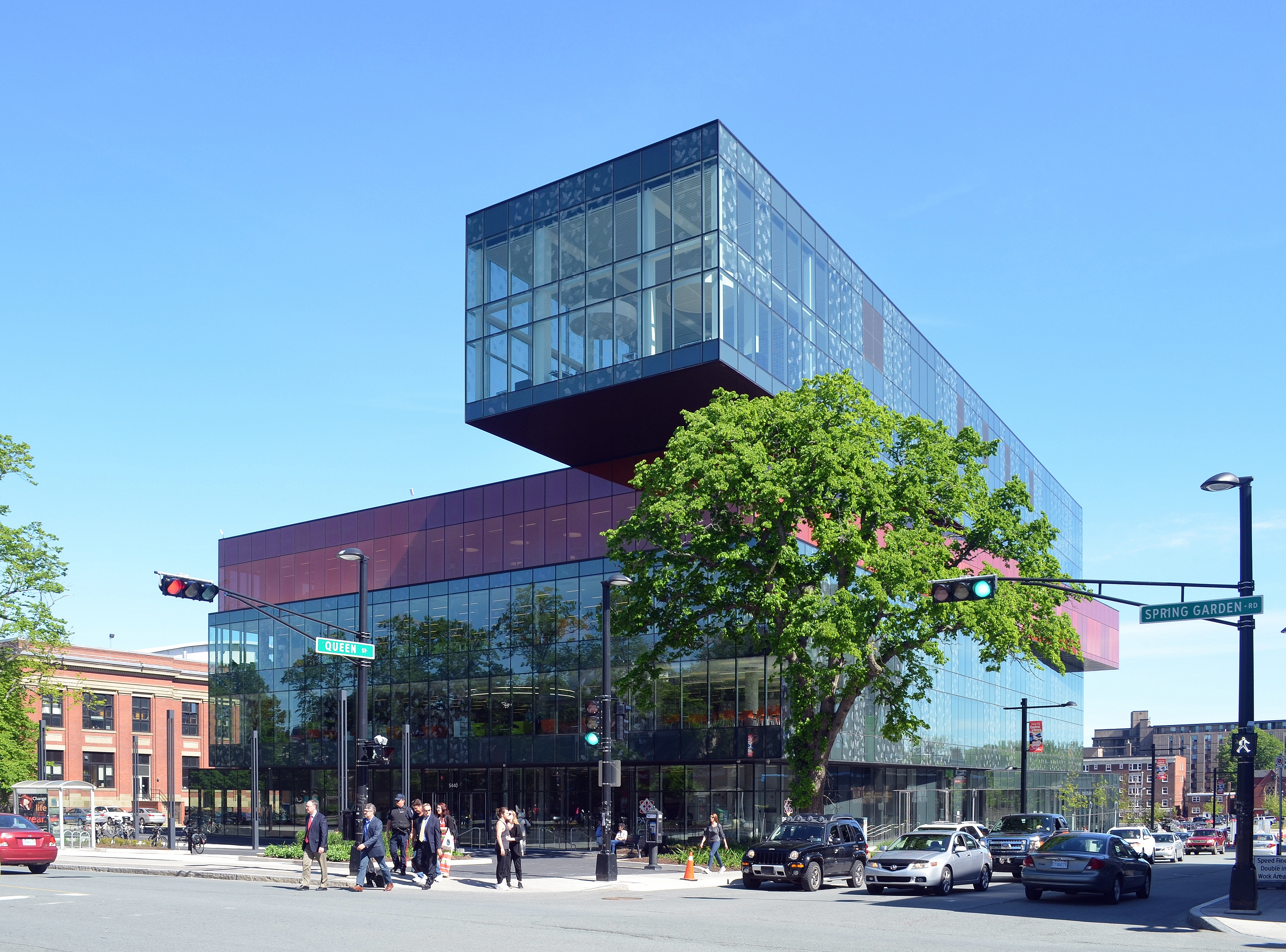
The Halifax Central Library, completed 2014

Alternative energy

- Alberta Children's Hospital – Calgary, Alberta
- Toronto South Detention Centre – Toronto, Ontario

Civil and transportation

- Highway 7 East Rapidway (H3) – Vivanext – York Region, Ontario
- Ottawa Light Rail Transit (LRT) Confederation Line – Ottawa, Ontario
- Union Station improvements – Toronto Transit Commission (TTC) – Toronto, Ontario

Commercial office/retail

- Brentwood Town Centre redevelopment – Burnaby, British Columbia
- Yorkdale Shopping Centre – Toronto, Ontario

Culture and recreation

- Goldring Centre for High Performance Sport – Toronto, Ontario
- Halifax Central Library – Halifax, Nova Scotia
- Rogers Centre (formerly Skydome) – Toronto, Ontario
- Remai Art Gallery of Saskatchewan – Saskatoon, Saskatchewan

Education

- Nova Scotia Community College, Centre for the Built Environment – Dartmouth, Nova Scotia
- Western University, Richard Ivey School of Business – London, Ontario

Healthcare and research

- Alberta Children's Hospital – Calgary, Alberta
- Oakville Trafalgar Memorial Hospital: a contract won by Ellis-Don for building and refurbishment work in 1991-1992 raised issues regarding their failure to appoint Naylor Group Inc. as electrical subcontractor, in breach of Naylor's "Contract A rights" arising from their submission of work prices being incorporated into Ellis-Don's successful bid.
- Surrey Memorial Hospital – Surrey, British Columbia

Industrial and automotive

- American Motors Brampton Assembly Plant – Brampton, Ontario (1987)

Public and government

- Hamilton City Hall renovations – Hamilton, Ontario
- Parliament Hill, West Block demolition and abatement – Ottawa, Ontario

Residential and hospitality

- Hyatt Regency Toronto

== Recognition ==
- 2018 Renew Canada's Top 100 Infrastructure Projects. Achieved Platinum Status.
- 2018 Mediacorp's Top 100 Employers (8th consecutive year).
- 2017 Mediacorp Canada's Greenest Employers
- 2017 Deloitte 50 Best Managed Companies
- 2016 Canada's Safest Employer
- 2016 Financial Post's Ten Best Companies To Work For
