= Universal Man =

Sculpture by Gerald Gladstone in Toronto, Ontario, Canada

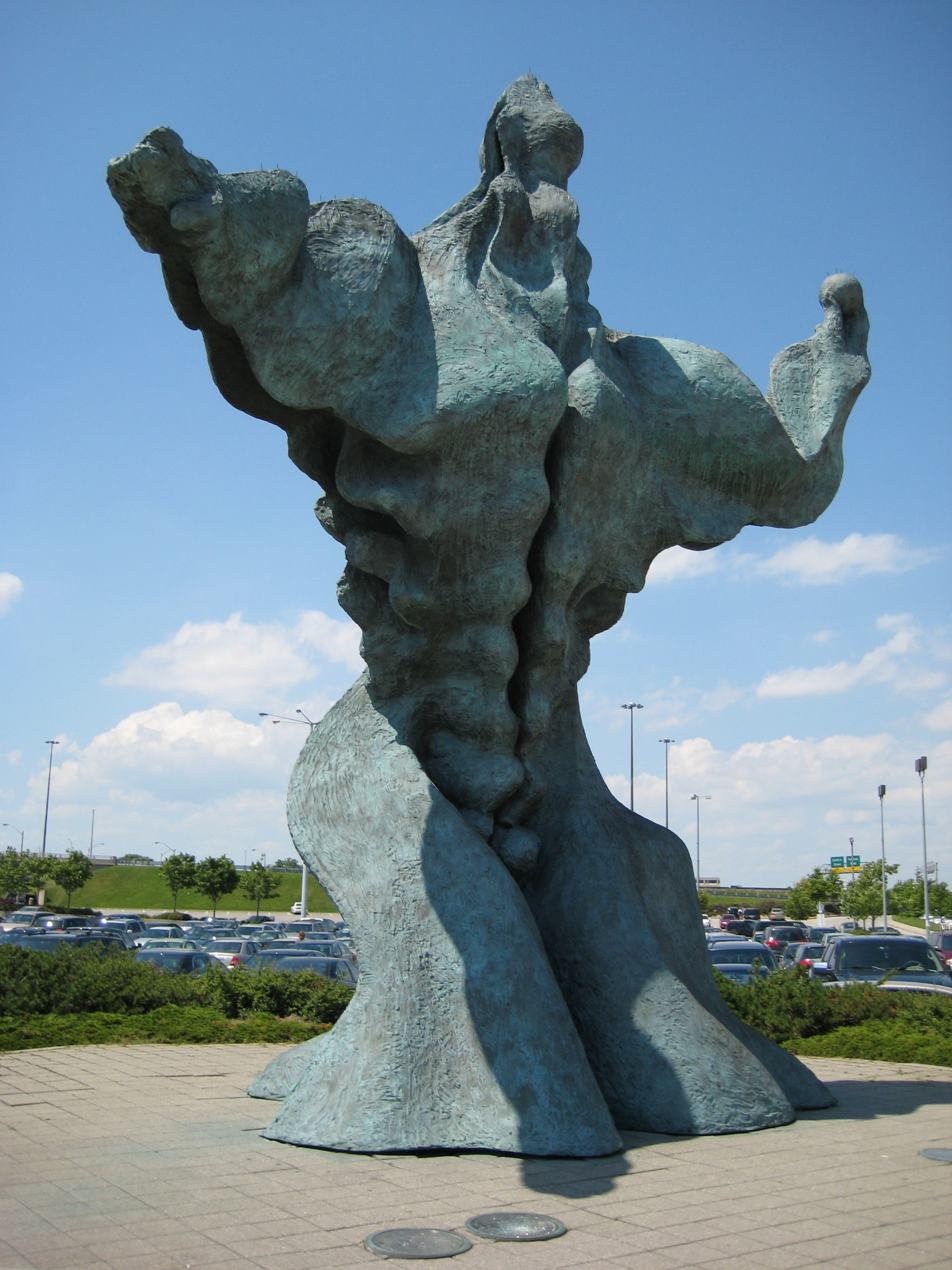
- Universal Man at its current Yorkdale location
- Artist: Gerald Gladstone
- Year: 1976
- Location: 43.725526°N 79.4557739°W
- Owner: Oxford Properties

Universal Man is a sculpture by Gerald Gladstone located outside the Yorkdale Shopping Centre in North York, Toronto, Ontario, Canada, since 1994. The 6.5-metre (21 ft) bronze figure was originally located in a prominent location at the foot of the CN Tower, there located to "emphasize the human aspects of the project". It was commissioned by CN Rail in 1972 at a cost of approximately $100,000 (approximately $750,000 in 2025 dollars) and the statue was unveiled in 1976. At the time of unveiling, it was the largest statue cast by the Morris Singer foundry.

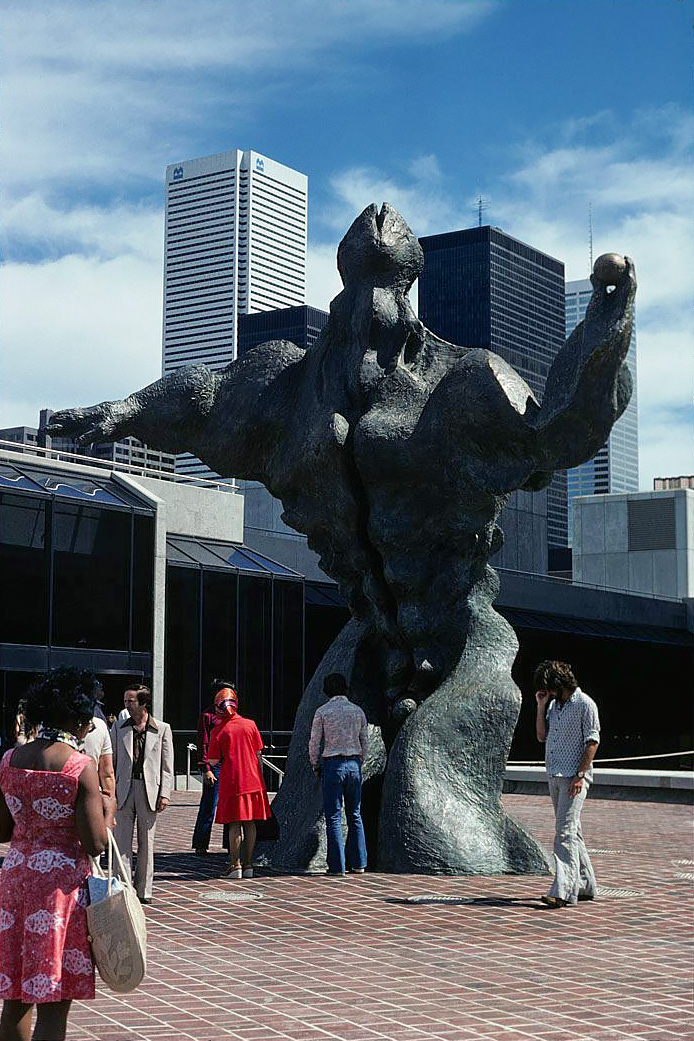
The sculpture at its original location adjacent to the CN Tower, 1976

According to Gladstone, the work was inspired by da Vinci's Vitruvian Man. The giant arms and legs of the figure represent the range of motion possible to a human figure. Until 1987, the statue was the centrepiece of a plaza near the CN Tower that was popular with tourists. This plaza would be replaced with Bobbie Rosenfeld Park.

In 1987, it was moved from its site during the construction of the Rogers Centre (then known as SkyDome) and was not replaced reportedly due to lack of space in the area. This, and the damage inflicted on the statue during moving (right hand broken off), infuriated Gladstone. CN moved the statue to a piece of vacant railway land by the Gardiner Expressway and Spadina Avenue, and placed the statue face down in the dirt field where it remained for several years. In 1994, it was restored (with damaged hand repaired) to public view by the government of North York who placed it by the Dufferin entrance to Yorkdale Mall. This was to Gladstone's satisfaction.

Since the municipalities that made up Metropolitan Toronto were amalgamated into the current city of Toronto in 1998, ownership of the sculpture was transferred to Oxford Properties, owner of Yorkdale Shopping Centre.
