= Bobbie Rosenfeld Park =

Park in Toronto, Ontario, Canada

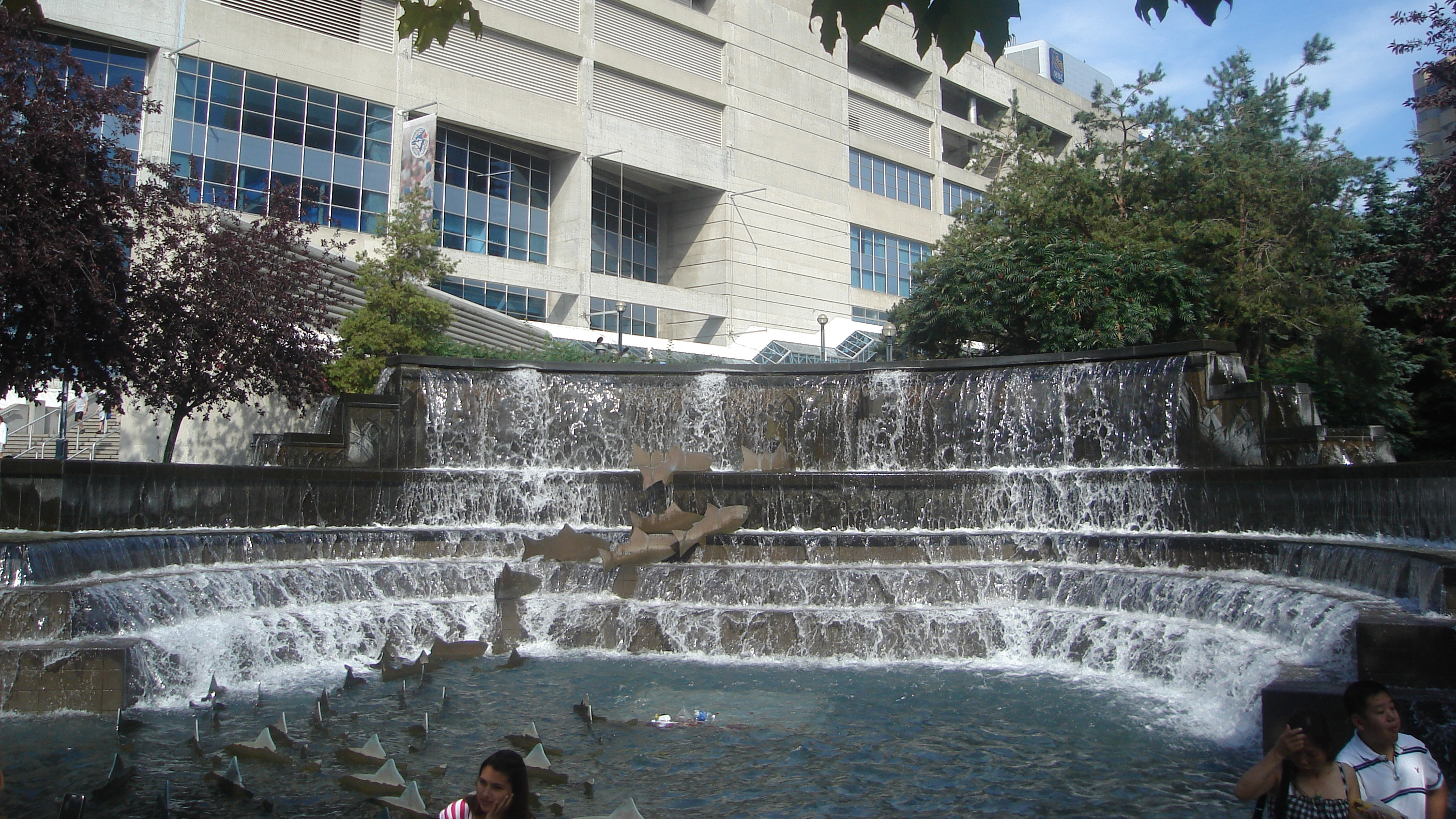
- Interactive map of Bobbie Rosenfeld Park
- Location: 280 Bremner Blvd., Toronto
- Coordinates: 43°38′30″N 79°22′23″W
- Operator: Toronto Parks
- Website: Bobbie Rosenfeld Park

Bobbie Rosenfeld Park is a public park near the CN Tower in Toronto, Ontario, Canada. In 1991, two years following the completion of the SkyDome (later renamed Rogers Centre in 2005), an open space between Rogers Centre and CN Tower was renamed Bobbie Rosenfeld Park, in honour of the Canadian athlete Bobbie Rosenfeld. The city-owned park is mainly an open space covered by paving stone and planters. There are some trees and concession stands selling food and other items to tourists and visitors in the area.

Located along the south end facing Bremner Avenue, there is a piece of artwork by artist Susan Schelle called Salmon Run. The sculpture is a representation of salmon leaping up a waterfall. The water fountain piece was not functional for many years, until it was restored in 2006.

Near both the park and the base of the tower, the Ripley's Aquarium of Canada opened on October 16, 2013.

Before the Rogers Centre was built, on what would later become Bobbie Rosenfield Park, there was the Universal Man sculpture by Gerald Gladstone. The sculpture has since been moved to Yorkdale Shopping Centre.
