= EY Tower =

Skyscraper in Toronto, Ontario

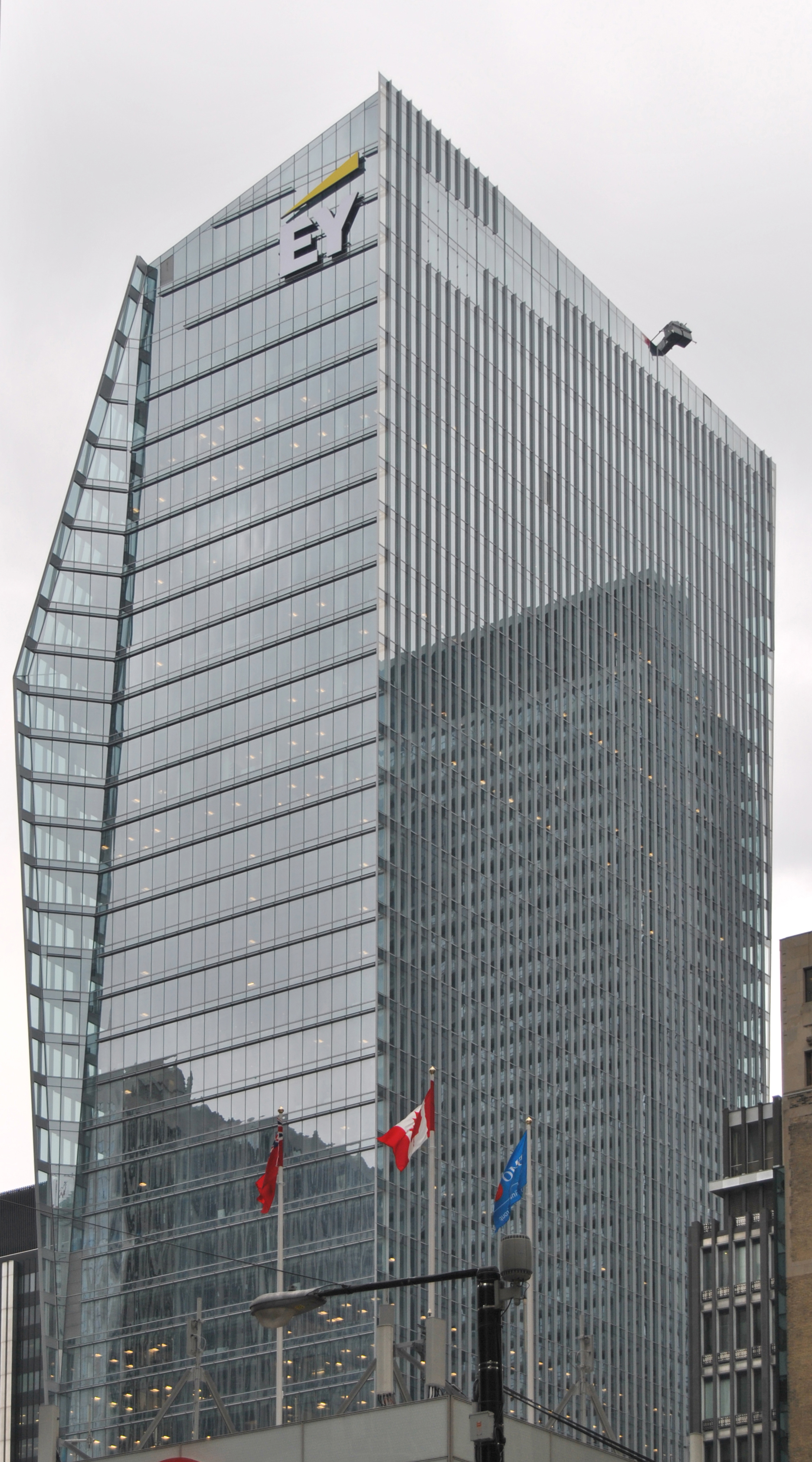
- The building in May 2017.
- Former names: Ernst & Young Tower; 100 Adelaide Street West

General information
- Status: Completed
- Type: Office, Retail
- Architectural style: Neomodern
- Location: 100 Adelaide Street West, Toronto, Ontario, Canada
- Coordinates: 43°38′58.902″N 79°22′56.611″W
- Completed: 2017
- Owner: Oxford Properties

Height
- Height: 188 m (617 ft)

Technical details
- Floor count: 42
- Floor area: 199,335.0 m^{2} (2,145,624 sq ft)

Design and construction
- Architecture firm: Kohn Pedersen Fox; WZMH Architects
- Engineer: Stephenson Engineering
- Civil engineer: MMM Group

Website
- www.100asw.com

The EY Tower (formerly known as the Ernst & Young Tower and 100 Adelaide Street West) is a skyscraper in Toronto, Ontario, Canada at 100 Adelaide Street West. The building was designed by Kohn Pedersen Fox and WZMH Architects.

== Original site ==
At its 1928 opening, 100 Adelaide Street West, was the Concourse Building which was a 14-story Art Deco structure. The building tenant was the Toronto Industrial Commission, which promoted the city as a hub of finance and business in Ontario. The building was famous for its mosaics by Group of Seven member J.E.H. MacDonald. The Concourse was designed by the firm of Baldwin and Greene. Oxford Properties took control of the building in 1998 and released plans to replace the Concourse Building with a new tower. The Concourse's defenders tried to find a buyer for the building, though Oxford refused to sell the site.

The decision to demolish the Concourse Building was controversial, but the Toronto and East York community councils ultimately voted in favour of the demolition in May 2000, with a vote of 38 to 12.

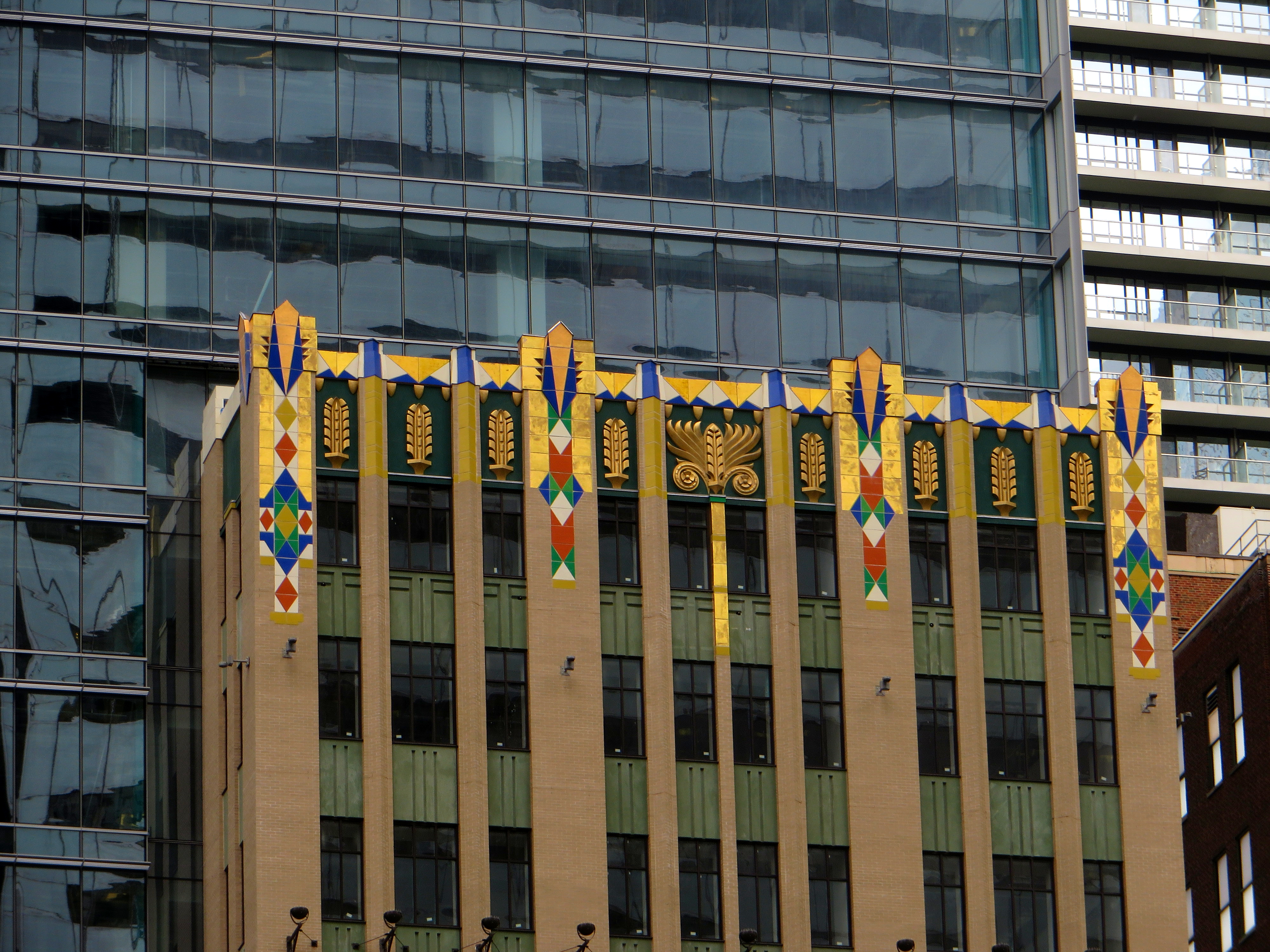
Art Deco details of the 1928 Concourse Building. Facades were incorporated in the new glass tower project. 2016

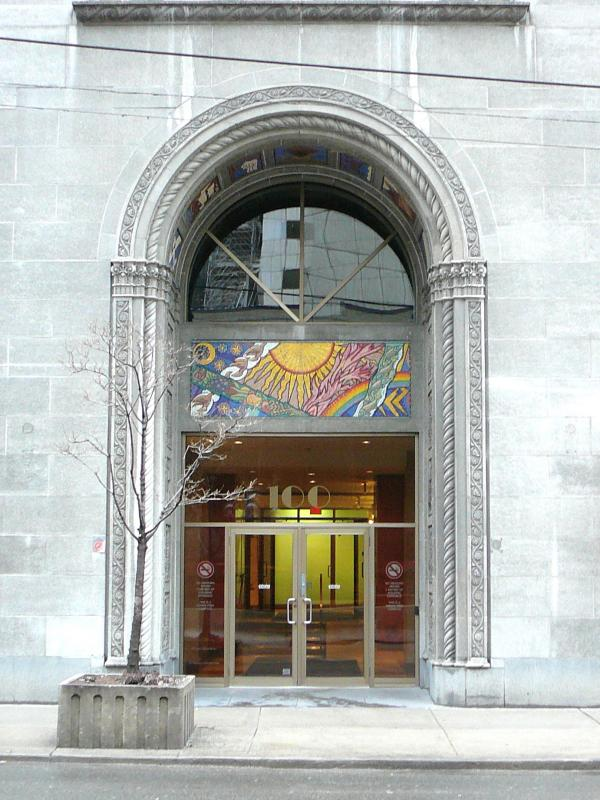
Entrance to the Concourse Building. 2010

== New building ==
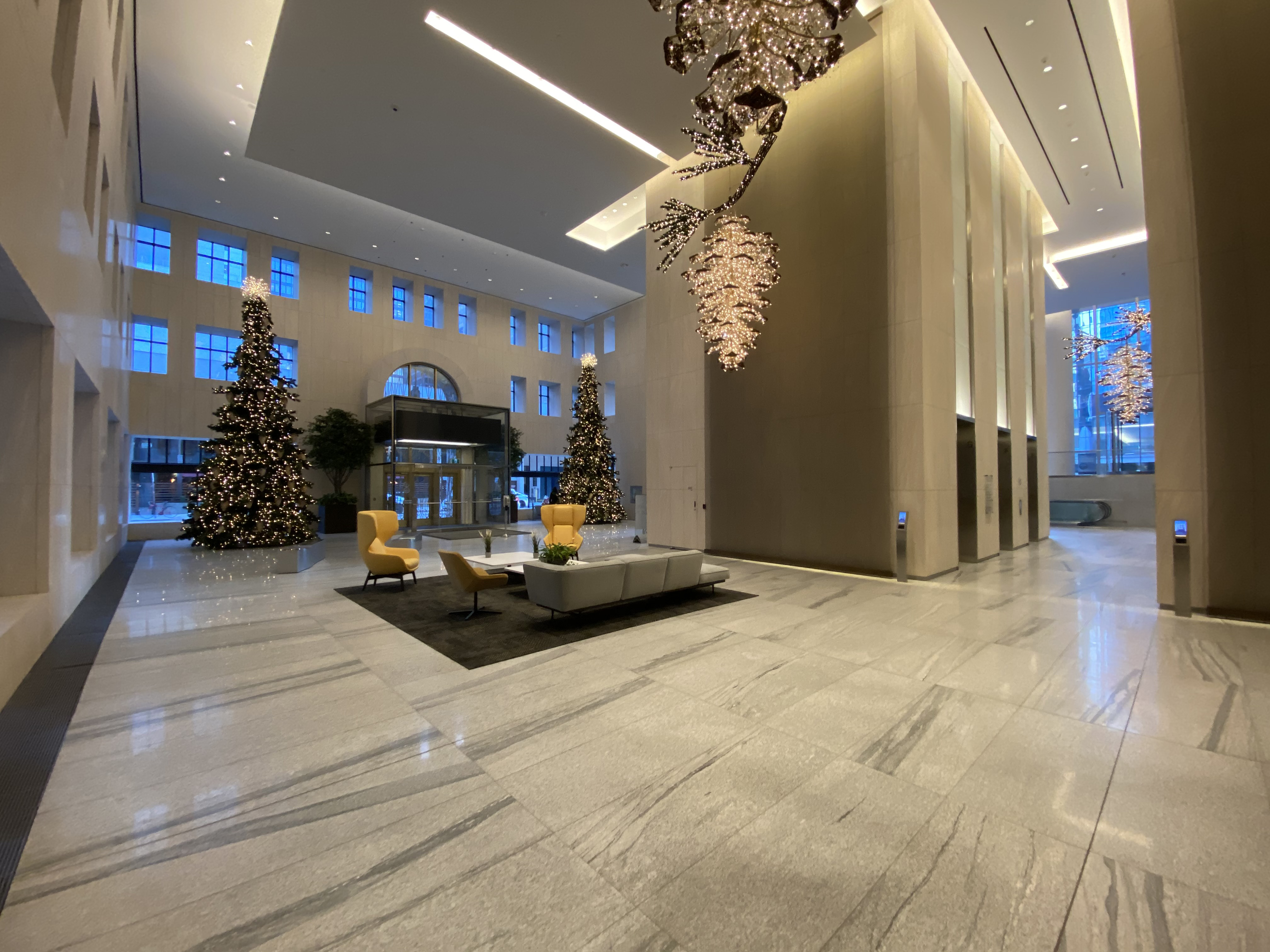
Office Lobby

Oxford released plans for the new building on 17 June 2013. The new proposal also announced that the building would be renamed from 100 Adelaide Street West, the street address of the site, to Ernst & Young Tower. Ernst and Young, the primary tenant of the new building, will be leasing 20,900 square metres (225,000 sq ft) of office space.

EY Tower is 188 m (617 ft) high, with 42 floors and a total area of 84,000 square metres (900,000 sq ft). The base of the new tower includes the south and east walls of the original Concourse Building and is integrated into the PATH as part of Oxford's Richmond-Adelaide Centre. The main tenants of the building are Ernst & Young, OMERS and TMX Group. In addition to a new public space and renovated entrance through the Concourse Building, the tower also features a 460 m^{2} (5,000 sq ft) outdoor terrace on the 14th floor. The building is LEED Platinum certified. The building was completed in 2017.

=== Construction ===
After many stages of planning, the tower's construction started in July 2014. On 23 April 2015, a worker fell from the building's third floor and landed near the construction site entrance on Adelaide Street. He was pronounced dead at the scene. The Tower was topped-out in June 2016 and opened in May 2017.

== See also ==
- Ernst & Young
- Richmond-Adelaide Centre
- Toronto Stock Exchange
