= Martin Luther King, Jr. Memorial (Compton) =

Sculpture in Compton, California

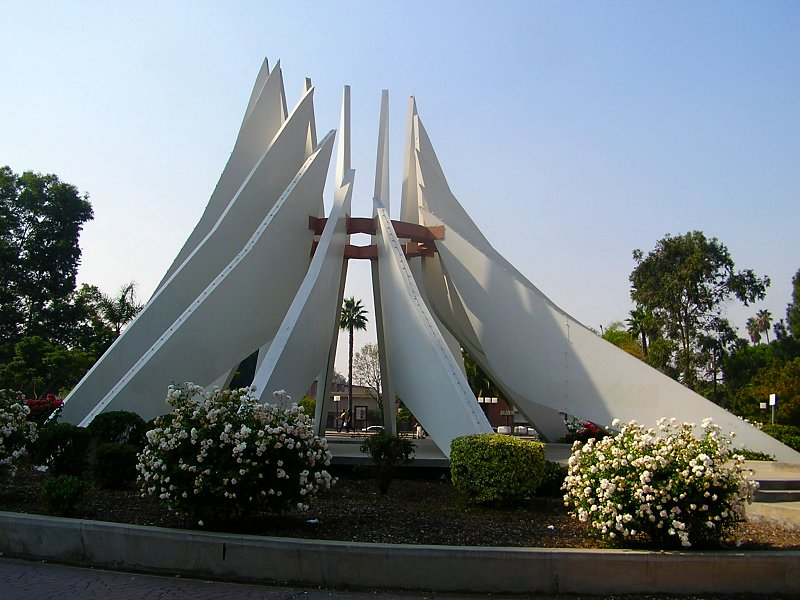
- The sculpture in 2007
- Artist: Gerald Gladstone
- Year: 1978
- Medium: Concrete and bronze
- Movement: Late modernism
- Subject: Fountain
- Location: Compton, California; 33.8950°N 118.2254°W
- Owner: Los Angeles County Arts Commission Civic Art Collection

The Martin Luther King, Jr. Memorial is a memorial dedicated to Martin Luther King Jr. in the civic center of Compton, California. It was built in 1978 by Gerald Gladstone. The architect of the civic center, Harold L. Williams, helped design it. The sculpture is surrounded by the Compton Courthouse, Compton Library, and Compton City Hall.

== History ==
The memorial was originally envisioned as a fountain and was commissioned by the county and Compton's Civic Center Authority to be the central point of the civic center plaza, which had just been completed in 1977. It was supposed to feature a 70 ft (21 m) spout of water shooting through the center.

== Description ==
The simple, straight, white panels rise from different locations and meet in a circle. Gladstone wanted to convey a feel of open space in the middle of the plaza, using a late modernism style. The sculpture also resembles a mountain, referencing King's final speech "I've Been to the Mountaintop". At the center is a shallow reflecting pool, replacing the planned fountain.
