= Female Landscape =

1972 sculpture by Gerald Galdstone

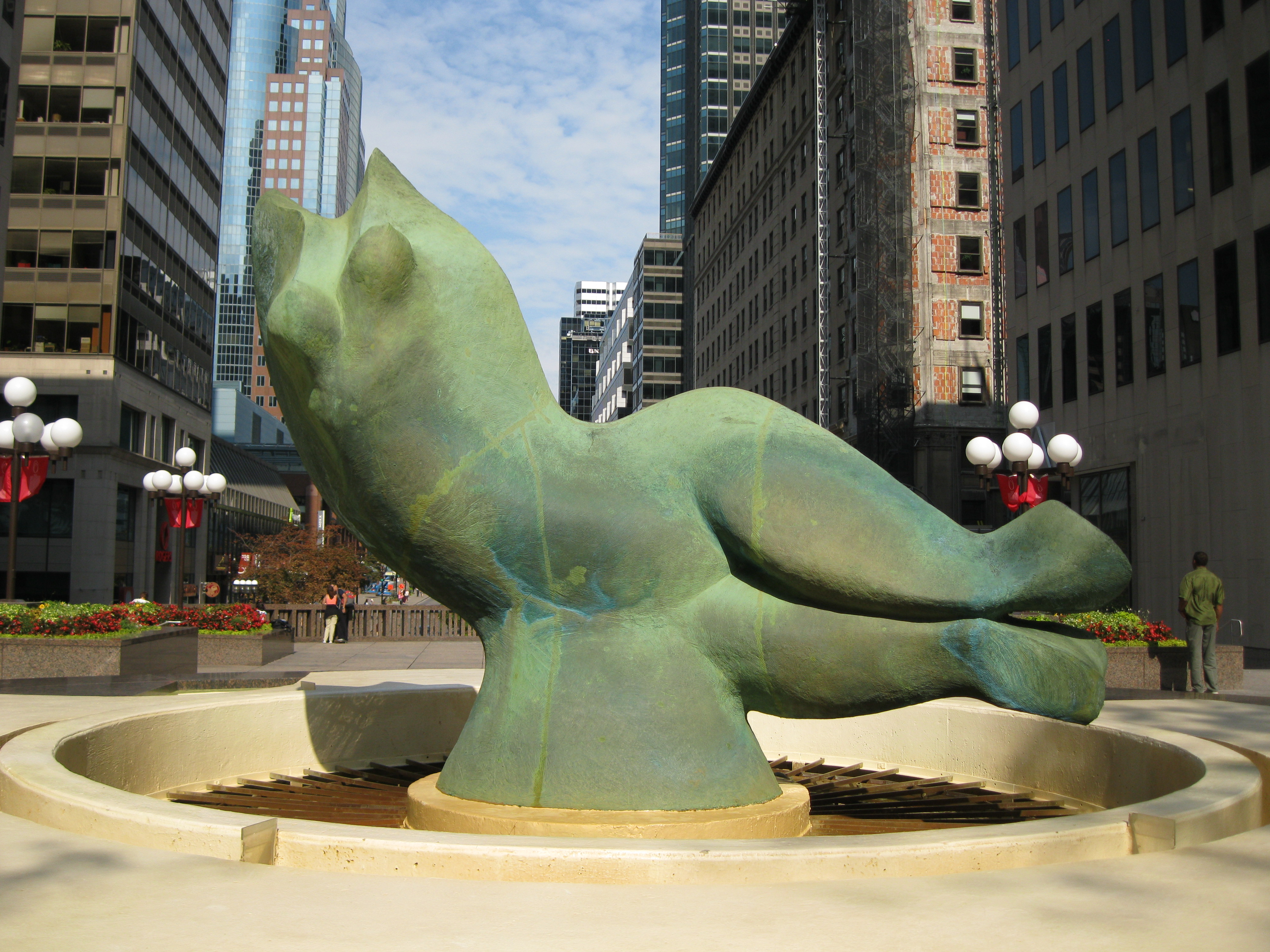
- The sculpture in 2012
- Artist: Gerald Gladstone
- Year: 1972
- Location: Montreal, Quebec, Canada; 45°30′05″N 73°34′11″W

Female Landscape, or Feminine Landscape, is an outdoor 1972 sculpture by Gerald Gladstone, installed in a fountain in the outdoor plaza of Montreal's Place Ville Marie complex, in Quebec, Canada.

== See also ==
- 1972 in art
