= Gerald Gladstone =

Canadian sculptor and painter (1929–2005)

- Born: 7 January 1929; Toronto, Ontario, Canada
- Died: 7 March 2005 (aged 76); Toronto, Ontario, Canada
- Education: Royal College of Art
- Known for: sculptor and painter.
- Movement: figurative sculpture
- Awards: elected member of the Royal Canadian Academy of Arts in 1974

Gerald Gladstone RCA (7 January 1929 – 7 March 2005) was a Canadian sculptor and painter.

== Life ==
Born in 1929 in Toronto, Ontario, Canada to Ralph and Dora Gladstone, Gerald was the sixth of nine children. In his youth, Gladstone was as committed to music as he was to painting, teaching himself to play the clarinet and forming a jazz band.

He married in his early twenties supporting his young family with a variety of jobs ending up with a position in commercial advertising. He set up a sculpture studio and began working on a series of welded pieces influenced by Constructivism. In the 1950s, Gladstone was exhibited by Toronto gallery owner Av Isaacs along with artists such as Michael Snow, Gordon Rayner, Graham Coughtry, and Tony Urquhart.

In 1959, he received his first Canada Council of the Arts grant and relocated to London, England. He studied at the Royal College of Art where he met and befriended the British sculptor Henry Moore. Under Moore's influence, Gladstone began a long period of experimentation with figurative work.

In 1967, Gladstone received three commissions for Montreal's Expo 67, but several years later he was struggling to find work. There was an exhibition of his mid- to late-career plastic cube sculptures and his Downtown Nudes Series - a collection of oils on canvas - at the opening exhibition of Toronto's St. Lawrence Centre for the Arts, and in 1973 he produced the Electric Figure Series, another collection of oils on canvas. Among his late-career commissions were the Three Graces, a fountain and bronze sculpture for the Ontario government buildings, Female Landscape, a fountain and bronze sculpture at Montreal's Place Ville Marie, Optical Galaxy Sculpture, a fountain and sculpture in Belconnen, Australia, and in 1978 a fountain and precast concrete sculpture for a Martin Luther King Jr. memorial in a Civic Center plaza in Compton, California. The sculptures in the entrance of La Ronde in Montréal Québec Canada are made by Gladstone. Other works include:

- McGillivray Fountain 1968, Exhibition Place, Toronto
- Pylon 1960, 170 Memorial Park Avenue, Toronto
- Solar Net 1963, Larkin Building (University of Toronto St. George Campus) Devonshire Place, Toronto
- Galaxy Series Number2 1967, inside Macdonald Block, 900 Bay Street, Toronto
- Female Landscape 1972, Place Ville Marie, Montreal

In 1990, Gladstone set up a studio in Beaverton, Ontario. The Art Gallery of Ontario held a retrospective of his work in 2003. He was made a member of Royal Canadian Academy of Arts Gladstone died on March 7, 2005, in Toronto.

== Works ==
Gladstone's Downtown Nudes, oil on canvas, 1970s

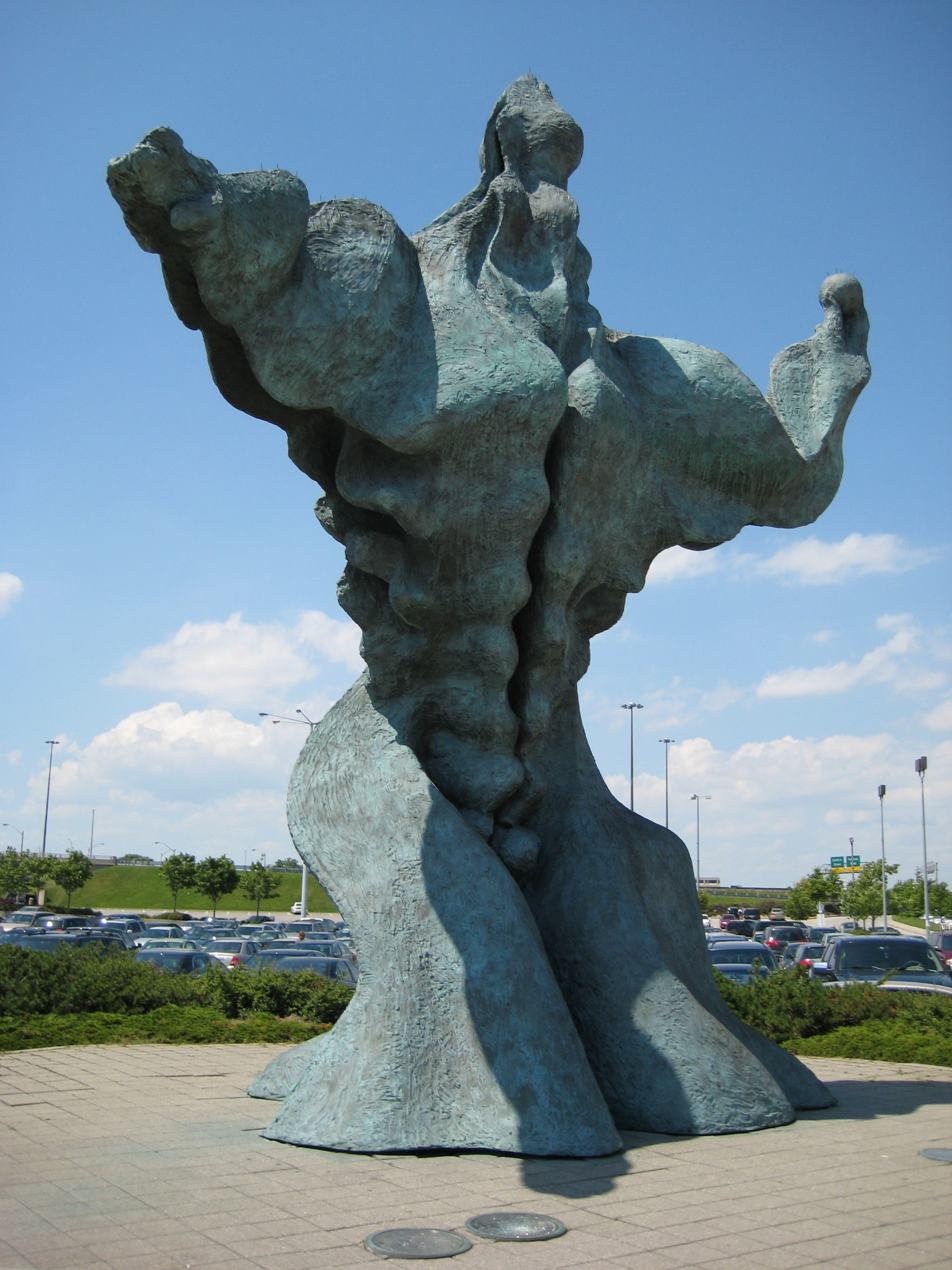
Gladstone's Universal Man, sculpture, 1976, Yorkdale Mall, Toronto

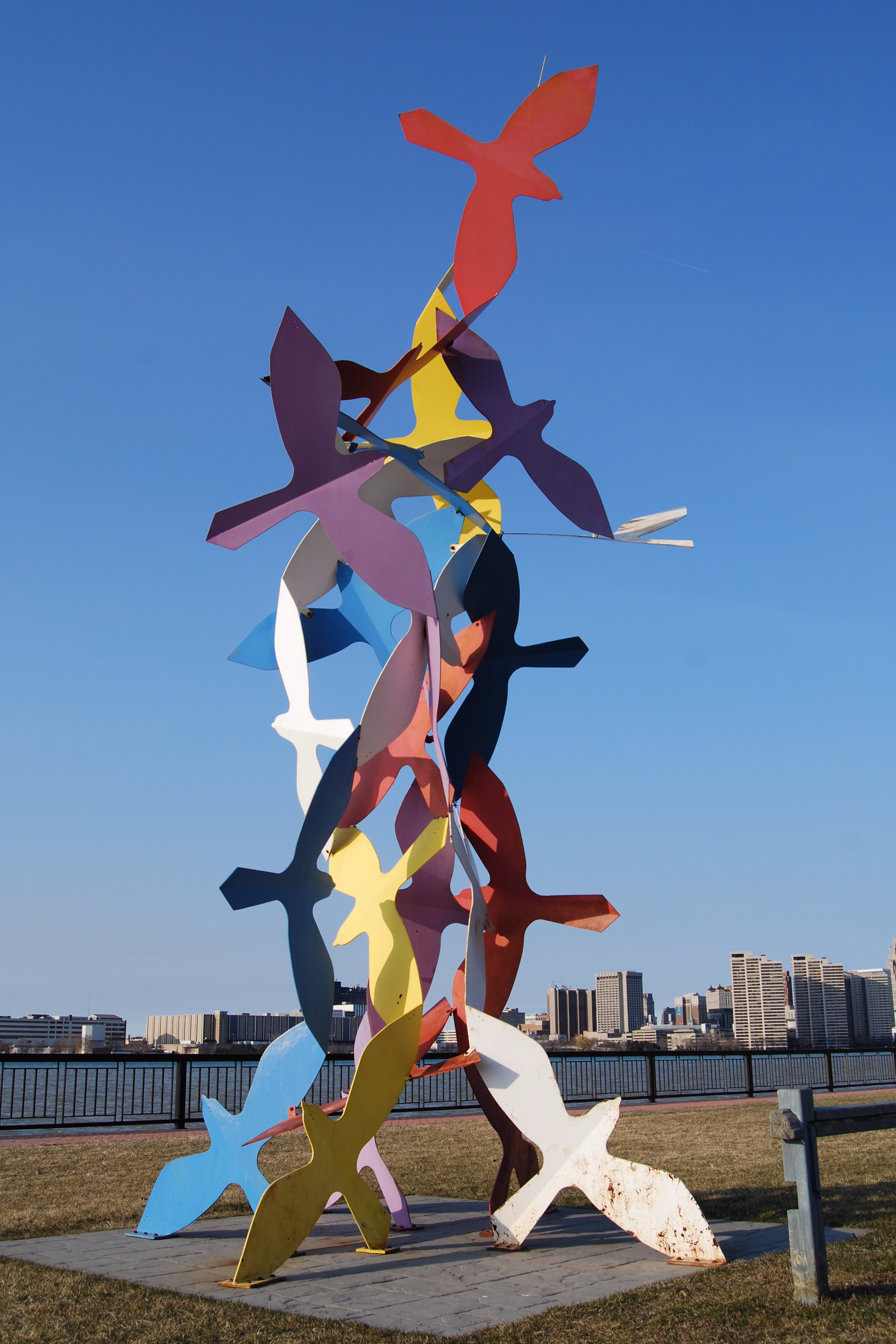
Gladstone's Morning flight in Odette Sculpture Park, Windsor Canada

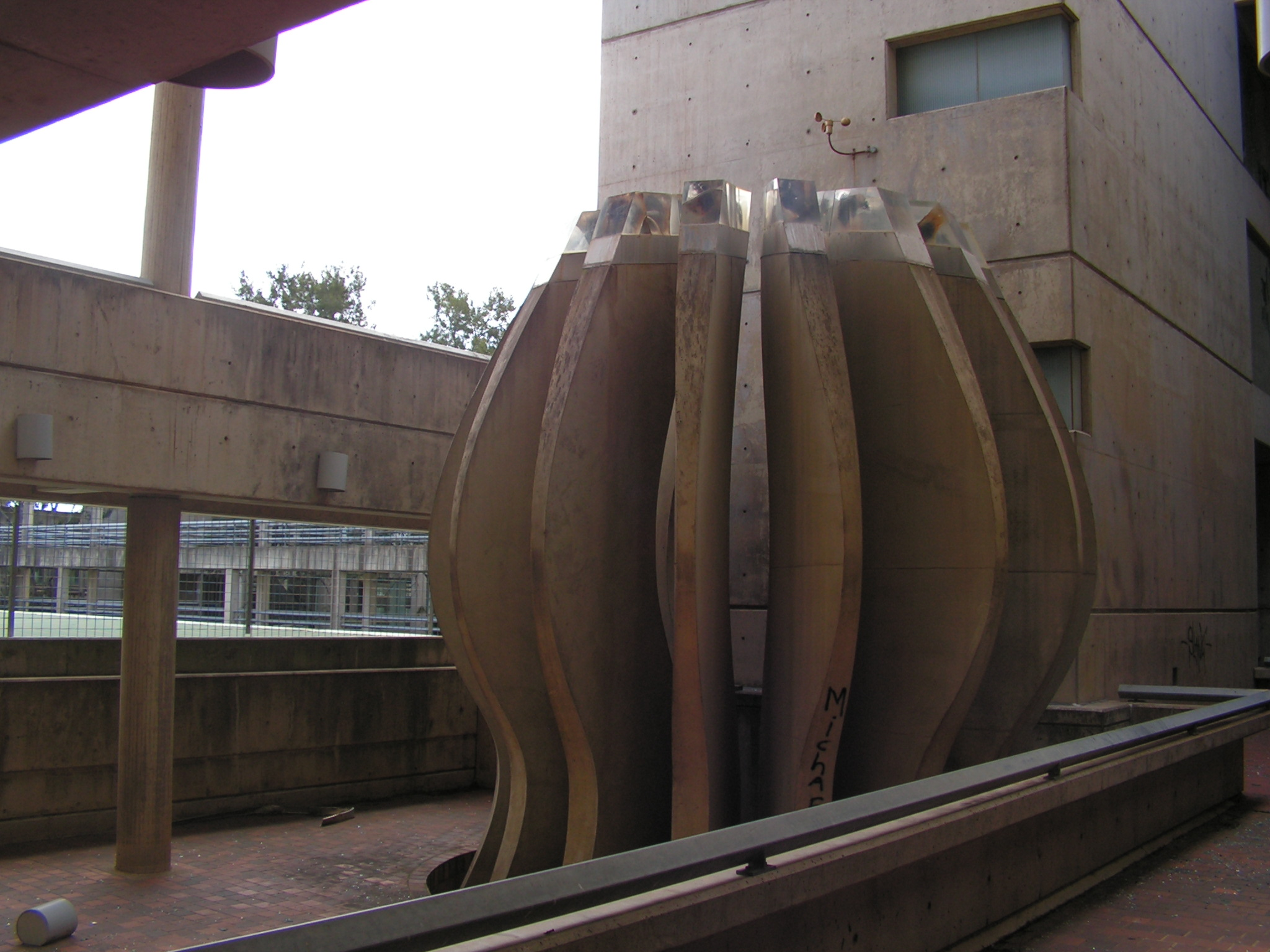
Gladstone's Galaxy at Cameron Offices, Town Square expresses humanity's concern with its position in intergalactic space, Canberra ACT, Australia

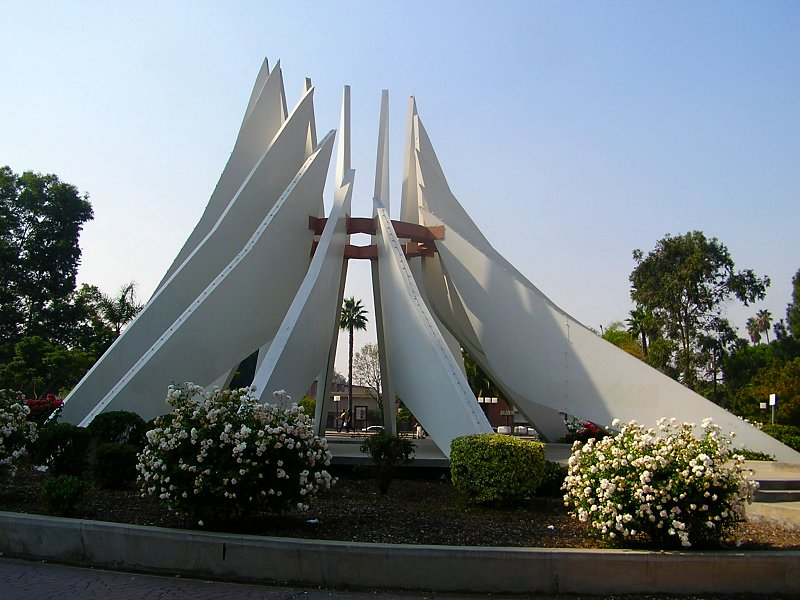
Gladstone's Martin Luther King, Jr. Memorial, 1978, in Civic Center Plaza of Compton, California

== Selected exhibitions ==
- 1967: Expo 67, Montreal
- 2003: Art Gallery of Ontario, Toronto: Gladstone: Event Horizon

== Selected collections ==
- National Gallery of Canada, Ottawa
- Art Gallery of Ontario, Toronto
