= Yorkdale Shopping Centre =

Shopping mall in North York, Toronto

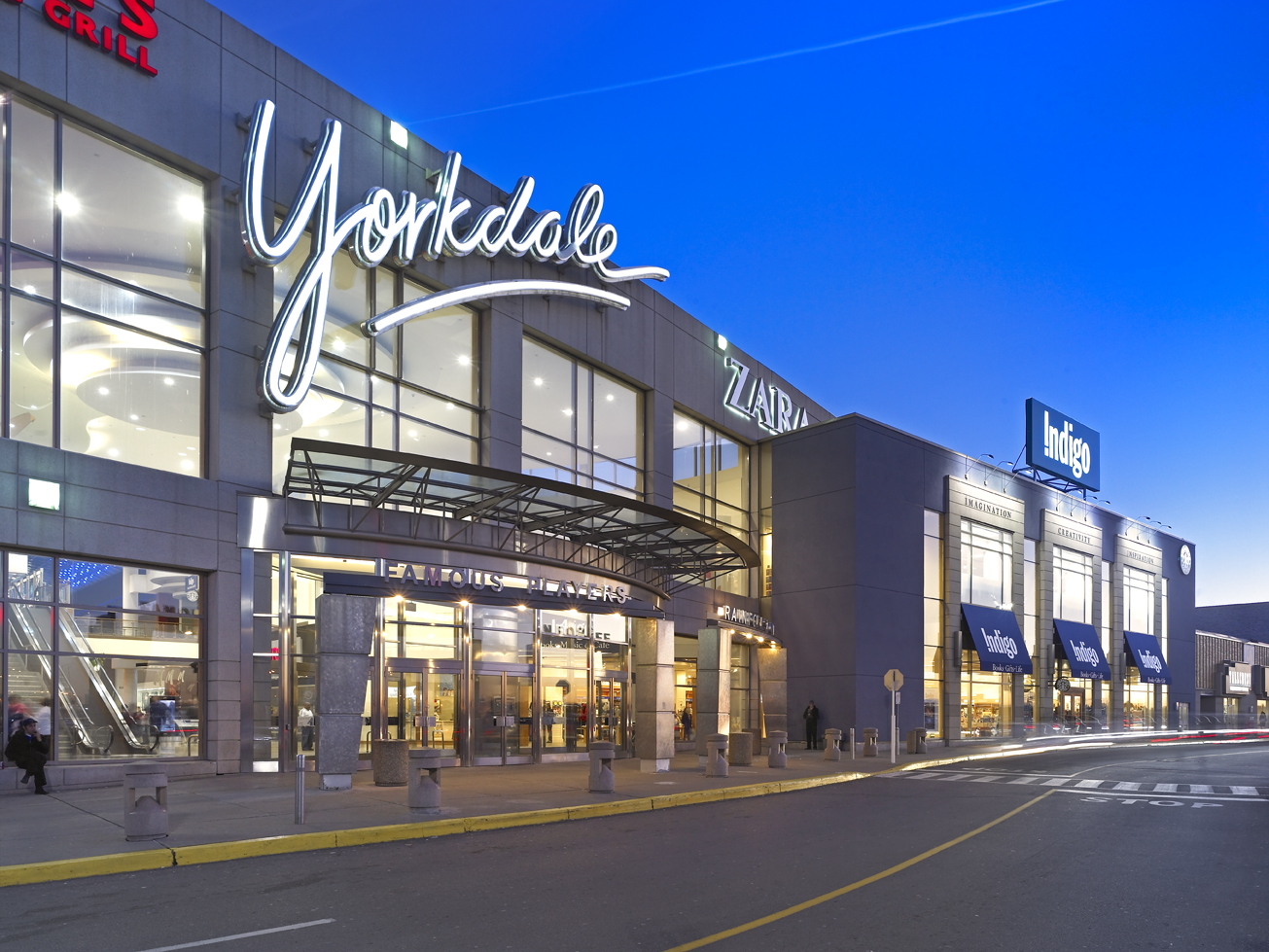
- North entrance exterior (2008)
- Interactive map of the Yorkdale Shopping Centre area
- Alternative names: Yorkdale (colloquial name); Yorkdale Mall

General information
- Status: Open
- Type: Shopping mall
- Location: 3401 Dufferin Street; Toronto, Ontario; M6A 2T9
- Coordinates: 43.725599°N 79.452696°W
- Opened: February 26, 1964; 62 years ago
- Renovated: 1984; 1999; 2005–2007; 2013
- Owner: AIMCo (50%); OMERS (50%)
- Operator: Oxford Properties

Technical details
- Floor count: 3 (mall concourse and food court); 4 (Hudson's Bay and RH); 1 (shipping and receiving underground level)
- Floor area: 1,845,725 square feet (171,473.5 m^{2}) of gross leasable area

Design and construction
- Architect: John Graham Jr.
- Developer: Trizec Corporation

Other information
- Number of stores: 250
- Number of anchors: 6
- Parking: 4 parking lots; 4 parkades; 1 valet
- Public transit: Yorkdale; Yorkdale Bus Terminal; Toronto Transit Commission Buses

Website
- yorkdale.com

Yorkdale Shopping Centre is a shopping mall in Toronto, Ontario, Canada, at the southwest corner of the Highway 401 and Allen Road interchange in the former city of North York. It spans 1,845,725 square feet (171,473.5 m^{2}) of selling space and has sales of CA$1,905 per square foot (CA$20,505.25 per square metre), making it the country's third-largest mall by area, and the mall with the highest sales per unit area. It is one of the country's busiest malls, with 18 million visitors annually, and many international retailers have entered the Canadian market at Yorkdale.

It opened in 1964 as the largest enclosed shopping mall in the world. Yorkdale is currently owned by a joint venture between the Ontario Municipal Employees Retirement System (OMERS) through its subsidiary Oxford Properties Group and the Alberta Investment Management Corporation.

== Development ==
=== Construction and design ===
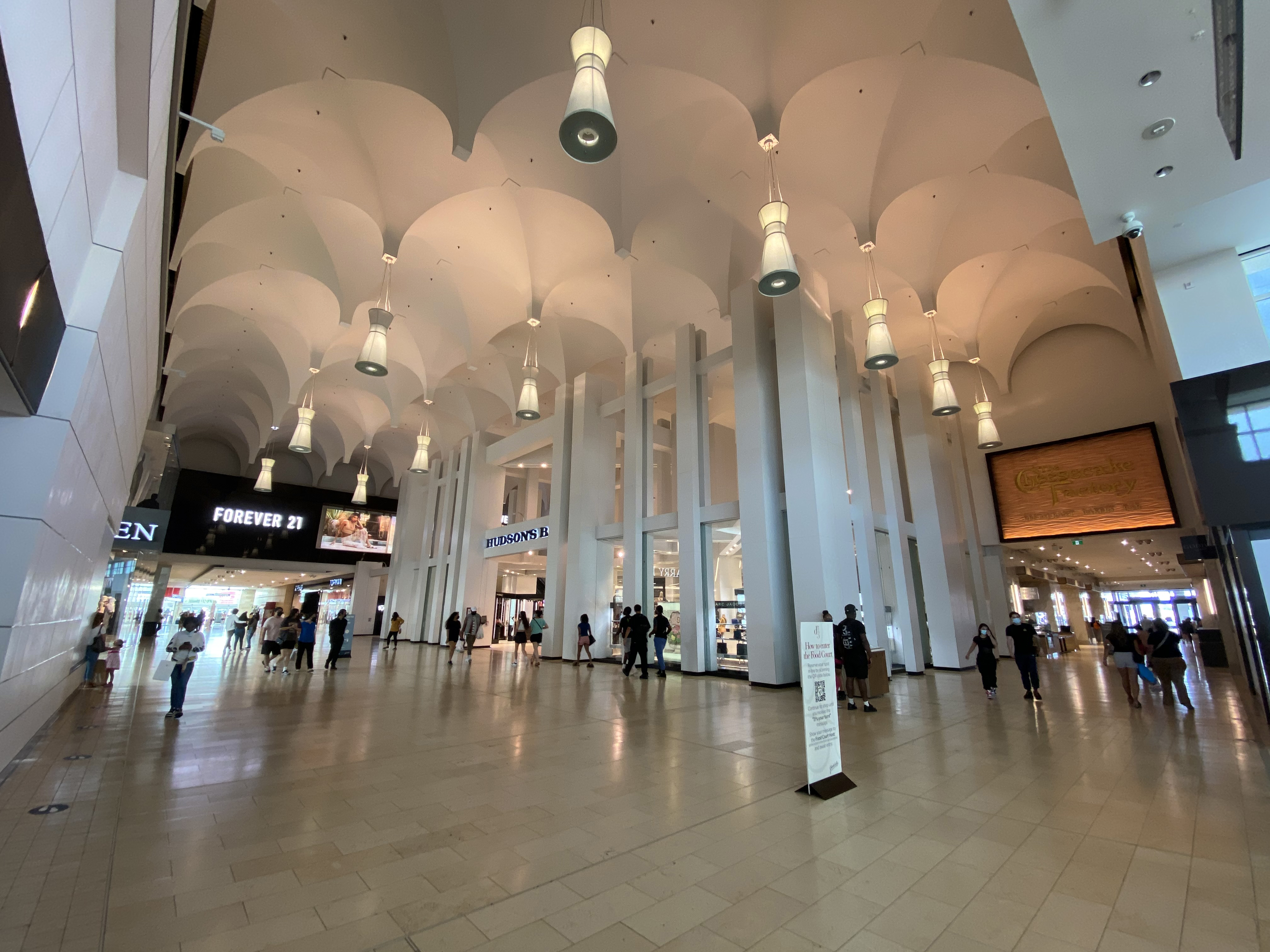
The Void located near Hudson's Bay retains the original design back when Simpson's occupied the Hudson's Bay space

In the 1950s, the department store chain T. Eaton & Co. bought a 40-hectare (99-acre) site at Dufferin Street and Highway 401 for a new massive, suburban location. In 1958, rival department store chain Simpson's purchased an 8-hectare (20-acre) site to the east and the plan to build the complex was announced that year. Design of the mall was given to the Seattle firm of John Graham Consultants, except for the Simpson's store, designed by John Andrews of John B. Parkin Associates. Howard Lesser was the planning and development consultant. Using Lesser's market research, the developers determined how much floor space to give up to each category of retailer, and chose retailers who would appeal to a broad range of shoppers.

The mall opened on February 26, 1964, under the ownership of the Trizec Corporation. Its gross leasable area (GLA) was over 1,000,000 sq ft (93,000 m^{2}), by far the biggest in Canada at the time. It was one of the largest shopping centres in the world. When it opened, Yorkdale was the first Canadian mall to include two major department stores: Simpson's and Eaton's, under the same roof at a cost of CA$40 million ($400 million in 2025 dollars). The mall had the shape of the letter L and was bordered in its extremities by Simpson's and grocery store Dominion, while Eaton's was at the junction of the two corridors; the mall also had a small public library. Yorkdale was the first major suburban mall constructed in Toronto. Located at the edge of the urbanized city, the new shopping centre was dependent on the construction of the Spadina Expressway, later renamed Allen Road after Metro chairman William R. Allen, as the developers would not proceed until the freeway was approved for construction.

The mall was constructed with a novel system for its retailers to receive merchandise. While other Canadian shopping centres had their receiving doors located at the backside, Yorkdale was constructed with a one-way, two-lane road for trucks running beneath the centre that leads directly to retailers' basement storages. The design of the mall included a 18-metre (60 ft) tall atrium, 12-metre (40 ft) wide halls and 8.2-metre (27 ft) tall ceilings. The corridors still retain this look and feel although renovations in 2006 replaced the ceilings, windows, floors and skylights.

=== Expansions and renovations ===
==== 1980s–1990s ====
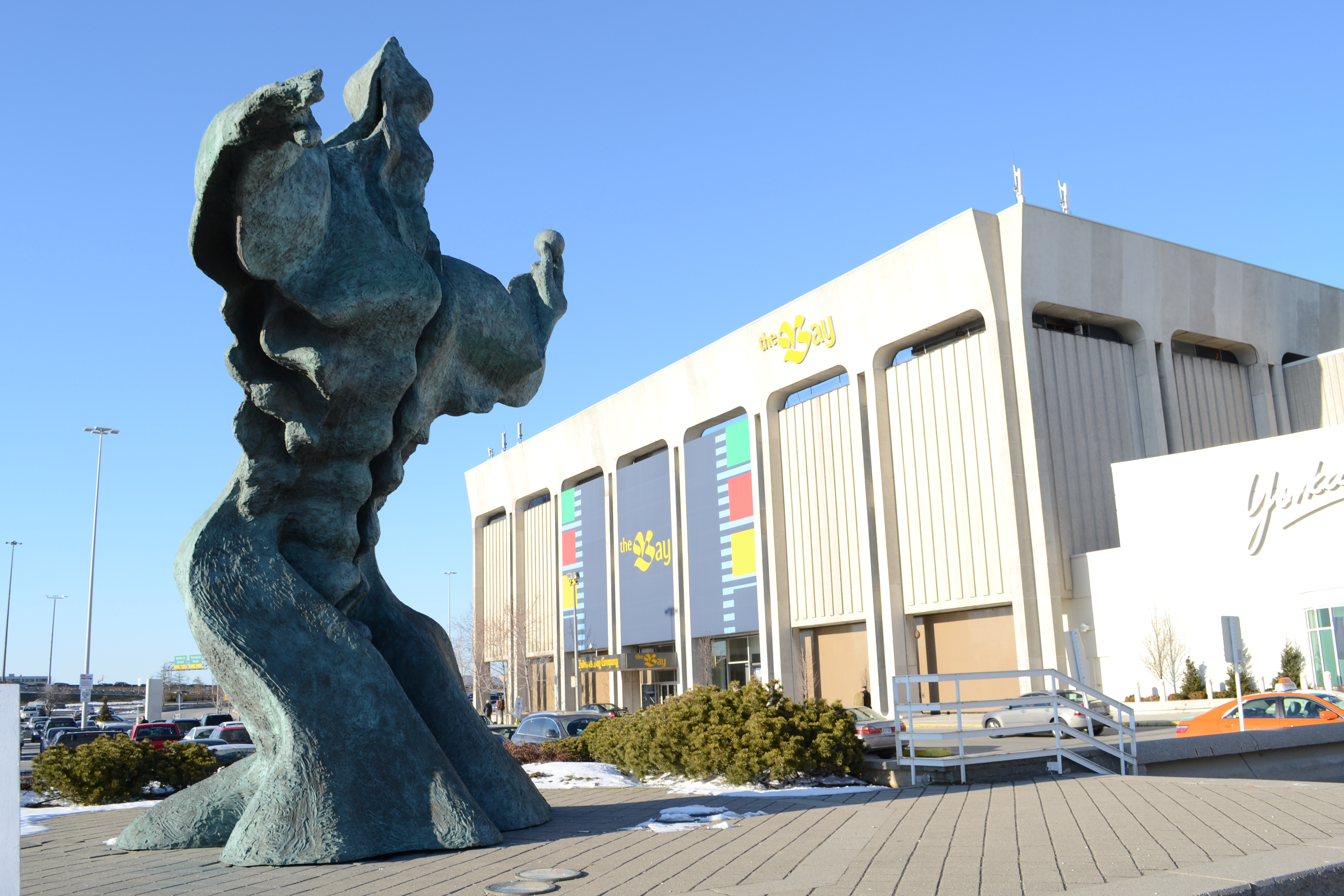
The Universal Man statue was relocated from the base of the CN Tower to the west parking lot of Yorkdale in 1994.

In 1984, Yorkdale expanded with 75 new stores bringing an additional 153,000 sq ft (14,200 m^{2}) to the mall. It expanded again in 1986 to reach 1,300,000 sq ft (120,000 m^{2}), having now more than doubled its number of stores from when it first opened.

In 1991, the Simpson's store was converted to a The Bay store after Hudson's Bay Company purchased the Simpson's chain in 1978. An existing The Bay store, that had joined the mall in November 1988, was sold to Sears Canada in the process.

The Universal Man statue in the west parking lot was relocated from the base of the CN Tower—to accommodate the construction of the Rogers Centre (then known as SkyDome) in 1987—to Yorkdale in 1994.

In 1999, Yorkdale completed a major overhaul, adding a Rainforest Café restaurant, a Famous Players SilverCity movie theatre (which has since been taken over by Cineplex Entertainment and rebranded as such), and a two-storey Indigo Books and Music store on the north side of the northeast corner of the mall, facing Highway 401.

==== 2000s ====
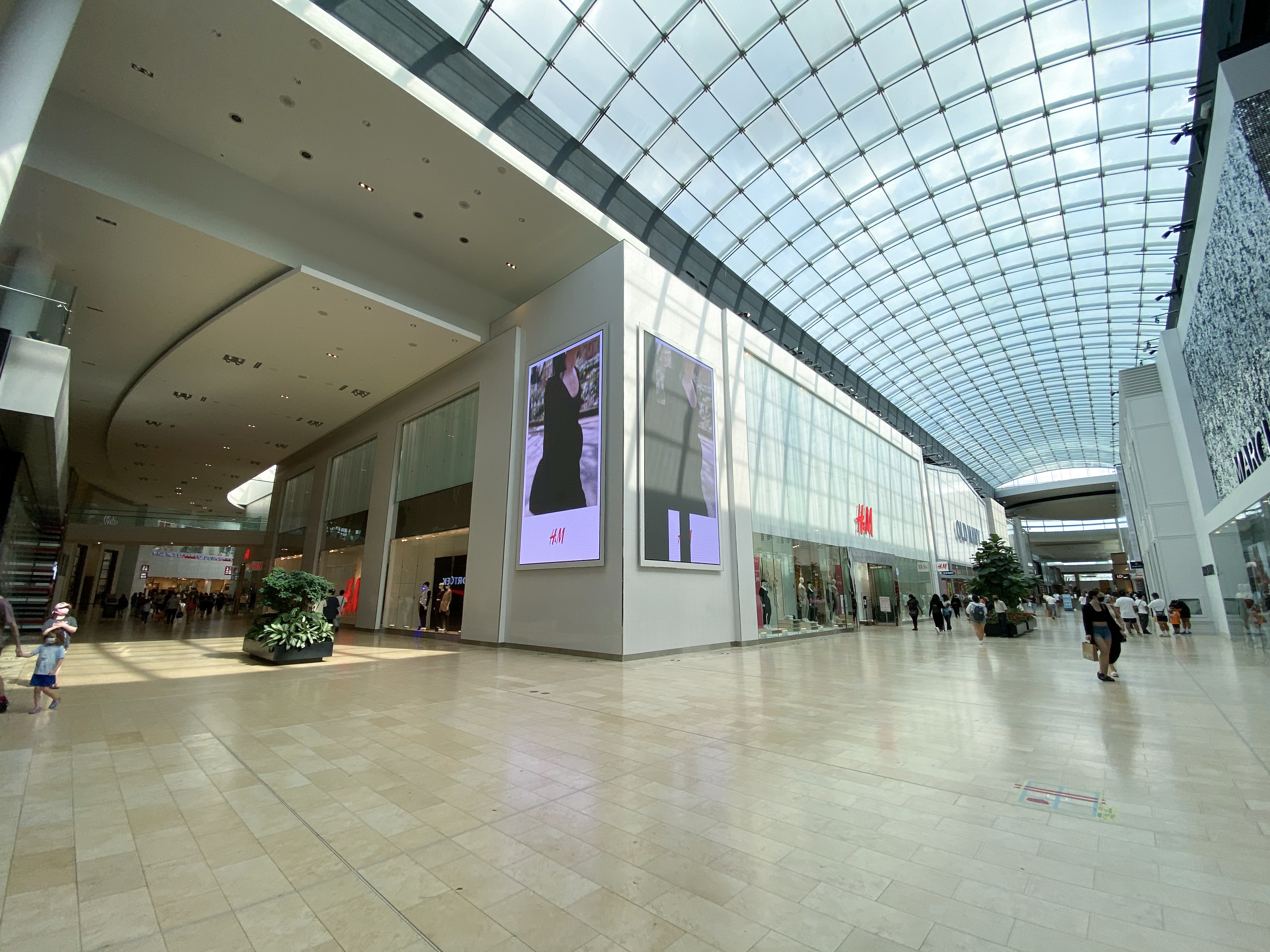
High glass atrium running 91 metres (300 ft) completed in 2006

In 2005, a CA$60 million expansion on the former site of its Eaton's department store increased the size of Yorkdale to 1,404,646 ft^{2} (130,495.9 m^{2}), and increased the number of stores from about 210 to 260. A highlight of this expansion was the construction of a 18-metre (60 ft) high glass atrium running 91 metres (300 ft) in length, which hangs from an exterior support structure. The expansion added Old Navy, Zara, H&M, and Home Outfitters as sub-anchors. This gave Yorkdale the title of the third-largest shopping mall in Ontario after sister mall Square One Shopping Centre in Mississauga and Cadillac Fairview's Toronto Eaton Centre in downtown Toronto, ahead of Scarborough Town Centre in terms of retail floor space.

The renovation project continued into 2006 and 2007. This renovation matched the earlier sections of the mall to the style of the 2005 expansion. Key elements of this project included new public washrooms, the opening of a Moxies Grill & Bar restaurant (this location closed in January 2026), and new sliding automatic doors at all entrances. An advertising campaign, branded as "Change It Up!" was launched in conjunction with the renovation and redevelopment, winning a MAXI Award from the International Council of Shopping Centers (ICSC) in 2007.

Expansion continued in the second half of the decade. In April 2008, Yorkdale opened a Michael Kors store. Later additions included Armani Exchange, Crate & Barrel, BOSS, and a Tiffany & Co.

==== 2010s ====
In January 2011, Yorkdale announced another expansion, adding another 145,000 sq ft (13,500 m^{2}), sufficient for 40 storefronts, and 800 underground parking spaces. This new wing took the space of the southwest parking lot. The expansion also relocated and doubled the number of seats at the food court, improved public access, and landscaped portions of the property. The expansion, costing $35 million, was opened in the summer of 2012, and completed in November 2012. The existing food court was relocated to a new location on the second and third levels of the former Eaton's department store. The new food court, named "Dine on 3", covers 45,000 sq ft (4,200 m^{2}) over two floors and features 18 different eateries, including A&W, KFC, New York Fries, Subway (which was later replaced with McDonald's), and the second Ontario location of Chick-fil-A (after the first at One Bloor in downtown Toronto). The second level of the foot court had an Illy café, which was replaced with a Shake Shack restaurant in February 2025, the third such location in Toronto. The area of the former food court was redeveloped into a new wing, which housed new stores including a Microsoft Store, DavidsTea, and a Tesla showroom, as well as a larger Apple Store. The new parking garage was built below the wing.

In 2012, Holt Renfrew expanded to the west by adding 18,925 sq ft (1,758.2 m^{2}) to the existing 65,047 sq ft (6,043.1 m^{2}) as part of another increase to the mall floor space.

In April 2013, Yorkdale announced a CA$330 million expansion, which would add an additional 298,000 sq ft (27,700 m^{2}) of retail, featuring a three-level 188,000 sq ft (17,500 m^{2}) Nordstrom store and a Uniqlo store. This project involved the closure of the Rainforest Café (at Yorkdale since 1999), as well as the demolition of the multi-level parking garage at the southeast of the complex bordering Yorkdale Road. The project began in January 2014 and the new wing opened for business in late 2016. Rainforest Café has since been replaced with an expansion of Sport Chek.

In June 2013, Sears Canada announced the closing of their store at Yorkdale. The former Sears space was renovated to house Sporting Life and RH, both of which opened on October 19, 2017. The wing also includes the Uncle Tetsu bakery, a CIBC branch, a relocated Starbucks, Landwer Café, a Johnnie Walker-branded Scottish whisky-tasting pop-up bar operated by the Liquor Control Board of Ontario (LCBO), a Miele appliance showroom, and high-end restaurants. The Rest, which is an upscale mattress store owned by Sleep Country Canada, also opened in this wing.

The Milestones Grill and Bar restaurant, located near Hudson's Bay, was closed in 2016. It was then announced that the American restaurant chain The Cheesecake Factory would open its first Canadian location in the mall. The location was renovated and expanded to accommodate the new restaurant and it opened to the public in November 2017. From its opening until the start of the COVID-19 pandemic, the restaurant experienced wait times of up to three hours.

In 2017, mall owner Oxford Properties submitted an application to the City of Toronto for a block zoning plan to guide future development of the site. In the first phase, new buildings would be constructed along the Dufferin Street frontage, incorporating a boutique hotel, a cinema and new retail, with future phases being built on the north parking lot, to incorporate residential and office uses. In March 2019, the City launched a study on the re-development of the parking lots and other areas of the mall property to improve traffic as well as mixed-use for the site to include residential and retail use. If approved, the re-development would result in parking being moved underground. However, some residents in the neighbourhood are opposed to the development.

=== 2020s ===
On June 26, 2020, the Microsoft Store closed as part of its parent's winding down of the chain. From late 2020 to 2022, Nissan Studio occupied the space that was formerly the Microsoft Store and serves as a showroom for the Japanese automaker's vehicles, not a dealership. In 2023, this space is occupied by Alo Yoga. Hudson's Bay closed in mid-2025 due to bankruptcy.

Most of the stores in the central section of Yorkdale are vacated for renovation since the second half of 2023 and are replaced with luxury retailers.

== Retail mix ==
When first opened, Yorkdale had a large number of clothing retailers along with large department stores in the mix of stores. Yorkdale was the first Canadian mall to include two major department stores: Simpson's and Eaton's, under the same roof. Eaton's went bankrupt in 1999 and its space was redeveloped into a new wing that opened in 2005.

Since the late 1990s onward, Yorkdale's management has focused on attracting luxury brand retailers, especially those selling clothing and accessories, as well as high-end electronics, a strategy also adopted by Sherway Gardens, owned by rival mall operator Cadillac Fairview. These include Versace, Bulgari, Burberry, Cartier, Chanel, Gucci, Prada, Kate Spade, Loewe, Tory Burch, Moncler, Jimmy Choo, Apple, and Bose before Bose closed most physical retail operations, including its Yorkdale location. Yorkdale has also attracted American and international retailers seeking to expand to Canada. Yorkdale bought out the lease of Sears in 2014 to reallocate that space for higher-priced department stores.

Yorkdale owner Oxford Properties places a requirement on each tenant to renovate regularly. When each tenant renews its lease with the mall, they are required to renovate their store.

=== List of anchor stores ===
Name	Area	Year opened	Year closed	Notes
Dominion		1964	Late 1990s	
Eaton's		1964	1999	
Holt Renfrew		1964	—N/a	
Hudson's Bay		1988	1991	Original location
Hudson's Bay		1991	2025	Replaced Simpsons; closed in June 2025
Indigo Books and Music		1999	—N/a	
Nordstrom		2016	2023	
RH		2017	—N/a	Replaced part of Sears Canada
Sears Canada		1991	2013	Replaced the original location of Hudsons Bay
Simpsons		1964	1991	
La Maison Simons		2025	—N/a	Replaced Nordstrom

=== Canadian firsts ===
Yorkdale has been the point of entry into the Canadian market for many widely known international commercial enterprises. Companies that have opened or plan on opening their first Canadian store at Yorkdale include:

Name	Date opened	Notes
AllSaints	April 2013	
Apple Store	May 2005	Relocated to new wing in December 2012
Bath & Body Works	September 2008	
The Cheesecake Factory	November 2017	
Christian Louboutin	November 2013	
Crate & Barrel	2008	
David Yurman	2013	Winter 2013
Furla	October 2019	
GEOX	May 2005	
J.Crew	August 2011	
John Varvatos	November 2013	
Kate Spade New York	November 2012	
Loft	November 2012	
Microsoft Store	November 2012	
Salvatore Ferragamo Italia S.p.A.	July 2013	
Ted Baker	November 2012	
Tesla Motors	November 2012	
True Religion	October 2010	
Tumi	November 2013	
White House Black Market	October 2013	
Zara Home	August 2013	

According to the International Council of Shopping Centers, more than 30 American retailers contacted mall management, wanting to open their first Canadian stores in Yorkdale after Crate & Barrel revealed that their first store outside the United States would open in Yorkdale in 2008.

Yorkdale's Nordstrom was the fourth location in Canada, opening after the locations at the Toronto Eaton Centre, Calgary's Chinook Centre and Ottawa's Rideau Centre. In 2023, Nordstrom announced their exit from the Canadian market, which resulted in the closure of their Yorkdale location, and it was replaced with a Simons in August 2025. Yorkdale's Uniqlo store was the second of its kind in Canada when it opened in late 2016, a month after the first Uniqlo opened at the Toronto Eaton Centre the previous September. Yorkdale's Lego Store is the second one in Canada after the first opened at Fairview Mall.

== Temporary exhibits ==
From 2019 to mid-2023, Yorkdale used otherwise vacant retail space in the centre of the mall for paid-admission temporary exhibits with gift shops. In 2019, this space was used for a replica of Santa's workshop during the holiday season. During 2020 and 2021, this space was used for the Marvel Avengers S.T.A.T.I.O.N. exhibit amid the COVID-19 pandemic in Toronto. In 2022, this space was used for The Friends Experience exhibit. In the first half of 2023, this space was used for The Office Experience exhibit.

== Incidents ==
Two stabbings occurred at the mall in 2008. A security guard was shot in the chest, saved by his kevlar vest, confronting two teenage robbery suspects, intervening in a dispute with the two with another in the parking lot in April 2009. Both suspects were arrested.

In the first half of 2013, two shootings occurred at the mall. The first one took place in the external surface lot late on a Saturday night in March 2013, leaving one man dead and one man injured. In May 2013, a man was injured by shots fired into the Joey restaurant at midnight on a Friday night.

Yorkdale upgraded its security with a new $3.4 million video surveillance system that went into service in March 2014. The new system provides full 360-degree surveillance of the mall and the parking lots. It also includes licence plate recognition technology at parking entrances.

In August 2018, Yorkdale Shopping Centre was shut down after a spate of gun violence erupted at one of three Starbucks locations (since the renovation to Indigo Books and Music during the COVID-19 pandemic in Toronto in the early 2020s, there are two Starbucks locations in Yorkdale). Though nobody was seriously injured, it caused delays on Toronto Transit Commission (TTC) routes as transit vehicles avoided the area.

On August 29, 2021, Yorkdale Shopping Centre went into lockdown following a shooting inside the mall. One suspect was arrested.

On July 17, 2025, during the early morning hours, a man was found dead in the parking lot of the mall following a shooting.

== Gallery ==
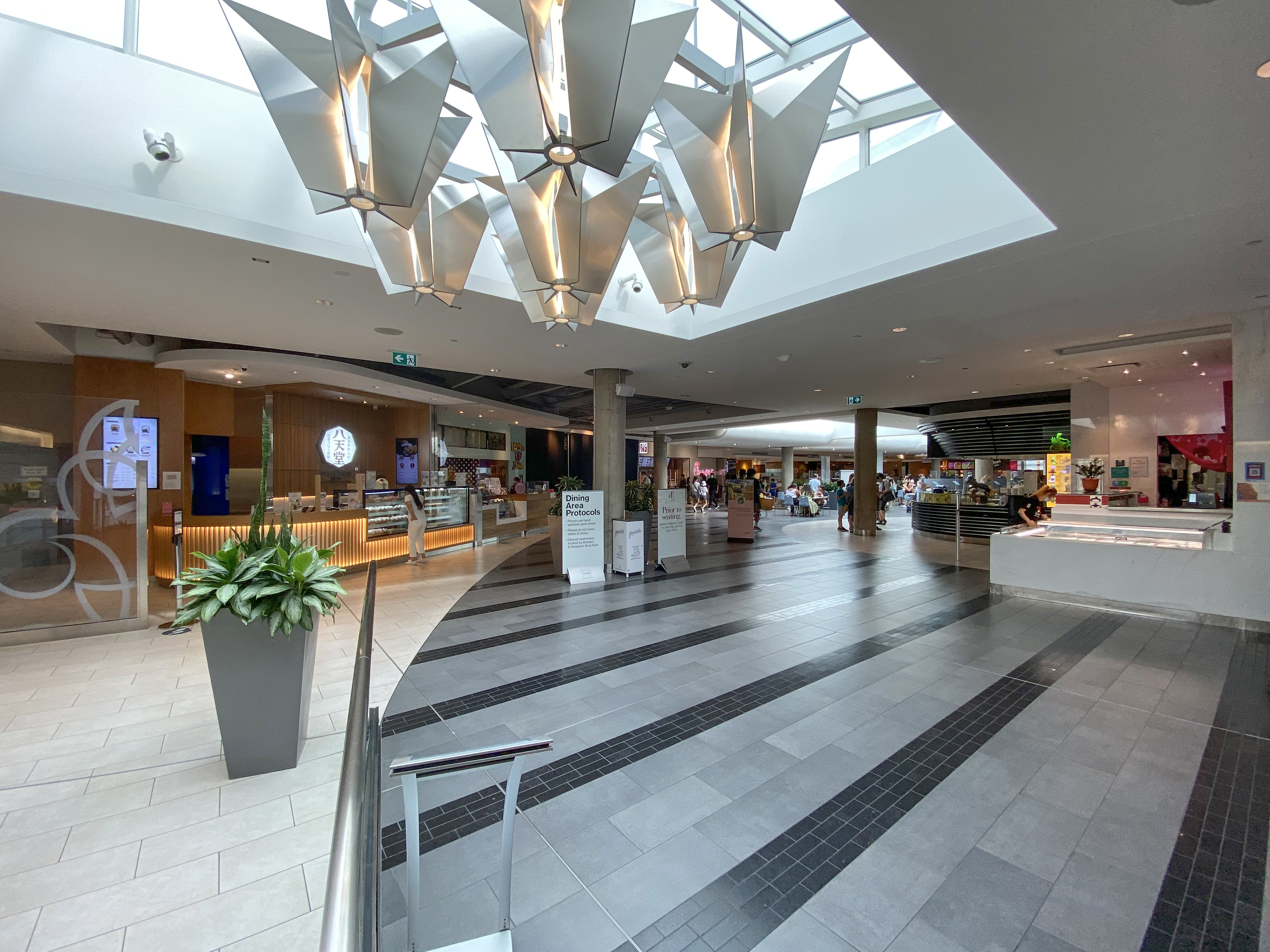
The Dine on 3 food court was opened in 2012 and renovated in 2023

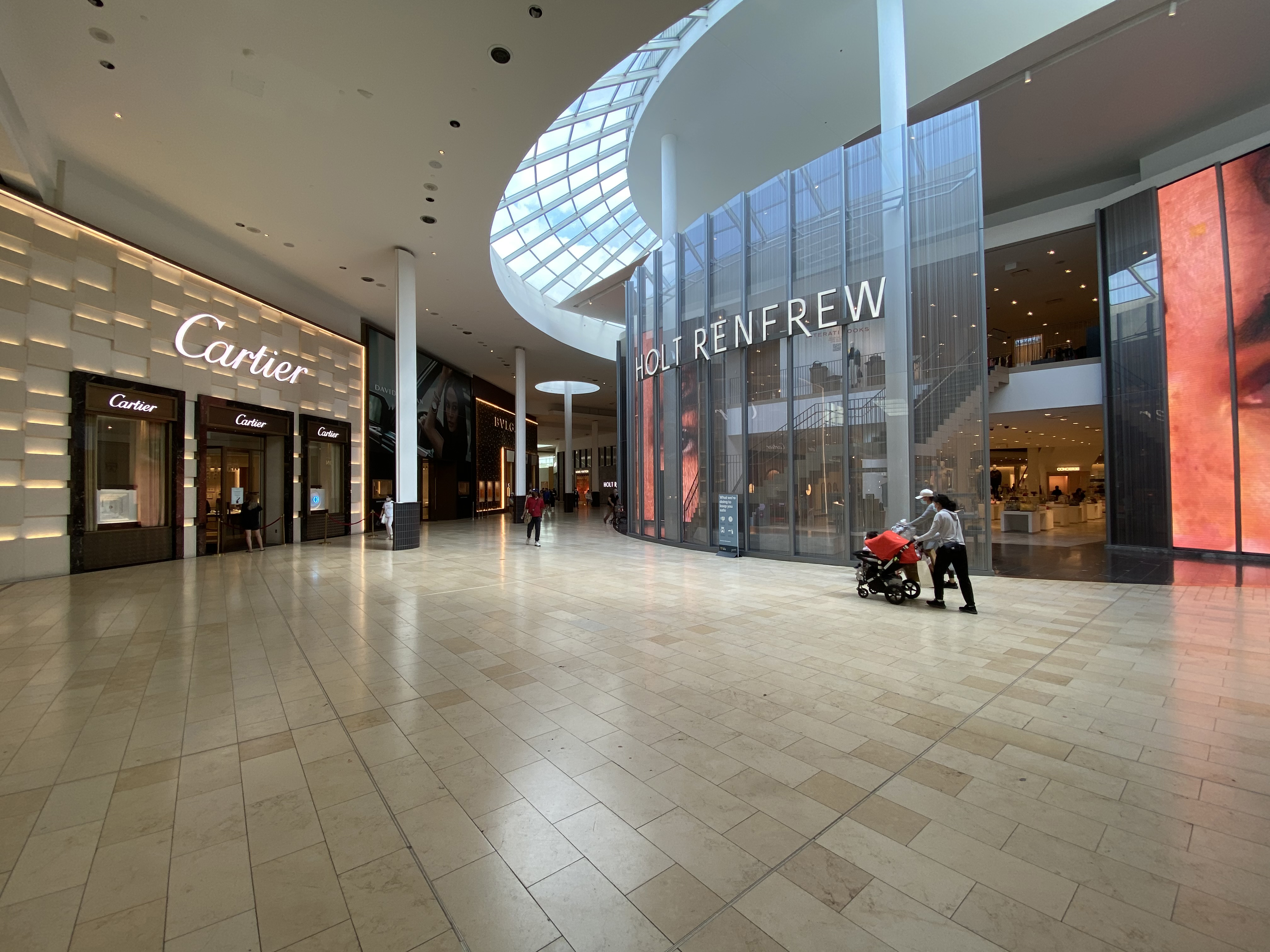
Cartier and Holt Renfrew in Yorkdale

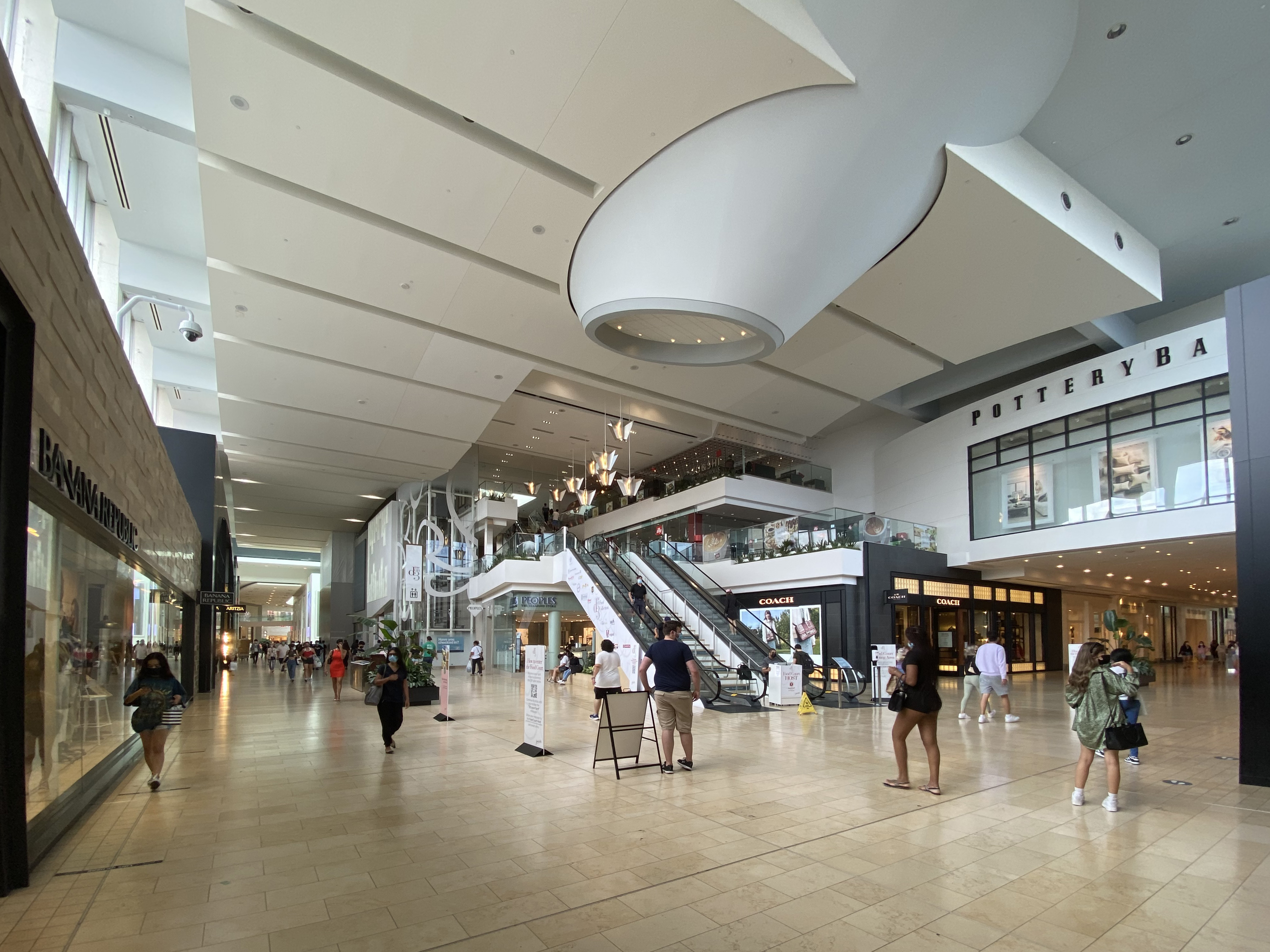
Shops and the entrance to the Dine on 3 food court in Yorkdale in 2021

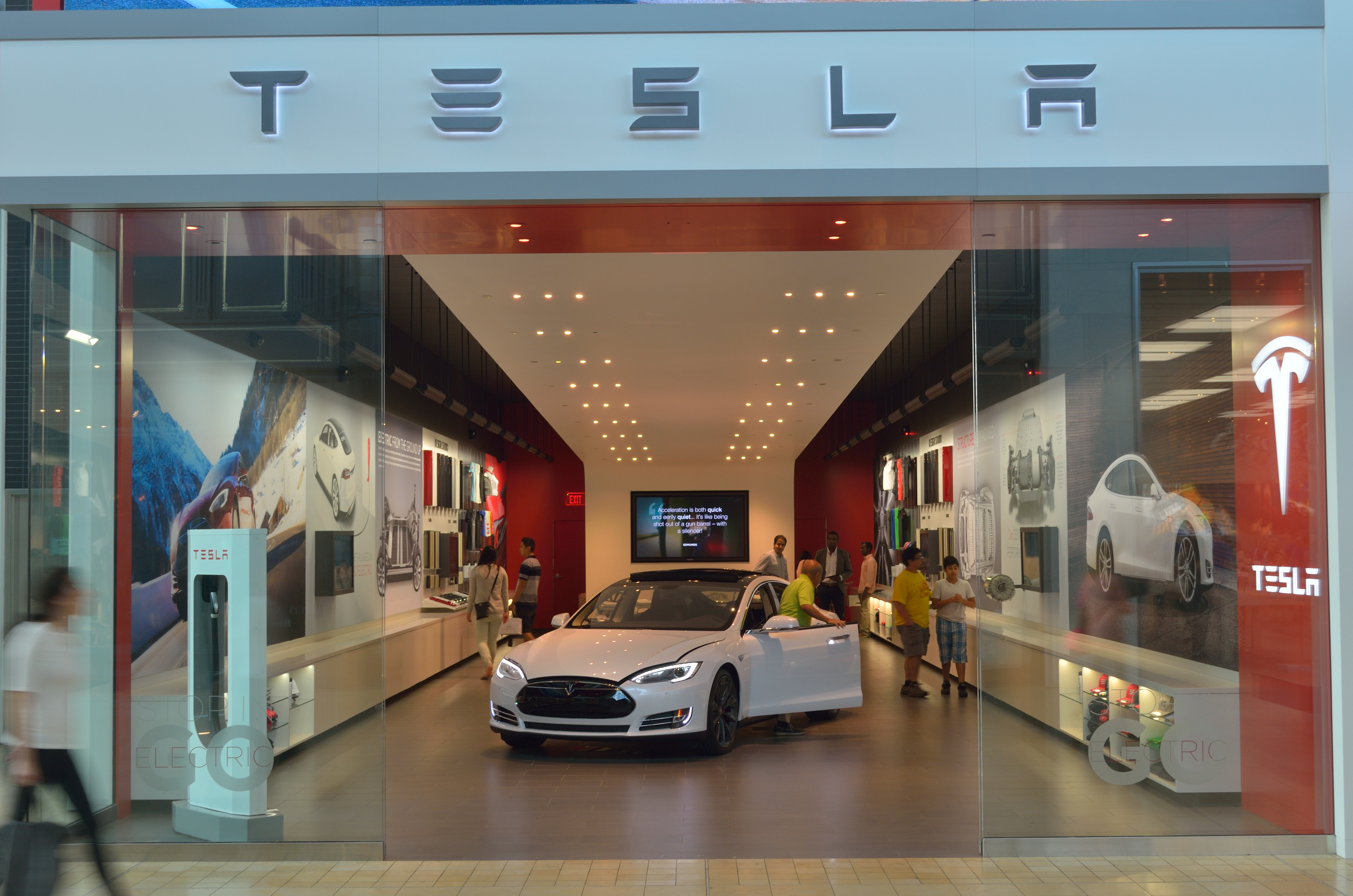
Tesla Motors opened their first store in Canada at Yorkdale. It is not without controversy as local city councillor Mike Colle asked for the termination of the Tesla lease amid the Elon Musk salute controversy in 2025. The mall has been a point of entry into the Canadian market for several international enterprises.

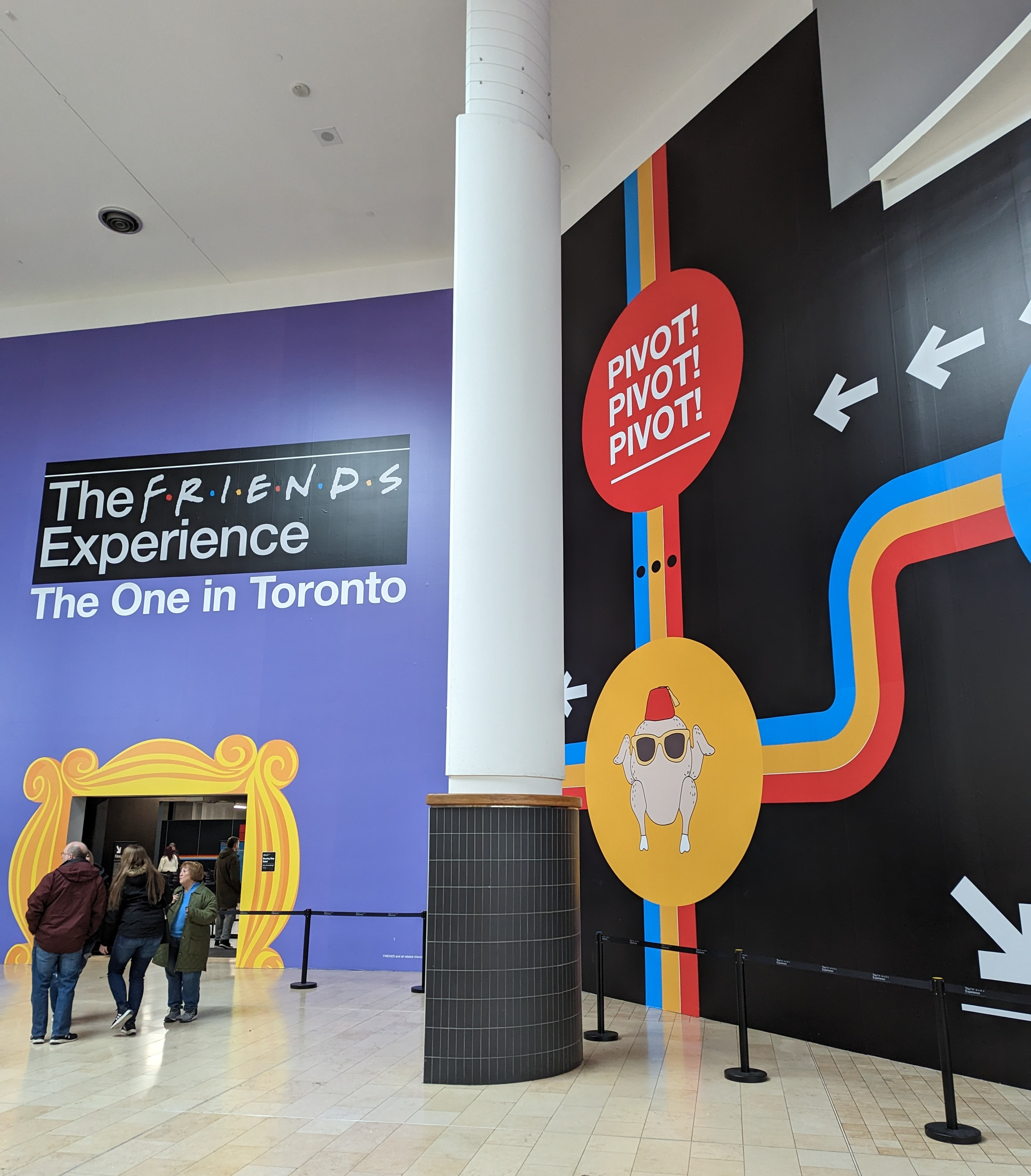
The Friends Experience in Yorkdale Shopping Centre

== See also ==
- List of shopping malls in Canada
- List of shopping malls in Toronto
- List of largest shopping centres in Canada
