= Richmond-Adelaide Centre =

Cluster of Office buildings in Toronto

Coordinates: 43.65012°N 79.38337°W

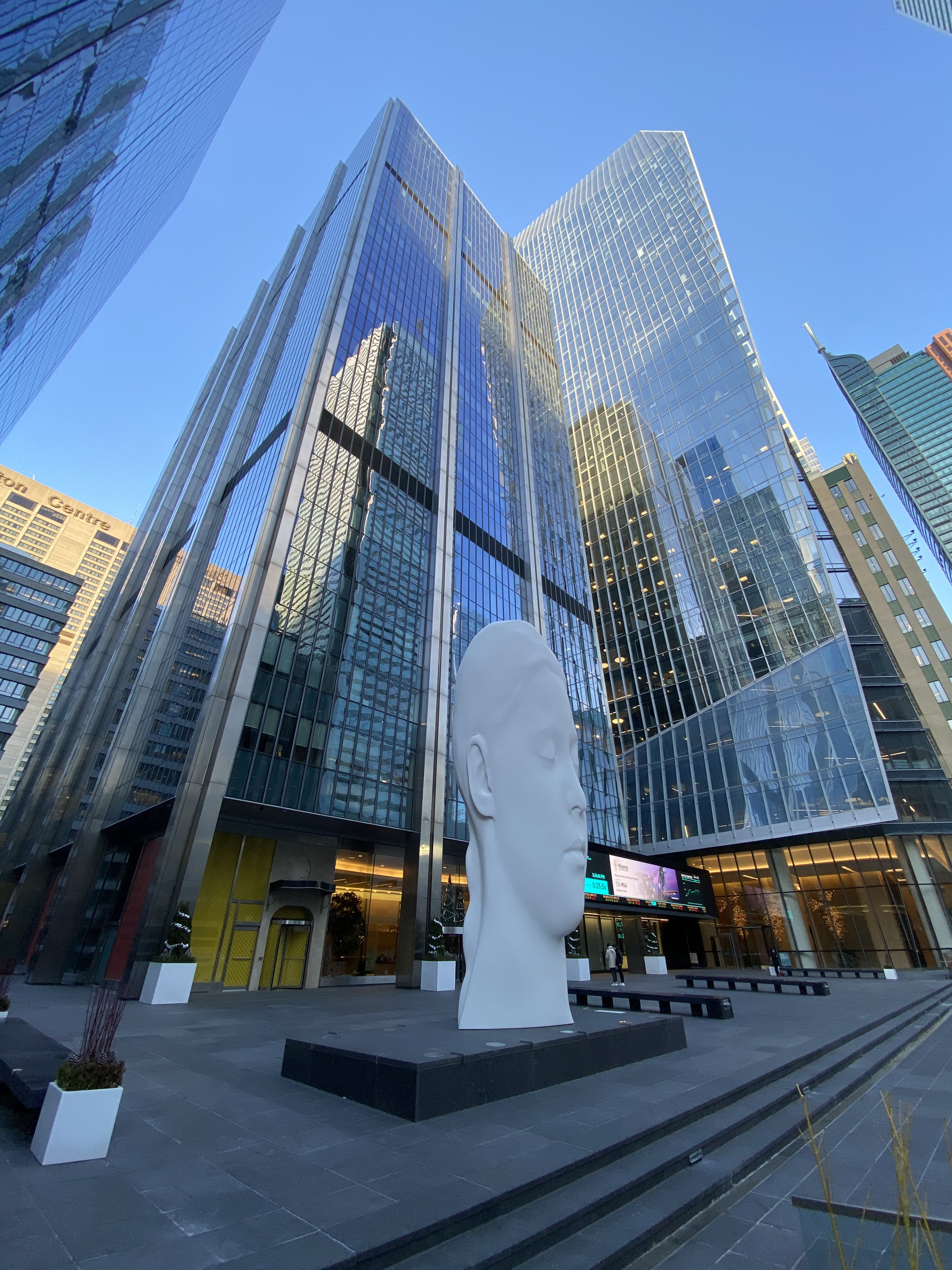
120 Adelaide-Richmond Adelaide Centre

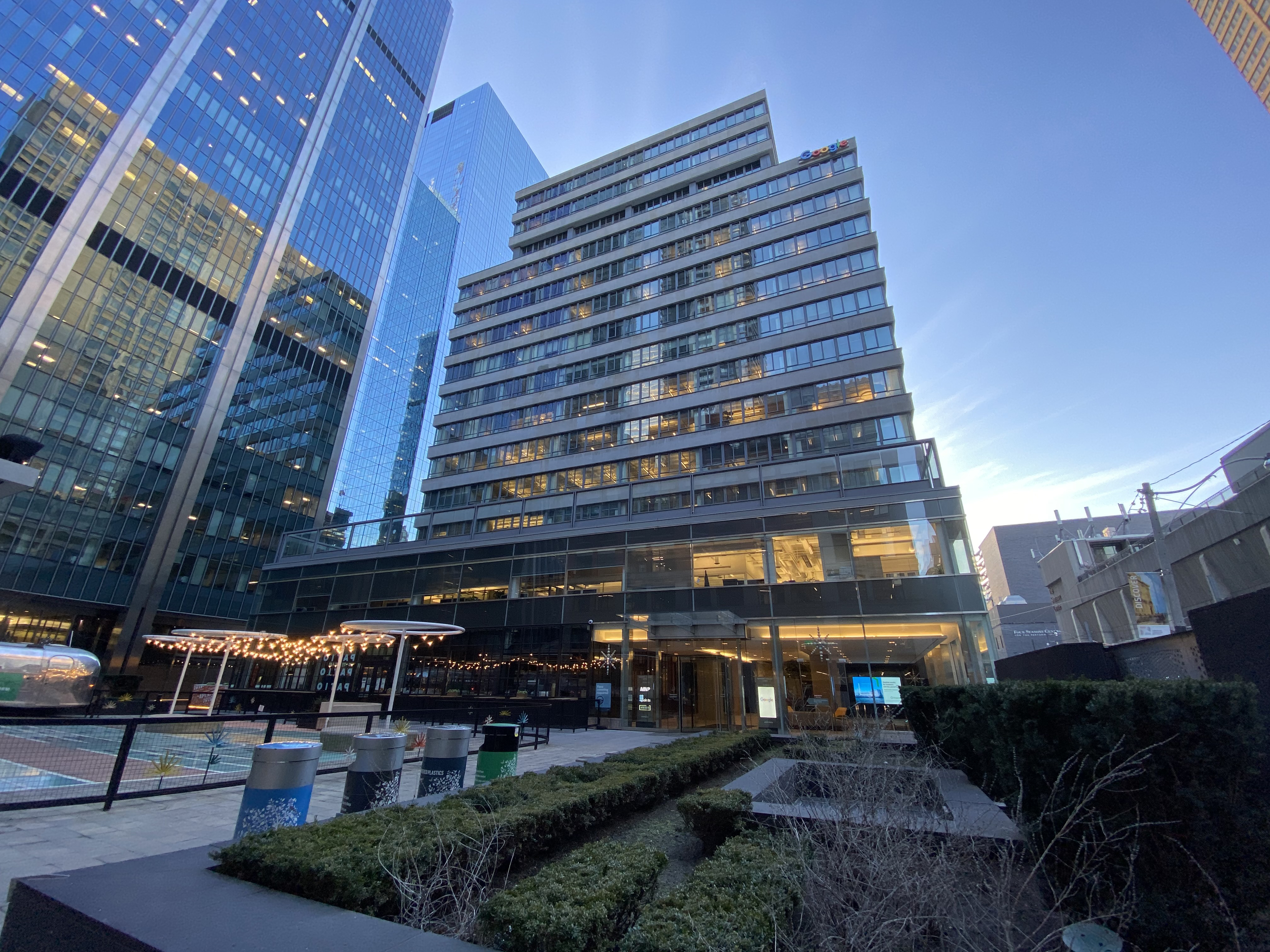
111 Adelaide-Richmond Adelaide Centre

Richmond-Adelaide Centre is a cluster of office buildings in Toronto, Ontario, Canada, located in the financial district. It is bounded by Richmond Street West to the north, Sheppard Street to the east, Adelaide Street West to the south, and finally York Street as its western boundary. The complex is owned and operated by global real estate investor, developer and owner of Oxford Properties Group.

There are multiple buildings located within this block, and its total area is 1.6 million square feet. Completed in 1923, 85 Richmond St West (also known as "The Federal Building") is the oldest building in the complex. The Concourse Building (100 Adelaide St West) was built in 1928. In 1956, 111 Richmond Street West was completed. 120 Adelaide St West, located in the core of the block was built in 1966. The Oxford Tower is the most recent building, completed in 1978.

The majority of the buildings located within this block are part of the PATH system.

The centre is a core asset for Oxford Properties, which undertook a CA$65 million renovation of 111 Richmond Street West in 2010, a building designed by architect Peter Dickinson. There have also been plans to redevelop 100 Adelaide St W. and build a new office building retaining part of the existing heritage structure.

The centre’s urban retail concourse and food court have undergone an extensive modernization including a new 400-seat food court in a redesigned, contemporary space, as well as the expansion and relocation of its retail area. With over 40,000 square feet of retail space, the centre’s concourse is frequented by area residents, tourists and over 5,200 employees in the office towers directly connected to the complex.

== Public Art ==
In 2020 a large sculpture, Dreaming by Jaume Plensa, was unveiled in the courtyard by Oxford Properties.

== Links ==
- Case Study - Richmond-Adelaide Centre
- Oxford Properties - Office Leasing Website & Building Stats
- Youtube Clip - 111 Richmond SW
