= Oxford Properties =

Canadian multinational corporation

Oxford Properties Group

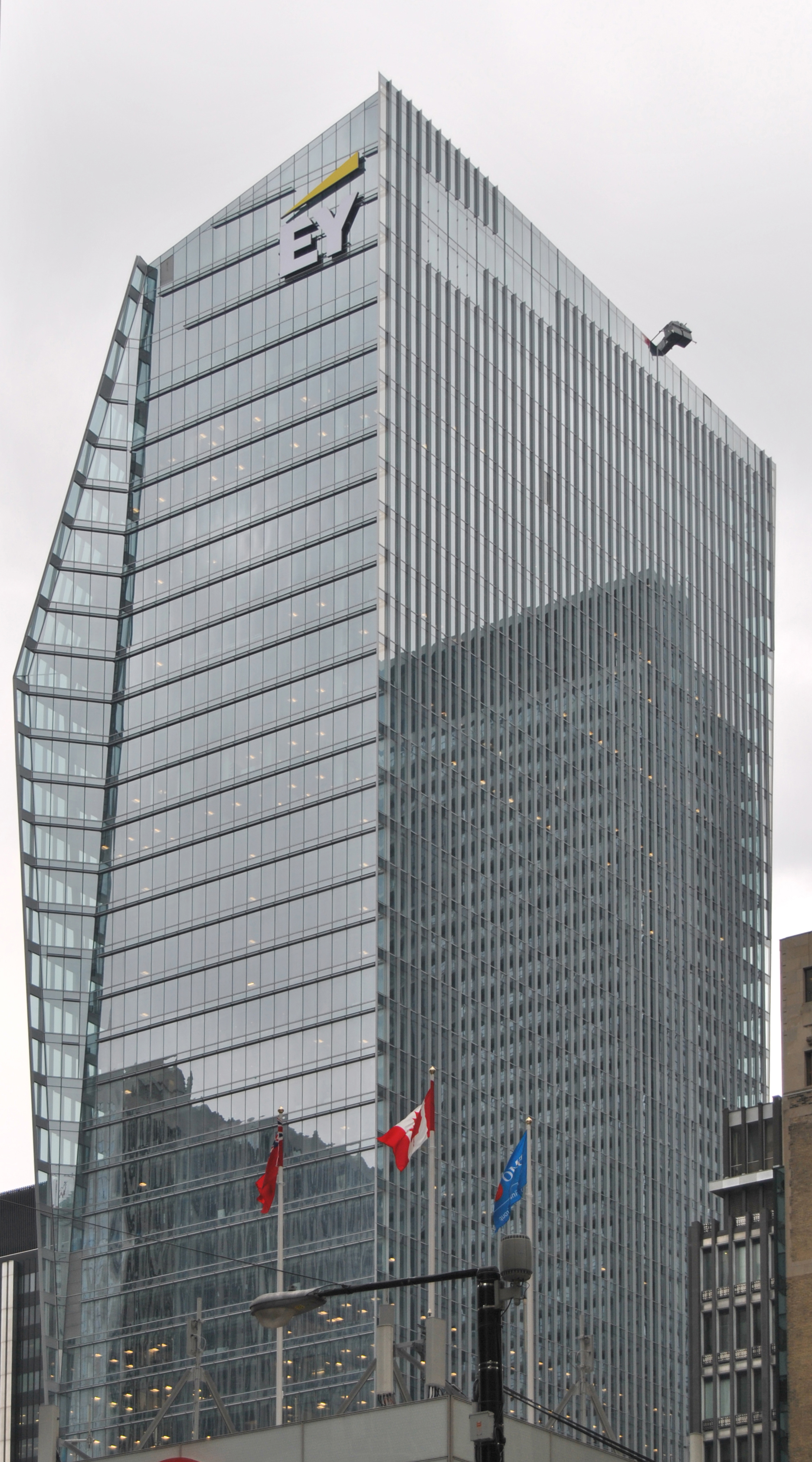
- Headquarters at EY Tower
- Type: Private
- Industry: Real estate
- Founded: 1960; 66 years ago
- Headquarters: EY Tower, Toronto, Ontario, Canada
- Area served: Canada; United States; United Kingdom; Australia
- Key people: Daniel Fournier (Executive Chair); Eric Plesman (President & CEO)
- Products: Office; Industrial; Retail; Residential; Life Sciences; Hotel
- Services: Land development Property management Asset management Investment
- AUM: CA$87 billion (June 2023)
- Owner: OMERS
- Number of employees: 1,300+
- Website: oxfordproperties.com

Oxford Properties is a Canadian multinational corporation, with operations in real estate investment, development and property management. Its portfolio includes office, retail, industrial, multi-residential, life sciences and hotel assets. Established privately in 1960 and later wholly owned by the Ontario Municipal Employees Retirement System (OMERS) since 2003, the company is headquartered in Toronto with regional head offices in New York City, London, Australia, Singapore and Luxembourg. The organization has 2,000+ employees and approximately C$70 billion of assets that it manages for itself and on behalf of its investment partners. Oxford's owned portfolio represents more than 150 million square feet in key cities and high-growth hubs. Some of its most notable properties include Hudson Yards, Yorkdale Shopping Centre, Fairmont Banff Springs Hotel, Olympic Tower and The Center Potsdamer Platz (formerly the Sony Center). Oxford also owns a portfolio of luxury hotels in Canada as well as rental residential units in Canada and the US.

Oxford Properties has several significant development projects currently underway in New York City, London, Sydney, Vancouver and Toronto.

== Corporate history ==
Oxford Leaseholds was established in 1960 in Edmonton by Don Love, and John and George Poole, founders of PCL Construction. Don Love had arrived in Edmonton in 1955 as a stockbroker working for a national securities firm. A physician client approached him about building a medical clinic in Edmonton, asking if he knew of any potential investors. He knew E.E. Poole, another one of his clients, and when Love made the proposal, Ernest Poole declined but suggested that his sons John and George might have some interest. The three started a new company called "POLO" – "PO" for Poole, and "LO" for Love. John and George provided the capital. The trio secured a mortgage and built the Baker Clinic, which they then sold back to the doctors of the practice. A decade later, a new ownership structure was introduced, as Oxford went private in 1980 in a management-led leveraged buyout. To pay for the deal, it sold its shopping centres. The decade did not pass quietly however, with assets rising above $3 billion. Oxford Properties set up its headquarters in Toronto's Richmond-Adelaide Centre and sold its U.S. business to BCE Development Corp. Next, the company split into two separate companies: Oxford Properties Canada Ltd. put the company's real estate back in public hands, and Oxford Development Group remained private and managed all of the company's real estate.

In 1988, the two companies merged and once again went public, with help from a $60 million investment from a Hong Kong investor. The company made significant real estate investments, buying entire portfolios from Marathon, Greiner-Pacaud, Hammerson Canada, Royal Bank of Canada and Canderel Group. In 2001, the company became wholly owned by the Ontario Municipal Employees Retirement System - a member of the Maple-8.

== Environmental and social responsibility ==
Oxford Properties ranked first in Sustainability in North America in the Diversified Retail/Office Category by GRESB survey for the fourth year in a row in 2016. GRESB is an industry-driven organization committed to assessing the ESG performance of real assets globally, including real estate portfolios and infrastructure assets. As of Spring 2021, Oxford Properties has:

- Reduced its portfolio carbon intensity by 35% since 2015;
- Completed the development of 260,000 sf of rooftop solar across its portfolio—representing 26% of its stated 1M sf commitment;
- Expanded its global carbon data & analytics platform across 96% of its portfolio, enabling it to create and track hourly energy and carbon targets;
- Been recognized in the energy category of Fast Company's annual list of the World's Most Innovative Companies for its energy and carbon reduction efforts;
- Seen its property RBC WaterPark Place become the first LEED Core and Shell Platinum Office Tower in Toronto.

== Property gallery ==
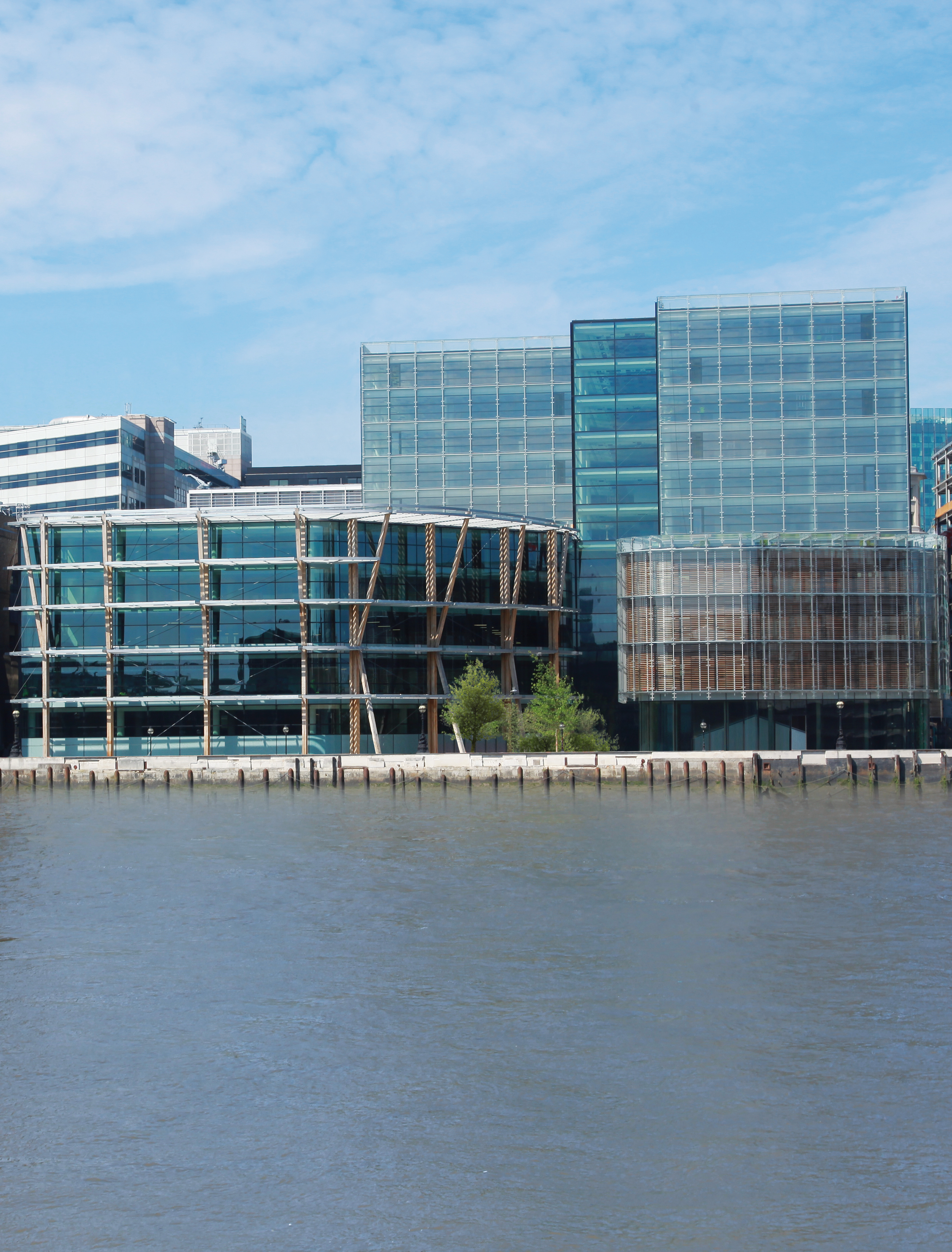
Watermark Place, London, UK

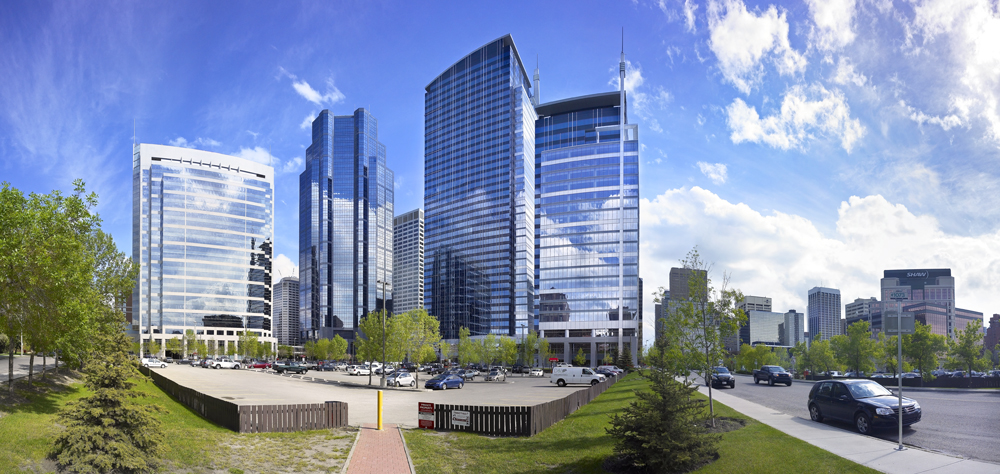
Centennial Place, Calgary

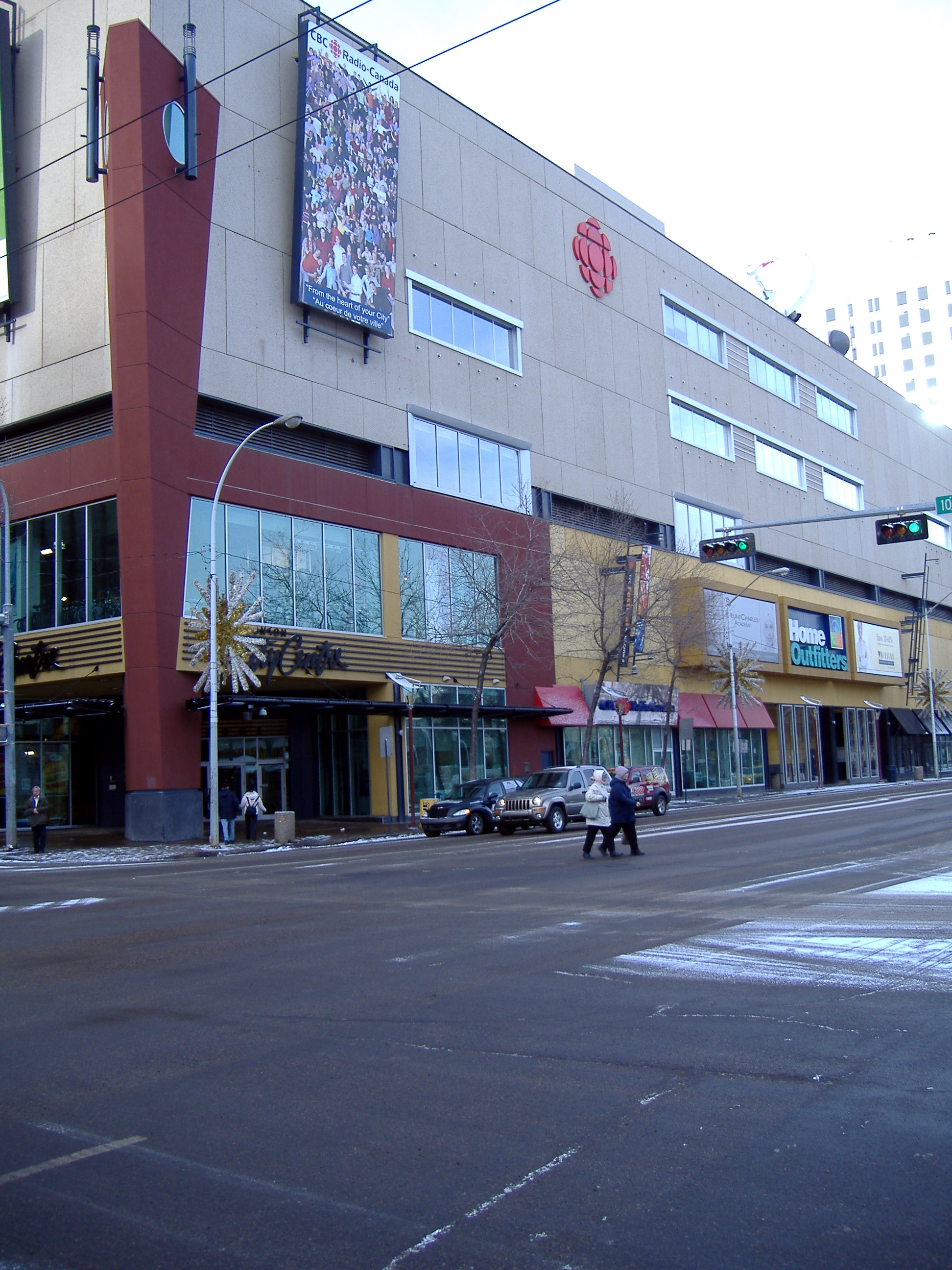
Edmonton City Centre Edmonton

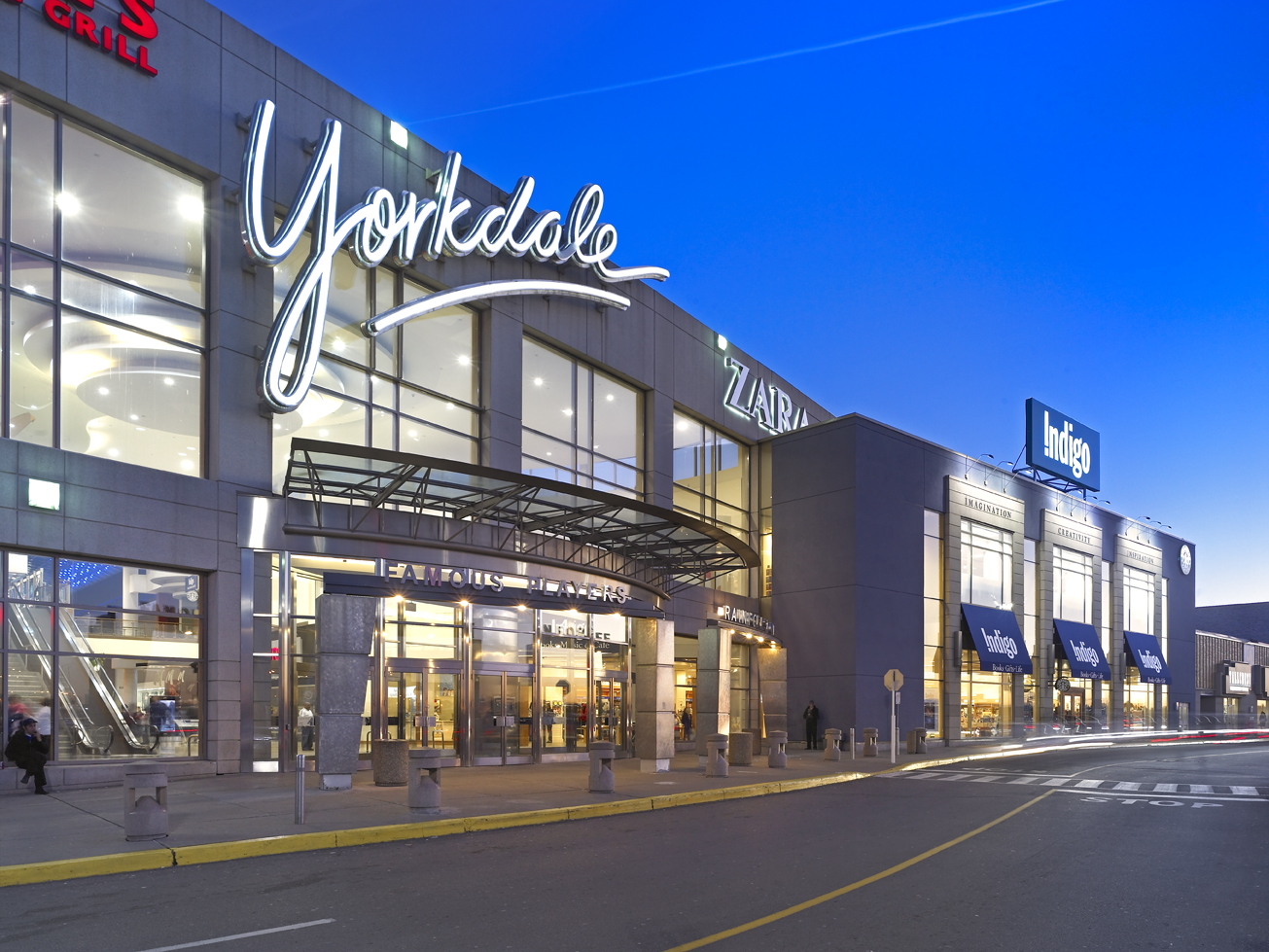
Yorkdale Shopping Centre, Toronto

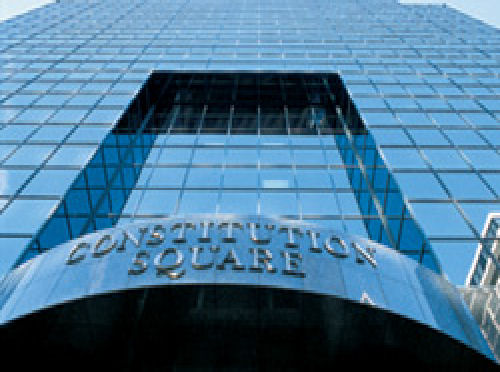
Constitution Square, Ottawa

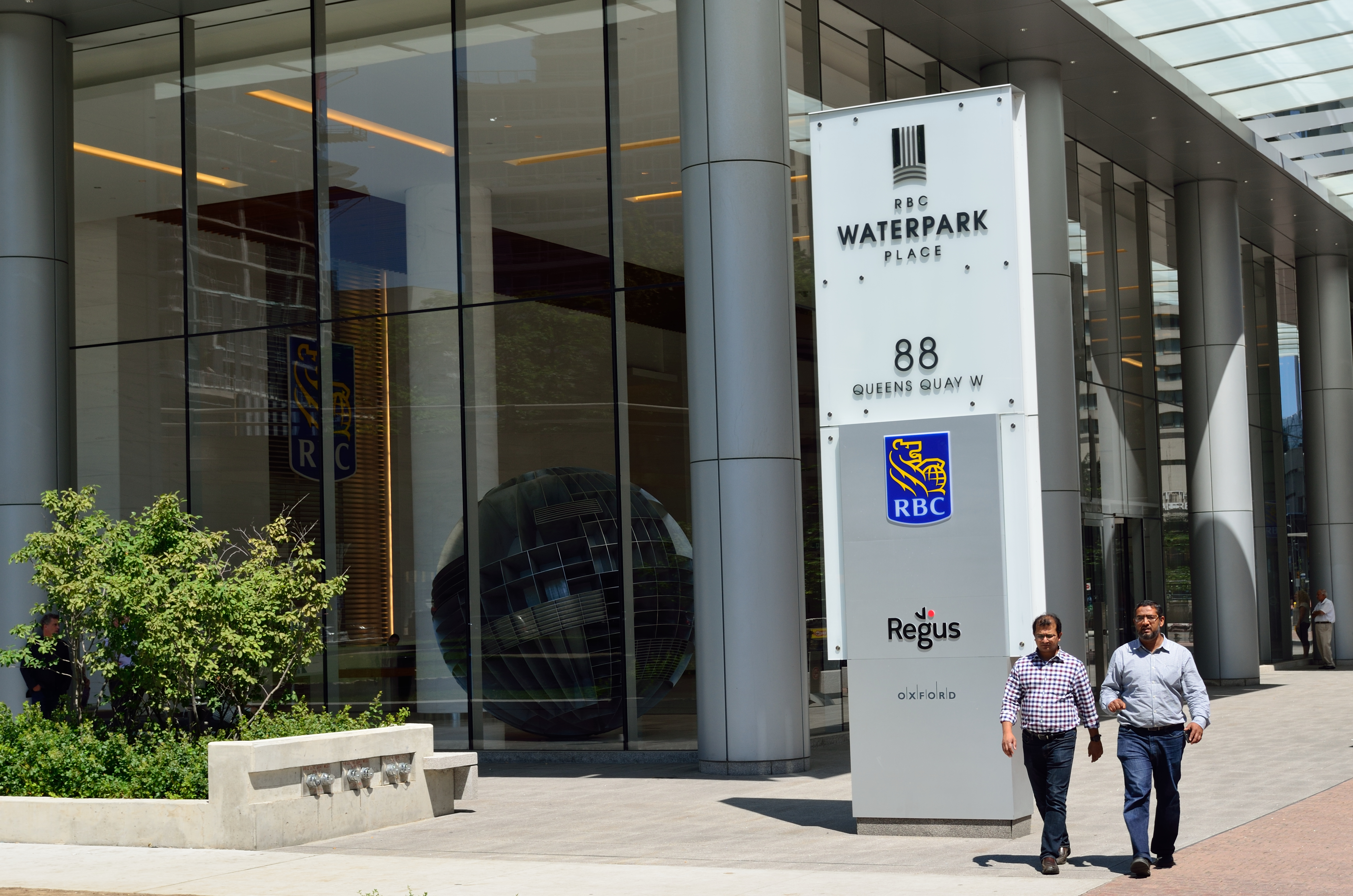
RBC WaterPark Place, Toronto
