= CTA =

CTA or cta may refer to:

== Legislation ==
- Children's Television Act, American legislation passed in 1990 that enforces a certain degree of educational television
- Corporate Transparency Act, Title LXIV of the National Defense Authorization Act for Fiscal Year 2021
- Counter-Terrorism Act 2008
- Criminal Tribes Act, British legislation in India passed in 1871 which labelled entire communities as criminal

== Organizations ==
=== Asia ===
- Central Tibetan Administration
- China Tourism Academy
- Chinese Taoist Association
- Crystal Thai Airlines

=== Europe, Africa, and South America ===
- Brazilian Department of Aerospace Science and Technology (CTA; Portuguese: Departamento de Ciência e Tecnologia Aeroespacial; DCTA), Brazilian Air Force
- Cairo Transportation Authority
- Central de los Trabajadores Argentinos
- Central African Republic national football team (FIFA code CTA)
- Cyprus Turkish Airlines
- Technical Centre for Agricultural and Rural Cooperation ACP-EU (CTA)
- CTA International

=== North America ===
- California Teachers Association, a labor union
- California Technology Agency, a California cabinet-level state agency
- Call to Action, a Christian organization
- Canadian Transportation Agency, an independent tribunal of the Government of Canada
- Canadian Trucking Alliance, a Canadian federation of provincial trucking associations
- Central Toronto Academy, formerly called Central Commerce Collegiate
- Chicago Transit Authority, the official public transportation authority for the city of Chicago
- Chisholm Trail Academy
- Colorado Translators Association
- Columbus Torah Academy
- Consolidated Tape Association, oversees stock market transactions in the United States
- Craig Tribal Association, federally recognized Native American tribe in Alasaka
- Consumer Technology Association, formerly Consumer Electronics Association

== Places ==
- Central African Republic (FIFA code: CTA)
- Catania-Fontanarossa Airport (IATA code)
- Central Texas Airport
- Citayam railway station (station code)

== Professions ==
- Chartered tax adviser, a tax accountant who is a member of the:
  - Chartered Institute of Taxation (UK)
  - Tax Institute (Australia)
- Commodity trading advisor
- Cryptologic technician administrative

== Science ==
- Cellulose triacetate
- Chain transfer agent
- Charge transfer amplifier
- Cherenkov Telescope Array, a project to build a system of very high energy gamma ray telescopes.
- The medical jargon "Clear to auscultation", for lungs are clear when listening; see List of medical abbreviations: C
- Computed tomography angiography
- Conditioned taste aversion
- Constant temperature anemometry
- CTA, a codon for the amino acid Leucine

== Other ==
- Call to action (marketing), a web design tenet that requires each page to clearly indicate the desired user response
- Call to action (political), a call to activists to participate in a direct action or similar political activity
- Call to arms
- Cased telescoped ammunition
- Central technical area, an equipment room used in broadcasting facilities
- The Chicago Transit Authority, former name of the American band Chicago
- Container Terminal Altenwerder
- Common Tasks for Assessment, an educational programme run by the Department of Education of South Africa
- Common Travel Area, comprising Ireland, Great Britain, the Isle of Man and the Channel Islands
- Common Turkic Alphabet
- Control area, controlled airspace that exists in the vicinity of an airport
- Cold temperature airport, airports requiring special adjustments to their instrument approaches during cold weather
- Copyright transfer agreement, used in publishing

== See also ==
- Chicago Transit Authority (disambiguation)
- CTAS (disambiguation)
