= Ideal Lofts =

Soft loft condominium apartment building in Toronto, Ontario, Canada

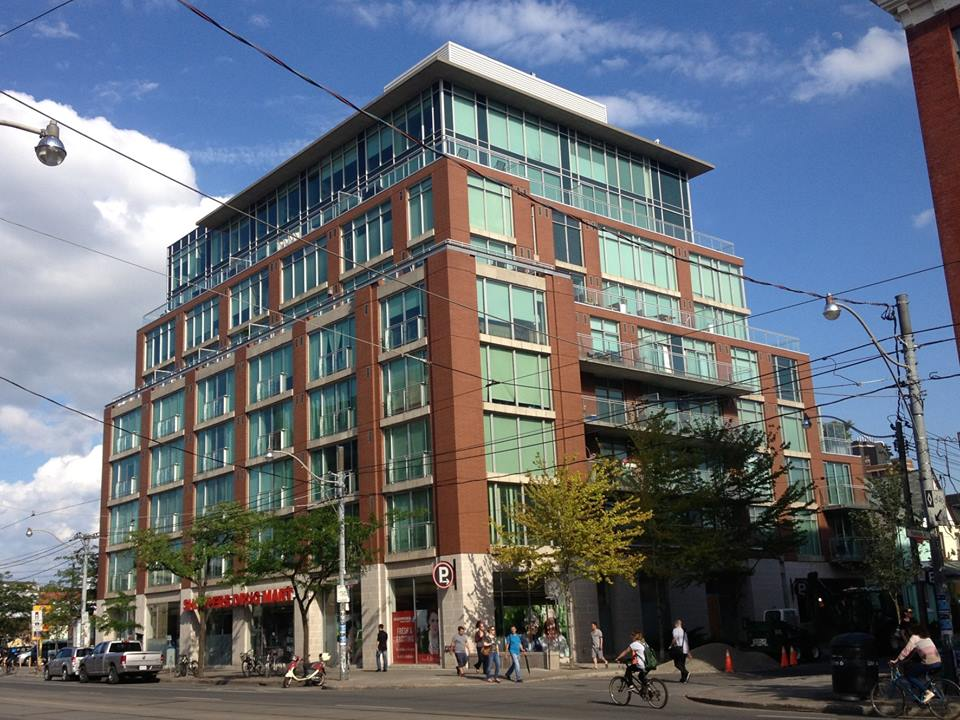

General information
- Type: Residential/ Condo
- Architectural style: Postmodern
- Town or city: Toronto, Ontario
- Country: Canada
- Coordinates: 43.6558°N 79.4085°W
- Completed: 2002
- Cost: $9 million
- Client: Context Development
- Owner: Toronto Standard Condominium Corporation TSCC 1455
- Height: 31 m

Technical details
- Floor count: 9
- Lifts/elevators: 2

Design and construction
- Architect(s): architectsAlliance
- Structural engineer: Read Jones Christoffersen Ltd.
- Services engineer: ENSO Systems Ltd

Other information
- Parking: Underground

Website
- ideallofts.wordpress.com

Ideal Lofts is an architecturally noted low-rise soft loft condominium apartment building in Toronto, Ontario, Canada. It is located at Markham Street and College Street in the downtown neighbourhoods of Little Italy and Trinity–Bellwoods. The project was developed by Context and designed by Peter Clewes, Prishram Jain and Robert Cadeau of architectsAlliance. Cecconi Simone and Crayon Design designed the interiors. The building was registered on August 19, 2002.

== Description ==
The building's design received an "honourable mention" at the City of Toronto’s Architecture and Urban Design Awards 2003. One judge noted that "it's a very impressive example of the Toronto urban loft-housing model." According to a multiple award-winning City of Toronto study the building is a good precedent of a context-sensitive and well-massed mid-rise building. It is respectful of the neighbourhood houses along Markham Street to the south. The massing, materials, and façade of the building take their cue from three neighbouring 19th-century warehouse buildings each with a strong red brick base. The three buildings are: 474 Bathurst St, Pedlar People Building at 473-489 College St, and the Ladies Wear Building at 559 College St. The City of Ottawa Design and Planning Guidelines also refer Ideal Lofts. According to Robert Freedman, architect and then director of urban design for the City of Toronto, Ideal Lofts is part of a trend toward better-designed condos in Toronto. The name Ideal Lofts comes from the Ideal Restaurant Supply store which previously stood on the site.

The nine-story brick and precast concrete condo has 68 units from one-bedroom studios to three-bedroom penthouses. Dimension range from: 1 bedroom: 514–700 ft^{2}, 1+1 bedroom: 700–800 ft^{2}, 2 bedroom: 800–1300 ft^{2}, and penthouse: 1260–2232 ft^{2}. The units per floor each have different layouts. All have floor-to-ceiling windows. The sixth and eighth floors are two-story lofts with glass and concrete terraces. Many units have permanent, unobstructed views of residential streets lined with houses. South-facing units overlook neighbouring back gardens beyond the grasses and trees on the condo's lower green roof and a section of Lake Ontario is still in view for many. To the west and north, the view takes in treetops and heritage buildings. The units facing either south or west have terraces or balconies. The lofts facing north have juliet balconies. The few amenities include a meeting/party room, indoor parking and storage.

== See also ==
- SP!RE
- Tip Top Tailors Building
