= CTAS =

CTAS may refer to:

== Medicine ==
- Canadian Triage and Acuity Scale
- Compulsive Tool Acquisition Syndrome, also known as Gear Acquisition Syndrome

== Military ==
- case telescoped ammunition system, a type of telescoped ammunition
  - Case Telescoped Armament System, a product of CTA International

== Other uses ==
- Cintas (stock ticker: CTAS), U.S. safety and cleaning equipment company
- Data Definition Language: Create Table as Select

== See also ==
- CTA (disambiguation), for the singular of CTAs
