= Markham Street, Toronto =

Street in Toronto, Ontario, Canada

Coordinates: 43.656742°N 79.409135°W

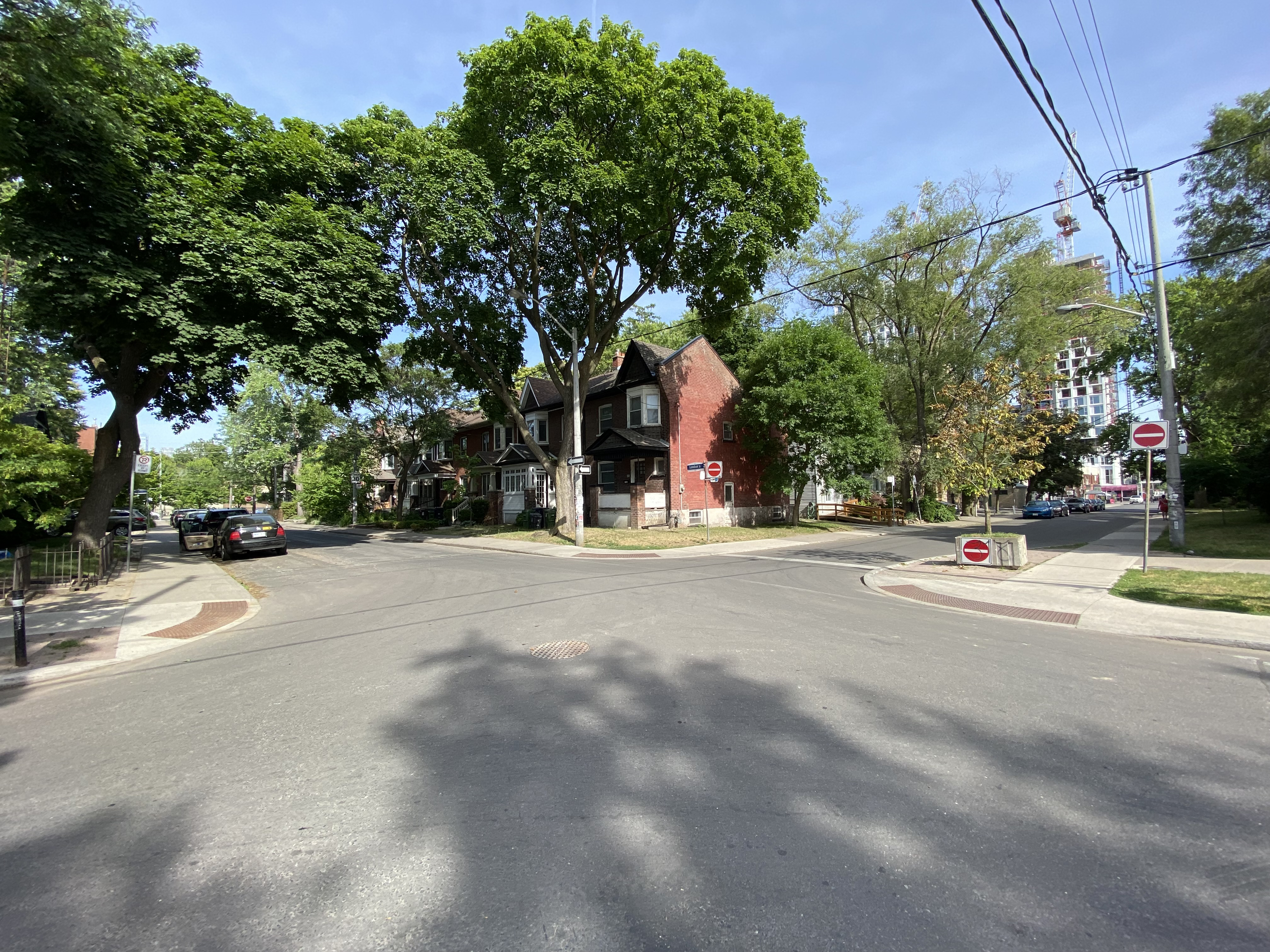
Markham Street at London Street

Markham Street is a north–south residential street located in the city of Toronto, Ontario, Canada, one block west of Bathurst Street. Its northern end starts in the Seaton Village neighbourhood and it passes through Mirvish Village, Palmerston–Little Italy, Trinity–Bellwoods and ends at West Queen Street West at its south end.

== Character ==
Markham Street intersects with several neighbourhoods consisting mainly of residential side streets full of semi-detached homes, mostly built in the early 20th century. The major cross streets Bloor Street, Harbord Street, College Street, Dundas Street and Queen Street run east–west, are mainly commercial in nature and are two to four-lane arterial roads. To the east is Bathurst Street, running north–south, another four-lane arterial road with mostly residences along both sides. To the west is north–south Palmerston Boulevard.

=== Trinity–Bellwoods ===
House numbering on Markham Street begins at Queen Street West. Walking north into the Trinity–Bellwoods neighbourhood from Queen to Herrick Street, it is a two-lane street with traffic one-way down from north to south. The street is residential on both sides consisting of mainly of two-storey semi-detached or row houses north to College Street. Very few houses look alike. Many homes have Victorian or Edwardian architectural styles. At Dundas, the intersection meets two-story buildings with restaurants and a brewery.

=== Palmerston–Little Italy ===
At College, the street enters Palmerston–Little Italy under an intimate canopy of mature trees lining the road. The intersection has two multi-storey commercial buildings and two mainly residential buildings. The former warehouse Pedlar People Building at 473-489 College Street has many offices and board gaming restaurant/bar Snakes and Lattes on the south west corner. On the south-east corner is Ideal Lofts condominium which contains a Shoppers Drug Mart. On the north-west corner at 474 College Street is a brutalist medical centre building. On the east is Lunsky Optometry, established in 1933. North of College, are two-storey homes, although further to the north, the homes are larger, and some are three storeys tall and Edwardian in vintage. North of Harbord Street, the homes continue in their eclectic mix of styles, generally three storeys, and semi-detached. North of Herrick Street, the traffic is one-way from south to north, part of the "traffic maze" in the neighbourhood implemented to reduce traffic flows through the neighbourhood.

=== Mirvish Village ===
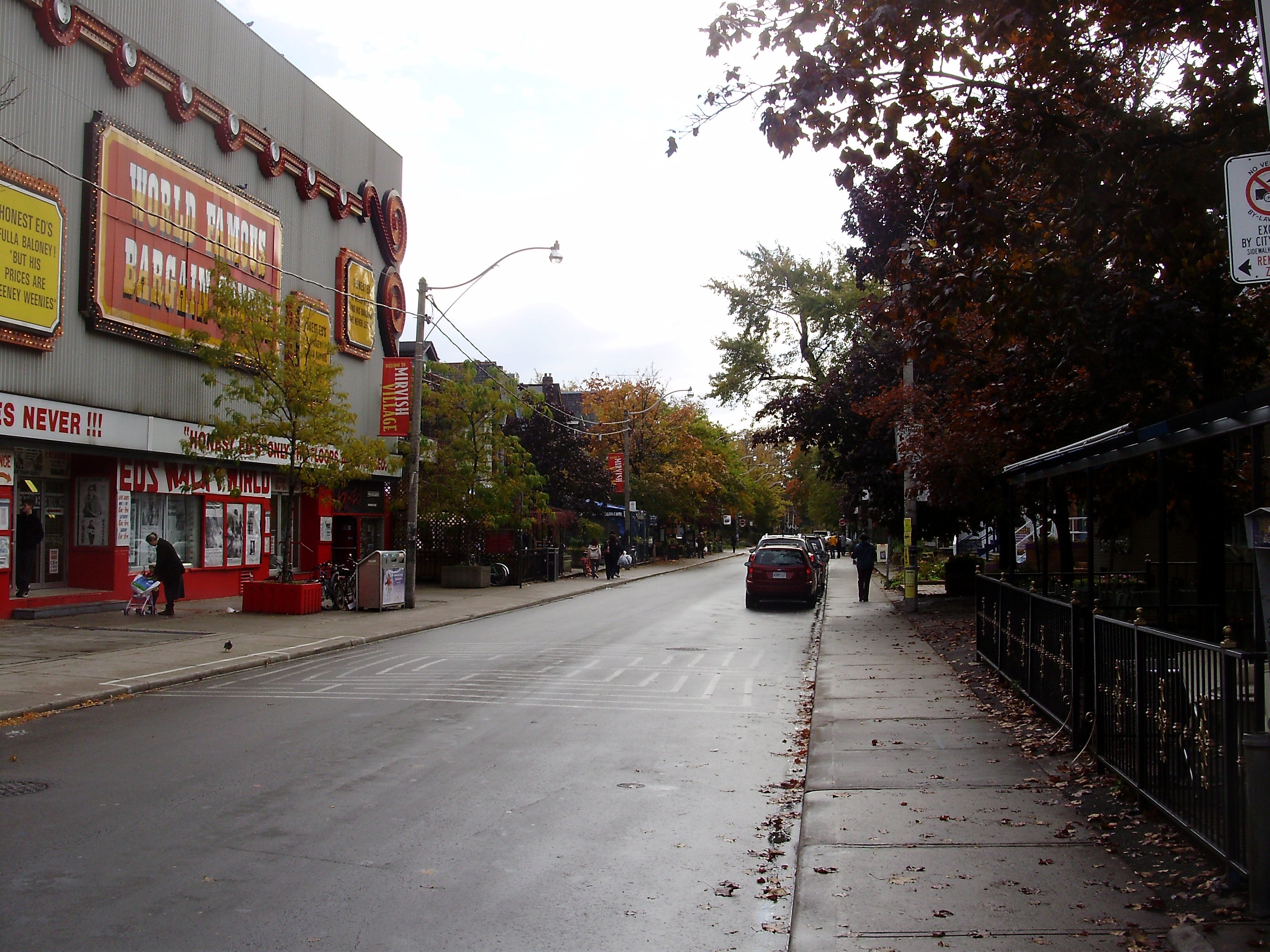
The former Honest Ed's and Victorian homes in Mirvish Village

Mirvish Village is a commercial enclave on Markham Street that runs one block south of Bloor Street. It has changed radically since 2018. Five apartment towers and a parkette are now under construction by Westbank Corp. Along this stretch, former homes that were once converted to art-related uses, retail, or restaurants have been demolished with facades preserved. Also gone is the Toronto landmark Honest Ed's department store which owned the former homes. The business dominated the Bloor St intersection from Markham Street to Bathurst Street from 1948 to 2016.

In March 2015, developer Westbank Properties, which had bought the Mirvish Village and Honest Ed's properties in 2013 announced their plans for the area. Markham Street from Bloor to Lennox Street would become a "pedestrian-friendly" street with restricted vehicular access. The roadway would be replaced with paving from paving stones, with added trees and expanded room for patios. Fourteen of the existing former homes along Markham would be retained, with new buildings at Bloor Street. Immediately west on Bloor Street is Koreatown.

=== Seaton Village ===
North of Bloor, the street enters Seaton Village and intersects with the Bathurst (TTC) subway station's west entrance and a municipal parking lot atop the subway on the west side. Further north on the east side is St. Peter's Roman Catholic Church and its associated buildings which dominate the block to London Street. Traffic is one-way north along this block, and it is one-way south along the rest of its length. On the next block north is the old St. Peter Catholic Elementary School which is still used by Monsignor Fraser College on the full length of the west side. It is a modernist two-storey structure with brick facade like the neighbourhood. The homes along this stretch are typically two-storey semi-detached. North of Barton, the west side of the street is dominated by the 38 Barton Street apartment building, which is three and a half storeys in height (its first floor is elevated a half floor to give light to basement apartments). The street ends one block north at Folis Avenue.

== Landmarks ==
- Bathurst (TTC)
- Honest Ed's
- Mirvish Village
- Little Italy, Toronto
- Ideal Lofts
- Trinity–Bellwoods
- West Queen Street West

== Political Electoral Districts ==
Municipal: Ward 19. Provincial: Trinity-Spadina. Federal: University—Rosedale.
