= Palmerston-Little Italy =

- Neighbourhood
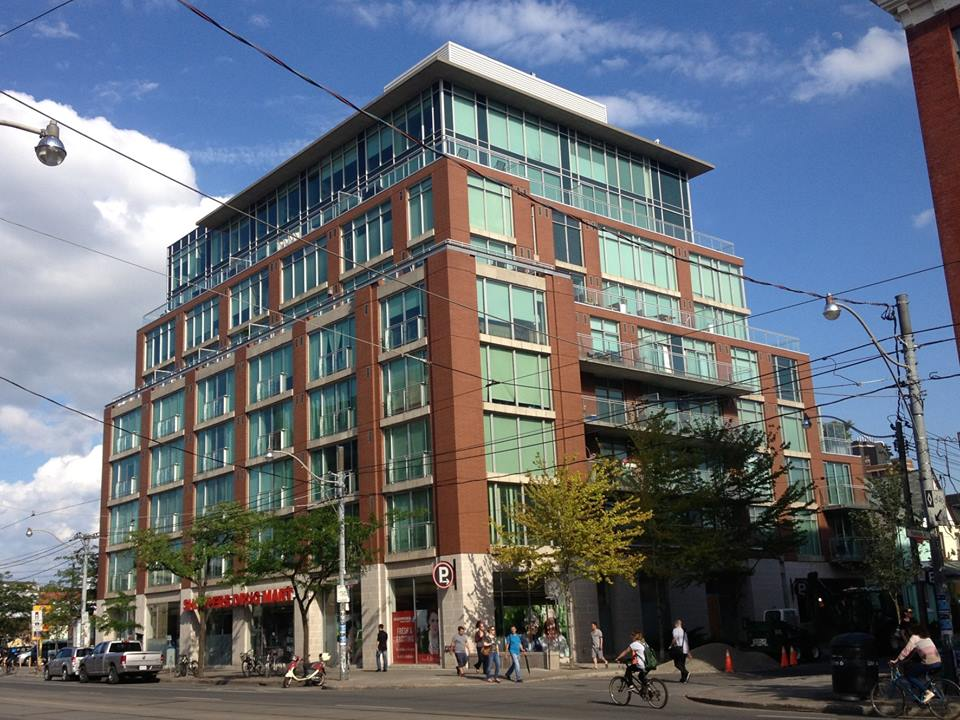
- Ideal Lofts apartments in Palmerston-Little Italy

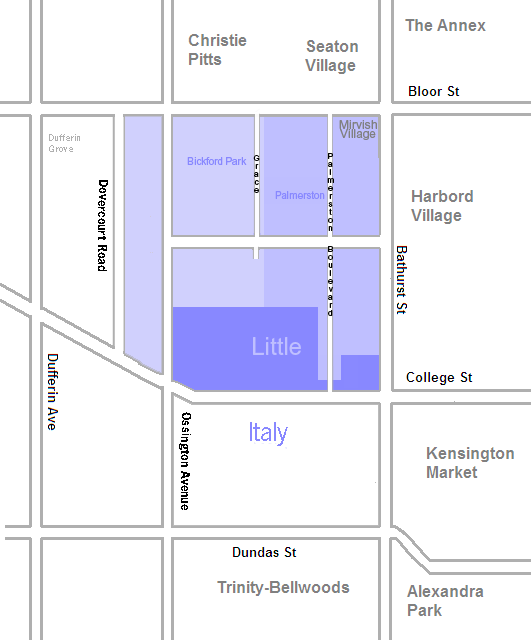
- The areas of Palmerston-Little Italy. Boundaries are approximate.

- Location within Toronto
- Coordinates: 43°39′30″N 79°25′00″W
- Country: Canada
- Province: Ontario
- City: Toronto

Population (2021)
  - Total: 13,120
  - Density: 9,601/km^{2} (24,870/sq mi)

Palmerston-Little Italy is a neighbourhood in central Toronto, Ontario, Canada. Its boundaries, according to the City of Toronto, are by Bathurst Street to the east, Bloor Street to the north, Dovercourt Road to the west and College Street to the south. It is a mature downtown neighbourhood. Within this official neighbourhood of the City of Toronto are two neighbourhoods, Palmerston and Little Italy and the commercial enclave of Mirvish Village.

== History ==
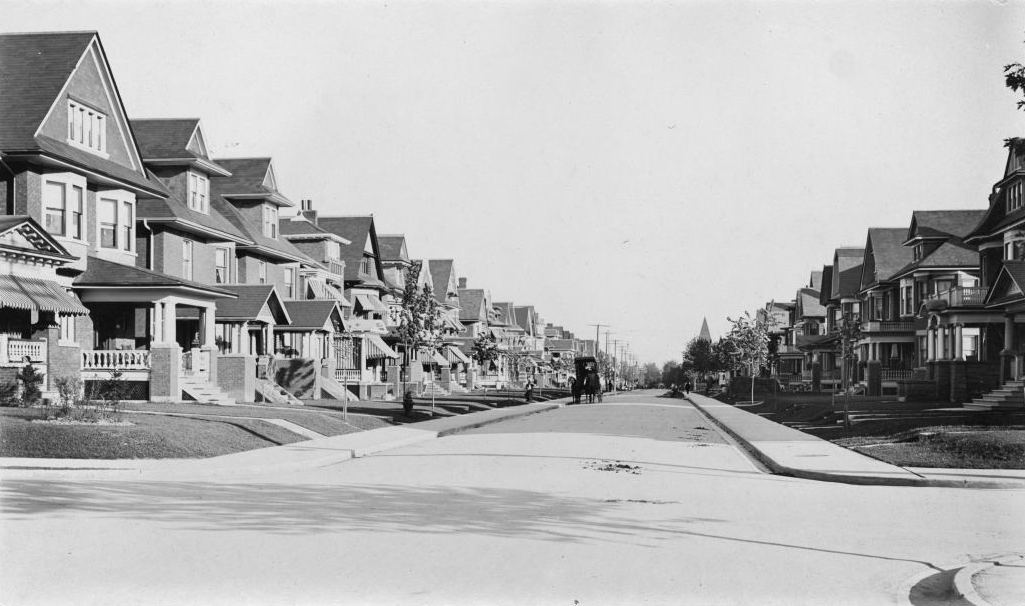
View of Palmerston Boulevard south of Harbord Street, c. 1909. The homes in the area were largely from the Victorian-era.

In the 1950s and 1960s, the Ontario provincial and Metropolitan Toronto governments proposed running a six-lane north–south expressway to the east of Grace Street. This was an extension of Highway 400 and would have gone from a proposed Crosstown Expressway in the vicinity of Davenport and Dupont, south to the Gardiner Expressway. In the 1960s, opposition to the Spadina, Crosstown and Christie expressway projects led the then City of Toronto to oppose the Christie and Crosstown projects. After the cancellation of the Spadina Expressway by the province, the Crosstown and Christie expressway projects were abandoned as well. Son to Italian immigrants, Johnny Lombardi founded one of the first multilingual radio stations in Canada, CHIN in 1966, in Palmerston–Little Italy.

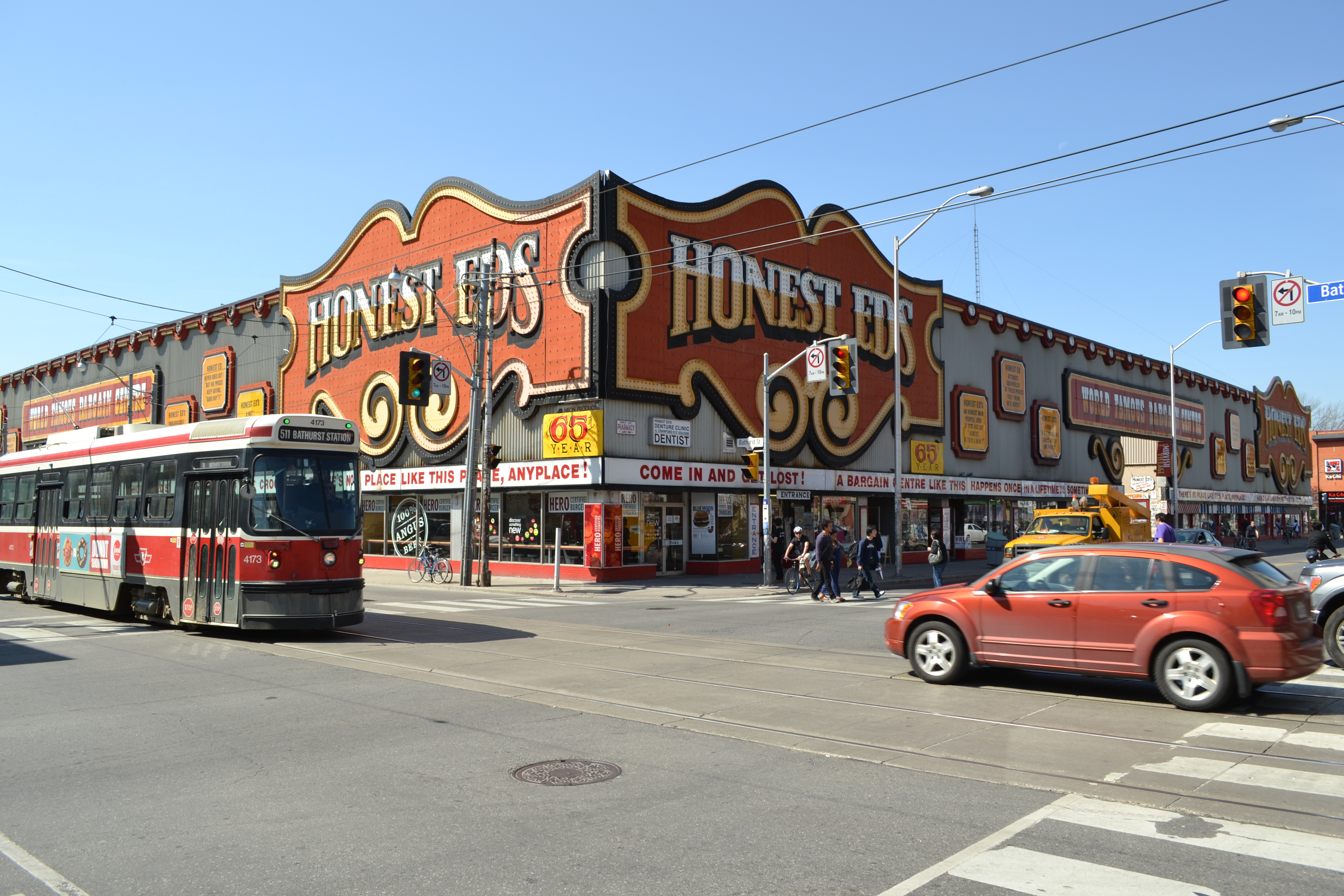
Honest Ed's from Bathurst and Bloor Street, two major roads that run along the neighbourhood's boundaries.

The neighbourhood is primarily residential, consisting mainly of residential side streets full of semi-detached homes, mostly built in the early 20th century.

The major streets are Bloor Street to the north, running east–west, a four-lane arterial road commercial in nature. Bloor Street has many commercial storefronts and businesses. To the east is Bathurst Street, running north–south, another four-lane arterial road with mostly residences along both sides. Running east–west is Harbord Street, a four-lane arterial road with a mix of residences and commercial storefronts and restaurants. Also running east–west is College Street a four-lane arterial road with a vibrant commercial strip named Little Italy, one of the original ethnically Italian districts of Toronto. To the west, north–south streets include Ossington Avenue, a four-lane arterial road, mainly residential and Dovercourt Road, a four-lane road, entirely residential.

== Demographics ==
Total population (2021): 13,120

Major ethnic populations (2021):

- 75.7% White; 17.0% English, 16.6% Irish, 15.1% Scottish, 11.7% Italian, 8.4% German, 8.1% Portuguese, 7.3% Canadians
- 3.2% Black
- 2.9% South Asian
- 2.2% Latin American (of any race)

Total population (2016): 13,826

Major ethnic populations (2016):

- 78.2% White; 22.5% English, 19.8% Irish, 18.3% Scottish, 17.5% Canadians, 11.7% Italian, 10.3% German, 10.0% Portuguese
- 2.4% Black
- 2.8% South Asian
- 1.7% Latin American (of any race)

Total population (2011): 13,746

Major ethnic populations (2011):

- 77.0% White; 20.1% English, 17.0% Irish, 15.4% Scottish, 13.5% Canadians, 13.0% Portuguese, 11.2% Italian
- 2.9% Black
- 2.6% South Asian
- 1.9% Latin American (of any race)

Total population (2006): 13,745

Major ethnic populations (2006):

- 75.7% White; 17.4% English, 14.3% Irish, 13.1% Scottish, 15.5% Italian, 12.7% Canadians, 13.1% Portuguese, 7.9% German
- 3.2% Latin American (of any race)
- 2.7% South Asian
- 2.6% Black

Total population (2001): 14,740

Major ethnic populations (2001):

- 77.1% White; 17.6% Portuguese, 16.3% English, 16.2% Canadians, 14.3% Italian, 12.3% Irish, 11.6% Scottish, 10.3% German
- 2.8% Black
- 2.8% South Asian
- 1.7% Latin American (of any race)

== Landmarks ==
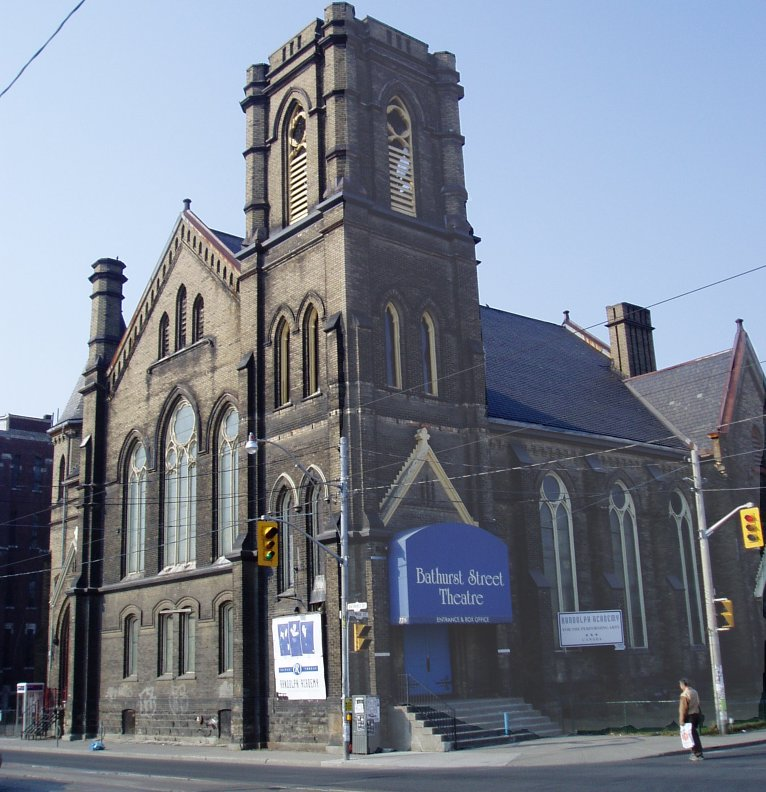
Bathurst Street Theatre is a notable landmark in the neighbourhood.

Notable landmarks in the neighbourhood include:

- Honest Ed's (closed 2016)
- Bathurst Street Theatre
- Harbord Street Bridge

== Mirvish Village ==
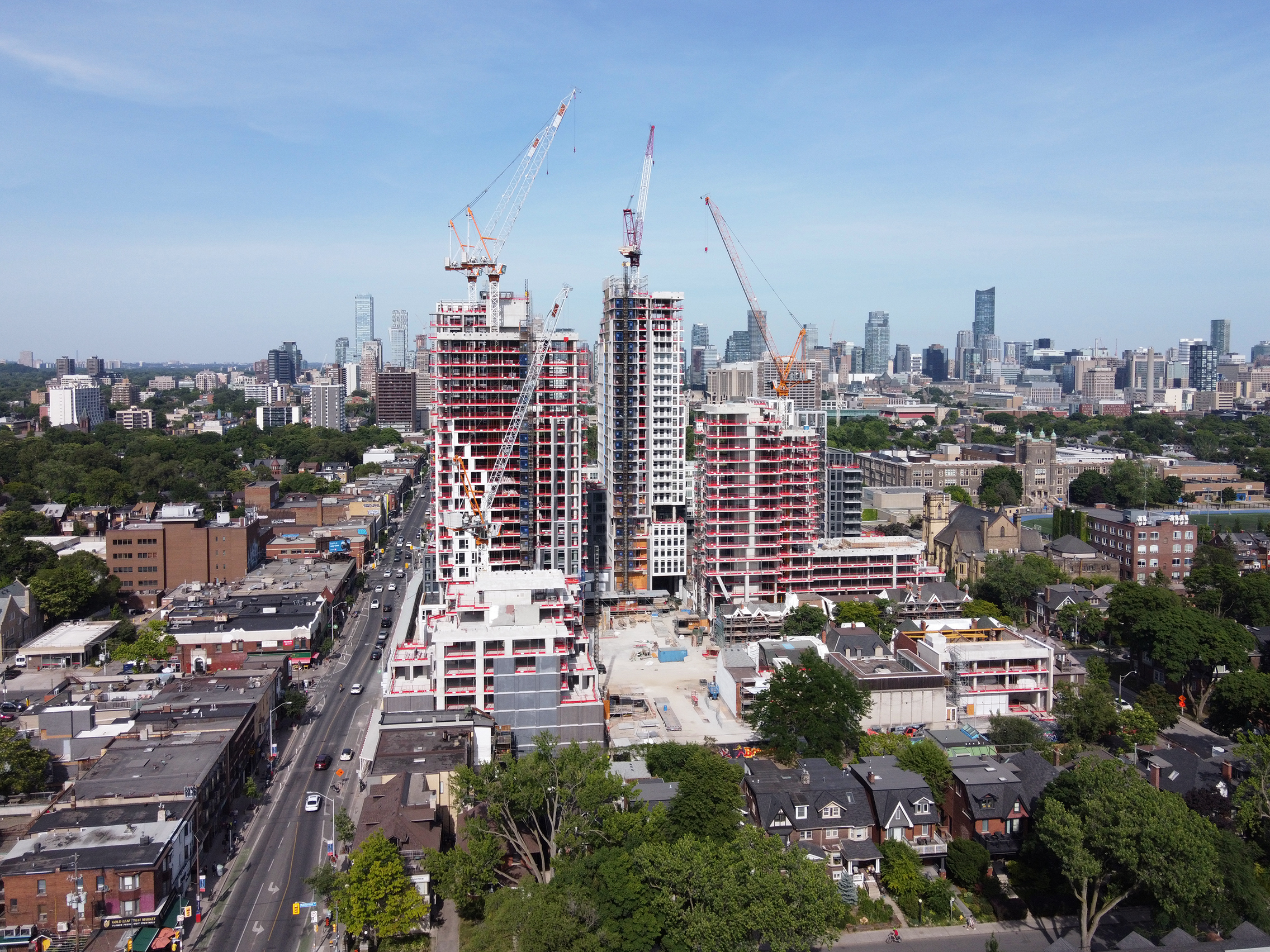
Mirvish Village construction site in Summer, 2022

Mirvish Village is a commercial enclave on Markham Street, which is one block west of Bathurst Street, and encompasses the two sides of the street and back alleys for one block south of Bloor Street. The entire city block on each side is currently undergoing a major transformation.

The area that makes up Mirvish Village is made up of a series of former Victorian homes on Markham Street which housed independently owned shops, art studios, cafes, bookstores, boutiques and galleries. Between 1959 and 1963, Ed Mirvish of Honest Ed's bought up the east side of the block, immediately south of his store, with the intention of tearing down the houses and building a customer parking lot. Toronto's municipal government refused to issue a building permit; therefore, Mirvish converted the buildings into art studios and galleries with the help of his wife, Anne, a sculptor. Later, he purchased the houses on the other side of the street. His son owned the David Mirvish Gallery, which opened in 1963 as one of Mirvish Village's first shops and which continued for 15 years; along with David Mirvish Books which continued for several more years.

A new chapter began with the Honest Ed's / Mirvish Village Proposed Redevelopment project, designed by Vancouver Architect Gregory Henriquez is scheduled to complete construction in 2023. 23 buildings are considered heritage and will be preserved and renovated inside. The retail storefronts will remain small and varied. The heritage buildings on the east side will have both affordable and market rental apartment buildings behind them. A pedestrian marketplace and “Honest Ed’s Alley” are proposed on the east side and a park and daycare will be included on the west side. Honest Ed's was demolished in 2016.

== Education ==
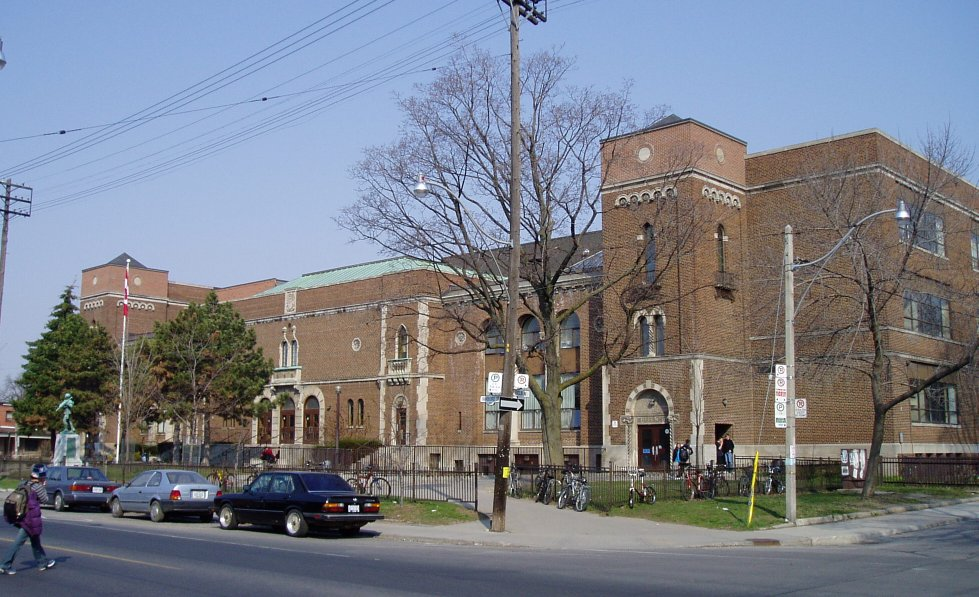
Built in 1892, Harbord Collegiate Institute is a public secondary school operated by the Toronto District School Board.

Secular English-oriented public schools in Palmerston–Little Italy are operated by the Toronto District School Board. In addition to the Toronto District School Board, three other publicly funded school boards operate in Toronto. The publicly funded English-oriented separate schools in Toronto are operated by the Toronto Catholic District School Board. Secular French-oriented public schools are provided by Conseil scolaire Viamonde, whereas French-oriented public separate school are provided by Conseil scolaire catholique MonAvenir. However, the latter school board does not operate a school in the neighbourhood. Public schools in the area include:

- Central Toronto Academy is located on Shaw Street, built in 1916.
- Harbord Collegiate Institute is located on Harbord Street, built in 1892.
- King Edward Public School is a public Junior and Intermediate school on Lippincott Street. King Edward offers Extended French and French Immersion programs that is only available by applying. In order to be eligible for the Gifted Program, students are required to pass an entrance test after grade 3. King Edward offers a wide variety of extra curricular programs, including Band, Basketball Team, Chess Club, Choir, Strings, and Volleyball Team.

== See also ==
- Palmerston Boulevard
- Italians in Toronto
