= Call to arms =

Call to arms may refer to:

== Television ==
- "A Call to Arms" (Charmed), an episode of the television series Charmed
- Babylon 5: A Call to Arms, the fourth feature-length film set in the Babylon 5 universe
- "Call to Arms" (Star Trek: Deep Space Nine), the twenty-sixth and final episode of the fifth season of the television series Star Trek: Deep Space Nine

== Music ==
- Call to Arms (Sick of It All album)
- Call to Arms (C4 album)
- Call to Arms (Saxon album)
- A Call to Arms (EP), a 2001 EP by Bandits of the Acoustic Revolution
- Called to Arms, a progressive metal band from Raleigh, NC
- "Call to Arms", a song by Manowar from the album Warriors of the World
- "Call to Arms", a song by Angels and Airwaves from the album I-Empire
- "Call to Arms", a song by Soulfly from the album 3
- "A Call to Arms", a song by Bayside from the album Shudder
- "A Call to Arms", a song by Mike + The Mechanics from their self-titled album
- "A Call to Arms", a composition by Jason Hayes and Glenn Stafford from the soundtrack of World of Warcraft, used as background music in "the Barrens".

== Literature ==
- Call to Arms (Lu Xun), collection of short stories by Chinese writer Lu Xun
- Call to Arms, the second book in The Corps Series by American writer W.E.B. Griffin
- A Call to Arms, a novel by Alan Dean Foster, the first in The Damned Trilogy
- A Call to Arms, a novel by David Weber, the second in the Manticore Ascendant series, and set in the Honorverse universe
- A Call to Arms, manifesto of the 2022 Bratislava shooter written by Juraj Krajčík

== Games ==
- Call to Arms (1982 video game)
- Call to Arms (2018 video game)
- Babylon 5: A Call to Arms (game), a wargame by Mongoose Publishing, set in the Babylon 5 universe
