= Chicago subway (disambiguation) =

The Chicago subway refers primarily to the Chicago Transit Authority. It may also refer to:

- Underground lines of the Chicago "L", operated by the Chicago Transit Authority
  - Milwaukee–Dearborn subway
  - State Street subway
- Chicago Pedway, a tunnel network

== See also ==
- Chicago Transit Authority (disambiguation)
- Chicago Tunnel Company
