= Ed Mirvish =

American-Canadian businessman

Ed Mirvish OC CBE OOnt
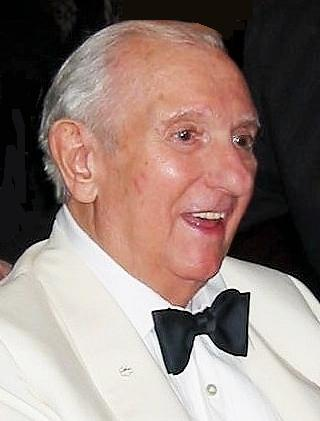
- Ed Mirvish, 2006
- Born: Yehuda Edwin Mirvish; July 24, 1914; Colonial Beach, Virginia, United States
- Died: July 11, 2007 (aged 92); Toronto, Ontario, Canada
- Resting place: Pardes Shalom Cemetery, Vaughan, Ontario, Canada
- Other name: Honest Ed
- Occupations: Founder, chair and CEO of Honest Ed's
- Children: David Mirvish

Yehuda Edwin "Honest Ed" Mirvish, OC CBE OOnt (July 24, 1914 – July 11, 2007) was an American-Canadian businessman, philanthropist and theatrical impresario who lived in Toronto, Ontario. He is known for his flagship business, Honest Ed's, a landmark discount store in downtown Toronto, and as a patron of the arts, instrumental in promoting live theatre in Toronto.

== Biography ==
Born in Colonial Beach, Virginia, the son of Jewish immigrants from Lithuania (his father, David) and Austria (his mother, Anna). His parents gave him the Hebrew name, Yehuda, but at the urging of a cousin, they added a more American name, Edwin. Mirvish often told the tale of his bris; there was no mohel in Colonial Beach, so the family hired one in nearby Washington, D.C., to come down to perform the ceremony. The mohel chosen was Rabbi Moshe Reuben Yoelson, the father of Al Jolson. Mirvish credited this as his introduction to show business.

The family later moved to Washington, D.C., where Mirvish's father opened a grocery store. The grocery store went bankrupt in 1923, and David Mirvish moved his family to Toronto where he worked as a door-to-door salesman – peddling, among other things, Fuller Brushes and the Encyclopedia of Freemasonry – until he opened a grocery at 788 Dundas Street West, just west of Kensington Market which, at the time, was a heavily Jewish neighbourhood. The family lived above the store, sharing their tiny apartment with a Hebrew school. Mirvish would often joke that it was his dream in those days to someday have a bathroom he did not have to share with 50 others.

Mirvish lost his father at the age of 15. He dropped out of school to manage the store, becoming the sole support of his mother, his younger brother, Robert (who became a successful novelist and short-story writer) and sister, Lorraine. The grocery business did not do well, and Mirvish closed shop to reopen as a dry-cleaner, in partnership with his childhood friend, Yale Simpson. The shop was known as Simpson's. When the well-known downtown Toronto department store Simpson's attempted to force him to change the name of his business, Mirvish pointed to Simpson and said, "Here's my Mr. Simpson. Where's yours?" The dry-cleaning business did no better than the grocery, however, and Mirvish soon abandoned it to take a regular job working as a produce manager and buyer for Toronto grocery store entrepreneur Leon Weinstein. Now financially stable, Mirvish bought a Ford Model T and began to court a radio singer and sculptor from Hamilton, Ontario, Anne Macklin, whom he married in 1941. In 1945, their son, David, was born.

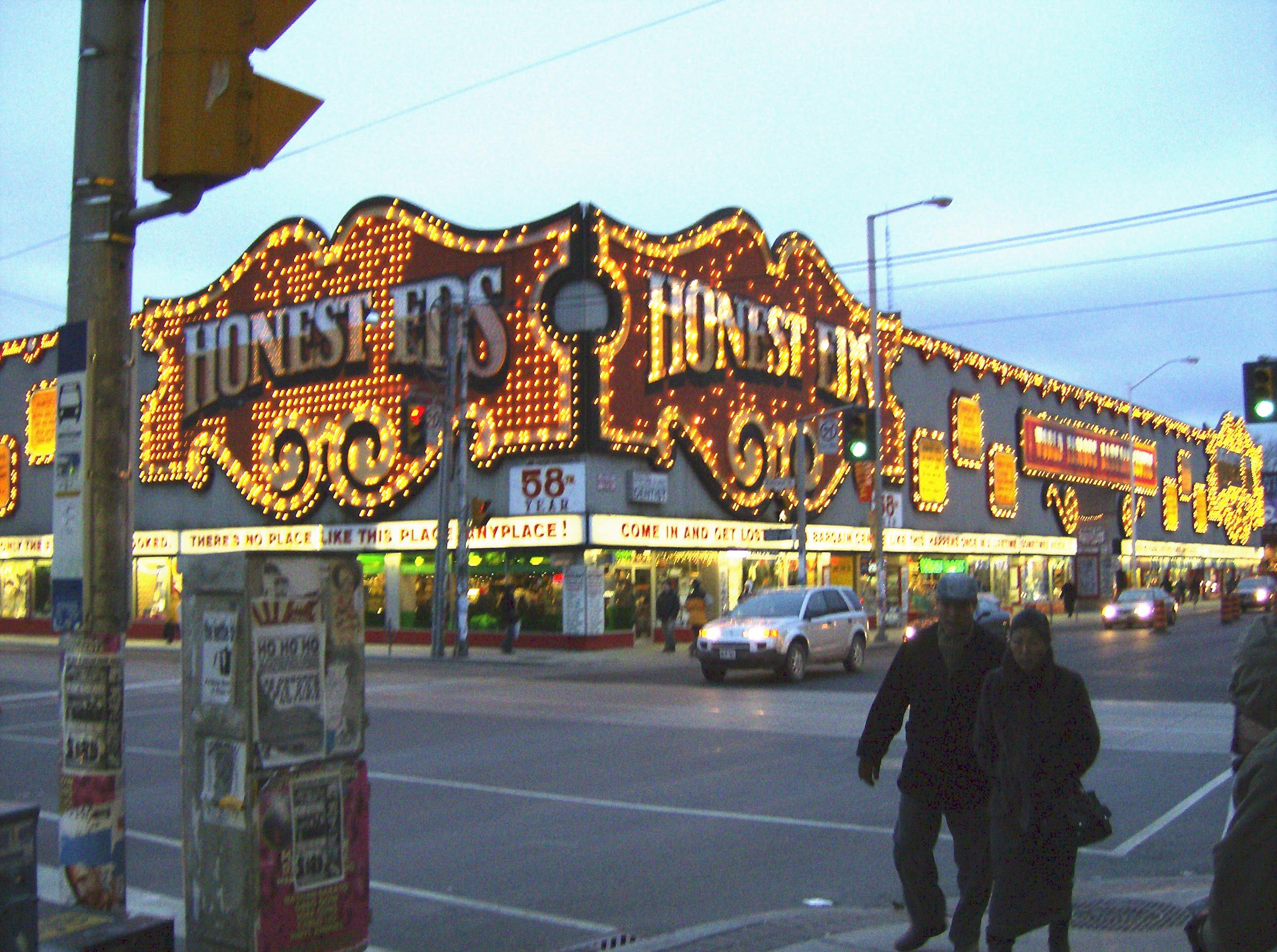
Honest Ed's discount store

In 1943, during World War II, Ed and Anne Mirvish opened a dress shop known as The Sport Bar on Bloor Street near Bathurst. In 1946, the business expanded and was renamed Anne & Eddie's. In 1948, Mirvish cashed in his wife's insurance policy to open a new business, a bargain basement known as "Honest Ed's", stocked with all kinds of odd merchandise purchased at bankruptcy and fire sales, and displayed on orange crates. This unique no-credit, no-service, no-frills business model was an immediate success. Mirvish claimed to have invented the "loss-leader", below-cost discounts on selected items designed to lure buyers into the store. "Honest Ed's" gradually expanded to span the city block from Bathurst Street to Markham Street. Billing itself as "the world's biggest discount department store", it was soon bringing in millions of dollars a year. The store expanded and, in the late 1950s, Mirvish started buying up houses on Markham Street running south from Bloor. When his application to tear down the Edwardian structures to build a parking lot was rejected by the city Mirvish, at the urging of his wife, rented them out at low rates to local artists and the street soon became a community of artists studios, galleries, boutiques and niche shops known today as Mirvish Village.

In June 2006, Ed and Anne Mirvish marked their 65th wedding anniversary with a party at the Princess of Wales Theatre. The mayor of Toronto, the chief of police and other public figures delivered congratulatory speeches, followed by a program of vocal music by some of Toronto's opera and theater stars. In July 2006, Mirvish celebrated his 92nd birthday with a lavish party at Honest Ed's. In honor of this occasion, many items in the store were on sale for 92 cents.

On July 11, 2007, the Mirvish family released a statement to announce the death of Ed Mirvish after midnight at St. Michael's Hospital, Toronto, at age 92. The funeral service was held at the Beth Tzedek Synagogue in Toronto. Mirvish was buried at Pardes Shalom Cemetery in Maple, Ontario. His store was closed and its lights were dimmed, as staff bid farewell to the former owner. A similar gesture was made by theatres on Broadway, which dimmed their lights for one minute at 8 pm on July 13. Toronto Police provided ceremonial and mounted units (including the horse Honest Ed) for his funeral. Flags at Toronto's civic centres were lowered to half-staff.

On August 12, 2007, the City of Toronto granted a closure of Bloor Street between Bathurst and Markham Streets to accommodate a celebration in honour of Ed Mirvish. Ceremonies began with Mayor David Miller, who proclaimed August 12 "Ed Mirvish Day" in the City of Toronto. Jones Cane Sugar Soda issued bottles of their soda with a picture of Honest Ed on them, with "Honest Ed Mirvish 1914–2007" placed where normally a photo credit lies.

Anne Mirvish died in 2013. The Honest Ed's store continued until the end of 2016, when it finally closed, starting a redevelopment of the block Ed had bought up, for residential apartments, new stores and restaurants. The outdoor Honest Ed's electric sign was placed into storage for future display, and all fixtures, including its well-known hand-painted retail signs, were all sold off to the public.

== Publicity stunts ==
Mirvish was renowned for his publicity stunts, doing everything from riding elephants, to hiring protesters to picket his own restaurant over its dress code. Every Christmas, Mirvish gave away ten thousand pounds of free turkeys in his store to shoppers who stood in line for hours. The giveaway continued each Christmas until 2015. A tradition since his 75th birthday was an annual birthday bash outside the store, with free food, entertainment and children's rides. In 2003, Toronto Mayor Mel Lastman proclaimed Mirvish's birthday "Ed Mirvish Day".

At one time, a sign in the store read: "When Ed dies, he would like a catered funeral with accordion players and a buffet table, with a replica of Honest Ed on it made of potato salad."

== Theatres and restaurants ==
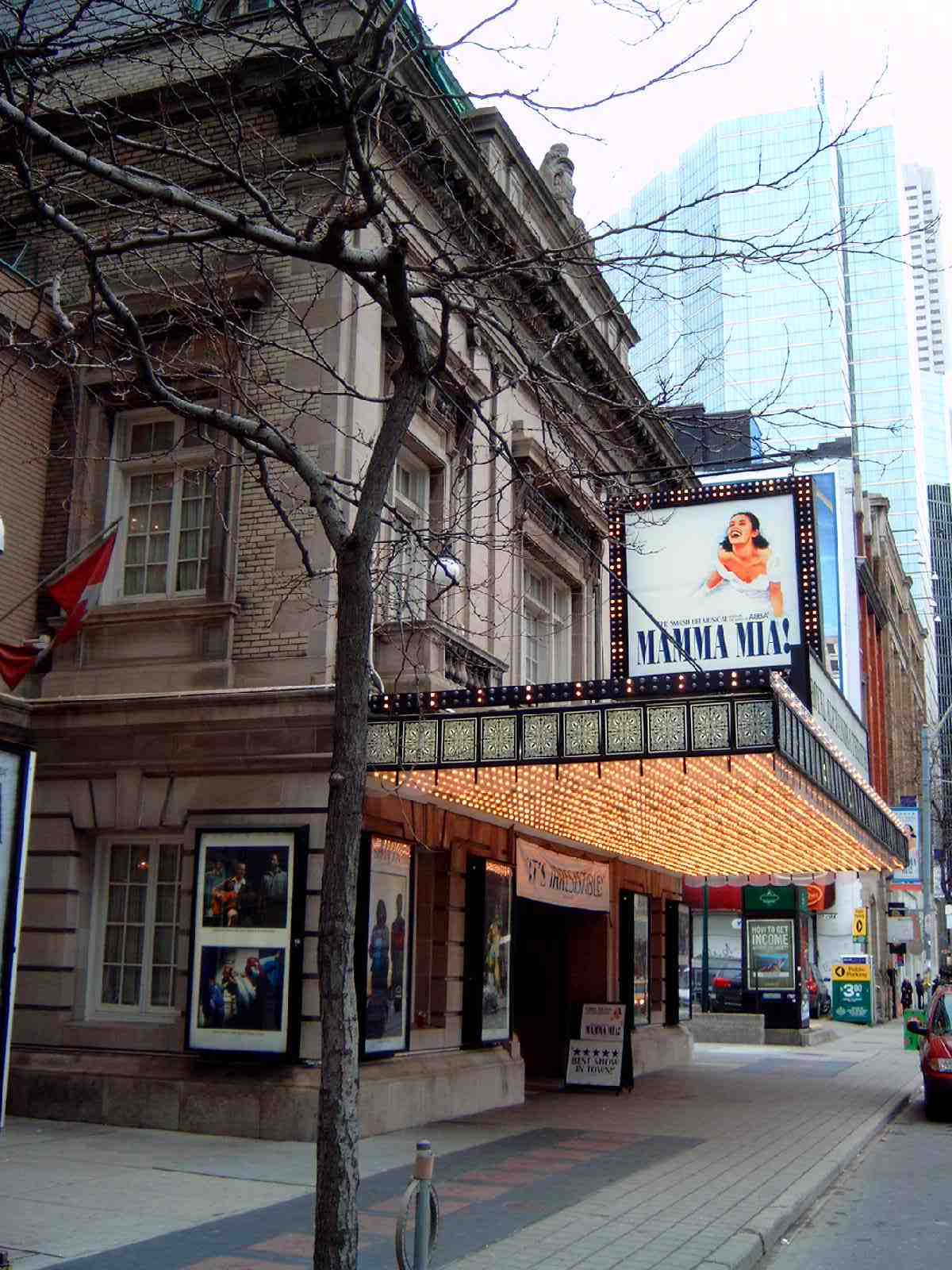
The Royal Alexandra Theatre

In addition to Honest Ed's, Mirvish was known in Toronto for his theatres and restaurants. His first purchase was the Royal Alexandra Theatre, an Edwardian Beaux-Arts landmark building potentially slated for demolition. The recently built O'Keefe Centre was the new venue for productions from New York and London, and the Royal Alex business was in decline. The Mulock estate put it up for sale. Mirvish purchased the building in 1963 at a discount price and refurbished it.

To liven up the neighbourhood and provide patrons with a place to go before and after performances, Mirvish bought and renovated a nearby warehouse building, which he turned into a restaurant. To cut costs, "Ed's Warehouse" at King Street West and Duncan Street served a set meal: prime rib, mashed potatoes and peas. Along the same street, Mirvish later opened Ed's Seafood (276 King Street West), Ed's Folly (267 King Street West), Ed's Chinese, Ed's Italian Restaurant and Old Ed's or Ed's Warehouse (Edwardian style warehouse at 266 King Street West or also as Reid Building built 1904 by Alexander Frank Wickson for Featherbone Novelty Manufacturing Company), which attracted local residents to the previously neglected King Street area and served 6,000 meals a night. As the neighbourhood became revitalized, many other restaurants opened nearby, often serving a wider range of foods than Ed's restaurants and achieving greater popularity; consequently, one by one, Ed's restaurants closed down. The last was Ed's Warehouse, which shut its doors in 2000. The former warehouse buildings remained the property of Mirvish, who had built underground parking below one of them, the rest rented to retail and commercial businesses.

Ed and his son David operated Mirvish Productions, which revitalized the Royal Alex by getting back the major touring theatre productions from Broadway and London that had played the O'Keefe, which had become the home of ballet and opera, and Canadian Opera Company productions too small for the O'Keefe. The stagings helped the company develop its own production capability and the company started producing and/or co-producing its own staging of such recent hits as The Lion King, Mamma Mia!, The Producers and Hairspray. The productions were successful and restored the Royal Alex to profitability. In 1993, the Mirvish's built the Princess of Wales Theatre, the largest new theatre – and first privately financed theatre – in North America in the span of thirty years. In 2001, Mirvish Enterprises signed a management contract to run the Pantages Theatre, renamed the Canon Theatre, for Clear Channel Entertainment (now Live Nation), which had bought up the assets of the bankrupt theatre company, Livent. The first show under the Mirvish banner was a touring production of Saturday Night Fever.

In 1982, Ed and David Mirvish bought London, England's Old Vic theatre for £550,000 stg (CA$1.23 million) and spent four million dollars renovating it. Under their management, The Old Vic was celebrated for winning more awards for its productions than any other single theatre in Britain; It never made money, however, and they sold it to its present owners, a theatre trust, in 1998. Ed Mirvish was made a Commander of the Order of the British Empire for saving the Old Vic.

On December 7, 2011 the Canon Theatre was renamed Ed Mirvish Theatre in his honour.

== Honours and awards ==
- 1978, Made a Member of the Order of Canada
- 1984, Awarded Retail Council of Canada's Distinguished Canadian Retailer of the Year Award
- 1984, Named a Freeman of the City of London in recognition of his contributions to British theatre (he subsequently drove a herd of sheep across London Bridge, a right of a Freeman of the city)
- 1987, Promoted to Officer of the Order of Canada
- 1989, Appointed a Commander of the Order of the British Empire
- 1999, Awarded Retail Council of Canada's Lifetime Achievement Award
- 2008, One block of Duncan Street in Toronto, near the Royal Alex and the Princess of Wales theatres, is renamed Ed Mirvish Way
- 2008, The parkette at Bathurst Subway Station, near Honest Ed's, is renamed Ed & Anne Mirvish Parkette
- 2011, The former Canon Theatre on Yonge Street in Toronto was renamed as the Ed Mirvish Theatre.

== Published works ==
- Mirvish, Edwin (1993). How to Build an Empire on an Orange Crate, or 121 Lessons I Never Learned at School. Toronto: Key Porter Books.
- Mirvish, Ed (1997). There's no business like show business : but I wouldn't ditch my day job. Toronto: Key Porter Books.

== See also ==
- History of the Jews in Toronto
