= Honest Ed's =

Defunct discount store in Toronto, Canada

Coordinates: 43°39′53.5″N 79°24′41.2″W

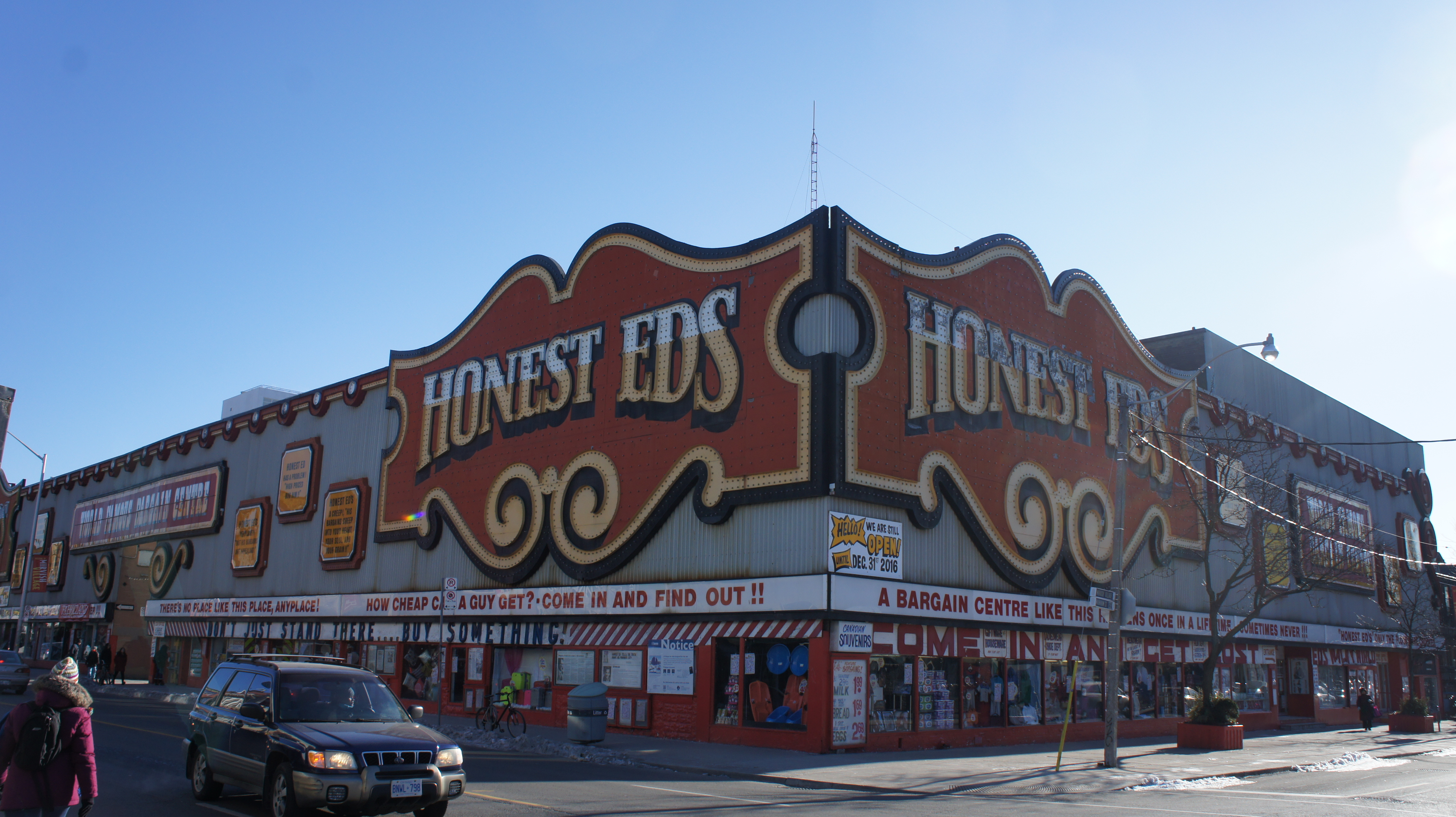
- Type: Private
- Industry: Discount retail
- Founded: 1948
- Founder: Ed Mirvish
- Defunct: December 31, 2016
- Fate: Lost foothold to online retailers
- Headquarters: 581 Bloor Street West; Toronto, Ontario; M6G 1K3
- Key people: David Mirvish
- Products: Department store

Honest Ed's was a landmark discount store in Toronto, Ontario, Canada. It was named for its proprietor, Ed Mirvish, who opened the store in 1948 and oversaw its operations for almost 60 years until his death in 2007. The store continued to operate until it permanently closed on December 31, 2016.

== Location ==
Honest Ed's was located originally on Markham Street at the corner of Bloor Street. The original entrance was on Markham Street. This was done because property taxes would be higher if the store was accessed from Bloor Street, a main arterial street. In the block between Markham and Bloor there was a Toronto-Dominion Bank and a Loblaw’s groceteria (a self-service grocery store), which was purchased and occupied as part of the store complex in the early 1950s. When lineups formed to gain access to the store Toronto police directed the lines to go down Markham Street again, to ensure the store was taxed as a Markham Street business instead of a Bloor Street business. Throughout the store were such hand-painted slogans and enticements to buy as "not cheaper anywhere else in Toronto", "You cannot do without this", and "Every home needs this".

Honest Ed's was located at the corner of Bloor and Bathurst Streets, extending the full length of the block west to Markham Street. The exterior was covered with huge red and yellow signs advertising the store's name, lit up like a theatre marquee. The store sign used 23,000 light bulbs. The outside facade was covered with puns and slogans such as "Come in and get lost!" and "Only the floors are crooked!"

The store consisted of a west building on Markham Street connected by a walkway with an east building on Bathurst Street. The interior was modest, with simple displays of low-priced merchandise from vacuum cleaners and winter coats to kitchenware, toys and grocery items. Much of the store's decor consisted of posters and photos from old films and stage productions from Mirvish's theatres in Toronto and London, England, and of actors and musicians who performed in them (many inscribed to Ed Mirvish). Every piece of store signage was hand-painted.

The new owners have demolished the structure as of March 2018 and intend to redevelop the 1.8 hectares (4.4 acres) of land; which also includes Mirvish Village and a stretch of retail buildings south of the Honest Ed building on Bathurst Street running down to Lennox Street, which were rented out by the Mirvishes to local businesses.

== History ==
Ed and Anne Mirvish opened "The Sport's Bar", a women's clothing store, near Bloor and Bathurst Streets in 1943, renting a property that was five metres (16') wide. The store proved popular. In 1946, the Mirvishes expanded after acquiring several buildings along Bloor, renaming the store "Anne & Eddie's". After a further expansion, Mirvish re-established the store as "Honest Ed's Bargain House" in 1948, adding general household goods to the inventory. In 1952, the Mirvishes acquired their first property on Markham Street, behind the store and eventually acquired several more homes on the street with the intent of building a parking lot. Instead, this evolved into the Mirvish Village neighbourhood in the 1960s after the city turned down the store's application to raze the buildings and Anne Mirvish persuaded her husband to rent the houses out to artists. In 1958, "Honest Ed's" expanded west to Markham Street to encompass 6,000 square feet and in 1984, the Honest Ed's annex building was completed expanding the store east to Bathurst Street.

The main building was at 581 Bloor Street West and the annex at 760 Bloor Street West with the two connected by a walkway crossing Honest Ed Alley.

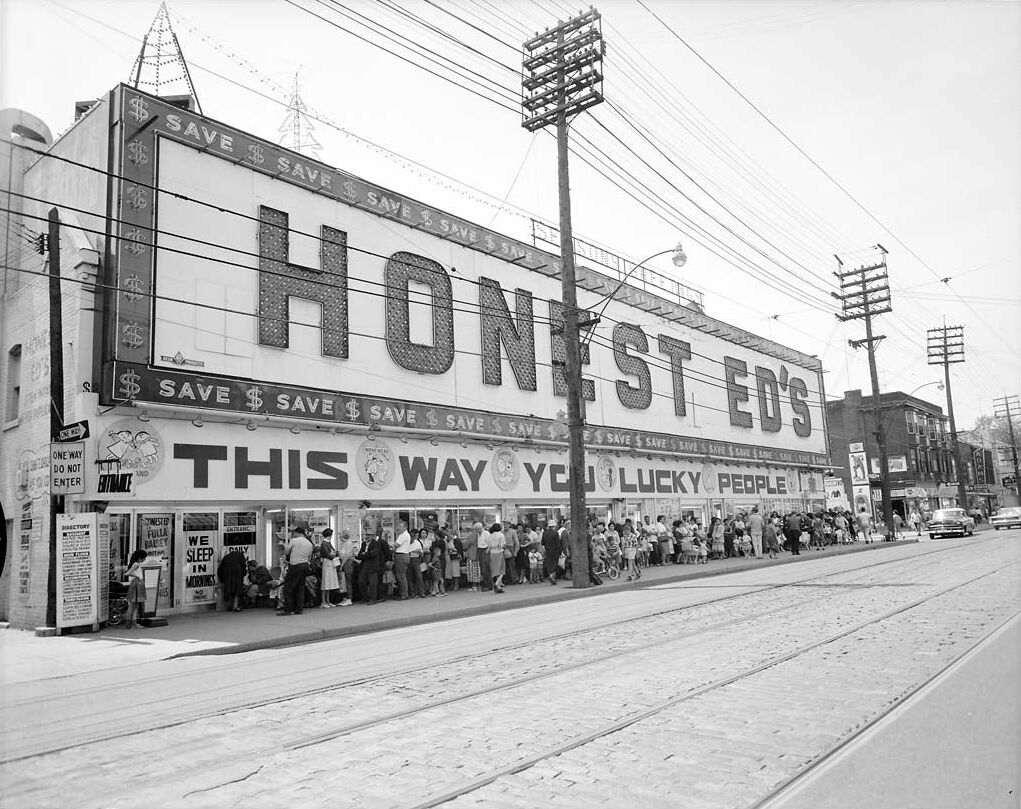
Crowd at Honest Ed's, on the south east corner of Bloor St. West and Markham St., 1960s

Honest Ed's gained fame for its marketing stunts, including loss leader specials. By 1968 the store was grossing $14 million annually. Mirvish's annual turkey giveaway before Christmas always received media attention; this annual event continued even after his death, until the Christmas season of 2015. Mirvish also threw birthday parties for himself from 1988 until his death, continued since then as anniversary parties for the store itself. At the street parties, there were free cakes, meals, hot dogs, candy, and giveaways. Crowds of Torontonians turned up with their children and stood in long lines to receive these handouts. The event was accompanied by live bands and balloons.

=== Annual turkey giveaway ===
One of the store's most famous traditions was its annual Christmas turkey giveaway. Started by Ed Mirvish in 1987, the event distributed thousands of pounds of free turkeys to community members who lined up around the block, often standing in the cold for hours. The event often featured guest volunteers, including Toronto mayors and athletes such as Pinball Clemons. The tradition continued even after Ed Mirvish's death, with the final public giveaway taking place in December 2015, prior to the store's closure.

== Sale of property, closure, and redevelopment ==
On July 16, 2013, it was announced the site of Honest Ed's was for sale for $100 million, and the store was likely to be closed and replaced with a retail and residential building.

Until 1990, the store's business had grown, but then started to decline about four years before Walmart entered Canada in 1994. Besides big-box stores, other impacts on Honest Ed's business were internet shopping, the gentrification of downtown and the dispersion of the working and immigrant class to the inner suburbs of Toronto. Although the store never had a loss, its staff dwindled from 400 to 75 over the years.

Another factor in the store's closure was David Mirvish did not have his father's enthusiasm for the store, preferring the family theatre business. David Mirvish said: Retail "wasn’t where my heart was. In the end, I would have had to decide that’s where we should have put our resources and grow. And I had other opportunities in fields I understood better."

The site's redevelopment is expected to affect a number of businesses that lease space within the Honest Ed's building, and a number of standalone businesses on Bathurst Street adjoining the Honest Ed's building running south to Lennox, south of Honest Ed's, and in Mirvish Village which are under the same property ownership. The property's sale to Vancouver-based Westbank Properties, a luxury developer of hotels, residences and office space, was announced in October 2013, but David Mirvish announced he would rent the property from Westbank for two to three years, during which time Honest Ed's and the Mirvish Village businesses would continue to operate until the developer decided what to do with the 1.8 ha (4 1/2 acres) parcel of land.

On September 13, 2014, The Globe & Mail reported the formation of a redevelopment team for the property that includes the design lead Gregory Henriquez of Vancouver's Henriquez Partners Architects, supported by DSA Architects as AOR, ERA Heritage Architects, Janet Rosenberg & Studio, Reshape Strategies, and Urban Strategies Planning The redeveloped property is to be subdivided into zones with residential rental towers, retail storefronts, new pedestrian lanes, and a woonerf on Markham Street. According to Urban Toronto, the iconic Honest Ed's sign will not be part of the site redevelopment. The proposed redevelopment includes 1,000 rental apartments, a permanent public market; and retail space largely divided into small units that mimic the scale of storefronts on Bloor Street.

The Honest Ed's retail store closed on December 31, 2016, and the remaining stores in Mirvish Village (Markham Street) and on properties formerly owned by Mirvish on Bathurst Street south of Honest Ed's closed by January 31, 2017.

By mid-2026, the high-rise development on the Honest Ed's site was mostly completed with some units already rented. The site was being named Mirvish Village and includes the heritage houses on Markham Street that were converted into shops and eateries. The high-rise development has 106 retail units and 550 residential units, all rentals. A narrow, shop-lined pedestrian street named Honest Ed's Alley lies between the high-rise buildings and is based on similar streets in Tokyo. Mirvish Village will feature a replica of the Honest Ed's sign that used to stand at the corner of Bathurst and Bloor Streets. Honest Ed's Park opened in July 2026 on the west side of Markham Street adjacent to Mirvish Village.

== Cultural impact ==
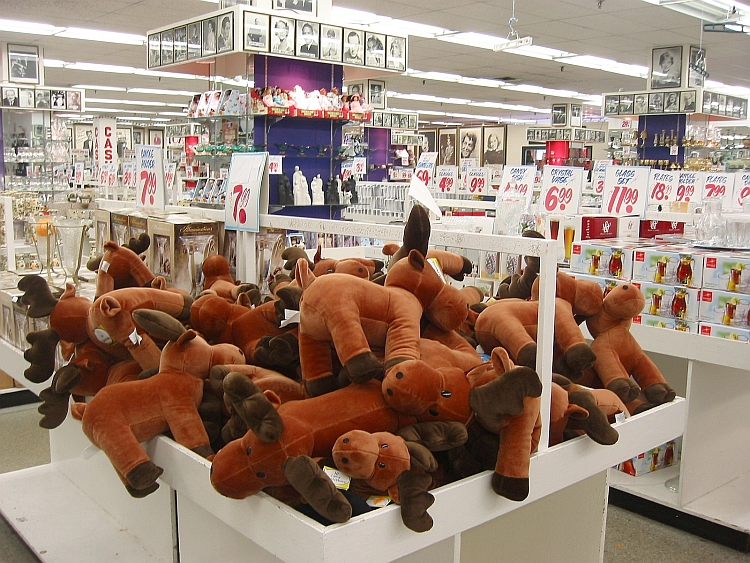
Sale items at Honest Ed's

The store has appeared in several films and television shows shot in Toronto such as The Long Kiss Goodnight.

Honest Ed's has been featured throughout the Scott Pilgrim franchise. In the third volume, Scott Pilgrim and the Infinite Sadness, a battle between Scott Pilgrim and rival Todd Ingram takes place at Honest Ed's, with the characters suffering sensory overload due to the incredible amounts of merchandise. The store implodes after Todd breaks an agreement not to use his psychic powers. It can also be seen in several background scenes in the film adaption, Scott Pilgrim vs. the World, when Scott and his friends are dining at Pizza Pizza across the street from the store. It appears again but renamed to "Honest Ex's" in the first episode of the anime adaption, Scott Pilgrim Takes Off, "Scott Pilgrim's Precious Little Life" where Scott walks past the sign with the white banner slogan saying "This only happens once in a lifetime. Sometimes never.". In the final episode, "The World Vs Scott Pilgrim", the logo used for Scott Pilgrim's Precious Little Musical resembles the Honest Ed's sign.

The store appears in the background of Nathan Fielder's 2008 video "Side of Smooth-'Morning Walk.'"

From February to March 2009, the store hosted "Honest Threads", an interactive artwork by installation artist Iris Häussler, curated by Mona Filip of the Koffler Centre of the Arts. Häussler installed a boutique of clothes lent by Torontonians, each associated with a personal story. Visitors were able to borrow the garments for a few days and wear them, experiencing both literally and psychologically what it is like to "walk in someone else’s shoes." This synthesis of conceptual art and commercial space was well received and reviewed widely on a national and local level and in numerous blogs. In November 2013, the Koffler Centre of the Arts produced 'Honesty', a site-specific play by playwright/director Jordan Tannahill in which performer Virgilia Griffith embodied seven real employees of the store.

Honest Ed's was referenced in the 2011 Toronto stage production of The Lion King, where a brightly coloured stage curtain is described by the character of Zazu as "a shower curtain from Honest Ed's".

Honest Ed's was featured as the setting for the music video "Wide Open" by Toronto singer Jenny Mayhem. In the video Jenny plays a daydreaming Honest Ed's employee, who fantasizes about being a star. The video was directed by Ace Billet and was shot in Honest Ed's and in other locations around Mirvish Village.

Honest Ed's is featured prominently in an episode of the Viceland series Nirvanna the Band the Show, where the main characters Matt and Jay look for a Christmas tree to decorate their Christmas float with.

The store is the subject of Lulu Wei's 2020 documentary film There's No Place Like This Place, Anyplace.

The iconic Honest Ed's sign was dismantled and removed from the building on May 23, 2017, and was to be restored and installed above the Victoria Street entrance of the Ed Mirvish Theatre. By 2025, the sign had not been installed. The Toronto Star interviewed David Mirvish on its installation delay. Mirvish stated that the sign was in storage in Orillia. The original plan to hang the sign on the theatre was not feasible as the sign was too heavy for the old theatre's wall. The sign was also found to be in very poor condition, and restoring its functionality was difficult.

== Tributes ==
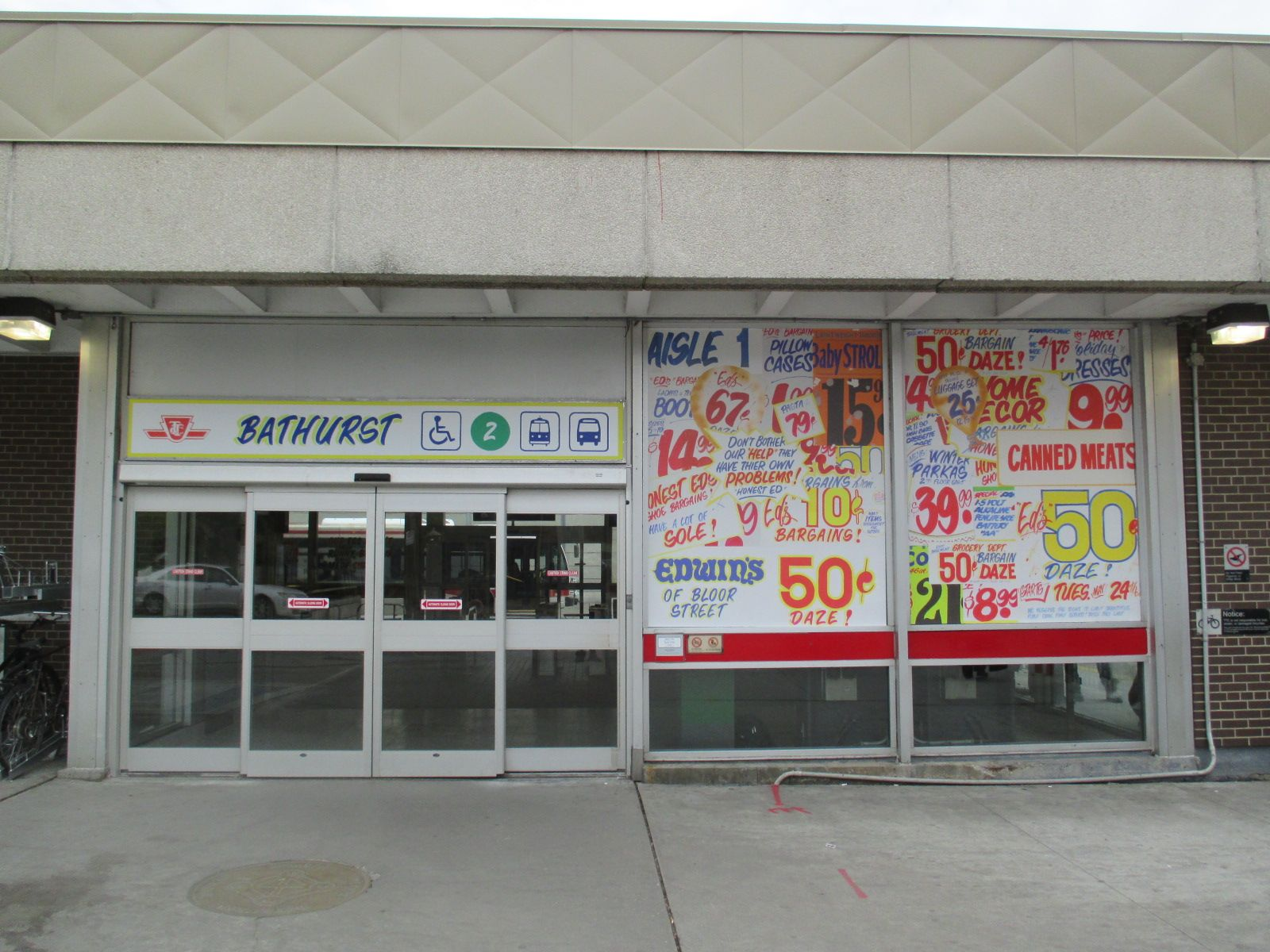
Tribute to Honest Ed's at Bathurst subway station

Ed and Anne Mirvish Parkette, located within the streetcar loop at Bathurst subway station, is named for the Mirvishes.

On November 1, 2016, the Toronto Transit Commission installed a temporary tribute to Honest Ed's at Bathurst station. The display included hand-painted signs and pun-filled slogans that evoked Honest Ed's signature visual style. The concourse level showcased photographs and store memorabilia, while the platform walls were adorned with signs providing facts about the store. This display was removed after the closure of Honest Ed's on December 31, 2016.

The TTC later installed a permanent tribute on the concourse level of the station. This tribute consists of five vertical panels with images and memorabilia associated with the store, accompanied by a trompe-l'œil mural of the vault door on the store's north side.

A portion of the iconic Honest Ed's sign is to be restored and moved to the Ed Mirvish Theatre at Yonge and Dundas.

A four-day long goodbye party was held in the building from February 22 to 27, 2017, as a fundraiser for the Centre for Social Innovation. The celebrations included dance performances, music, installations, film, live sign painting by the original Honest Ed's sign painter, Douglas Kerr, speakers and panel discussions on the cultural and social significance of Honest Ed's, and an art maze.
