= Context Development =

Context Development Inc. is a Canadian real estate development company that focuses on building residential projects in downtown Toronto, Ontario. It was founded in 1997 by Stephen Gross and Howard Cohen. The company's name refers to each project reflecting the context of the neighbourhood that surrounds it.

The company is known for urban design and contemporary architecture. It has worked with the Toronto architectural firm called architectsAlliance on several condominium buildings.

== Projects ==
- 20 Niagara
- 150 Dan Leckie Way
- 501 Adelaide Street East
- District Lofts
- Home
- Ideal Condominium
- Kensington Market Lofts
- Lawrence Heights
- Library District Condominiums
- Market Wharf
- Mozo
- Radio City
- Spire The Condominium
- The Loretto
- The Yorkdale Condominiums
- The Yorkdale Townhomes On The Park
- Tip Top Lofts
- Upper East Side
- Wynford Green
