= Chicago Transit Authority (disambiguation) =

The Chicago Transit Authority is the operator of mass transit within the City of Chicago, Illinois, USA.

Chicago Transit Authority may also refer to:

- Chicago (band), formerly named The Chicago Transit Authority, a U.S. music band
  - Chicago Transit Authority (album), eponymous 1969 debut album by the mentioned band

== See also ==
- Chicago subway (disambiguation)
- Chicago (disambiguation)
- CTA (disambiguation)
