= Little Italy, Toronto =

Little Italy
- Neighbourhood
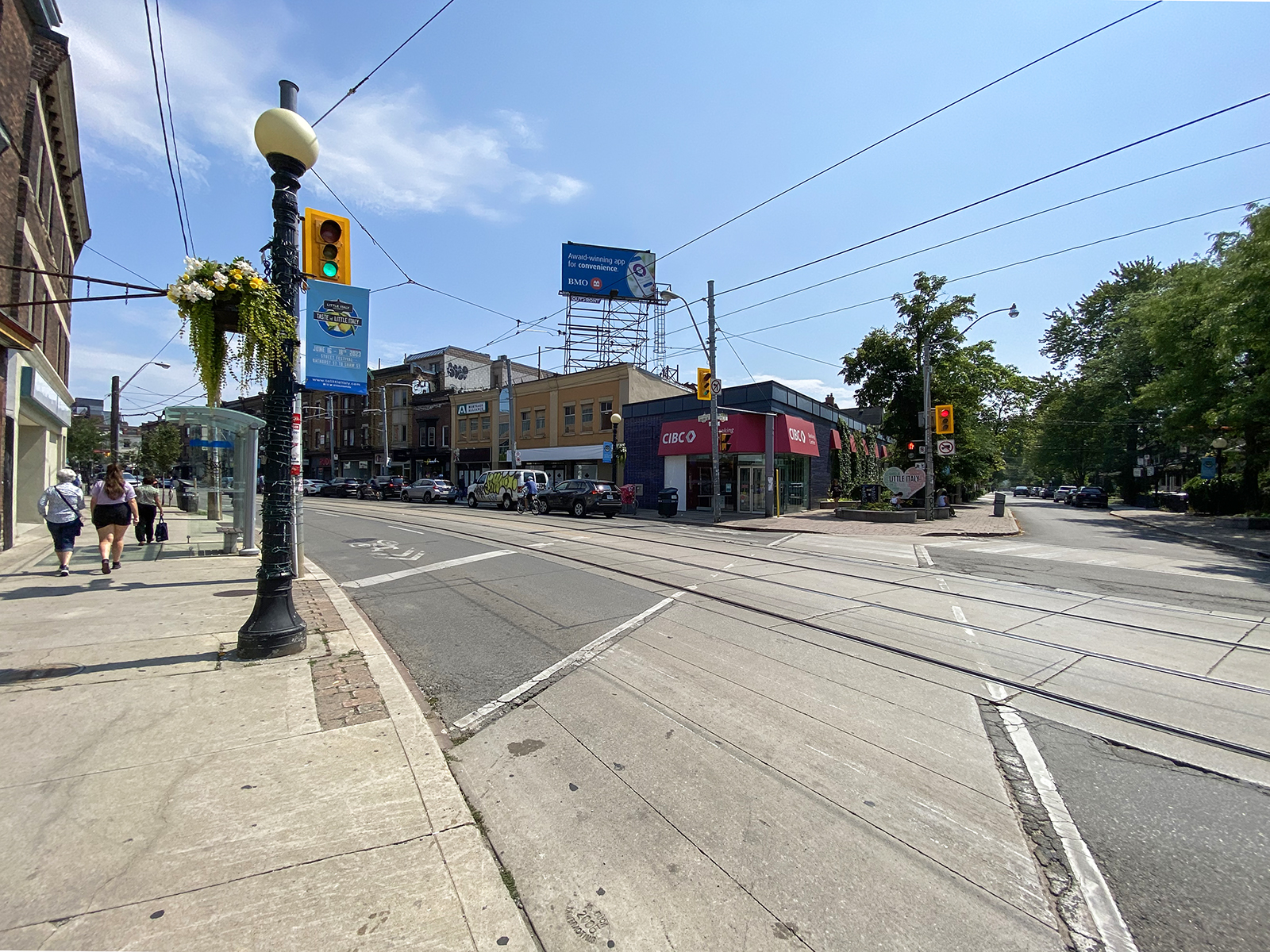
- Street view of Little Italy from Grace St and College Street

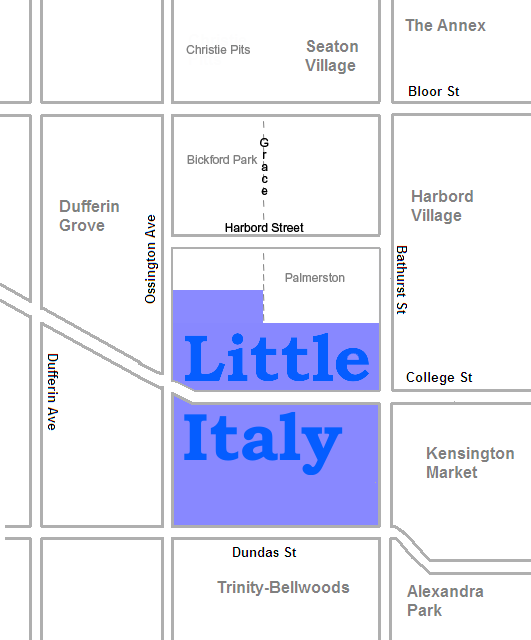
- Approximate Little Italy boundaries

- Location within Toronto
- Coordinates: 43.655°N 79.413°W
- Country: Canada
- Province: Ontario
- City: Toronto

Little Italy, sometimes referred to as College Street West, is a district in Toronto, Ontario, Canada. It is known for its Italian Canadian restaurants and businesses. There is also a significant Latin-Canadian and Portuguese-Canadian community in the area. The district is centred on a restaurant/bar/shopping strip along College Street, imprecisely between Harbord Street and Dundas Street, and spreading out east and west between Bathurst Street and Ossington Avenue. It is contained within the larger city-recognized neighbourhood of Palmerston-Little Italy.

== History ==
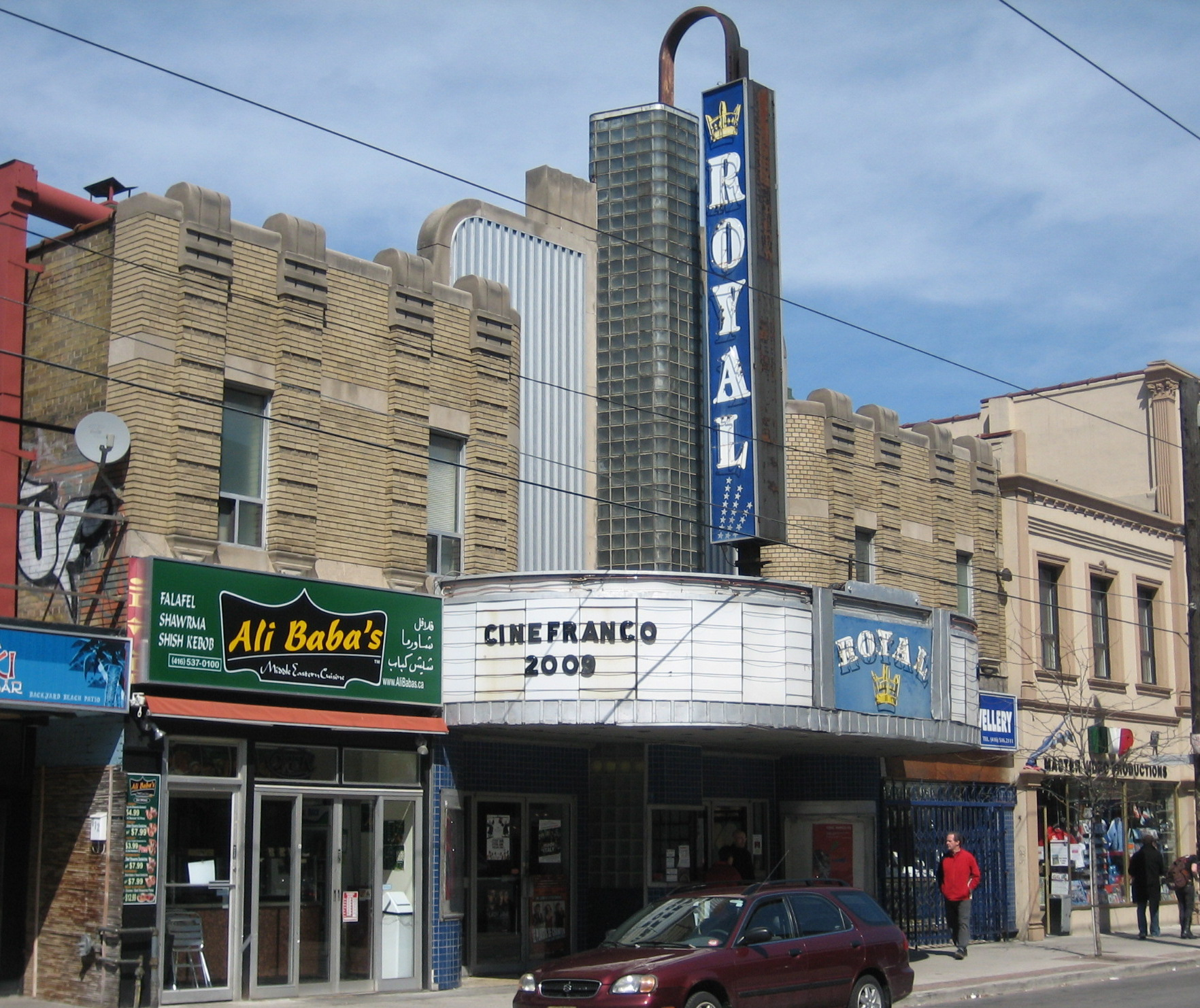
The Royal Cinema is a theatre that was opened in 1939.

College Street was fully laid out in the area by 1900 and the area was filled with buildings from the early 1900s. College Street is fronted by two- and three-story buildings, with commercial uses on the ground floor and residential or storage uses on the upper floors.

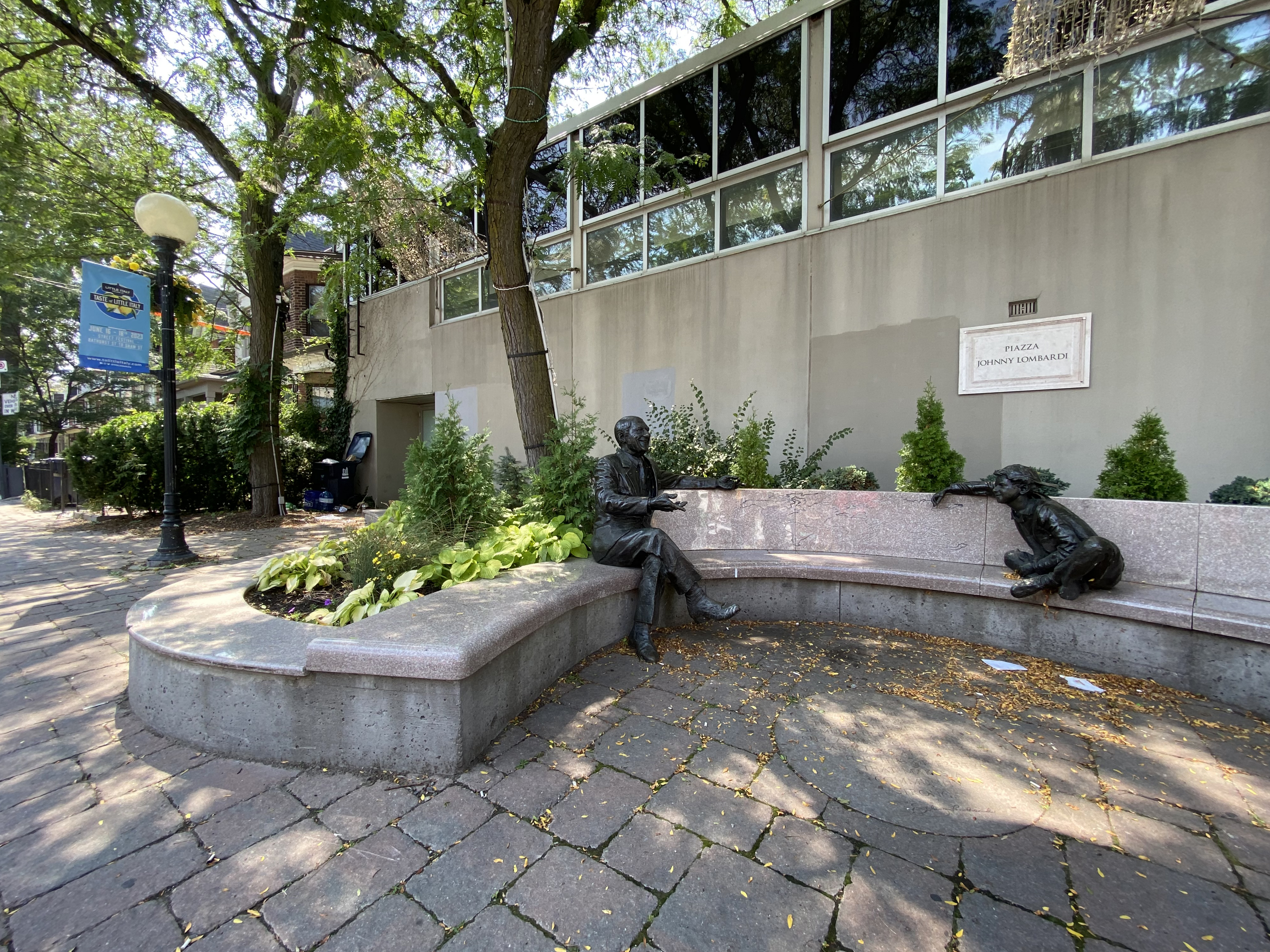
A statue of Johnny Lombardi, who launched Canada's first multicultural radio station in 1966 from Little Italy.

Italians arrived in Toronto in large numbers during the early 20th century. Italians first settled in an area then known as The Ward, centred on University Avenue and College Street. Approximately 40,000 Italians came to Canada during the interwar period of 1914 to 1918, predominantly from Southern Italy where an economic depression and overpopulation had left many families in poverty. Son to Italian immigrants, Johnny Lombardi was born in The Ward in 1915, and went on to found one of the first multilingual radio stations in Canada, CHIN in 1966, in Palmerston–Little Italy. By the 1920s, most Italians had moved west of Bathurst Street and the College-Clinton area had emerged as the city's major Little Italy. They mainly immigrated to Toronto—increasing from 4,900 Italians in 1911, to 9,000 in 1921, constituting almost two percent of Toronto's population.

A tourist attraction of the area is the Italian Walk of Fame. Granite and brass stars line the sidewalk with the names of noteworthy Italian Canadians. At Clinton Street, on the north side, is the Royal Cinema, which was recently renovated and has an upgraded projection system as it is used for movie editing purposes during the day and repertory cinema in the evenings. While the commercial units are dominated by cafes and restaurants, there are numerous other small businesses serving the neighbourhood.

The side streets are mostly detached or semi-detached single family homes dating to the early-1900s Edwardian period, with front porches and smaller lots, as was the custom at the time.

As early as 1961, the presence of new immigrants had already started changing Little Italy. That year, 15,000 Italians, 12,000 being immigrants, lived in Little Italy (35 percent of the population), declining to 8,000 in 1971, and further to 3,600 in 1991 (13 percent of the population). Since the 1970s, Italian immigrants from Little Italy moved northward to Corso Italia on St. Clair Avenue West. Much of the Italian population subsequently moved to the suburbs northwest of Toronto, in particular, Vaughan, King, and Caledon. Although the character of the neighbourhood is still has several Italian restaurants and bakeries, the demographics of this neighbourhood have changed drastically with a smaller Italian population than originally.

== Landmarks ==
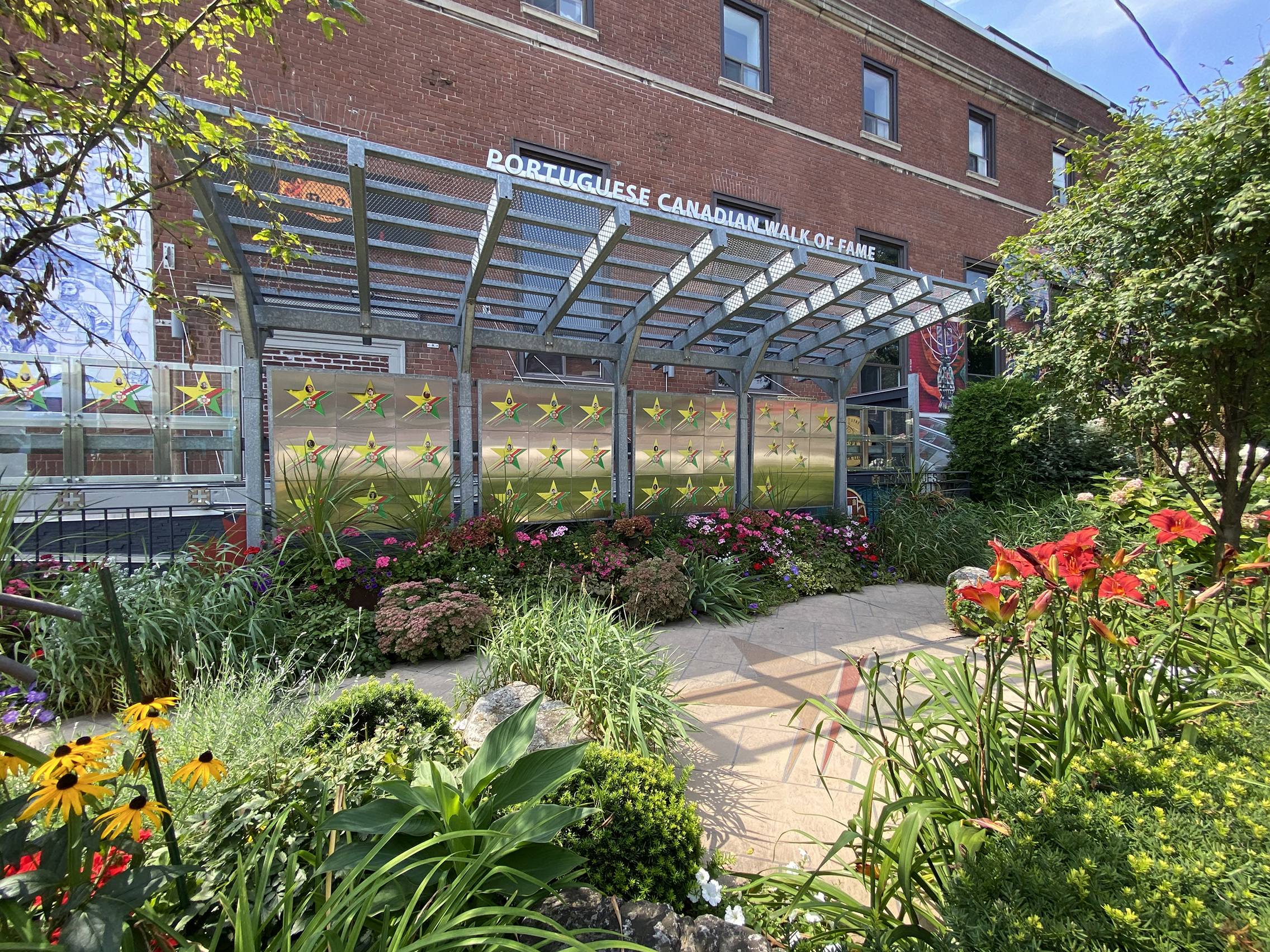
Portuguese Canadian Walk of Fame

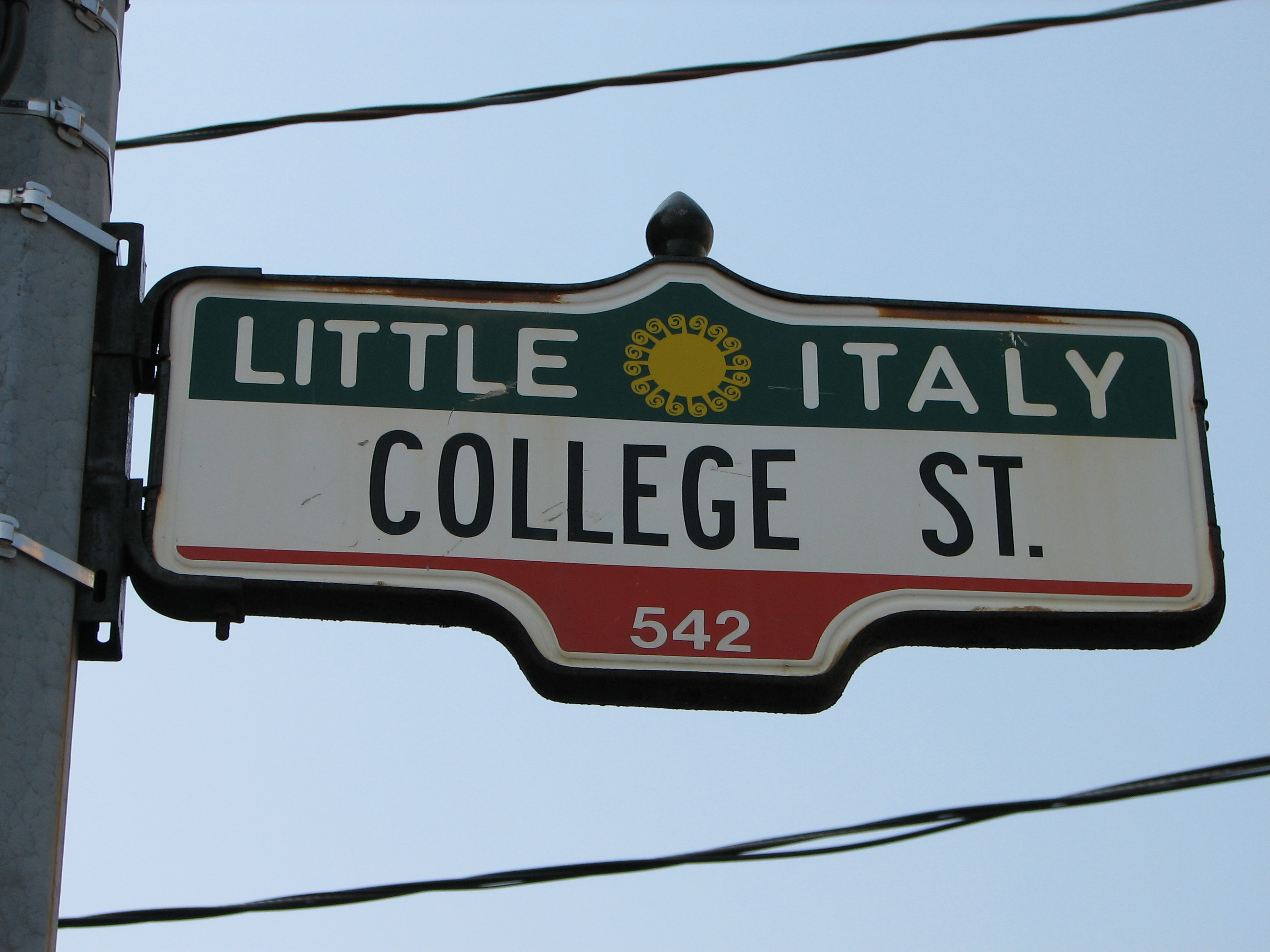
Street sign in Little Italy typically include colours of the Italian flag.

- Italian Walk of Fame
- Church of St. Mary Magdalene
- Church of St. Francis of Assisi
- College Street United Church
- Mod Club Theatre
- Weldon Park
- Portuguese Seventh-day Adventist Church

== Education ==
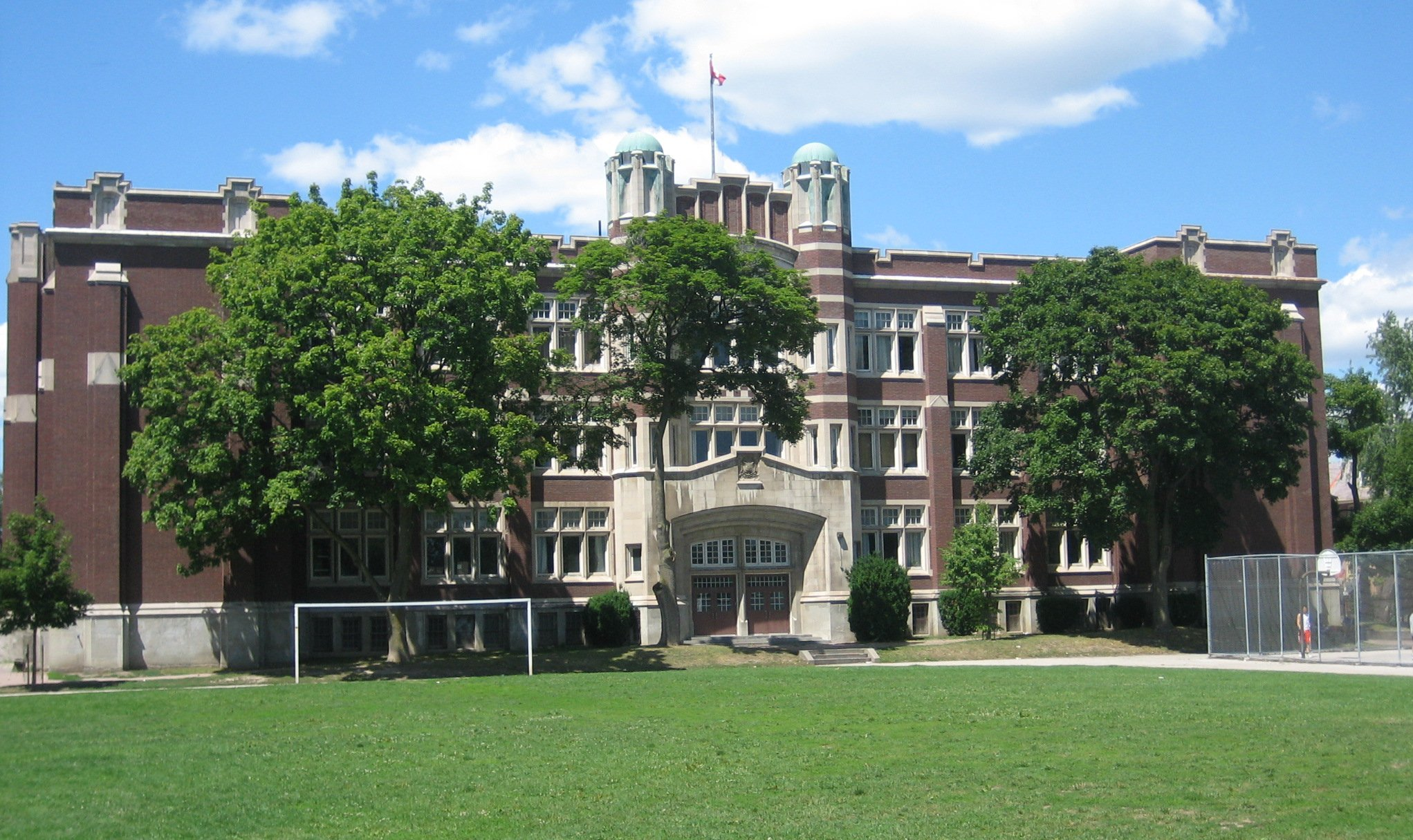
Central Toronto Academy is a public secondary school in Little Italy.

Secular and Catholic schools for Anglophones, as well as a secular public school for French speakers, are operated in Little Italy by the Toronto District School Board, Toronto Catholic District School Board, and Conseil scolaire Viamonde, respectively.

Public primary schools in the area include:

- Clinton Street Junior Public School, on Clinton Street (TDSB);
- École élémentaire Pierre-Eliott-Trudeau, on Grace Street (Viamonde);
- Montrose Junior Public School (TDSB), on Montrose Avenue (TDSB), which also houses Delta Alternative Senior School (TDSB);
- Saint Francis of Assisi Catholic School, on Clinton Street (TCDSB).

Public high schools in the area, all operated by the TDSB, include:

- Central Toronto Academy, formerly Central Commerce, is located on Shaw Street, built in 1916.
- Harbord Collegiate Institute is located on Harbord Street, built in 1892.
- West End Alternative School is located within the Bickford Centre on Bloor Street, built in 1965 as Bickford Park High School.

== In popular culture ==
Television and film productions are occasionally filmed in the neighbourhood. Movies filmed nearby include Chloe, Police Academy, Scott Pilgrim vs. the World, The F Word, and The Long Kiss Goodnight. In December 2013 and 2014 the TV series Beauty & the Beast decorated the corner of College St. and Markham St. with a New York City Subway entrance, emergency vehicles, and newspaper stands.

A 2018 romantic comedy titled Little Italy takes place in Toronto's Little Italy. The film was also featured on an episode of How Did This Get Made?

== See also ==
- List of neighbourhoods in Toronto
- Corso Italia, Toronto
- Italians in Toronto
