= Tip Top Tailors Building =

Coordinates: 43.635202°N 79.402029°W

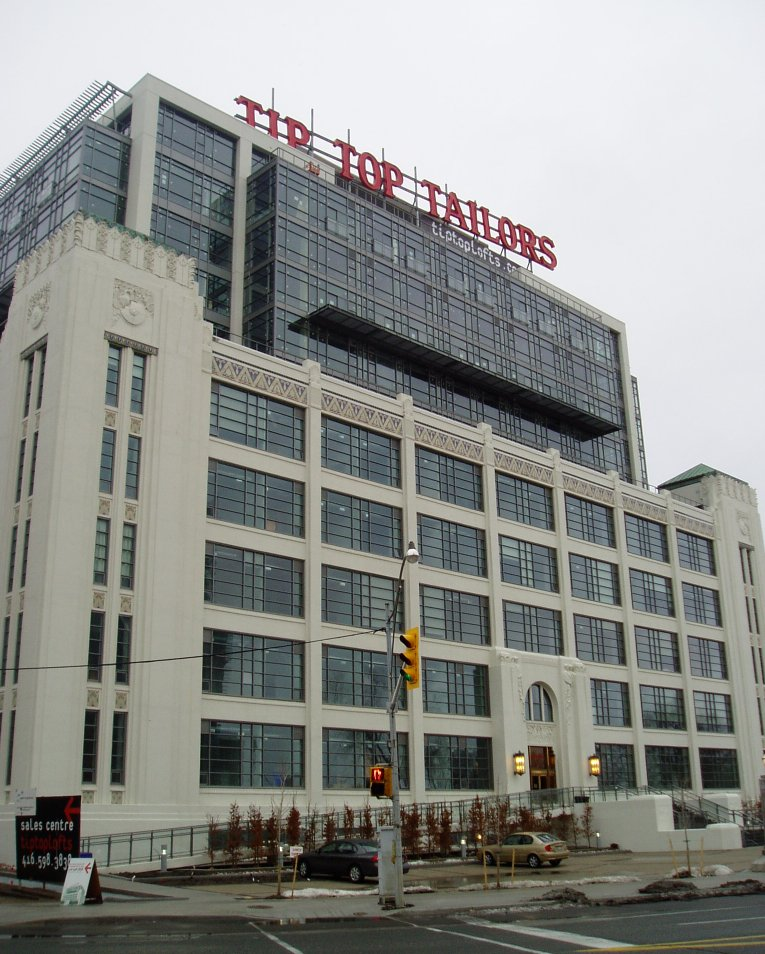
View of the building in 2005

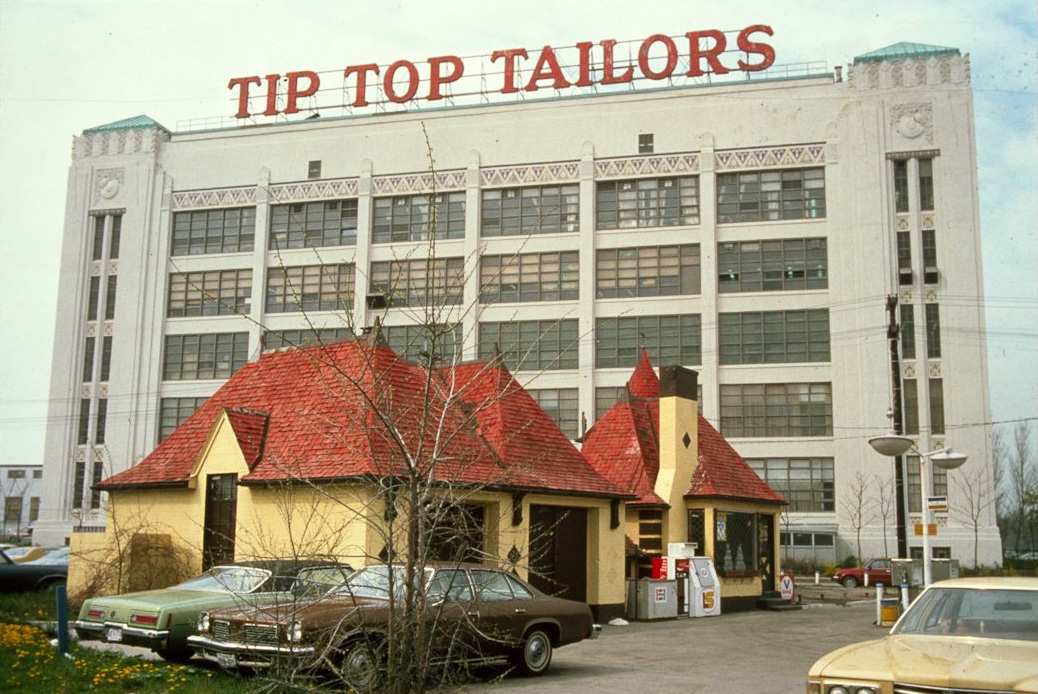
The Tip Top Tailors Building around 1980, with a Joy Gas Station in front

The Tip Top Tailors Building, now known as the Tip Top Lofts, is a former 1920s industrial building that was converted to condominium lofts in Toronto, Ontario, Canada. It is located at 637 Lake Shore Boulevard West, just west of Bathurst Street, near the waterfront. It was the former headquarters of Tip Top Tailors Ltd., a Canadian menswear retailer.

== Description ==
Designed by Bishop and Miller architects using Art Deco decoration, the building was completed in 1929 and housed the manufacturing, warehousing, retail and office operations of Tip Top Tailors Ltd., a menswear clothing retailer founded in 1909 by Polish-Jewish immigrant David Dunkelman, father of Ben Dunkelman.

Tip Top Tailors eventually became part of the Dylex clothing conglomerate. In 1972, the building was designated as a heritage structure by the City of Toronto.

In spring 2002, Dylex sold the property to Context Development, which converted it into condominium lofts. The conversion was designed by architectsAlliance of Toronto. The conversion included the addition of six stories on the roof. The neon 'Tip Top Tailors' rooftop sign was retained and given a slant.

The front entrance of the building was used for the outside facade of the police department throughout the TV series Monk.
