= Bathurst station (Toronto) =

Toronto subway station

Bathurst
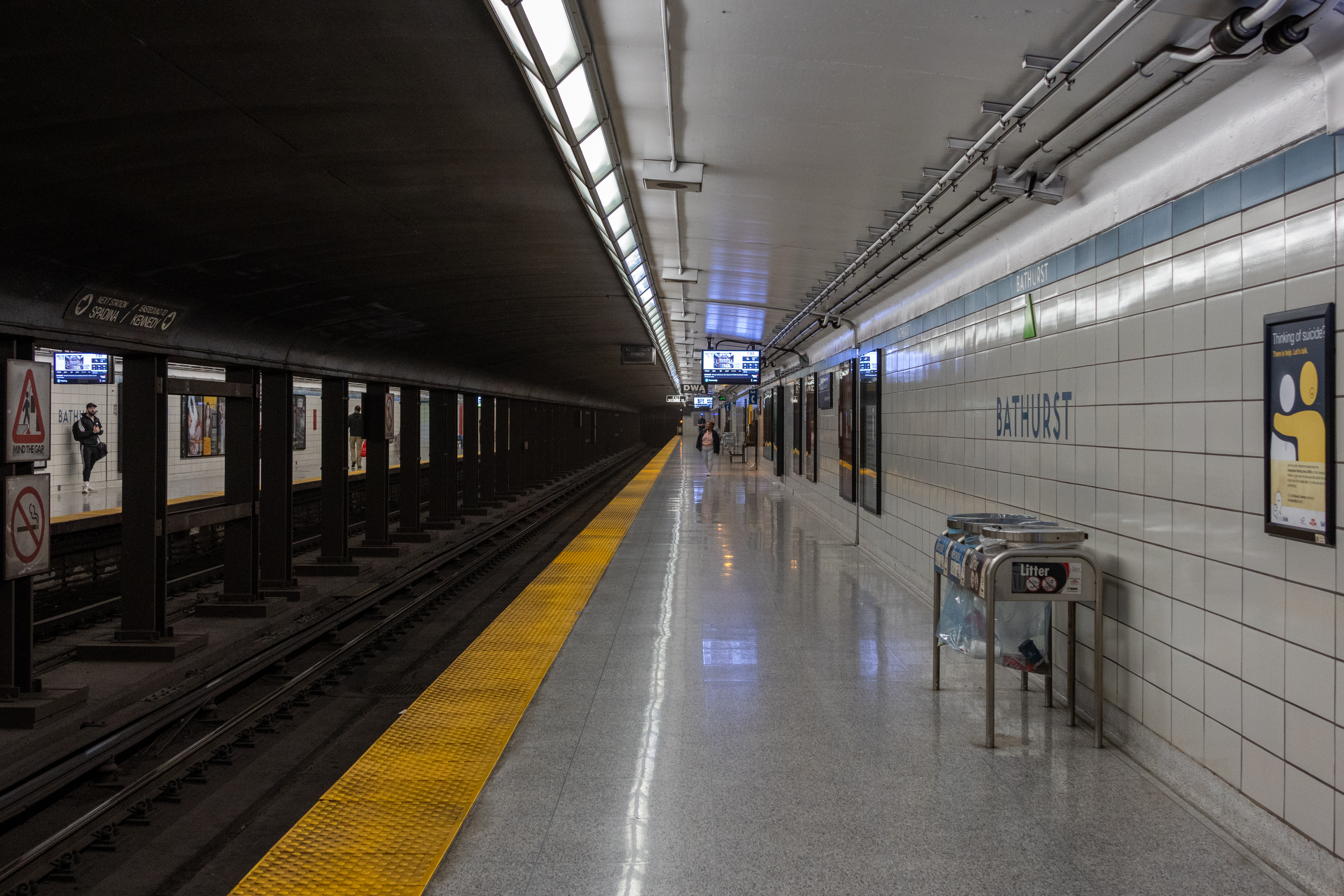

General information
- Location: 819 Bathurst Street; Toronto, Ontario; Canada
- Coordinates: 43°39′57″N 79°24′40″W
- Platforms: Side platforms
- Tracks: 2
- Connections: TTC buses and streetcars: 7 Bathurst; 511 Bathurst; 300 Bloor - Danforth; 307 Bathurst

Construction
- Structure type: Underground
- Accessible: Yes

Other information
- Website: Official station page

History
- Opened: February 26, 1966; 60 years ago

Passengers
- 2023–2024: 30,598
- Rank: 18 of 70

Services
Preceding station	Toronto Transit Commission	Following station
Christie towards Kipling	Line 2 Bloor–Danforth	Spadina towards Kennedy
Lennox Street towards Exhibition Loop	511 Bathurst	Terminus
Location

Bathurst is a subway station on Line 2 Bloor–Danforth in Toronto, Ontario, Canada. The station, which opened in 1966, is located on Bathurst Street just north of Bloor Street West. It is a major transfer point for both bus and streetcar routes, including the 511 Bathurst route, which provides services to Exhibition Place.

The main entrance at Bathurst and Bloor, where the collectors and faregates are located, is in the station building at the surface, which puts the station's streetcar and bus platforms within the fare paid zone. The opening of elevators in January 2000 made the station fully accessible. The elevators provide access between the eastbound platform and concourse, and between the westbound platform and street level via the concourse. There is regular stairway and escalator connections between all levels. There is also a secondary unstaffed entrance on Markham street just north of Bloor street, which leads directly to the subway platform.

On August 4, 2020, the Photo ID Centre at Sherbourne station was permanently closed and relocated to Bathurst station on the concourse level.

== Destinations ==
The station serves The Annex and Koreatown neighbourhoods. Nearby destinations include St. Peter's Roman Catholic Church, Bathurst Street Theatre, Hot Docs Ted Rogers Cinema (formerly the Bloor Hot Docs Cinema), Lee's Palace, Central Technical School and Harbord Collegiate Institute.

== Surface connections ==
When the subway is closed, buses and streetcars do not enter the station. An on-street transfer is required at Bathurst Street and Bloor Street during this time. TTC routes serving the station include:

Route	Name	Additional information
7	Bathurst	Northbound to Steeles Avenue West via Forest Hill station
307	Bathurst	Northbound to Steeles Avenue West and southbound to Exhibition Loop
511	Bathurst	Streetcar; southbound to Exhibition Loop
300A	Bloor–Danforth	Eastbound to Warden, westbound to Pearson Airport (On-street transfer)
300B	Bloor–Danforth	Eastbound to Kennedy station, westbound to West Mall (On-street transfer)

== Tributes to Honest Ed's ==
On November 1, 2016, a temporary tribute to the Honest Ed's discount store was installed at Bathurst station in response to the store's impending closure. The station's interior walls and exterior windows were decorated with retro-style signage and pun-filled slogans that mirrored Honest Ed's signature visual aesthetic. This tribute remained in place until the store's final day of operation on December 31, 2016.

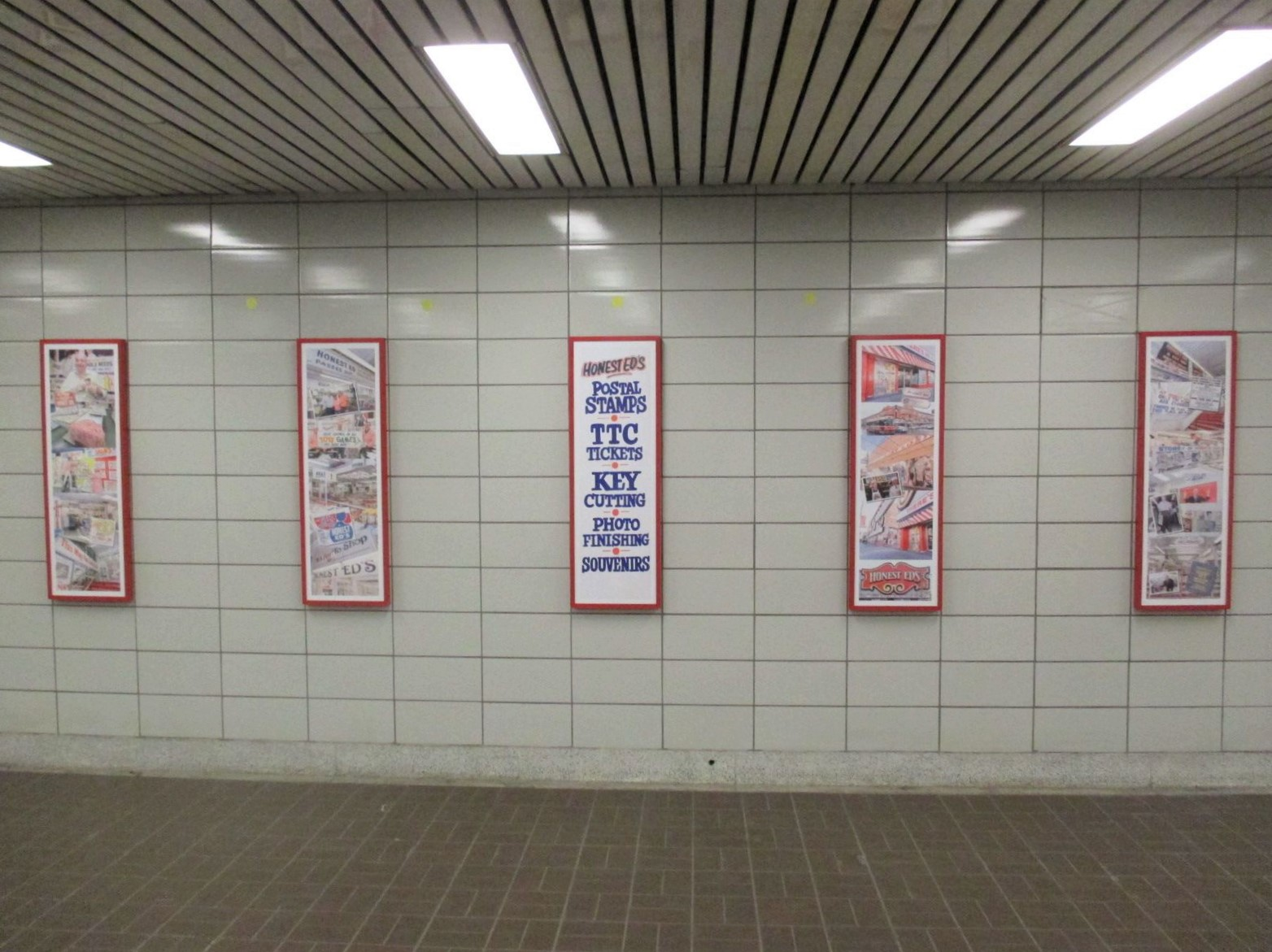
Permanent tribute to Honest Ed's

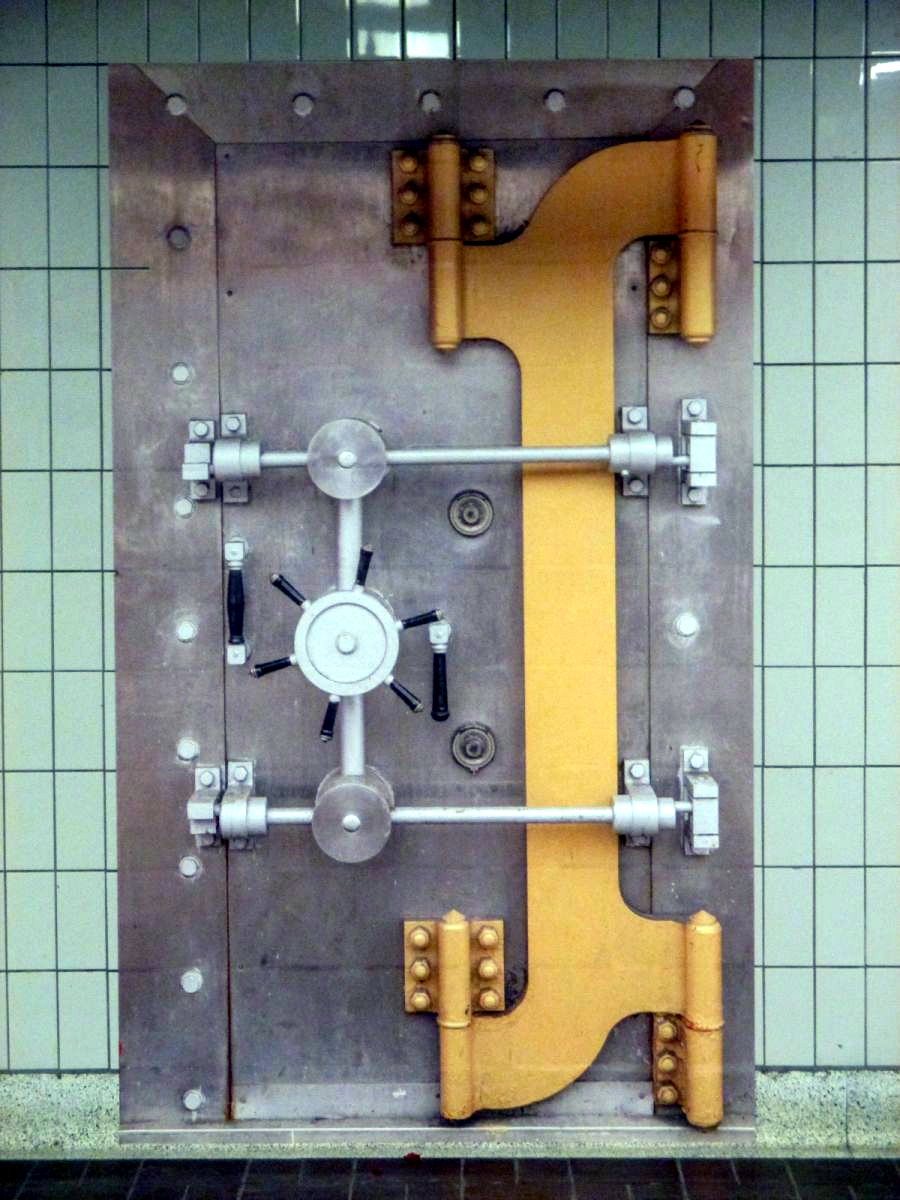
Mural of Ed's vault door

The TTC later installed a permanent tribute to Honest Ed's on the station's concourse level. This tribute comprises five vertical panels and a trompe-l'œil mural on opposite walls. The panels showcase photographs, storefront signs, and other memorabilia related to the store. The mural depicts the vault door that adorned the north façade of Honest Ed's. Two smaller images of the vault door are featured on one of the five panels.

== Parkette ==
Ed & Anne Mirvish Parkette
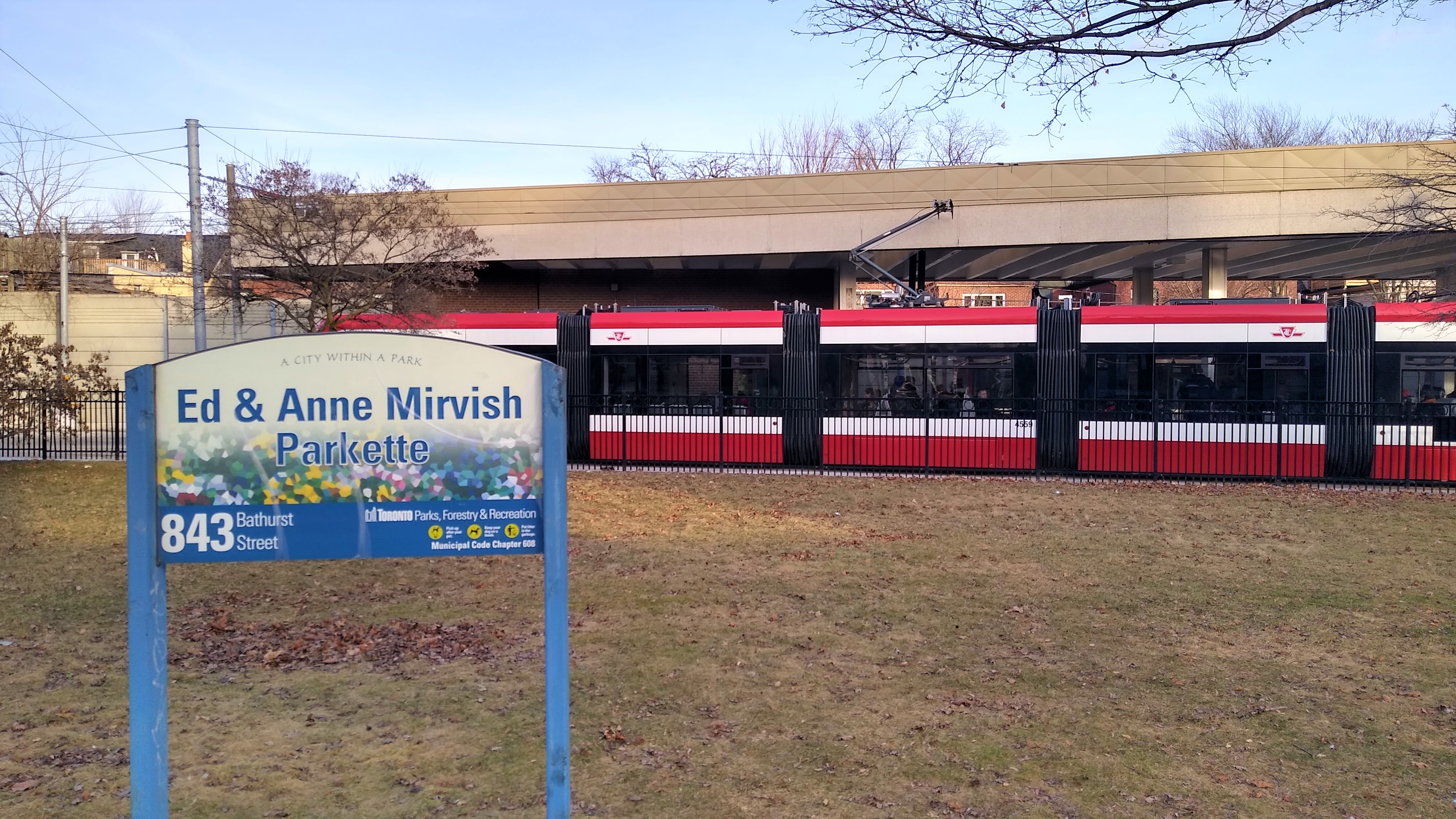
- Interactive map of Ed & Anne Mirvish Parkette
- Location: 819 Bathurst St, Toronto
- Coordinates: 43°40′00″N 79°24′41.4″W
- Operator: Toronto Parks

The piece of land between the main station building and Bathurst Street, encircled by the streetcar loop tracks, is used by the City of Toronto as a public park. Previously named "Bathurst Subway Parkette", a ceremony took place on September 22, 2008, to rename the park "Ed & Anne Mirvish Parkette". Ed Mirvish had been a well known local businessman whose landmark Honest Ed's discount store was located nearby at the southwest corner of Bloor Street and Bathurst Street. The Mirvish family had requested an appropriate commemoration to Ed, who had died on July 11, 2007 and the City of Toronto Parks, Forestry and Recreation Division recommended the renaming of this parkette as an opportunity to honour Ed and his wife Anne, who were both a positive influence on the community.
