= The Damned Trilogy =

Set of three novels by Alan Dean Foster

The Damned Trilogy is a set of three science fiction novels by American writer Alan Dean Foster (A Call to Arms, The False Mirror, and The Spoils of War), detailing human involvement in an interstellar war.

== Plot summary ==
Two major alien civilizations, the Amplitur (a slug-like species with telepathic and mind-controlling abilities – which they couch as "suggestions") and The Weave (a confederacy of more or less equal species), have been fighting a war for several millennia. The Amplitur are attempting to join all sentient species in what they call the "Purpose", an alliance they "guide" to some unknown (even to them) end. The Weave is a group of species allied in opposition to the Purpose.

Most of the fighting takes place on planetary surfaces, and is relatively restrained in terms of destruction, the purpose of the war being to convince and control one's opponents rather than destroy them. However, most sentient species in the galaxy have evolved to be incapable of committing violence against other sentients (violence of any sort being most uncivilized, but against another sentient being a [literally] unthinkable crime), which leaves a shortage of warriors on both sides. The Amplitur, with their mind-controlling abilities and therefore ease with which they control conquered populations, have gradually been pushing the Weave back for centuries and seem to be on track for final victory.

On a mission to find new resources and allies, a Weave scout ship discovers Earth circa late 20th/early 21st century and finds that humans are uniquely suited as allies, in that they have the ability to fight, are adaptable to a wide variety of environments, have few (or sometimes no) compunctions regarding war (humans having been fighting each other for all of their recorded history), and above all seem even more enthusiastic when their aggression is focused on non-humans. Eventually Weave xenopsychologists determine that Earth's fragmented continents resulted in a species that evolved to fight, compete, and kill for dominance. They surmise that all humans are born hunters and killers, but that intelligence is starting to drive them toward the abhorrence of violence that other "civilized" species consider normal.

When humans are unleashed upon the battlefield, all inhibitions against killing other humans are disregarded. Humans have no problem hunting and slaughtering non-humans, and some seem to enjoy it. This is appalling to the civilized races of the Weave, but they cannot deny the efficacy of human combat troops.

Humans have the potential to become fearsome allies for the Weave and are also physiologically immune to the Amplitur mind control abilities.

After the Weave scouts convince volunteers (mercenaries) from Earth to join the war, the tide turns for the Weave and the main conflict towards the end of the series becomes a question of what will happen to the new warriors when the war finally ends if they have not become more civilized (and therefore, less effective allies). Throughout the book the humans are greatly feared by the rest of the Weave because of the human race's violent tendencies. (The rest of the galaxy's species lived in harmony amongst themselves before they developed enough to reach out into space.)

The first book deals with the Weave and humans trying to come to terms with each other, the first humans begin to fight in the war and the Amplitur attempt to capture Earth to deny the Weave their new allies.

The second book details the outcome of the capture of some humans by the Amplitur, who genetically engineer them to become susceptible to the Amplitur telepathic abilities. Weave scientists' attempt to reverse this engineering on the repatriated humans had the (unknown to the Amplitur and Weave alike) side effect of giving those humans mind-control talents as well. When the newly-returned humans realize their abilities, they form a secret society called the Core, whose existence is unknown to even other humans. They fight the war telepathically as well as physically.

The third book, set a few hundred years later, follows the research of a Wais scientist, Lalelelang, studying humans. The Wais are a delicate, highly civilized ornithorp race and are the most averse to violence of all the Weave species. Some members of this race can be shocked into a catatonic state at the mere sight of violence, which makes Lalelelang's friends, family, and colleagues all the more fearful for her chosen subject of study. During the course of her research, she comes to the conclusion that unless humans can be 'civilized' somehow, they will eventually turn on the rest of the Weave races once the war is over. She embarks on a quest to keep this from happening, and is joined by one of the descendants of the 'altered' humans from the second book. Unknown to Lalelelang, she will discover shocking things about not only the telepathic humans, but a couple of alien species from the first two books as well as herself.

Significant parts of the action of the novels take place between the various non-human species that make up both The Weave and the Amplitur's allies, giving an outside perspective of "normal" human interactions and events as the author's apparent commentary on current events.

== Books ==
=== A Call to Arms (1991) ===
A Call to Arms was published by Ballantine Books on April 1, 1991. Kirkus Reviews criticized it as having no plot or action.

=== The False Mirror (1992) ===
The False Mirror was published by Ballantine Books on April 1, 1992. Publishers Weekly praised the book for being an improvement over the first and having more depth.

=== The Spoils of War (1993) ===
The Spoils of War was published by Ballantine Books on April 1, 1993.
