= Common Tasks for Assessment =

Educational programme in South Africa

The Common Tasks for Assessment (or CTAs) are standardized tests that are part of a compulsory educational programme in South Africa. All Grade 9 students have to complete tasks, which comprise 25% of their year mark. At the end of Grade 9 they can decide to leave school without matriculation or to continue until grade twelve. The program consists of two categories, A and B.

The first section consists of a series of tasks, which are divided into several activities. The work is solely related to knowledge gained in the senior phase of education, which starts in grade seven and ends with the successful completion of grade nine. After this the pupil begins the FET (Further Education and Training) phase which consists of the three remaining school years. Section A of the CTA is marked by the teacher and handed back to the pupil. For section B of the CTA, the pupils need only study what was asked in the first section, though for a subject such as mathematics it is advisable to have a thorough understanding of all work done in the year. Section B is also set by the South African Department of Education and is a national exam (in the traditional sense of the word).

It is very important for each student to complete all assignments in the year as some of them are placed in a portfolio, which is reviewed and moderated by Department officials on a regular basis. Furthermore, the portfolio contributes most of the year's marks (75%) whereas the CTA (as mentioned above) contributes only 25%. Thus a student cannot solely rely on the CTAs to pass grade nine. Students must work hard during the school year and hands in all assignments.

As of 2012 the Departments stance on whether CTA will continue is unknown
