= Central Toronto Academy =

Canadian secondary school

Central Toronto Academy (formerly Central Commerce Collegiate Institute)
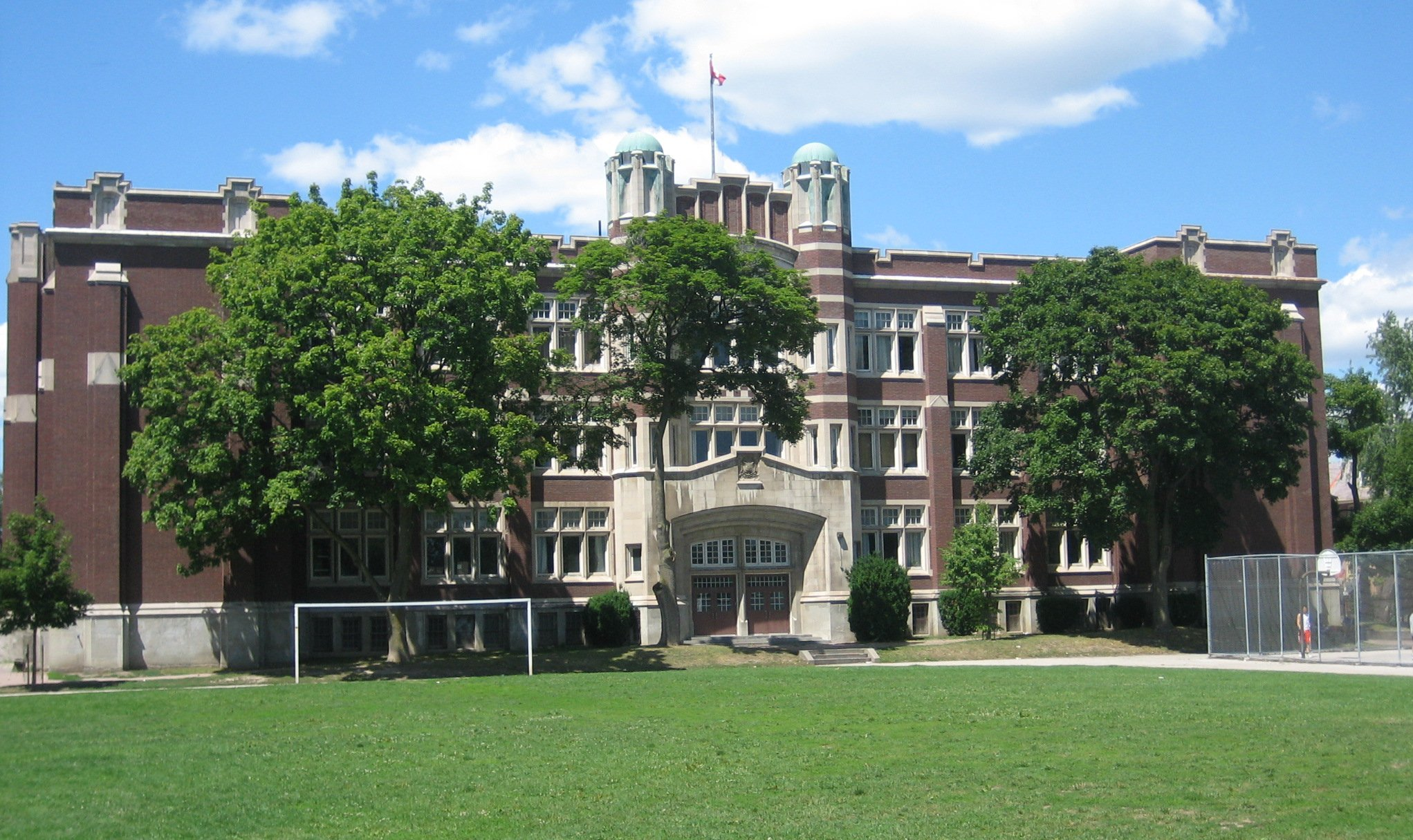

Location
- 570 Shaw Street; Toronto, Ontario, M6G 3L6; Canada; 43.657691°N 79.421901°W

Information
- School type: High school
- Motto: Academics, Arts, Athletics
- Founded: 1911
- School board: Toronto District School Board (Toronto Board of Education)
- Superintendent: Louie Papathanasakis
- Area trustee: Alexis Dawson
- School number: 5805 / 899437
- Principal: Lesley Wallace
- Grades: 9–12
- Enrolment: 909 (June 30, 2022)
- Language: English
- Schedule type: Semestered
- Colours: Purple and silver
- Mascot: Wolf
- Team name: CTA Wolves
- Website: schoolweb.tdsb.on.ca/centraltorontoacademy/

Central Toronto Academy (CTA); formerly Central Commerce Collegiate Institute and originally High School of Commerce and Finance is a public, semestered secondary school in Toronto, Ontario, Canada. Located in the Palmerston-Little Italy neighbourhood, it is operated by the Toronto District School Board. Before 1998, the school was part of the former Toronto Board of Education.

The school was founded in 1911 as an offshoot of the Central Technical School. The eight commercial classes which had been taking place in Central Tech were first moved to King Edward Public School and then to Clinton Street Public School. In 1916, the classes were moved into a permanent home when the Collegiate Gothic Central High School of Commerce building opened as a school of business and commerce on Shaw Street. Over the years it has developed into a composite school that offers a broad range of programs, complemented by a full range of core academic subjects, computer classes, music, art, drama, and health and physical education. Courses are offered at the university, university/college and college levels for grade 12 students. Central Commerce Collegiate was renamed to Central Toronto Academy in September 2014.

== Sports ==
CTA is well known for its senior boys' basketball team which won the 2008 TBSSAA City Championship for "AAA" OFSAA. The team also received the bronze medal in the "AAA" OFSAA tournament. CTA is also well known for their REACH basketball program. More recently the senior boys' basketball team had won the gold medal in the 2017 "A" OFSAA tournament.

== Focus ==
In September 2014, Central Commerce Collegiate Institute was renamed Central Toronto Academy because of the change in the school's ethos, from a school focusing on business and commerce to one whose focus is on arts, academics, and athletics. The school also offers Advanced Placement courses.

The school was awarded a contract with the Ontario Power Authority in 2013 for a solar panel rooftop installation, solidifying the schools' environmentally conscious reputation and offering perspectives in renewable energies for students.

== See also ==
- Education in Ontario
- List of secondary schools in Ontario
