= List of tallest buildings in Ontario =

This list of tallest buildings in Ontario ranks skyscrapers and high rise buildings in the province of Ontario by height. Buildings in nine cities are included in this list; Hamilton, Kitchener, London, Markham, Mississauga, Niagara Falls, Ottawa, Toronto, and Windsor, each having buildings taller than 100 metres.

The tallest building in the province of Ontario is the SkyTower at Pinnacle One Yonge 351.4 metres (1,153 feet). Topped out in 2026, it is also the tallest building in Canada and the 95th tallest building in the world.

Due to height restrictions, tall skyscrapers are restricted in many parts of Ottawa, including the downtown core. Initially the height restrictions were put in place as to prevent any building from exceeding the height of the Peace Tower of Parliament Hill. The tallest building in that city now rises to 143 m (469 ft).

In recent years, a development boom has caused many cities, that historically haven’t had tall buildings or dense urban cores, to densify and construct taller buildings like Kitchener, Windsor, Markham, etc.

== Buildings over 100 meters ==
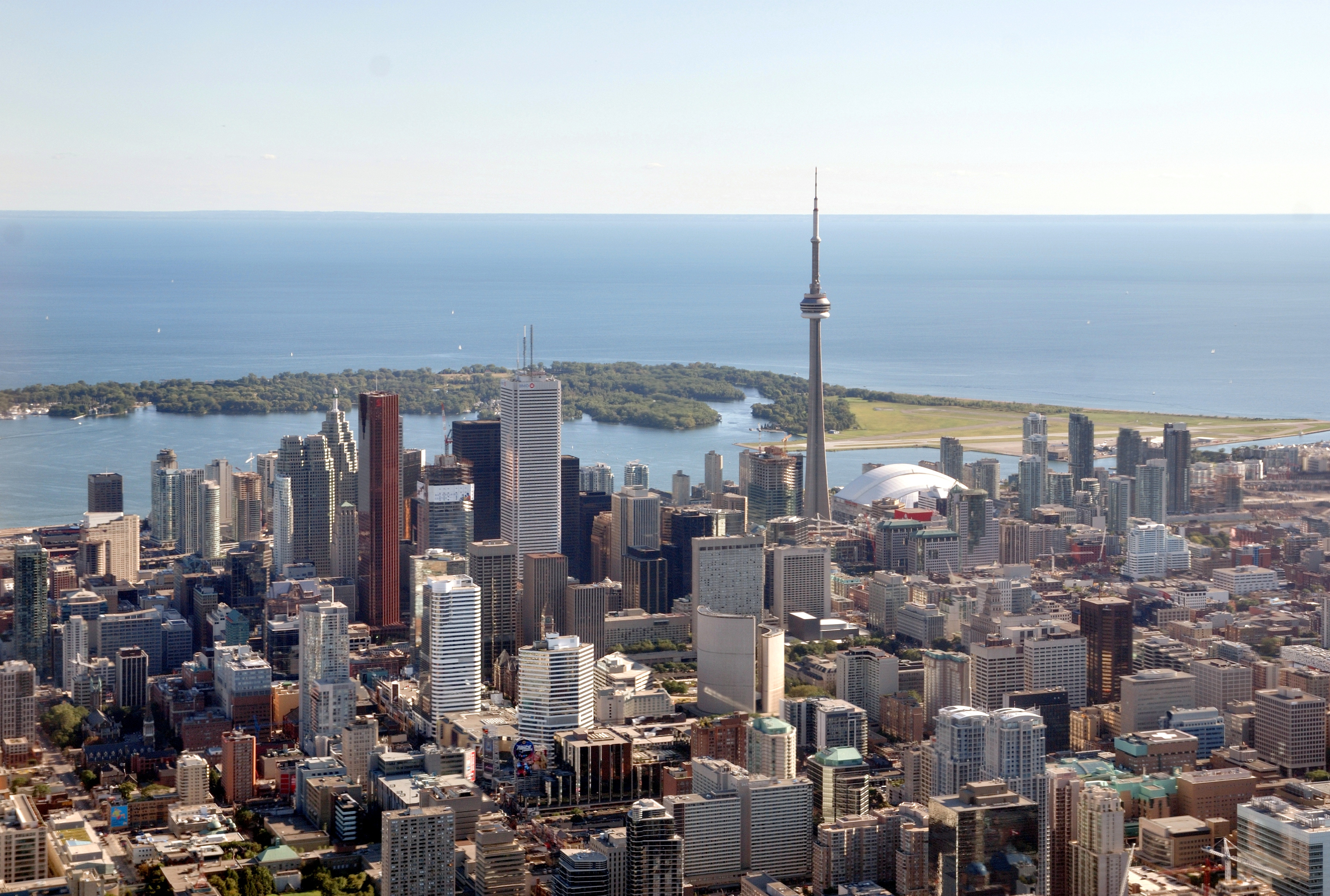
Toronto, home to the tallest building in Canada.

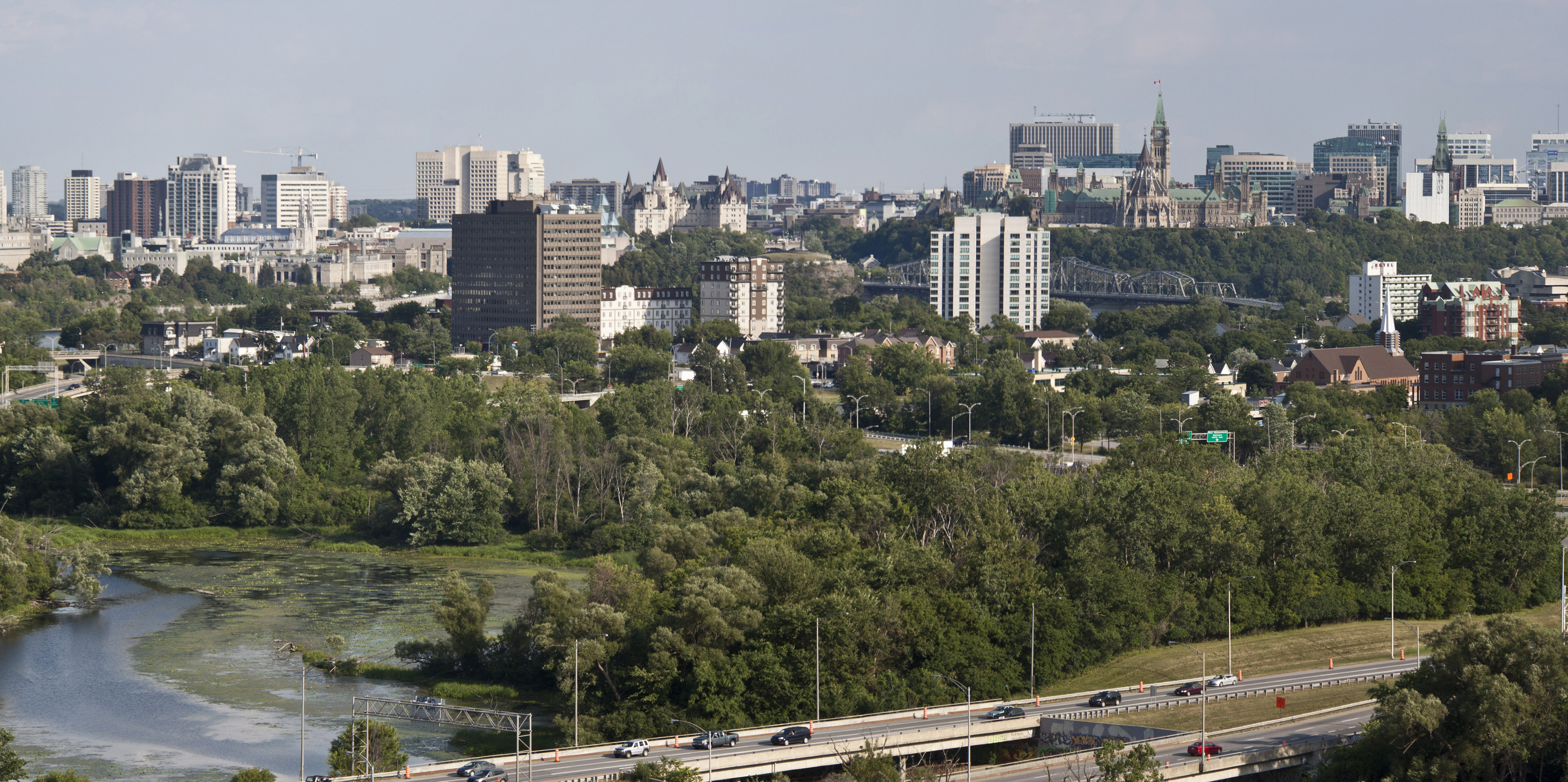
Ottawa, Canada's capital city.

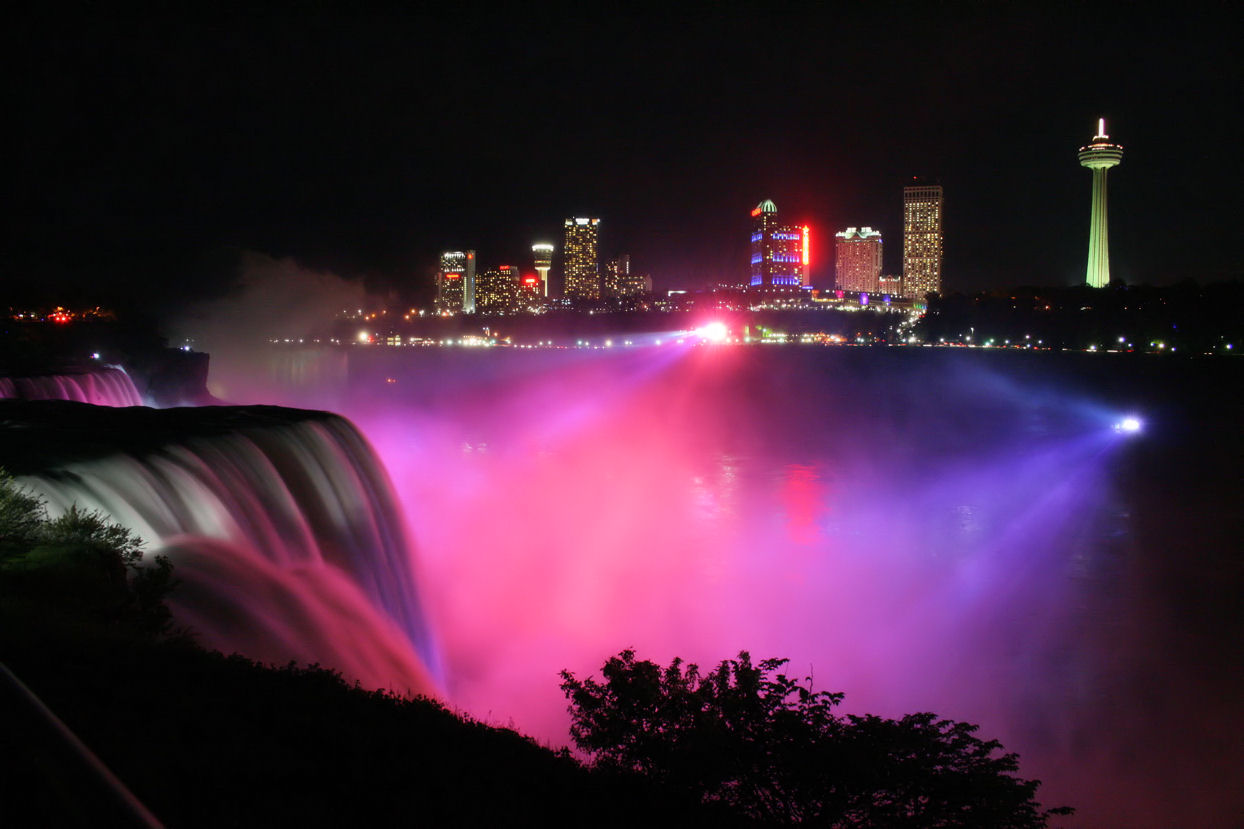
Niagara Falls is home to the tallest hotel in Canada.

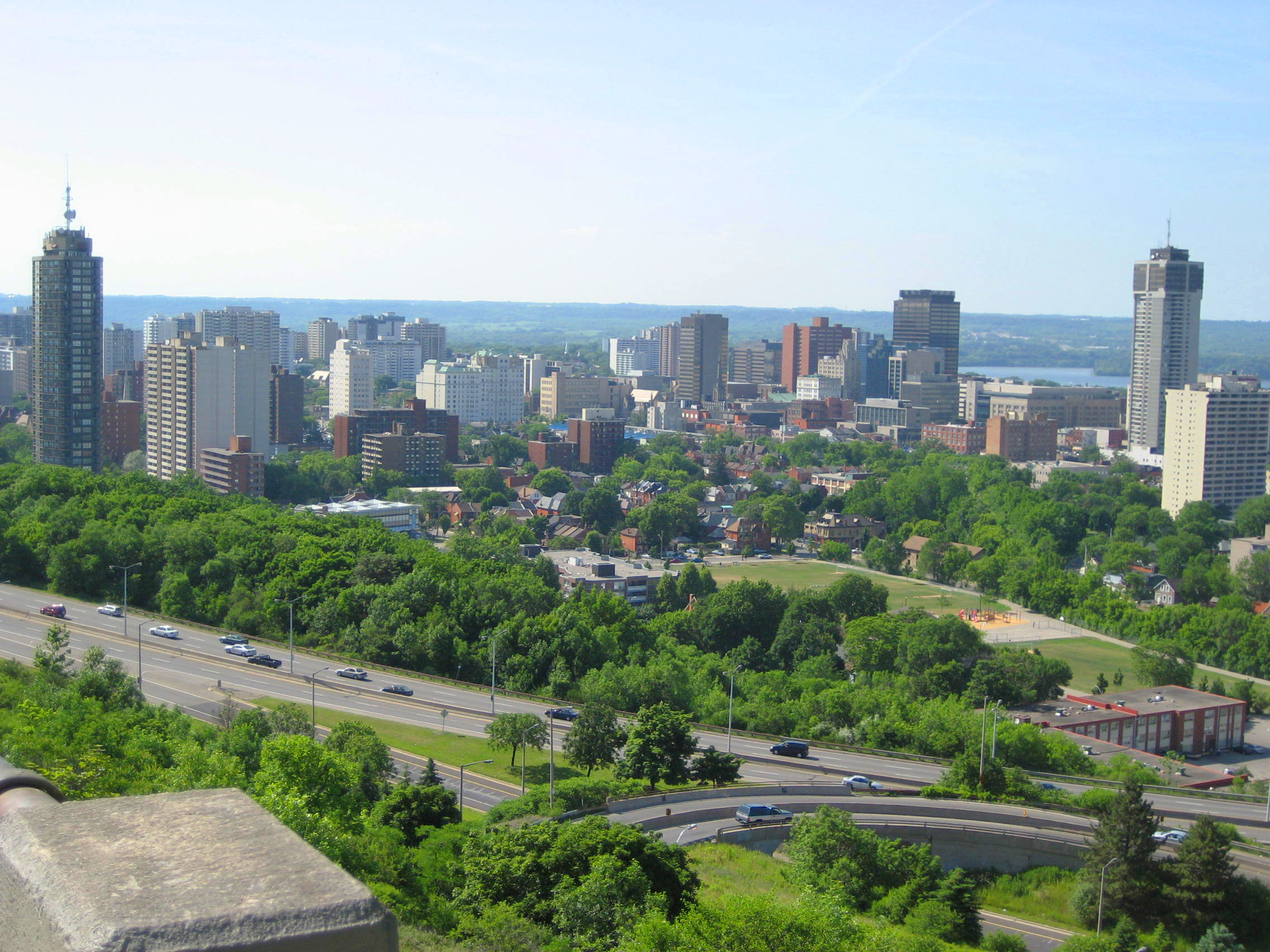
Hamilton is home to Ontario's 59th tallest building.

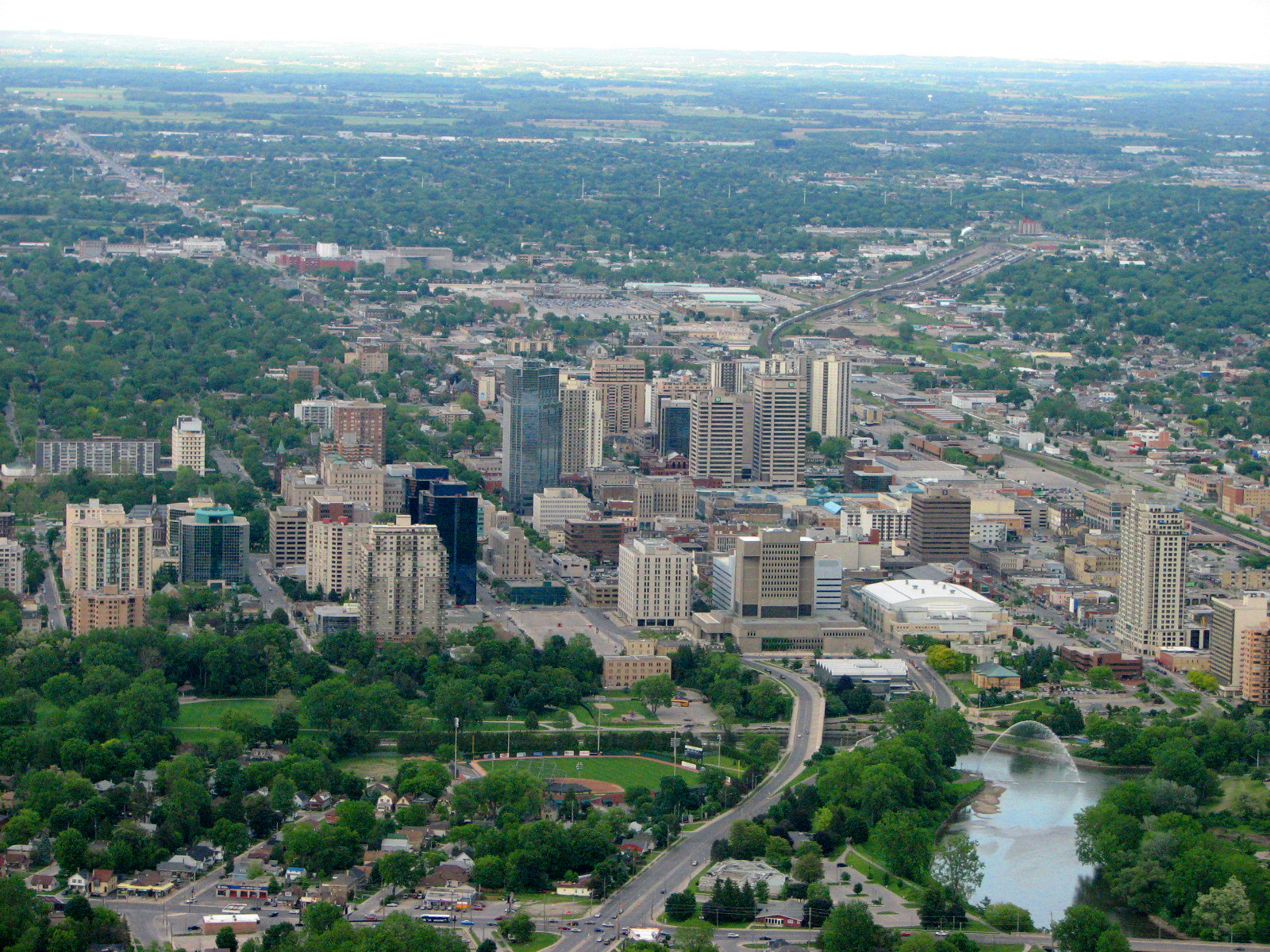
London is home to Ontario's 42nd tallest building.

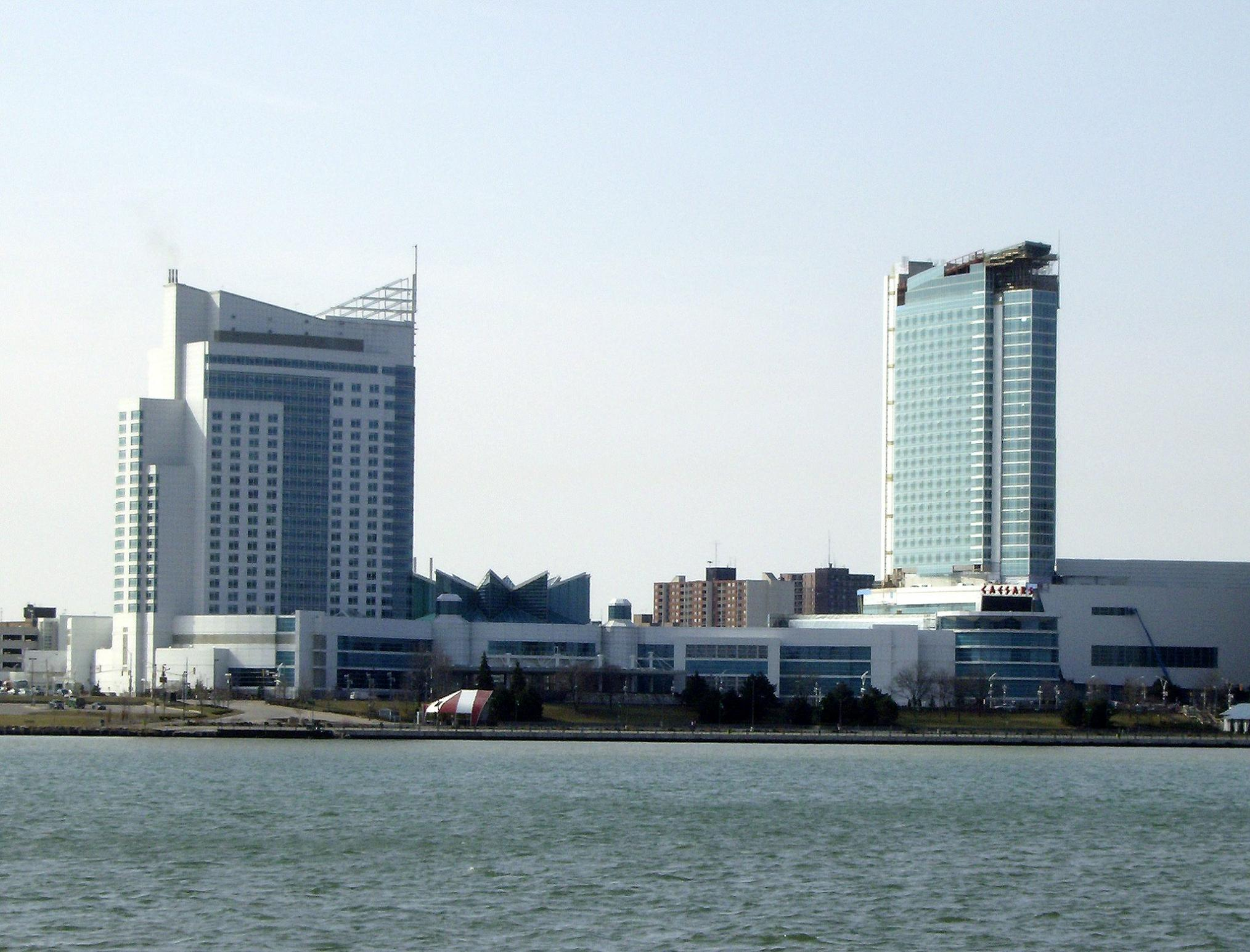
Windsor, Ontario is the southernmost city in Canada.

This list ranks buildings in Ontario that stand between least 100 m (328 ft) tall, based on CTBUH height measurement standards. This includes spires and architectural details but does not include antenna masts. An equal sign (=) following a rank indicates the same height between two or more buildings. Freestanding observation and/or telecommunication towers, while not habitable buildings, are included for comparison purposes; however, they are not ranked. One such tower is the CN Tower.

Rank	Name	Image	Height m / ft	Floors	Year	City	Notes	Ref
N/A	CN Tower (Note: The CN Tower is not a habitable building, but is included in this list for comparative purposes. Per a ruling by the Council on Tall Buildings and Urban Habitat, freestanding observation towers are not considered to be buildings, as they are not fully habitable structures.)		553 / 1,815	147	1976	Toronto	Third-tallest free-standing structure on land in the world; Tallest free-standing structure in the Western Hemisphere since 1975; Tallest free-standing structure on land in the world from 1975 to 2007; Contains no intermediate floors but has the height of 181 storeys	
1	First Canadian Place		298 / 978	78	1976	Toronto	Tallest building in Canada since 1976; 6th tallest building in the world at the time of its completion; Tallest building in the world outside of Chicago and New York City at the time of its completion; Tallest building completed in Ontario in the 1970s.; Formerly known as First Bank Tower	
2	The St. Regis Toronto		277 / 908	59	2011	Toronto	Tallest mixed-use building in Canada.; Second-tallest building in Canada by standard height.; Tallest building completed in Ontario in the 2010s.	
3	Scotia Plaza		275 / 902	68	1988	Toronto	Tallest building completed in Ontario in the 1980s.	
4	Aura		272 / 892	80	2014	Toronto		
5	Brookfield Place		261 / 856	53	1990	Toronto	Tallest building completed in Ontario in the 1990s.	
6	Commerce Court West		239 / 784	57	1972	Toronto		
7	Toronto-Dominion Tower		223 / 731	56	1967	Toronto	Tallest building completed in Ontario in the 1960s.	
8	Bay Adelaide Centre West Tower		218 / 715	51	2009	Toronto	Tallest building completed in Ontario in the 2000s.	
9	Ritz-Carlton Toronto		208 / 684	53	2011	Toronto		
10	Bay Wellington Tower		207 / 679	49	1991	Toronto		
11	Four Seasons Hotel and Residences West		205 / 650	55	2011	Toronto		
12	88 Scott		204 / 669	58	2018	Toronto		
13	CG Tower		193 / 663	61	2024	Vaughan	Tallest building in Ontario outside of Toronto	
14	Maple Leaf Square North Tower		186 / 610	54	2010	Toronto		
15=	Royal Trust Tower		183 / 600	46	1969	Toronto		
15=	RBC Centre		183 / 600	42	2009	Toronto		
16=	Royal Bank Plaza South		180 / 591	40	1979	Toronto		
16=	Absolute World South		180 / 589	56	2011	Mississauga	Second tallest building in Ontario outside of the city of Toronto. Also 3rd Tallest skyscraper in a suburban city in North America.	
17	Hilton Niagara Falls Tower 2		177 / 580	58	2009	Niagara Falls	Tallest building in Ontario outside of the Greater Toronto Area. Tallest hotel in Canada.	
18	One King Street West		176 / 578	51	2005	Toronto	Tallest completed residential skyscraper in Toronto.	
19	Maple Leaf Square South Tower		174 / 571	50	2010	Toronto		
20	44 Charles Street West		166 / 545	51	1972	Toronto	25th-tallest building in Canada.	
21	Quantum 2		165 / 541	51	2008	Toronto		
22	Residences of College Park		163 / 535	51	2006	Toronto		
23	Success Tower		162 / 531	54	2009	Toronto		
24	Absolute World North		161.2 / 529	50	2012	Mississauga		
25	Skylon Tower		158.5 / 520	-	1965	Niagara Falls	Tallest freestanding structure in Ontario when completed in 1965. Overtaken by the Toronto-Dominion Centre in 1967.	
25=	The Uptown Residences		158 / 518	48	2011	Toronto		
26	Festival Tower		157 / 514	42	2010	Toronto		
27	TD Waterhouse Tower		154 / 504	39	1985	Toronto		
28	35 Mariner		153 / 503	49	2005	Toronto		
28=	Montage		153 / 502	48	2009	Toronto		
29	The 250		151 / 494	35	1992	Toronto	Atop the Toronto Eaton Centre.	
30=	Two Bloor West		149 / 488	34	1973	Toronto		
30=	X Condominium		149 / 488	45	2010	Toronto		
31=	West One		148 / 486	49	2007	Toronto		
31=	Simcoe Place		148 / 486	33	1995	Toronto		
32	Residences of College Park South		147 / 482	45	2008	Toronto		
33	Exchange Tower		146 / 479	30	1983	Toronto		
34	Commerce Court North		145 / 476	34	1931	Toronto	Tallest building completed in Ontario in the 1930s.; Tallest building in Canada from 1930 to 1962.	
35	Simpson Tower		144 / 472	33	1968	Toronto		
36	Claridge Icon		143 / 469	45	2022	Ottawa	Tallest building in the National Capital Region.; Tallest building in Ontario outside of the Golden Horseshoe.	
36=	SP!RE		143 / 469	43	2007	Toronto		
37	Cadillac Fairview Tower		142 / 466	36	1981	Toronto		
37	One Park Tower		142 / 466	38	2008	Mississauga		
38	Murano South		140 / 459	41	2009	Toronto		
38=	Pantages Tower		140 / 458	46	2003	Toronto		
39	The Met Condos		139 / 456	43	2007	Toronto		
40=	CASA		138 / 453	45	2009	Toronto		
40=	Palace Place		138 / 453	46	1991	Toronto		
40=	Palace Pier		138 / 453	46	1978	Toronto		
41	Oxford Tower		137 / 449	33	1979	Toronto		
42	Centro Tower B		135.4 (444)	40	2026	London	Tallest building in London.	
42=	Sheraton Centre Hotel		135 / 443	43	1972	Toronto	Tallest all-hotel building in Toronto.	
43	Two Bloor East		134 / 439	34	1974	Toronto		
44	Ernst & Young Tower		133 / 437	31	1991	Toronto		
44=	N1/N2		133 / 436	41	2007	Toronto		
45	Empire Tower		130 / 427	28	2005	Toronto		
46	Dundee Place		129 / 424	31	1991	Toronto		
46=	Leaside Towers I		129 / 423	44	1970	Toronto		
46=	Leaside Towers II		129 / 423	44	1970	Toronto		
47=	Canadian Pacific Tower		128 / 420	32	1974	Toronto		
47=	Metro Hall West		128 / 420	27	1992	Toronto		
47==	DTK Condos		128 / 420	39	2021	Kitchener	Tallest building in Kitchener-Waterloo.	
48=	Landmark Place		127 / 417	43	1974	Hamilton	Tallest building in Hamilton.	
48=	Pinnacle A		127 / 417	40	2006	Toronto		
48=	18 Yonge		127 / 417	39	2006	Toronto		
48=	Westin Harbour Castle South Tower		127 / 417	38	1975	Toronto		
49	Marriott Hotel/Plaza 2 Apartments		126 / 415	41	1975	Toronto		
49=	Verve		126 / 413	39	2008	Toronto		
49=	Quantum		126 / 413	37	2007	Toronto		
49=	Crystal Blu		126 / 413	34	2010	Toronto		
50=	Chicago		125 / 410	35	2010	Mississauga		
50=	Sun Life Centre East Tower		125 / 410	28	1984	Toronto		
51	Yonge Eglinton Centre I		124 / 408	30	1974	Toronto		
51=	Royal York Hotel		124 / 407	28	1929	Toronto		
52	10 Navy		123 / 402	40	2005	Toronto		
53	Solstice		121 / 397	37	2008	Mississauga		
54	Embassy Suites Hotel Niagara Falls		118 / 387	42	2003	Niagara Falls		
55	One London Place		113.4 / 372	24	1992	London		
56	The Park Mansion		112.4 / 369	36	1990	Mississauga		
57	Place de Ville C		112 / 367	29	1972	Ottawa		
57=	Absolute Vision		112 / 367	35	2009	Mississauga		
58	Caesars Windsor Augustus Tower		111 / 364	27	2008	Windsor	Tallest building in Windsor.	
59	Minto Metropole		109 / 354	32	2004	Ottawa		
60	20/22 George St.		106 / 348	32	2019	Hamilton		
60=	Charlie West		106 / 348	31	2021	Kitchener		
60=	The Dale Tower 1		106 / 348	32	2020 (Topped-out)	Ottawa		
61	Le Parc		104 / 341	30	1988	Ottawa		
62	100 King Street West		103 / 338	25	1973	Hamilton		
63=	World on Yonge Condos - North Tower		102 / 335	32	2014	Markham	Tallest buildings in Markham.	
63=	World on Yonge Condos - South Tower		102 / 335	32	2014	Markham	Tallest buildings in Markham.	

== See also ==
- List of tallest buildings in Canada
- List of tallest buildings in Quebec

=== By city ===
- List of tallest buildings in Hamilton, Ontario
- List of tallest buildings in London, Ontario
- List of tallest buildings in Ottawa–Gatineau
- List of tallest buildings in Mississauga
- List of tallest buildings in Niagara Falls, Ontario
- List of tallest buildings in Greater Sudbury
- List of tallest buildings in Toronto
- List of tallest buildings in the Waterloo Regional Municipality
- List of tallest buildings in Windsor, Ontario
