= Burano (building) =

Residential building in Toronto, Canada

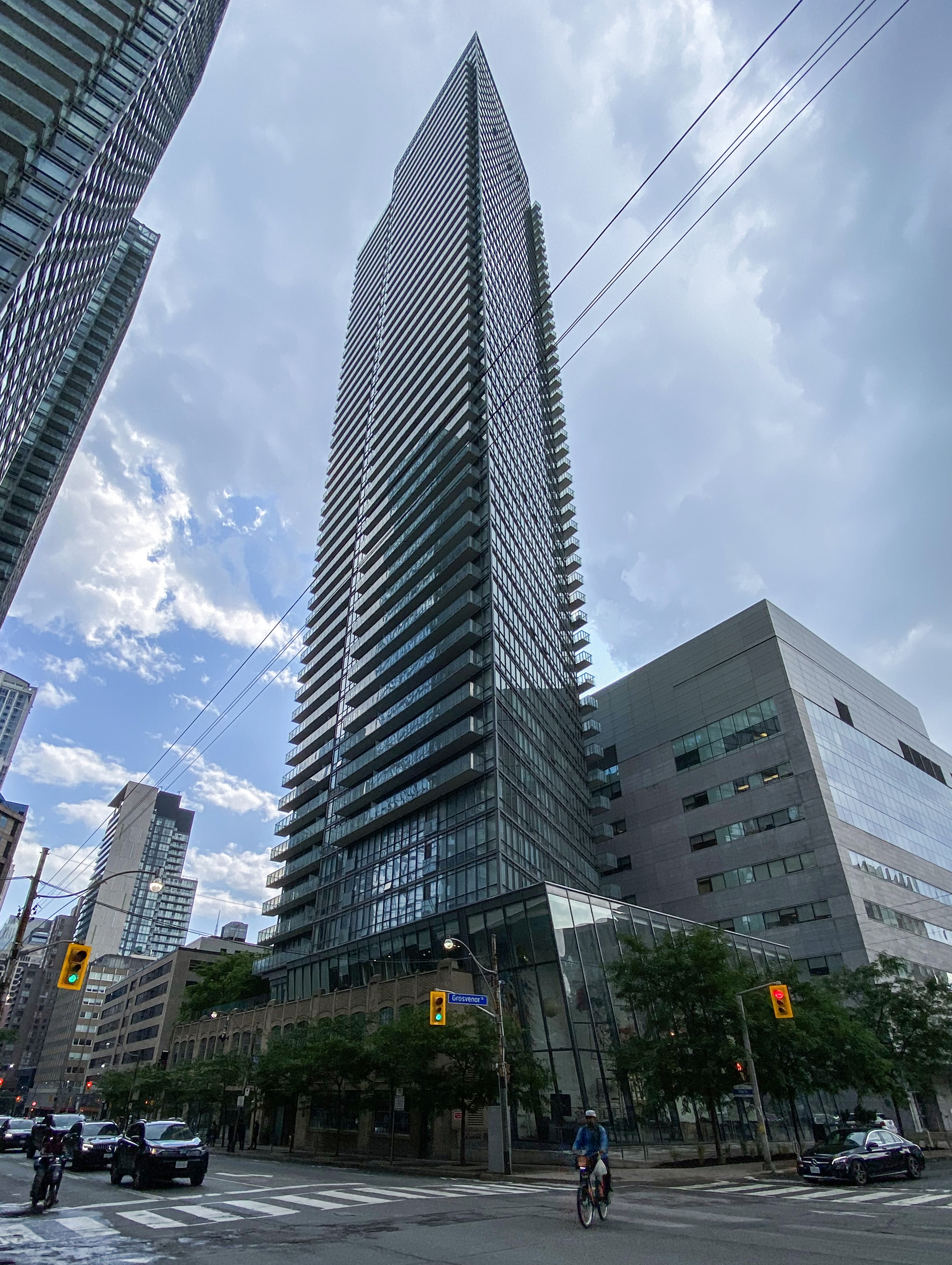
- The north facade of the Burano building

General information
- Type: Residential
- Location: 832 Bay Street; Toronto, Ontario
- Coordinates: 43°39′42″N 79°23′11″W
- Completed: July 2012

Height
- Roof: 163 m (535 ft)

Technical details
- Floor count: 50
- Floor area: 38,803 m^{2} (417,670 sq ft)

Design and construction
- Architect: Peter Clewes of architectsAlliance
- Developer: Lanterra Developments

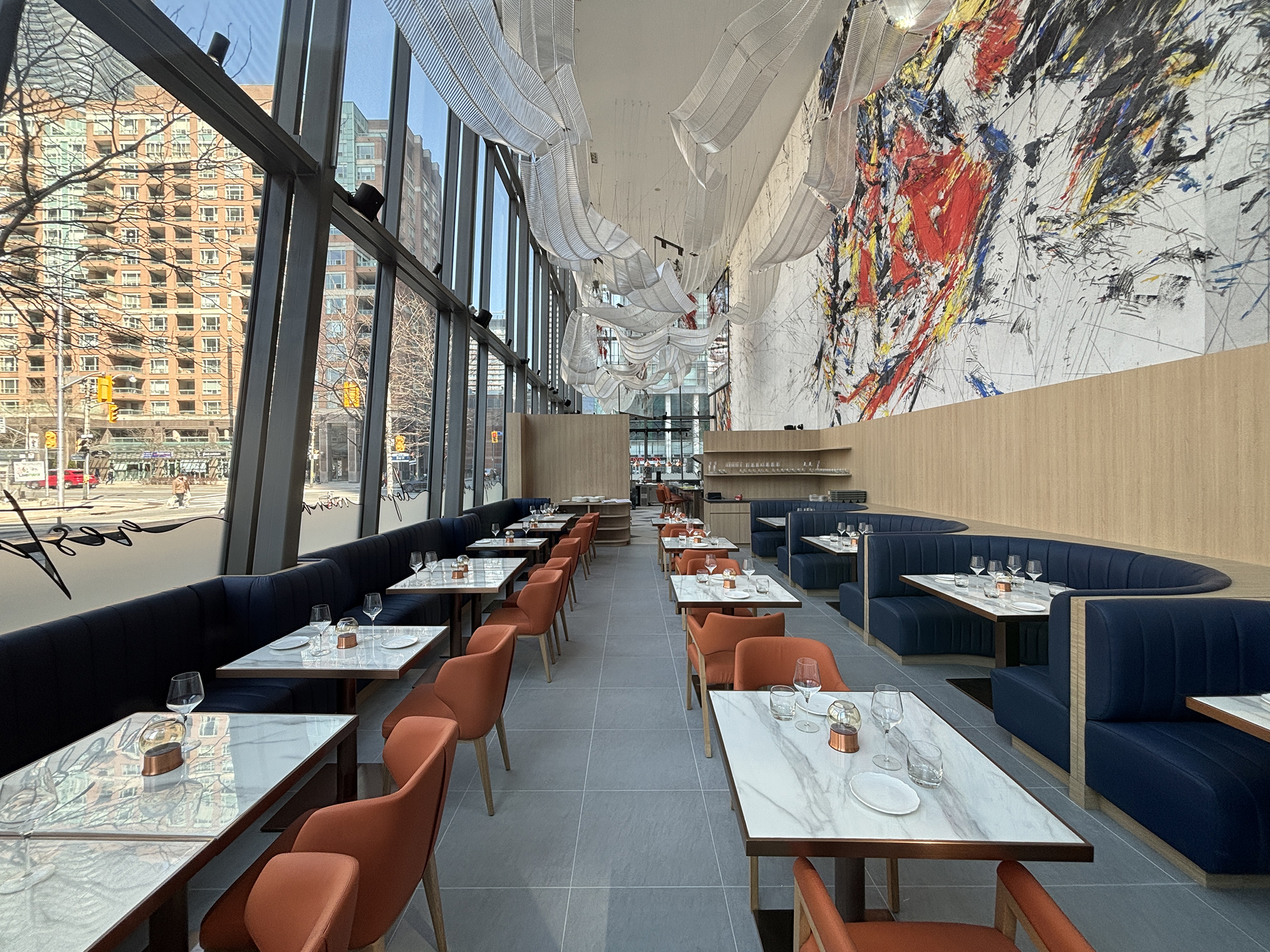
Burano building has a three storey retail space, with a large mural on the original structure's wall

Burano is a 50-storey, 163-metre-tall (535 ft) residential high-rise condominium complex on Bay Street between Grenville St. and Grosvenor St. in the Discovery District of Downtown Toronto, Ontario, Canada. The redevelopment of the site was part of a period of urban renewal of the Toronto financial district in the early 21st century. Toronto City Planning stated that the Burano has "significantly contributed to the improvement of the streetscape and the public realm."

== History ==
Burano was financed by Lanterra Developments. It was designed by Peter Clewes of architectsAlliance, and is located across the street from Murano, another one of his Toronto projects. It is named for an island in the venetian lagoon

The Burano was designed to be built within the footprint of a heritage structure: a 1925 auto dealership which had been designated a heritage structure in 1999. By 2010, the foundations were complete and the building was under construction.

As well as architectural elements from the former building, public art was also incorporated into the Burano, including a large abstract fresco created by Italian artist Sandro Martini installed in the building's atrium, on the side of the heritage building.

== McLaughlin Motor Car Showroom ==
Construction of the Burano preserved the facade of the former Samuel McLaughlin's McLaughlin Motor Car Showroom, a two-storey heritage building designated in 1999 under the Ontario Heritage Act. Built in 1925 as the R.S. McLaughlin Building, the Gothic Revival building was one of the first automobile dealerships in Toronto, and remained continuously occupied by car dealerships for eighty-two years. Despite its long history, that use ended as part of a reorganization and consolidation of the car dealership industry in Canada.

Due to the soft soil at the site, and to facilitate excavation, the historic facade was dismantled and stored off-site during construction of the seven-floor underground garage. After the garage and foundation appropriate for the fifty floors above ground were completed, the facade was reconstructed, incorporating the important heritage components.

The historic building is marked with a plaque, placed in 2013 by Heritage Toronto.

== See also ==
- Peter Clewes
- Murano
- SP!RE
- Casa Condominio Residenza
- X the Condominium
- List of tallest buildings in Toronto
