= Pier 27 (Toronto) =

Mixed-use development in Toronto, Ontario

Coordinates: 43.6417°N 79.3727°W

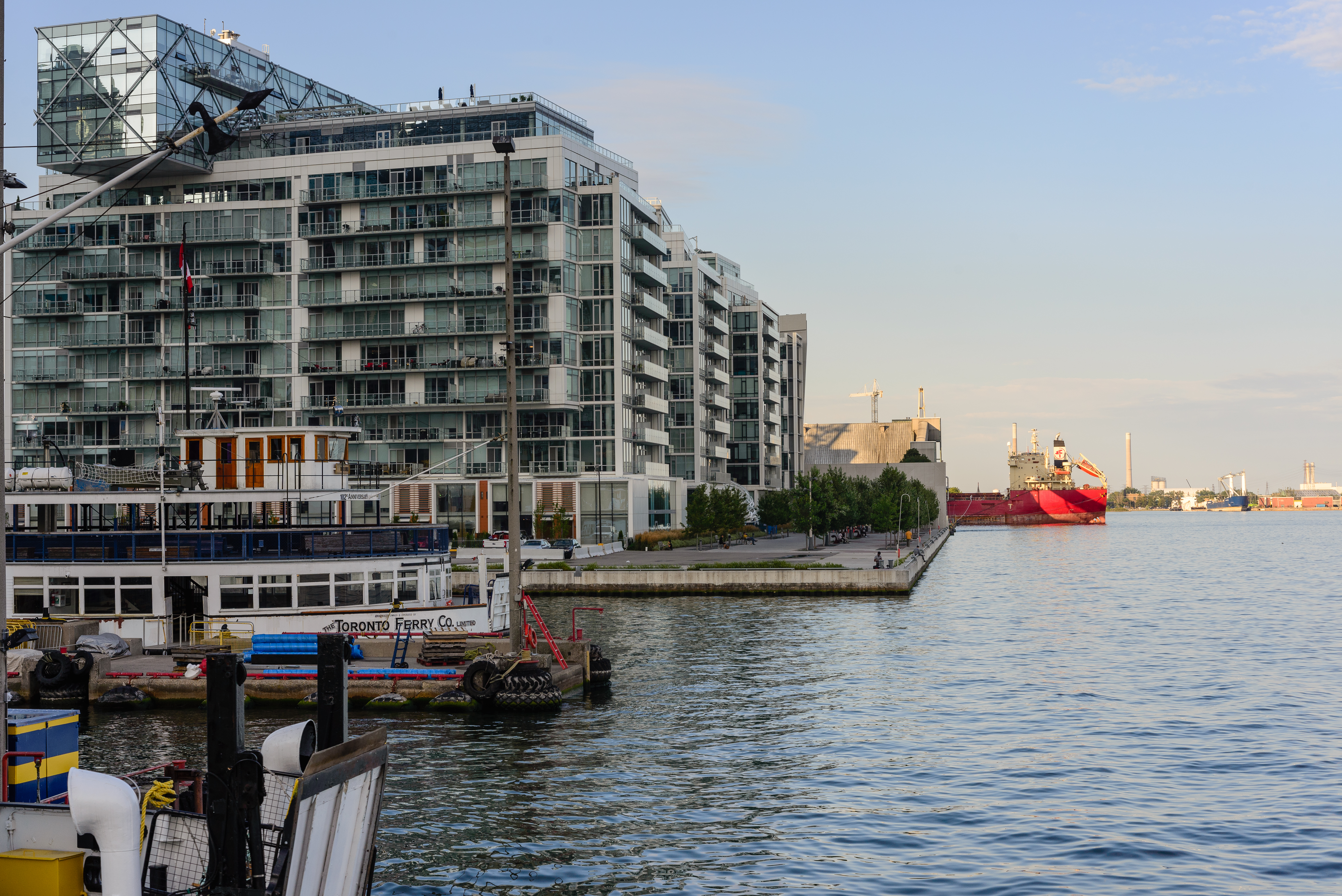
Waterlink at Pier 27

Pier 27 is a mixed-use residential and commercial development located in Toronto, Ontario, Canada. It is located on the Toronto waterfront at the foot of Yonge Street, along Queens Quay East. The site is approximately 3.6 hectares. The complex was developed by Cityzen Development Group in partnership with Fernbrook Homes, and designed by architects-Alliance. It includes multiple residential towers, ground-floor retail, and publicly accessible waterfront spaces.

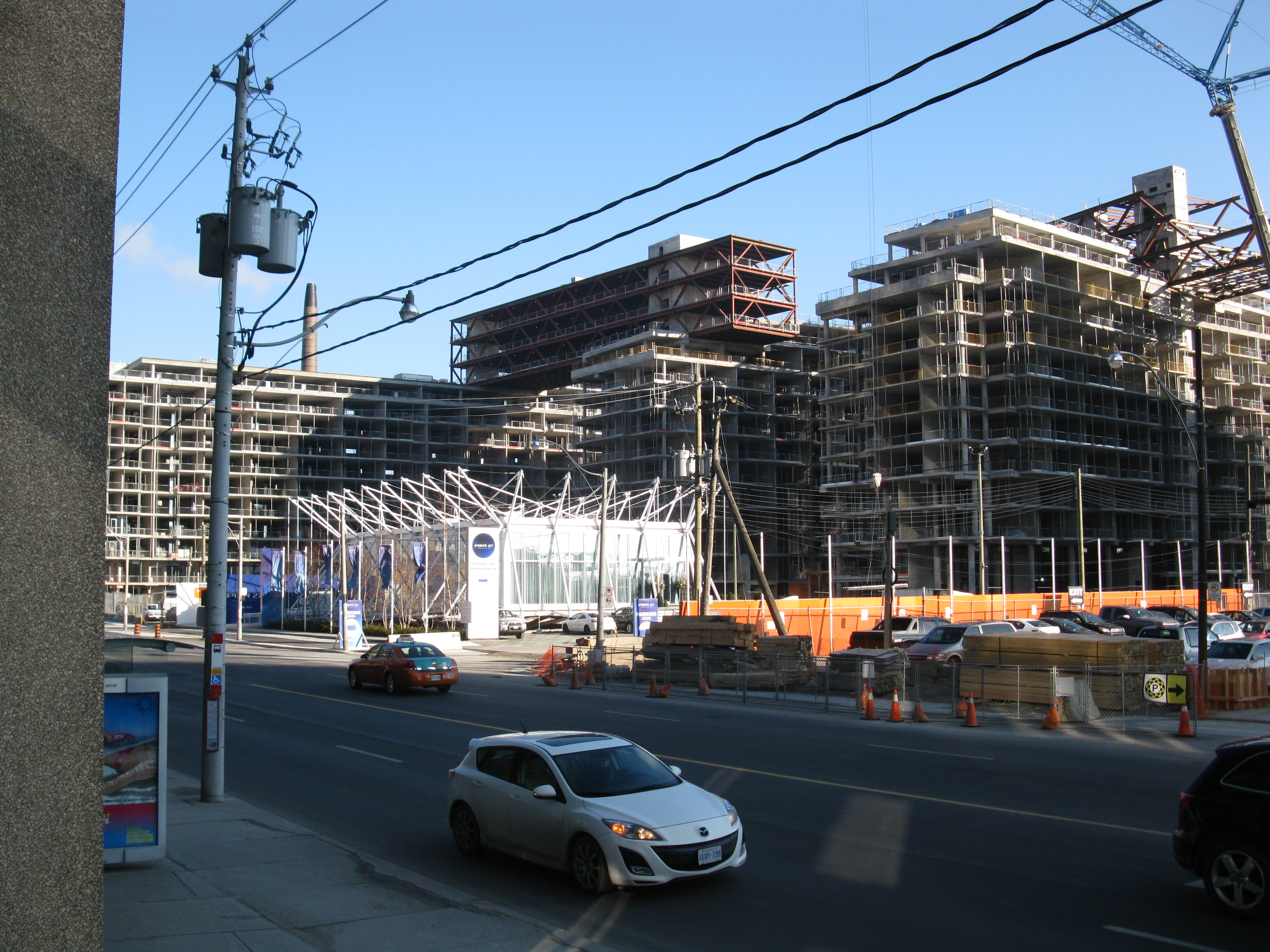
Waterlink at Pier 27 under construction

== Description ==
The complex includes Waterlink at Pier 27, which are 4 mid-rise buildings, 2 of each connected by a SkyBridge, located at 39 Queens Quay East, standing 14 floors, and 29 Queens Quay East, standing 14 floors. Additionally, Tower at Pier 27, located at 15 Queens Quay East, standing 35 floors.

== History ==
=== Early use (1910s–1980s) ===
The site was originally part of Toronto’s industrial and shipping infrastructure. In 1911, it was developed as part of the Port of Toronto’s pier system and served as a hub for marine freight, warehousing, and cargo loading. Toronto Harbour Commission set up under federal charter to manage Port of Toronto. Main asset was 809 hectares of land and water lots that the city turned over to the commission to manage.

In the 1960s, the Toronto Harbour Commission (THC) built port facilities, including Marine Terminal 27 to handle anticipated boom in shipping.

By 1986, the site is declared surplus.

In the summer of 1986, to clear debt, the Harbour Commission sells the 3.6-hectare site Marine Terminal 27 (MT27) to the developer Avro Group, headed by developer Phil Roth, for what city council called a "bargain basement" of $24.6 million.

In October 1986, the THC agrees to reopen negotiations with Avro in hopes of getting more money for the land.

In November 1986, the sale of the land, priced at $24.6 million, was met with opposition from Toronto City Council due to concerns over the low purchase price. Despite these objections, the sale proceeded.

In April 1987, as a result of the controversial land deal, council decides THC chair Fred Eisen, lawyer Andy Paton and Alderman Tom Clifford will not be reappointed.

== Redevelopment plans after the sale ==
The first proposal for the site, in March 1987, was to transform the warehouse on MT27 into a weekend antique market. Later, in April 1987, Avro’s plans for MT27 shifted for the site of a new Metro Hall.

By 1988, the location was considered a front-runner for proposed $230 million ballet-opera house. By this point, most of the land remained in Avro Group ownership, with a small portion owned by Torstar Corp. Philip Roth of Avro Group offered to donate some of the site for the arts complex, in return for increased density on the remainder, where he planned to build two office towers.

Towards the late 1980s to early 1990s, the City of Toronto placed a holding bylaw on waterfront lands during the city's Olympic bid, which froze development.

By 1996, Avro shifted focus to residential condominiums, and had the land rezoned for residential use, allowing about 1,400 condos.

By 2002, the OMB permitted 2,000 residential units at MT27 but restricted height to 14 storeys. This also included provisions such as the extension of Freeland Street southward into the site, ending in a cul-de-sac, and the construction of a 12 metre high separation wall between the development and the adjacent Redpath Sugar Refinery. These carried over to the final development of the site.

In 2003, the city granted site plan approval, however, later in that same year, Cityzen president Sam Crignano acquired the property from Avro Quay Ltd. (under Avro Group). Crignano said “When I got the call, Avro had already invested 20 years in getting approvals, but decided they didn’t want to go any further,”. “We tweaked the zoning, applying for minor variances”.

In 2005, Toronto Waterfront Revitalization Corp. (TWRC) attempted to buy the land but didn’t have enough money. Later in 2005, TWRC paid Torstar $12.5 million for a half hectare just east of Captain John's restaurant, which is now a parking lot.

On May 12, 2007, the current developers, Cityzen and Fernbrook Homes unveiled plans for a complex of five buildings with 1,500 to 2,000 units. Marketing was to begin early summer with construction of the first phase to be completed over the next 2 and a half years. Along with the condominiums, a 25-metre waterfront promenade was proposed (under the Avro by-law).

== Development phases and future phases ==
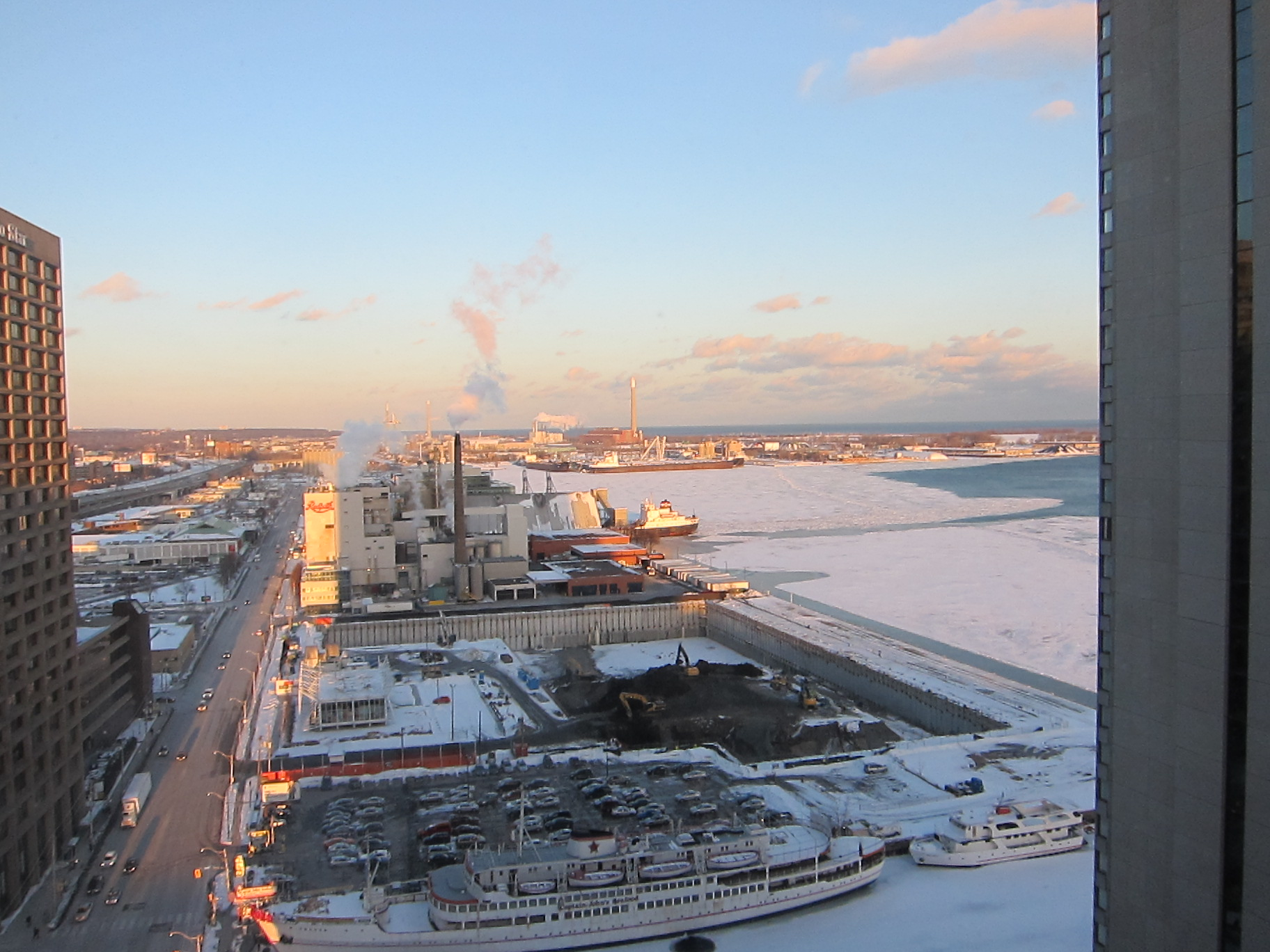
Waterlink at Pier 27 excavation site

Phase 1: Waterlink at Pier 27, included the completion of two mid-rise residential buildings, located at 29 Queens Quay East, at 14 floors, and 39 Queens Quay East, at 14 floors.

Phase 2: Tower at Pier 27 started construction in 2017, and was completed in 2020. This added a 35-storey residential tower located at 15 Queens Quay East.

=== Future phases ===
Phase 3 envisions two more towers, an 11-storey East Building, and a 45-storey West Building. Together, these will add approximately 585 condominium units, daycare facilities, street-level retail, and additional public amenities.

== Architecture and urban design ==
The complex was designed by Peter Clewes of architectsAlliance. The development features a combination of mid-rise and high-rise buildings connected by three-storey cantilevered bridge structures. These bridges are intended to reflect industrial gantries historically used to load cargo ships in Toronto Harbour, referencing the site's maritime heritage.

== Commercial uses ==
Retail spaces at grade level along Queens Quay East host cafes and convenience-oriented businesses.
