= Murano, Toronto =

Murano
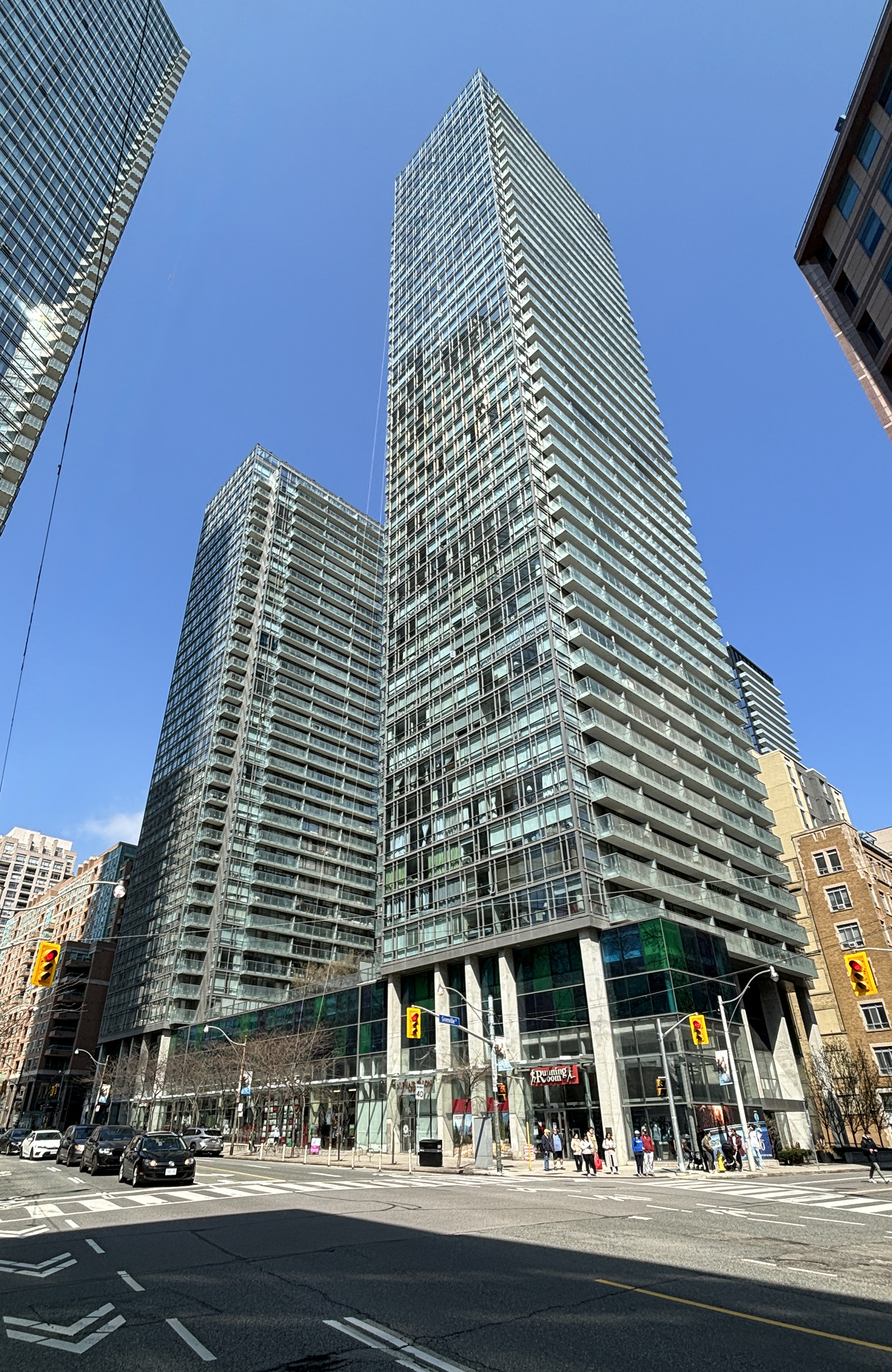
- View of Murano in 2024
- Interactive map of Murano

General information
- Status: Completed
- Type: Residential and retail
- Location: 825 Bay Street; Toronto, Ontario
- Coordinates: 43.662097°N 79.386027°W
- Estimated completion: 2010

Height
- Antenna spire: 140 m (460 ft)

Technical details
- Floor count: 45, 35

Design and construction
- Architect: Peter Clewes of architectsAlliance
- Developer: Lanterra Developments

Murano Condominiums is a two-tower residential high-rise condominium complex located alongside Bay Street, near the intersection of College Street in the Discovery District of downtown Toronto, Ontario, Canada. Construction of the North tower (37 Grosvenor Street) was completed in the winter of 2008/9. The South tower (38 Grenville Street) was completed in 2010. The North and South towers are joined by a two-storey podium with planned retail and recreational facilities, including a rooftop garden and glass public art feature.

== Architecture ==
Designed by Peter Clewes of architectsAlliance, Murano was marketed as a "fusion of art, architecture and glass". Toronto City Planning stated that the Murano, together with the neighboring Burano, has "significantly contributed to the improvement of the streetscape and the public realm".

Comparable Toronto structures designed by Clewes include SP!RE and Casa Condominio Residenza.

== Construction Problems ==
Since late 2010, panes of balcony glass have shattered and fallen to the street below. An occurrence on one of Toronto's hottest days on record (6 July 2012) resulted in the closure of Grosvenor Street and St. Vincent Lane. The North Tower lobby entrance was condemned by the City of Toronto pending the resolution of this problem. More glass fell on August 1 at 3 am and at midday. Police closed the northbound lane of Bay between Grosvenor and Grenville Streets, expecting the closure to be for a week.

For the first time, glass fell from the South Tower on August 15 at 11:30 AM, injuring a woman by slicing her wrist and leaving a puddle of blood where she was treated. “We don’t know why it’s happening, and continues to happen,” said Jim Laughlin, the city's deputy chief building inspector.

The developers replaced all tempered glass with laminated glass on balconies on both towers, and sealed the balconies. The sealing of the balconies resulted in a $20 million class action lawsuit by residents and owners of the condominiums against the developers, builders and architects in 2012.
