= Oxford Tower =

Oxford Tower can refer to:

- Oxford Tower (Edmonton)
- Oxford Tower (Toronto)
- Oxford Tower (Warsaw)
