= Four Seasons Hotel and Residences Toronto =

Luxury condominium and hotel

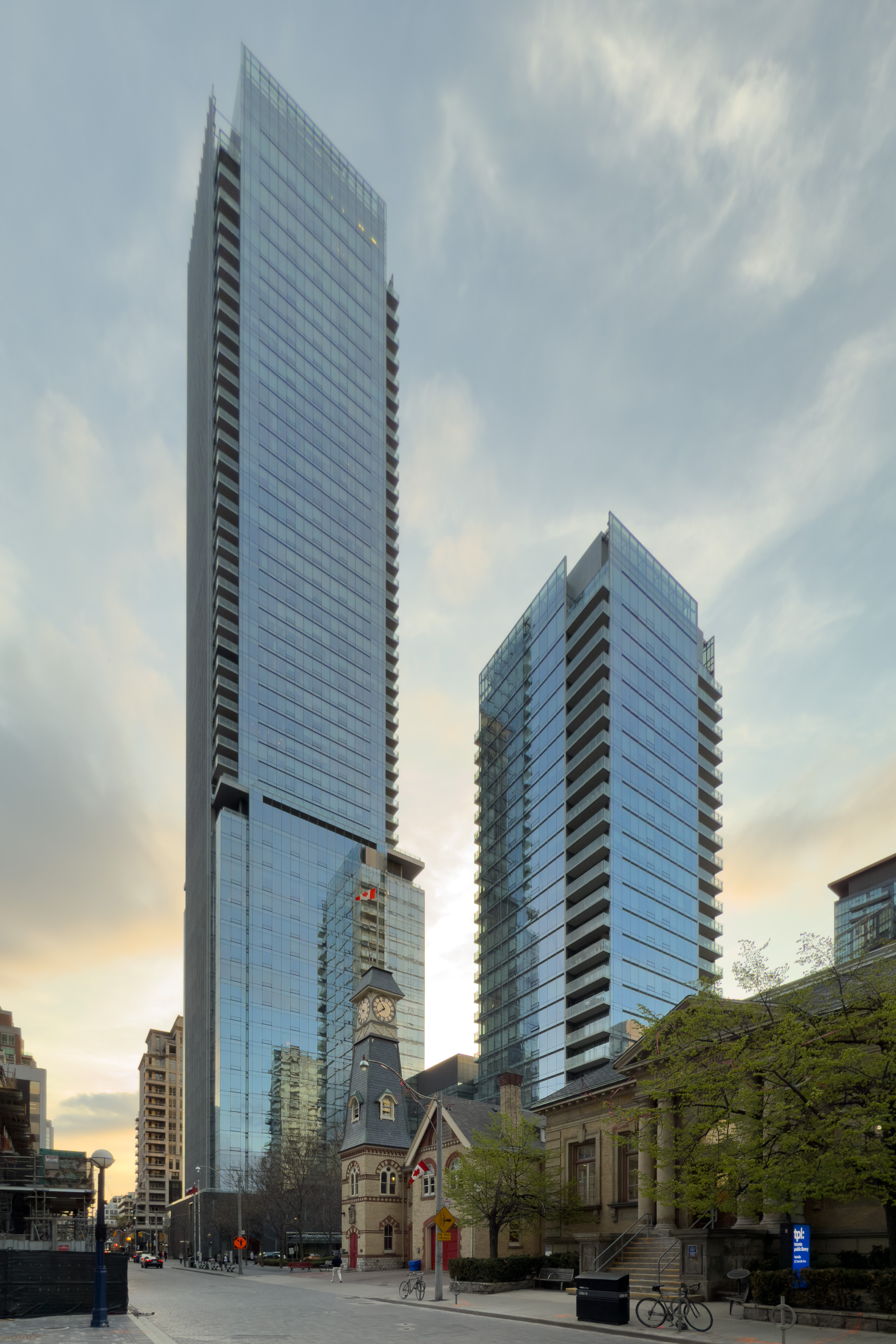
- The Four Seasons in 2025

General information
- Type: Hotel and residential
- Location: 60 Yorkville Ave. Toronto, Ontario
- Coordinates: 43°40′19″N 79°23′20″W
- Completed: 2012
- Owner: Shahid Khan

Height
- Roof: Hotel - 204 metres (669.3 ft); Residential - 125 metres (410.1 ft)

Technical details
- Floor count: 52 (hotel) and 26 (residential condo)
- Floor area: 78,429.29 m^{2} (844,205.9 sq ft)

Design and construction
- Architect: Peter Clewes of architectsAlliance
- Developer: Bay-Yorkville Developments

The Four Seasons Hotel and Residences Toronto is a complex consisting of a 204-metre, 55-storey residential condominium tower and a 125-meter, 30-storey luxury hotel tower in the Yorkville district of Toronto, Ontario, Canada, which opened on October 5, 2012. Located at 60 Yorkville Avenue, at its intersection with Bay Street, the complex is situated one block east of the former Four Seasons Hotel Toronto building at 21 Avenue Road.

The 55-floor complex contains 259 hotel rooms and 210 private condominium units in addition to a two-storey spa, Café Boulud and bar (by international restaurateur and chef Daniel Boulud), and glass-enclosed event spaces. It was designed by architectsAlliance, with Page and Steele as Architect of Record. The project was developed by Bay-Yorkville Developments Ltd. (a joint venture of Alcion Ventures, LP, Menkes Developments Ltd., and Lifetime Homes), and it uses the "Four Seasons" trademark under licence. The taller tower was initially the 10th tallest building in Toronto, but by 2017, its position had fallen to 17th as other taller buildings were completed. The site had previously been the Bay Ford Lincoln car dealership, and it is next door to Toronto Fire Services Station 312.

The penthouse, which occupies the entire 55th floor of the West Residence was sold for C$28 million in 2012, making it the most expensive condominium unit sold in Canada. Before the ribbon-cutting ceremony, Four Seasons Hotels chairman and founder Isadore Sharp proclaimed the new location as being "...in a category by itself, a true Four Seasons in our hometown, our flagship hotel. It is a landmark development for the city of Toronto".

== History ==
=== The Four Seasons Motor Hotel ===
The first Four Seasons-operated hotel in Toronto was The Four Seasons Motor Hotel, opened in 1961 at 415 Jarvis Street near Carlton. Built by architect Peter Dickinson, it operated as a motor inn before it was demolished and replaced by townhouses.

=== Inn on the Park ===
The next hotel operated by Four Seasons was the Inn on the Park, which opened in 1963. It became a Holiday Inn in the 1980s, and has since been demolished and replaced by the Lexus on the Park car dealership.

=== Four Seasons Sheraton Hotel ===
The Four Seasons Sheraton Hotel opened in 1972 as a joint venture between Four Seasons founder Issy Sharp and Sheraton. Unhappy with the partnership, Sharp sold his 49 percent interest in the hotel in 1976 for $18.5 million, and the hotel was renamed The Sheraton Centre of Toronto.

=== Four Seasons Hotel Toronto ===
The longest-operating Four Seasons property in the city was located on 21 Avenue Road at the intersection with Yorkville Avenue. It consisted of a 31-storey Brutalist concrete tower, with a low-rise podium that stretched south to Cumberland Avenue. It was built in 1972 as the Hyatt Regency Toronto. Issy Sharp bought the hotel in 1978 and renamed it the Four Seasons Hotel Toronto. The hotel was popular with celebrities when the Toronto International Film Festival was centred on the Yorkville area. However Sharp said the building "felt like driving into a garage." The hotel closed on March 28, 2012 and was sold to developer Camrost-Felcorp, which converted it to a condominium development known as Yorkville Plaza. The hotel's facade was renovated, while the podium containing the hotel function rooms, driveway and below-grade retail was demolished and replaced by a new retail complex.

== Composition ==
There is a 839.7-square-metre (9,038 sq ft) penthouse at the top. Finnish businessman Robert Oesterlund and his ex-wife Sarah Pursglove bought the penthouse for $28 million in 2012. The penthouse was designed by Brian Gluckstein.

== See also ==
- List of tallest buildings in Canada
- List of tallest buildings in Toronto
- Peter Clewes
- architectsAlliance
- Trump International Hotel and Tower (Toronto)
- Four Seasons Hotels and Resorts
- Hotels in Toronto
