= Hutton & Souter =

Canadian architectural firm

Hutton & Souter is a Canadian architectural firm established in 1920 by William Russell Souter and Gordon Johnston Hutton. Based in Hamilton, Ontario, the firm is responsible for notable structures in the city and elsewhere, (e.g. McLaughlin Motor Car Showroom and Dominion Public Building). The firm's name was changed to William R. Souter & Associates in 1947 after Hutton's death.

== William Souter ==
Souter was born on 11 June 1894 in Hamilton, Ontario. He studied architecture at the University of Pennsylvania from 1914 to 1917, then partnered with Hutton in 1920. He died on 17 November 1971. Souter had a son, William C. Souter, who was also an architect, inherited his father's firm, and died in 2001.

== Gordon Hutton ==
Hutton was born in 1881 and died, suddenly, in April 1942.

== Completed projects ==
Burlington, Ontario

- Long Vue (residence), built c.1926

Hamilton, Ontario

- 1 St. James Place (house) and sister home, 16 Inglewood; constructed 1936 and designated under the Ontario Heritage Act
- 358 Bay Street South (house), constructed in 1930
- Basilica of Christ the King, built 1931–33
- Cathedral School, constructed in 1928 in Hamilton, Ontario
- Delta Secondary School, the city's oldest high school, opened in 1924
- Hamilton Post Office, originally the Dominion Public Building, completed in 1936

Oshawa, Ontario

- building for General Motors of Canada, constructed c.1927

Toronto, Ontario

- McLaughlin Motor Car Showroom, constructed 1925

Windsor, Ontario

- Chrysler Power Plant, constructed during the period of 1928 to 1935
- Hotel Norton Palmer, built 1930
- Windsor Assembly Plant, constructed for General Motors in 1928
