= Pinnacle Centre =

Condominium tower complex in Toronto, Ontario

Coordinates: 43.642932°N 79.376501°W

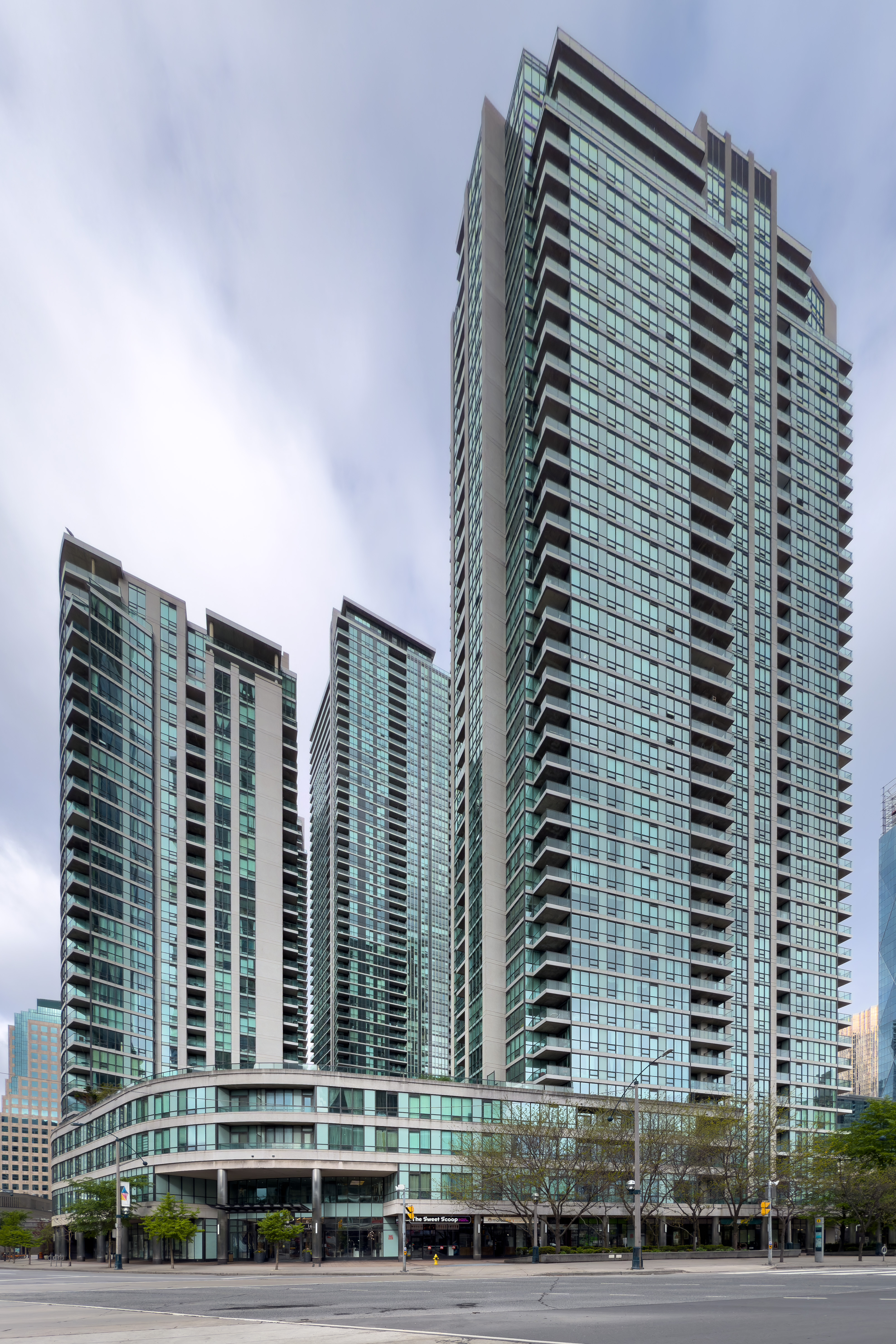
Pinnacle Centre, 2025

Pinnacle Centre is a condominium tower complex in Toronto, Ontario. The complex consists of four towers located on former railway lands on the Toronto waterfront. It is one of a number of new condominium projects in the area, the most notable being nearby Maple Leaf Square and CityPlace developments to the west. The Pinnacle Centre site is bounded by Yonge Street to the east, Harbour Street to the south, Bay Street to the west, and the Gardiner Expressway to the north. It was built by Vancouver−based Pinnacle International. It has 1,880 residences on approximately 3.8 acres of land.

The complex consists of four towers:

- Pinnacle A 16 Yonge St. It was completed in 2006. Floors - 40 Height - 124m (406.82f) Units - 501 Largest Suite - 131.55 m^{2} (1,416f²) Smallest Suite - 47.29 m^{2} (509f²) Completed in 2006.
- Pinnacle B 12 Yonge St. It was completed in 2007. Floors - 29 Height - 92m (301.84f) Units - 298 Largest Suite - 117.62 m^{2} (1,266f²) Smallest Suite - 47.29 m^{2} (509f²) Completed in 2007.
- The Success Tower, Condominium - 41,806.37 m^{2} (450,000f²) Floors - 53 Floors - 5 Height - 157.4m (516.4f)Units - 446 Largest Suite - 104.52 m^{2} (3,575f2)Smallest Suite - 46.45 m^{2} (500f²) Number of Residential Suites - 491. Smallest Residential Suite - 48.5 m^{2} (522f²). Completed in 2009.
- 33 Bay Street, Floors - 51 Floors - 2 Height - 135m (442.91f) Number of Residential Suites - 634 Largest Residential Suite - 117.62 m^{2} (2,909f2) Smallest Residential Suite - 47.29 m^{2} (509f²). Also known as Pinnacle D, began construction in 2008 and was completed in October 2011.
- some suite sizes are inaccurate. m2 / ft2 conversions are wrong.

== See also ==
- List of tallest buildings in Toronto
- List of tallest buildings in Canada
