= McLaughlin Motor Car Showroom =

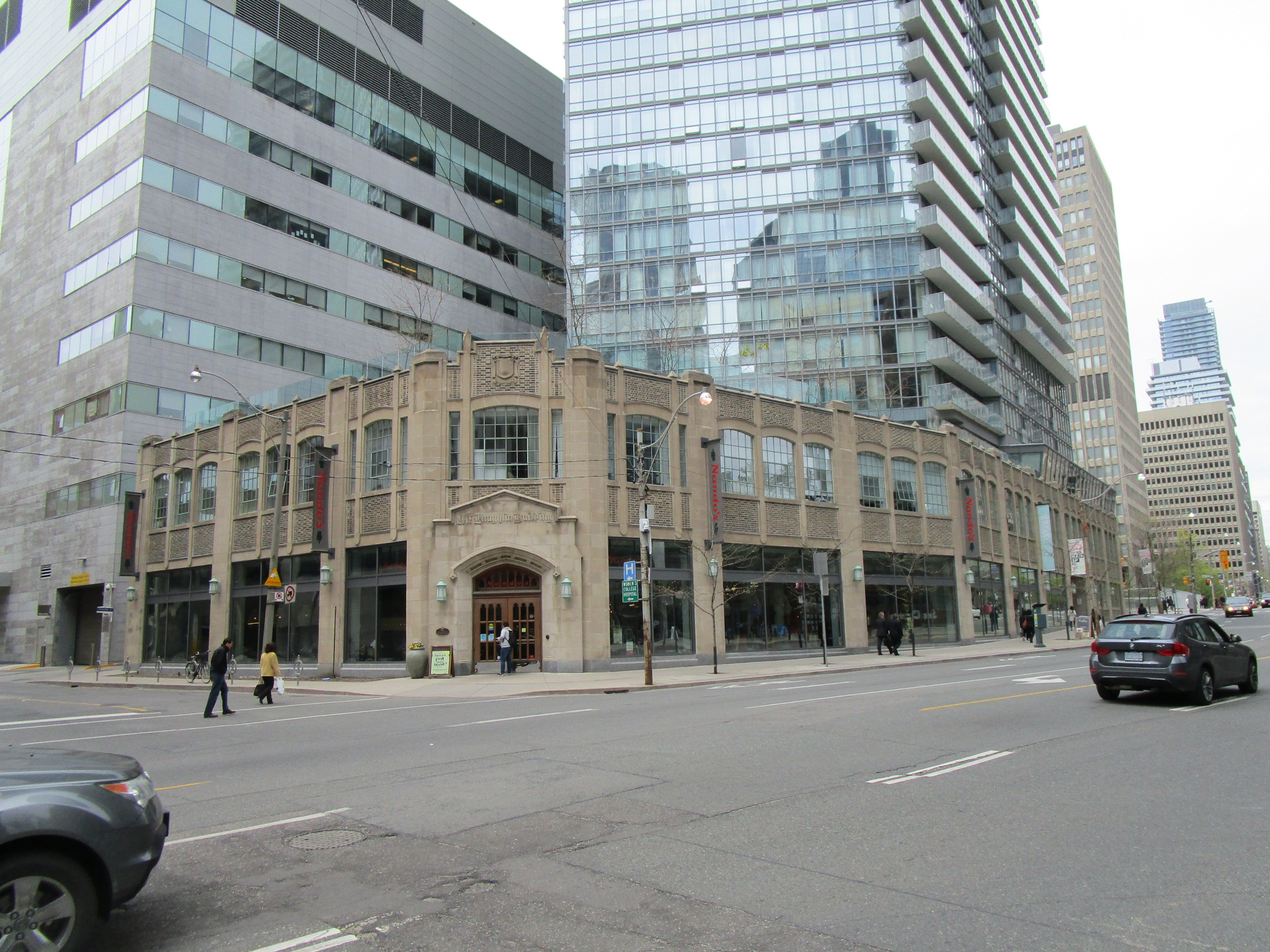
- May 2017

- Location within Toronto

General information
- Status: Reconstructed
- Type: car dealership
- Location: 832 Bay St., Toronto, Ontario
- Coordinates: 43.6616°N 79.3863°W
- Opening: 1925
- Renovated: 2007 (rebuilt into Burano)

Technical details
- Floor count: two

Design and construction
- Architect: Hutton & Souter

The McLaughlin Motor Car Showroom was built in 1925 and operated continuously as a car dealership until March 2007 when it was last occupied by Addison on Bay dealership (Cadillac) at 832 Bay Street, Toronto, Ontario.

== History ==
The R.S. McLaughlin Building, built in the Gothic Revival style, was one of the first automobile dealerships in Toronto. It was constructed by General Motors Corporation of Canada, and was completed in May, 1925, seven years after General Motors had completed a merger with Oshawa's McLaughlin Motor Car Company.

The building remained continuously occupied by car dealerships for eighty-two years. In 1955, it was opened as a Cadillac dealership by Harry Addison, and was known as Addison on Bay. It later became Canada's largest Cadillac dealership, and by the 1980s was operated by former Member of Parliament John Hollings Addison. Despite its long history, the dealership was closed as part of a reorganization and consolidation of the car dealership industry in Canada.

By 1989, it was listed on Toronto's Inventory of Heritage Properties, and designated a Heritage Property by City Council in 1999 under the Ontario Heritage Act (part IV). The latter designation required any property owner to apply to the City of Toronto prior to making changes or demolishing its historic elements. Substantial restoration took place in 1999, including modification for rooftop parking.

In 2000, Ontario Realty Corporation sold the site to Addison Properties Ltd. for what some claim was one-third of its value.

The building was removed to make way for the Burano high-rise condominium, with plans to retain the facade and other historic elements of the original structure and incorporate them into the Burano's lower three floors. Because of the soft soil at the site, and to facilitate excavation, the historic facade was dismantled and stored off-site during construction of the seven-floor underground garage. After the garage and foundation appropriate for the fifty floors above ground were completed, the facade was reconstructed, incorporating the important heritage components.

The historic building is marked with a plaque, placed in 2013 by Heritage Toronto.

== See also ==
- McLaughlin Motor Car Company
- Robert McLaughlin - In 1869 created McLaughlin Carriage Co. in Enniskillen
- Sam McLaughlin - son of Robert McLaughlin; produced the first McLaughlin automobile, leading to the creation of McLaughlin Motor Car Company; negotiated merger with GM; became first President of GM Canada
- General Motors Canada
- General Motors
- Oshawa - Detailed history of the early years of GM in Canada.
