= Residences of College Park =

Skyscraper complex in Toronto, Ontario, Canada

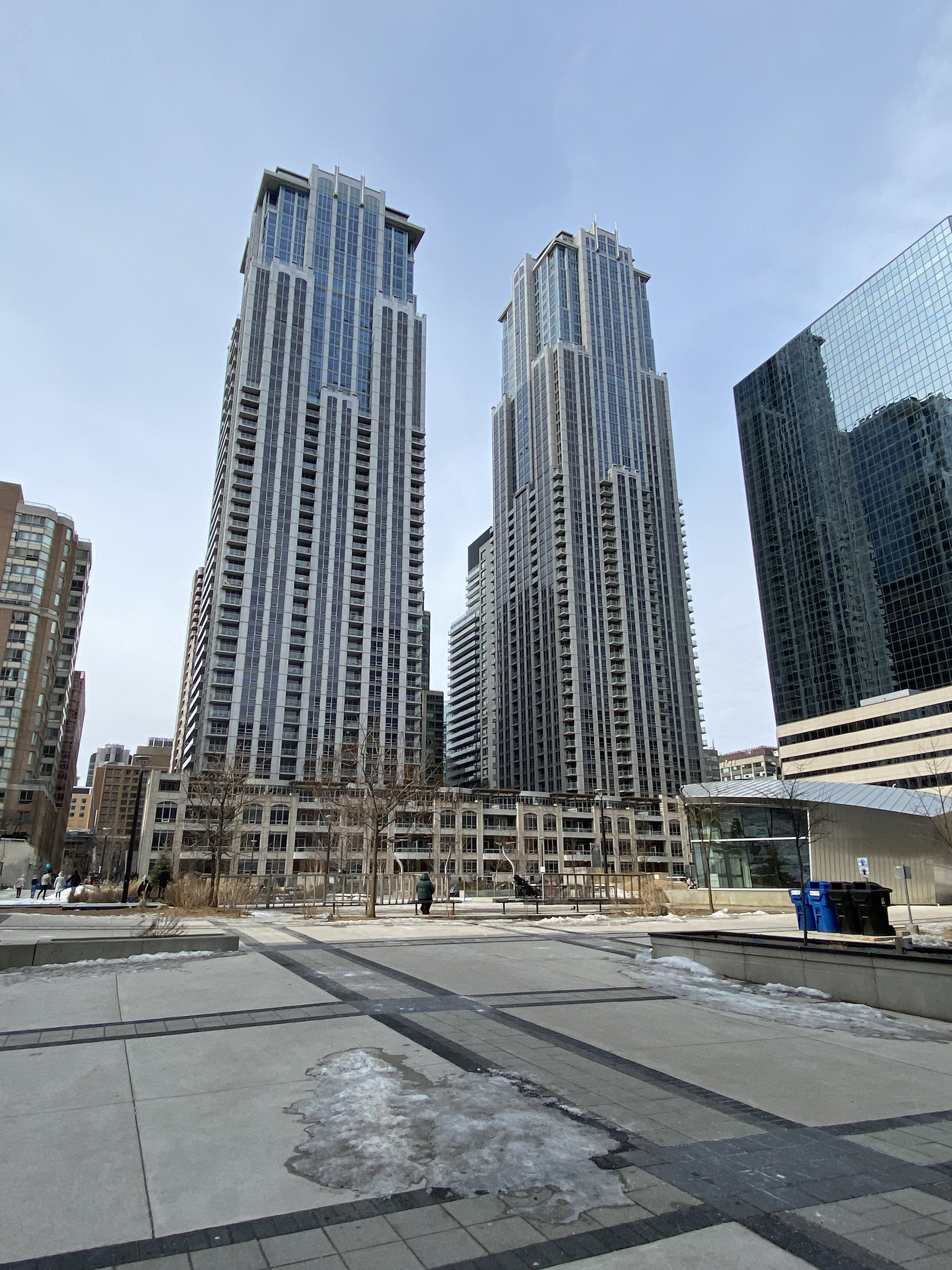
- Interactive map of the Residences of College Park area

General information
- Type: Residential condominiums
- Location: 761 & 763 Bay Street; Toronto, Ontario
- Coordinates: 43.659827°N 79.384874°W
- Construction started: North tower: 2003; South tower: 2005
- Completed: North tower: 2006; South tower: 2008
- Owner: Toronto Standard Condominium Corp

Height
- Roof: North tower: 154.6 m (507 ft); South tower: 139.7 m (458 ft)
- Top floor: North tower: 148.5 m (487 ft); South tower: 133.6 m (438 ft)

Technical details
- Floor count: North tower: 51; South tower: 45
- Floor area: 1,100,000 sq ft (100,000 m^{2})
- Lifts/elevators: North tower: 6 South tower: 6

Design and construction
- Architects: Graziani & Corazza Architects
- Developer: Canderel Stoneridge Equity Group

Residences of College Park is a skyscraper complex in Toronto, Ontario, Canada. The north and south towers were completed in 2006 and 2008, respectively, and stand 155 and 140 m (509 and 459 ft) on Bay Street just south of College Street near the historic College Park department store. A third phase of the development, known as Aura opened in 2014, and is the tallest residential building in Canada.

== See also ==
- List of tallest buildings in Toronto
- List of tallest buildings in Canada
