= Peter Clewes =

Canadian architect

- Born: Montreal
- Education: University of Waterloo
- Occupation: Architect
- Practice: architectsAlliance
- Buildings: SP!RE, Casa Condominio Residenza, Murano, Burano, X Condominium, 20 Niagara, MoZo and The Indigo.

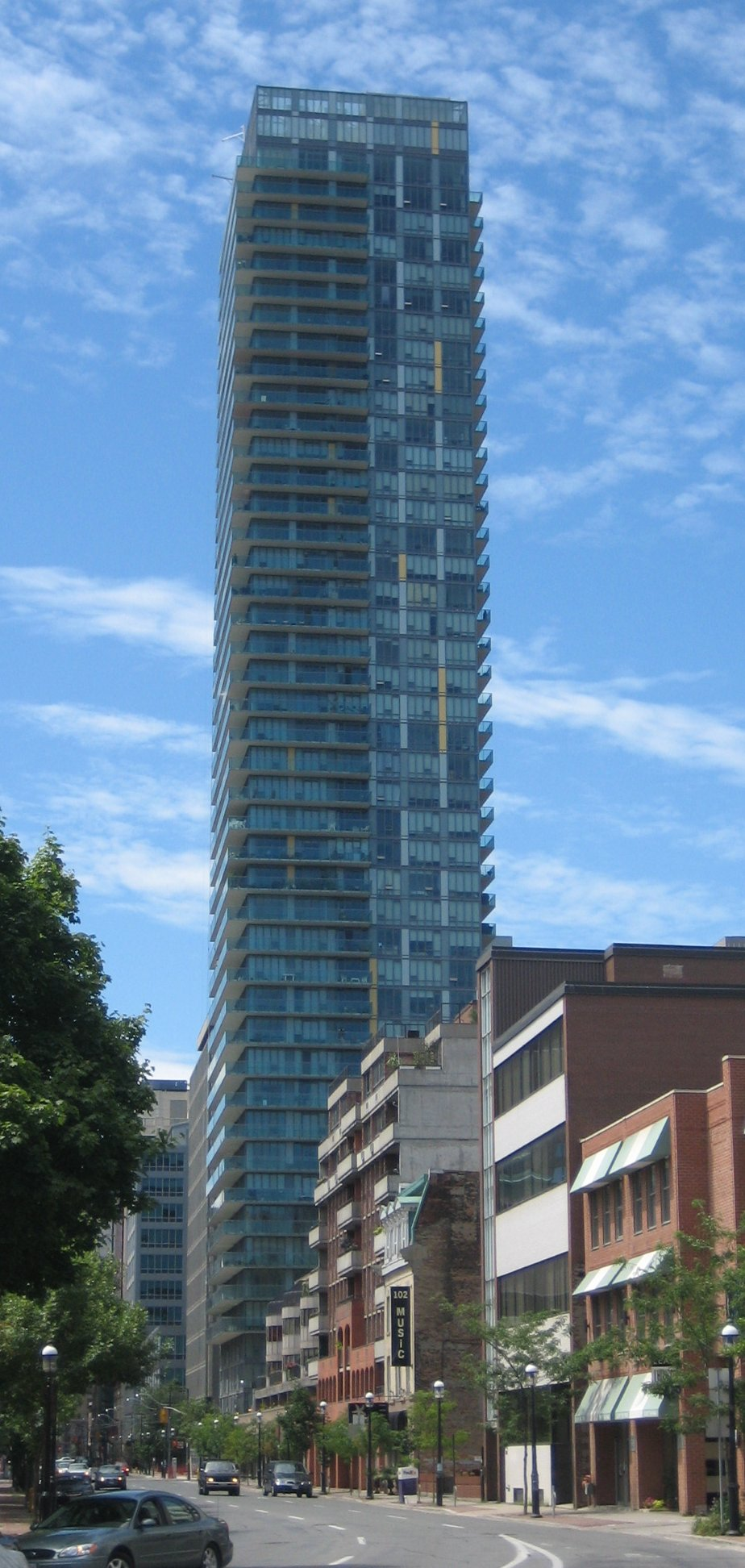
SP!RE is one of the most prominent of Clewes' designs

Peter Clewes is a Canadian architect and the principal of the Toronto-based firm architectsAlliance. He has been one of the leading architects in the condo boom that has reshaped Toronto in the first decade of the 21st century. His projects include SP!RE, Casa Condominio Residenza, Murano, Burano, X Condominium, 20 Niagara, Ideal Lofts, and MoZo. He most often works for Howard Cohen of Context Developments.

== Biography ==
Clewes designed buildings can be described as neomodern. He is notable for creating unadorned towers with large expanses of glass and developer-friendly, affordable use of materials. He is a critic of neo-historical and postmodern structures, arguing there is no reason to force tiny windows and aged styles when modern technology can create expansive floor to ceiling windows. He has argued forcefully against contextualism, and has not employed it for projects such as his Distillery District designs. He told The Globe and Mail "We need to create buildings of our time. Architecture is a record of where a city and a culture was at a particular time." His designs have been well received by customers and critics. Christopher Hume is one of his strongest advocates. Hume, the architecture critic for the Toronto Star, has given rare A ratings to several of Clewes' designs and has called him "the leading condo designer of his generation."

Originally from Montreal, Clewes studied at the University of Waterloo. From university he gained a co-op placement with the renowned Arthur Erickson. He then joined Erickson's firm in Toronto. With Erickson he participated in a number of major projects, including the Canadian Embassy in Washington. In 1986, he left to help form a separate practice, Wallman Clewes Bergman. Wallman Clewes Bergman merged with Van Nostrand DiCastri Architects in 1999 to form architectsAlliance. Clewes has taught at the University of Toronto and is a currently a member of the Toronto Waterfront Design Review Panel.
