= Oxford Tower (Toronto) =

Coordinates: 43.650°N 79.384°W

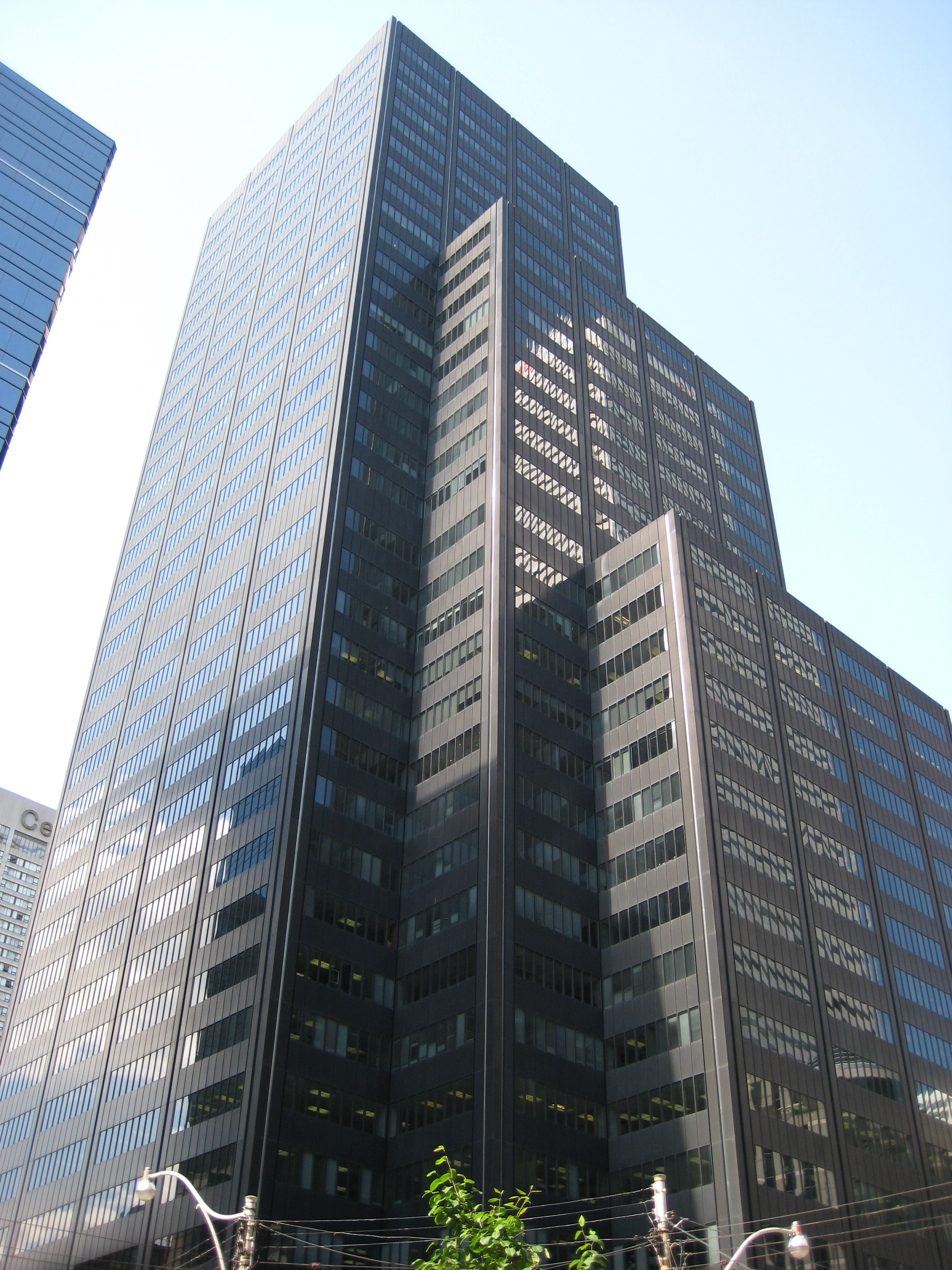
- Interactive map of the Oxford Tower (Toronto) area

General information
- Status: Completed
- Type: Office
- Architectural style: modernism
- Location: 130 Adelaide Street West, Canada
- Construction started: 1977
- Completed: 1979

Height
- Height: 449.48 ft

Technical details
- Floor count: 33 (4 below ground)
- Lifts/elevators: 17

Design and construction
- Architect: WZMH Architects

Oxford Tower is the 39th-tallest structure in Toronto, located at 130 Adelaide Street West. It was completed in 1979. The building is named after its landlord, Oxford Properties and is part of the Richmond-Adelaide Centre. The building is measured at 137 metres above street level. It has 33 above-ground storeys and is attached to Toronto's underground PATH system.
