= SP!RE =

High-rise condominium building in downtown Toronto, Ontario, Canada

Coordinates: 43.651423°N 79.375341°W

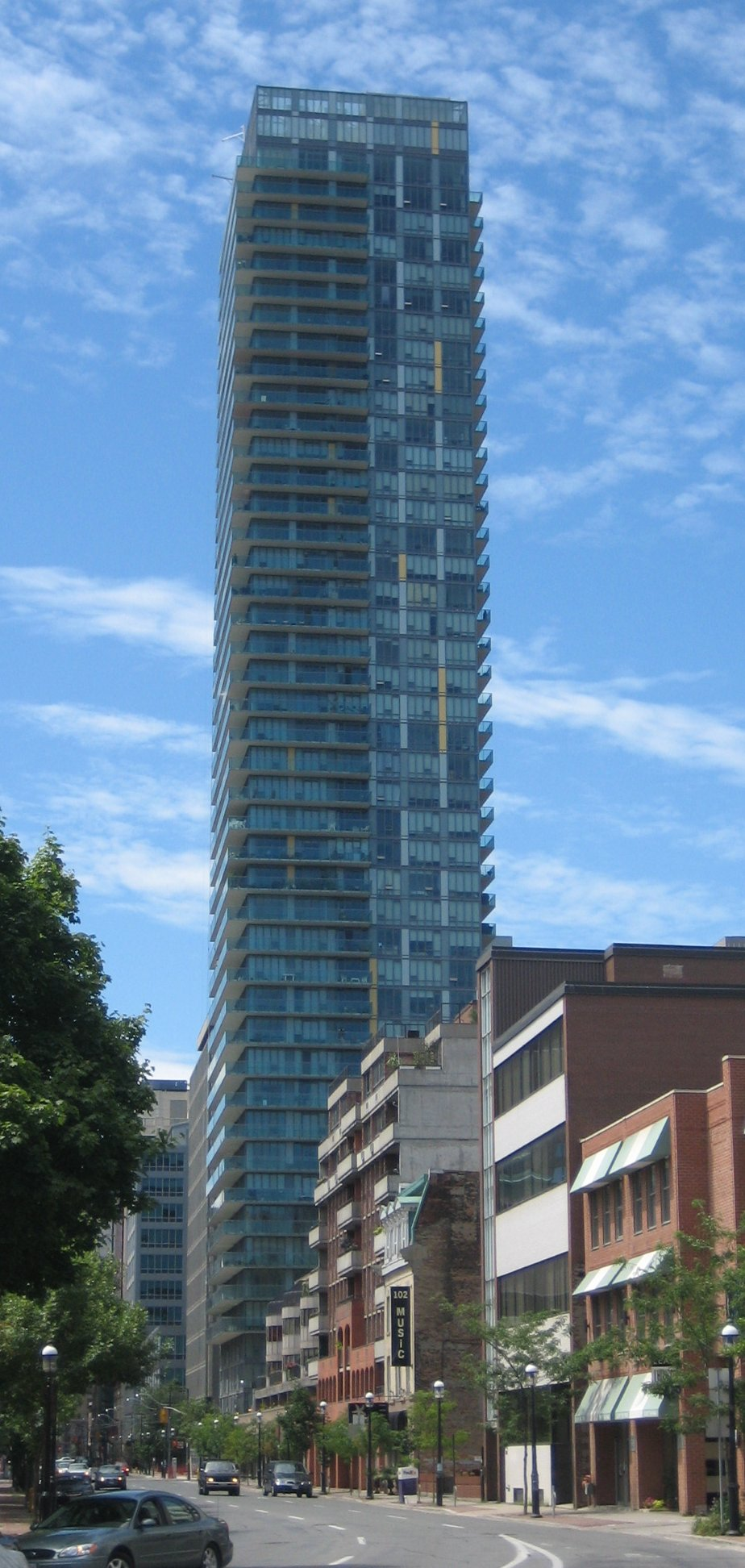
The completed SP!RE

SP!RE is a high-rise condominium building located at 70 Adelaide Street East at Church Street in downtown Toronto, Ontario, Canada by Context Development. Construction was completed in 2007.

The structure was designed by Peter Clewes of architectsAlliance and is 145 metres tall with 322 suites (from 42 m^{2} to 228 m^{2}) in 45 floors.

== Education ==
The tower has been assigned to the following schools in the Toronto District School Board:

- Elementary and Intermediate: Market Lane Public School (Kindergarten through 8th Grade)
- Secondary: Jarvis Collegiate Institute
- Technical: Central Technical School
- Commercial: West Toronto Collegiate Institute or Northern Secondary School (Residents may attend either school)

The closest post-secondary institutions are George Brown College, Toronto Metropolitan University, OCAD University and University of Toronto.
