= Casa Condominio Residenza =

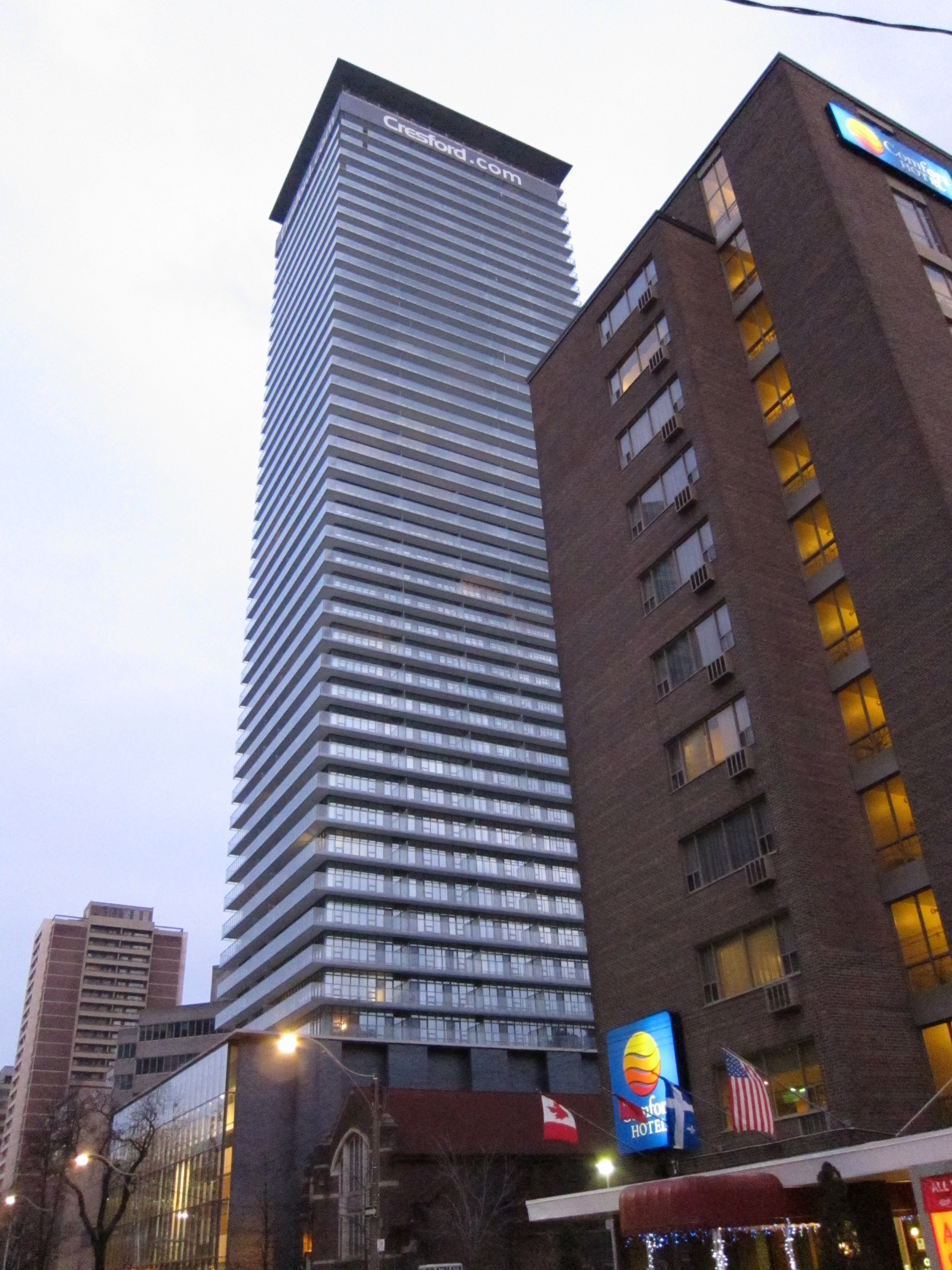
- CASA in January 2010

General information
- Status: Completed
- Type: Residential
- Location: 33 Charles Street East; Toronto, Ontario M4Y 0A2
- Coordinates: 43.668767°N 79.384572°W
- Inaugurated: March 22, 2010

Height
- Antenna spire: 138 m (453 ft)

Technical details
- Floor count: 46 (topped out as of September 2009)

Design and construction
- Architect: architectsAlliance
- Developer: Cresford Developments

Casa Condominio Residenza, or The CASA, is a high-rise condominium building at 33 Charles Street East near the intersection of Bloor Street and Yonge Street in downtown Toronto, Ontario, Canada. It features a New Modernist design by architectsAlliance emphasizing glass curtain wall, with balconies wrapped around the building from the podium to the top. An overhanging concrete slab concludes the design at the roof of the final floor. It is lit from underneath at night. The balconies themselves have transparent glazed balustrades, and the podium's main facade facing Charles Street also makes use of glass curtain wall extensively, framed with black brick.

On January 13, 2006, The Globe and Mail reported that in November, 2005, the Casa was one of the three condos with the greatest units sold—81 units.

Residents took occupancy in October 2008.

On February 15, 2013, Sydnia Yu, The Globe and Mail's real estate correspondent, profiled one of the building's recently sold penthouse suites. The suite sold for $2 million.

On February 26, 2015, Metro News described the building as "one of the first towers to transform the South Bloor East cityscape." A second tower of 56 floors was completed nearby in 2016, and called Casa II. A third tower, Casa III, completed in 2018, was described by Metro News as "a prominent milestone that will be clearly seen from Yonge Street."
