= Bay Street =

Thoroughfare in Toronto, Canada

Coordinates: 43°39′26″N 79°23′03″W

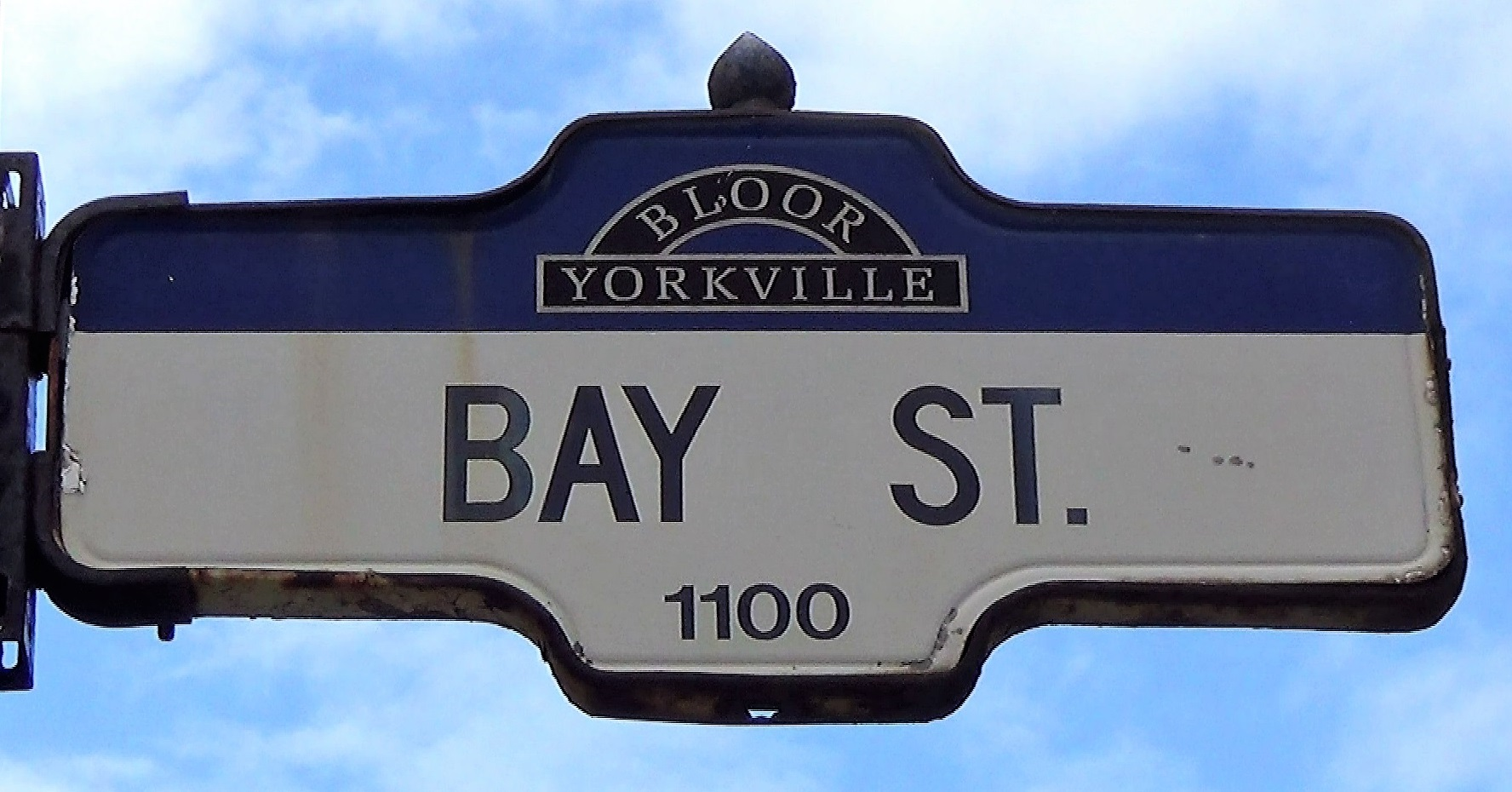

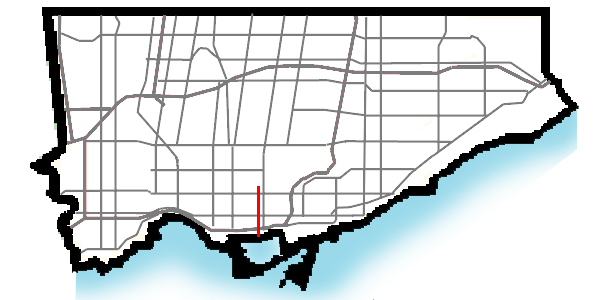
- Interactive map of Bay Street
- North end: Davenport Road
- South end: Lake Ontario

Other
Nearby arterial roads in Toronto
← University Avenue; Avenue Road	Yonge Street →

Bay Street is a major thoroughfare in Downtown Toronto, Ontario, Canada. It is the centre of Toronto's Financial District and is often used by metonymy to refer to Canada's financial services industry since succeeding Montreal's St. James Street in that role in the 1970s.

Bay Street begins at Queens Quay (Toronto Harbour) in the south and ends at Davenport Road in the north. The original section of Bay Street ran only as far north as Queen Street West and just south of Front Street where the Grand Trunk rail lines entered into Union Station. Sections north of Queen Street were renamed Bay Street as several other streets were consolidated and several gaps filled in to create a new thoroughfare in the 1920s. The largest of these streets, Terauley Street, ran from Queen Street West to College Street. At these two points, there is a curve in Bay Street. North of College past Grenville Street to Breadalbane Street was St. Vincent Street, which was later bypassed with new alignment to the west leading to a stub now called St. Vincent Lane from Grosvenor Street to Grenville Street.

== History ==
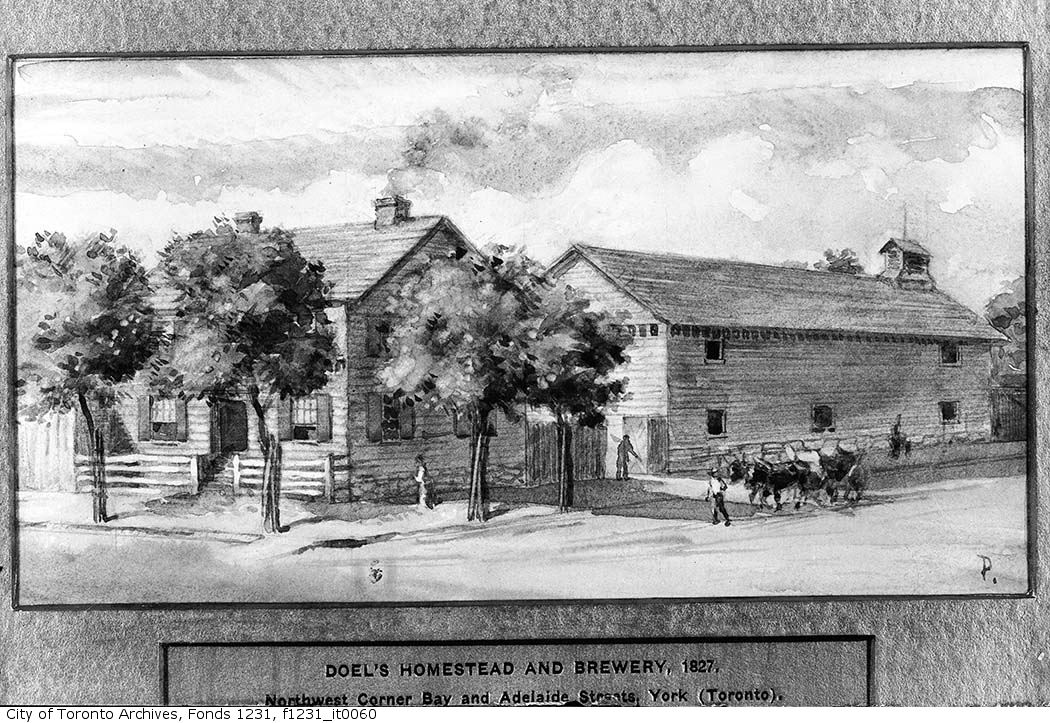
Doel's Homestead and Brewery on the northwest corner of Bay and Adelaide Street, 1827

The street was originally known as Bear Street because of frequent bear sightings in the early history of Toronto. It was renamed Bay Street in 1797 from the fact that it connected Lot Street (present-day Queen Street West) to a bay at the Toronto Harbour. In the 19th century, the intersection of Bay and King Street was home to Toronto's major newspapers: the Mail Building, the old Toronto Star Building, and the William H. Wright Building (old Globe and Mail headquarters) were all located near the intersection.

Until 1922, the section of Bay running north from Queen Street and ending at College Street was known as Terauley Street (named after the Terauley estate of John Simcoe Macaulay near Bay and Queen Streets). Several discontinuous streets existed north of College Street to Davenport Road - St. Vincent Street, Chapel Street, North Street, Ketchum Avenue. By-Law 9316 joined these streets together as far north as Scollard Street in 1922. Finally, By-Law 9884, enacted on January 28, 1924, changed the name of Ketchum Avenue to Bay Street, extending it to Davenport Road. There is a short street called Terauley Lane running west of Bay from Grenville Street to Grosvenor Street.

== Finance district ==
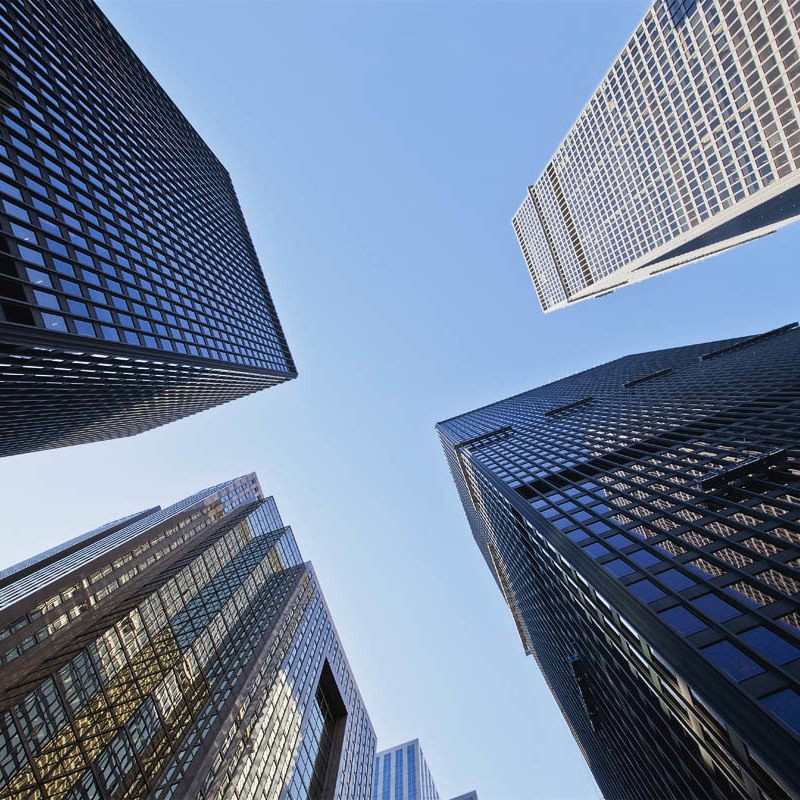
Office towers for BMO, Scotiabank, CIBC and TD Bank from the intersection of Bay and King Street

"Bay Street" is frequently used as a metonym to refer to Toronto's Financial District and the Canadian financial sector as a whole, similar to Wall Street in the United States. "Bay Street banker", as in the phrase "cold as a Bay Street banker's heart", was a term of opprobrium especially among Prairie farmers who feared that Toronto-based financial interests were hurting them. Within the legal profession, the term Bay Street is also used colloquially to refer to the large, full-service business law firms of Toronto.

The intersection of Bay and King Street is often seen as the centre of Canadian banking and finance. Four of Canada's five major banks have office towers at the intersection — the Bank of Montreal at First Canadian Place, Scotiabank at Scotia Plaza, the Canadian Imperial Bank of Commerce (CIBC) at Commerce Court, and Toronto-Dominion Bank at the Toronto-Dominion Centre — and the fifth, the Royal Bank at Royal Bank Plaza, is one block south. Historically, Bay and King was known as the "MINT Corner" from Montreal, Imperial, Nova Scotia, and Toronto, but since 1961 the Imperial Bank has been part of CIBC and the Bank of Nova Scotia has rebranded itself, so this nickname is no longer widely used. The core cluster of towers has crept north with the addition of the 50-storey Bay Adelaide Centre and the St. Regis Hotel.

== Points of interest ==
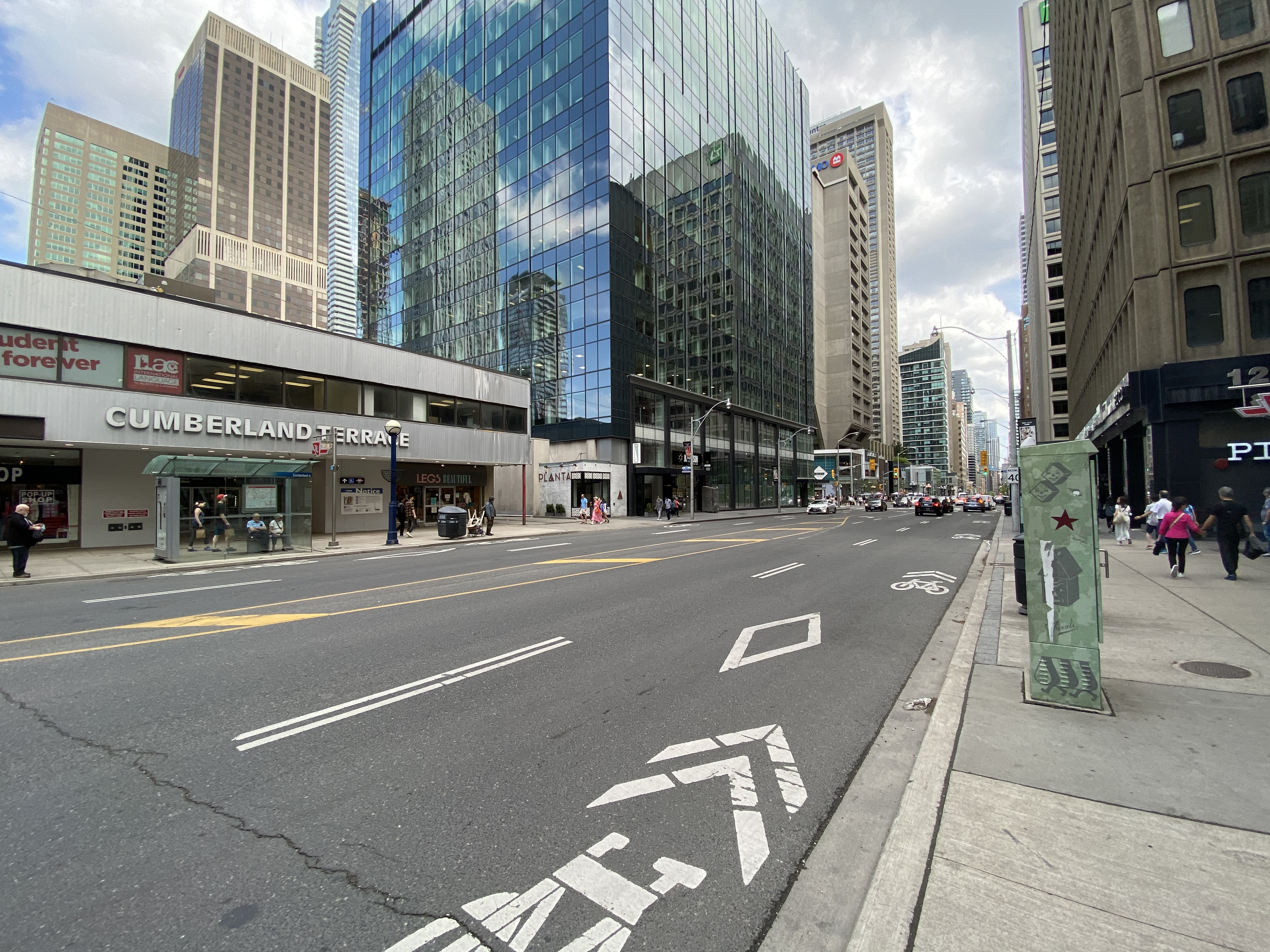
Bay Street near Cumberland Terrace

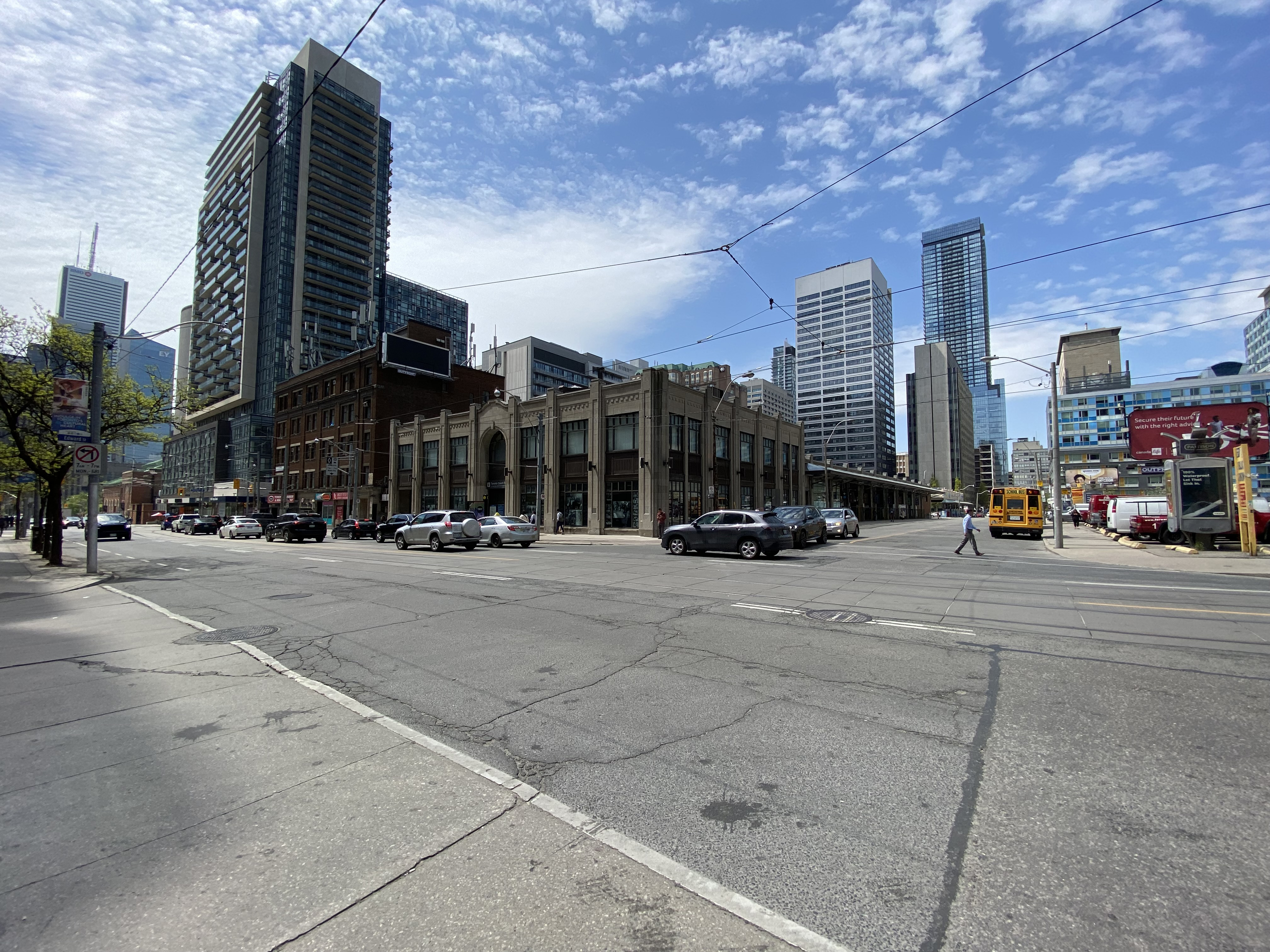
Bay Street at Edward Street

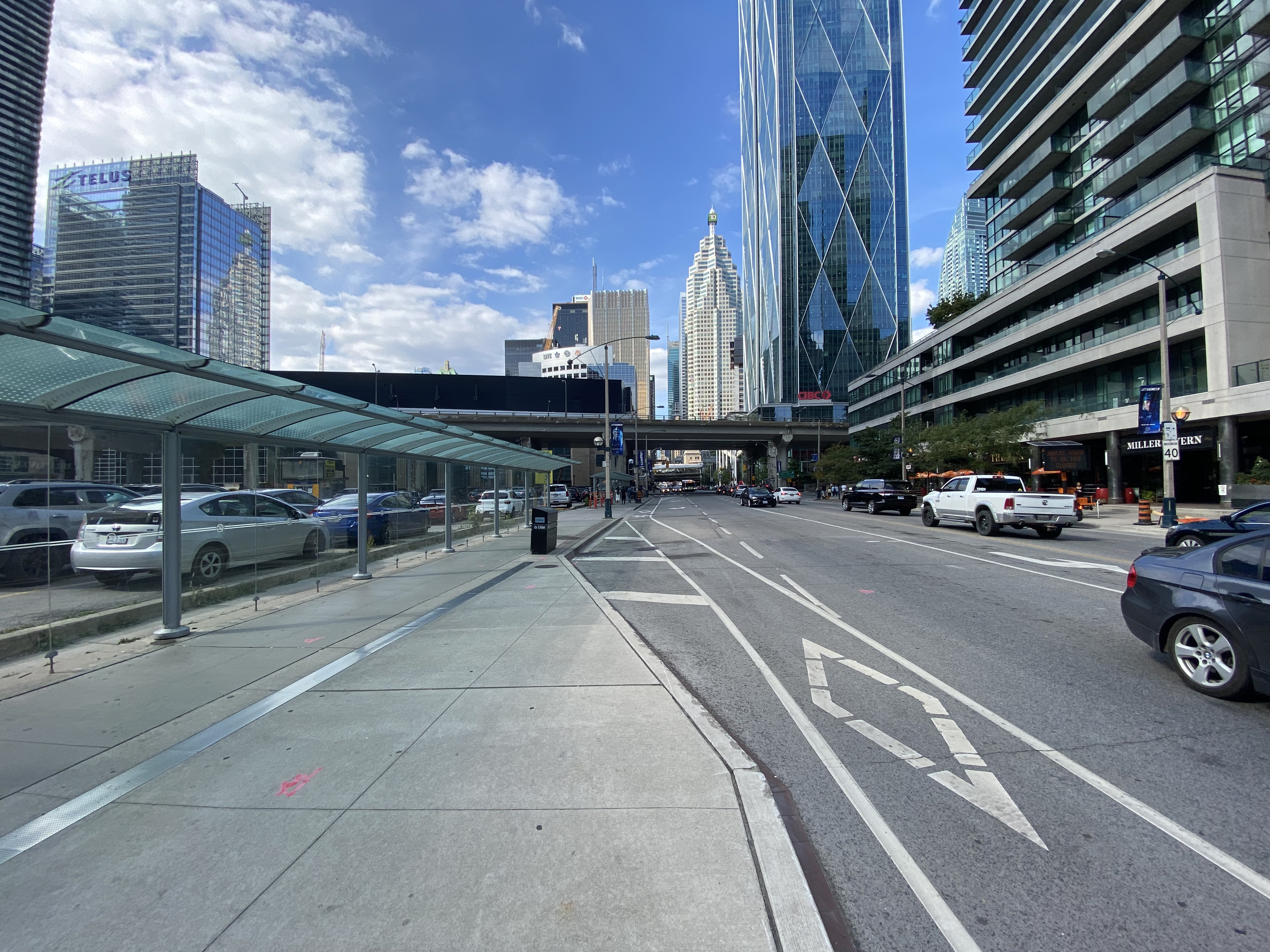
Bay Street near Harbour Street

The Union Station rail, subway, and bus hub partly fronts on Bay at Front, toward the south end of the central business district. The intersection of Bay and Bloor is the location of the Toronto Transit Commission's Bay subway station, toward the north end of the central business district. From its 1931 opening until its 2021 decommissioning, intercity bus service was also provided at the Toronto Coach Terminal on Bay slightly north of Dundas.

Significant condominium development on Bay, north of the financial district, boomed during the 1990s and construction continues on large, 40-plus storey condominiums and multi-use buildings today. The area is defined by Dundas Street to the south and Bloor/Yorkville to the north and crosses through Toronto's Discovery District. Another prominent intersection is the one nearest Yorkville at Bay and Bloor, the centre of an expensive shopping district known as Mink Mile.

The area attracts many who work in the financial district and those who work in the Discovery District, nearby hospitals and schools (Toronto Metropolitan University and the University of Toronto). More than 67 per cent (or 10,380) of residents in this area are in the working ages of 25–64, significantly higher than the City of Toronto's average of 58%.

Notable buildings include:

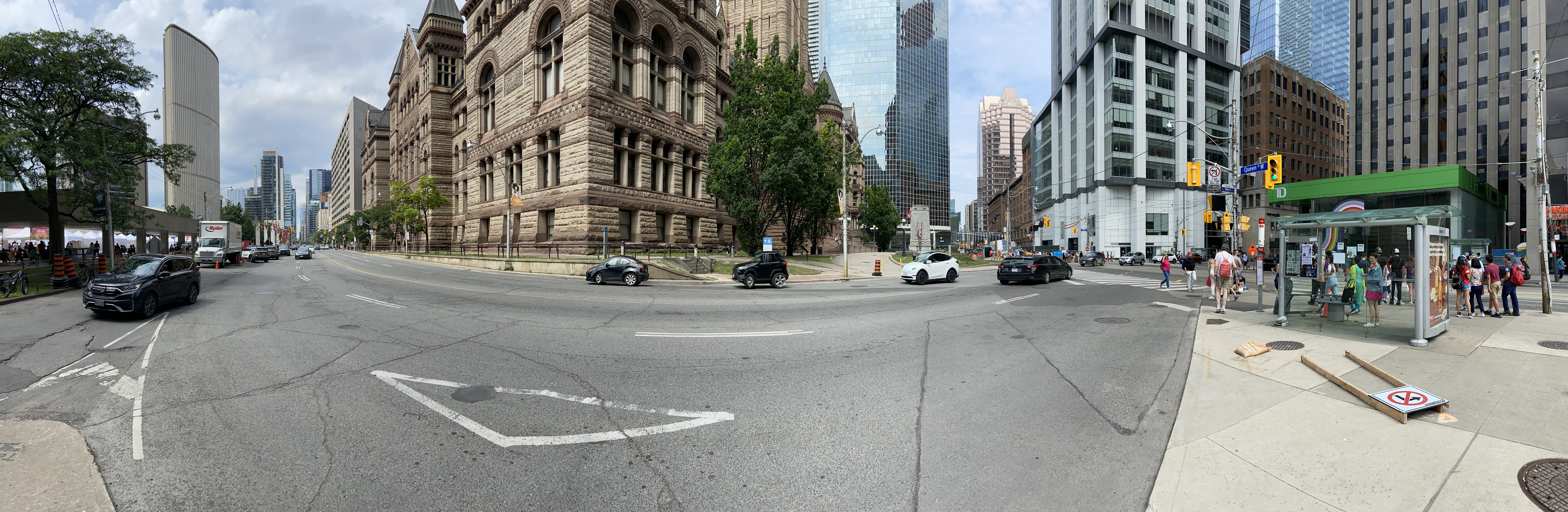
Toronto City Hall and Old City Hall, with Bay Street bisecting the two buildings

- St. Basil's Church (Toronto)
- Toronto Coach Terminal
- Residences of College Park
- 777 Bay
- Murano
- Ontario Government Buildings
- Sutton Place Hotel
- Manulife Centre
- Bell Trinity Square
- Toronto Old City Hall
- Nathan Phillips Square
- Flagship store of Hudson's Bay Company
- Bay-Adelaide Centre
- The St. Regis Toronto
- Commerce Court
- Brookfield Place
- CIBC Square
- Scotiabank Arena
- RBC WaterPark Place

== Public transit ==
Bay Street is served by the route 19 Bay, which is one of few bus routes exclusively serving Downtown Toronto. Bay Street used to be served by streetcars lines, which were gradually phased out after the north–south Yonge and University subway lines opened in 1954 and 1963 respectively. The remaining streetcar tracks between Dundas and College Streets are now used for short turns and diversions. Trolley buses on route 6 of the TTC trolley bus system served Bay Street from 1976 to 1993.

== See also ==
- List of financial districts
- List of north–south roads in Toronto
