= ArchitectsAlliance =

Toronto-based architectural firm

architectsAlliance
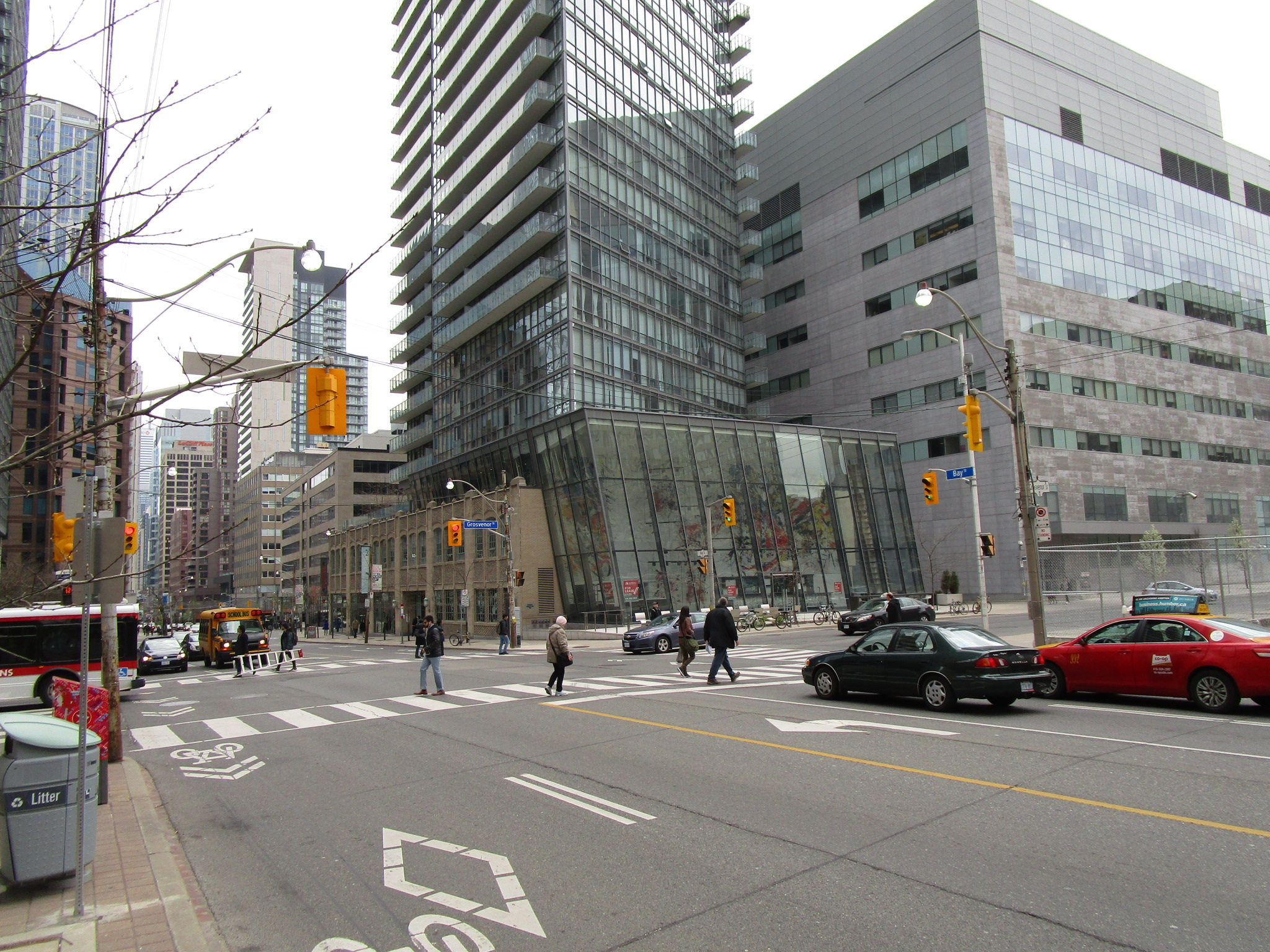
- View of the firm's Burano building in 2017

Practice information
- Key architects: Peter Clewes
- Founded: 1999
- Location: Toronto, Ontario, Canada

Website
- architectsalliance.com

architectsAlliance is a Toronto-based architectural firm headed by architect Peter Clewes. It was formed in 1999 with the merger of Wallman Clewes Bergman (composed of Rudy Wallman, Peter Clewes and Ralph Bergman) and Van Nostrand DiCastri Architects.

== Projects ==
The firm's projects in Toronto have included 18 Yorkville, Pier 27, Radio City, Murano, Burano, X the Condominium, MoZo, Twenty Niagara, District Lofts, and Tip Top Lofts. The Four Seasons Hotel and Residences in Toronto and a project in the Bahamas named 12 Mile Cay are also significant projects.

In 2005, the firm won the Regent Park housing competition held by the Toronto Community Housing Corporation in the redevelopment of a 69-acre (280,000 m^{2}) social housing community east of downtown Toronto.
