= 1964 Toronto municipal election =

1964 Toronto mayoral election
- December 7, 1964
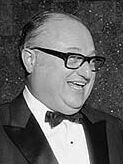

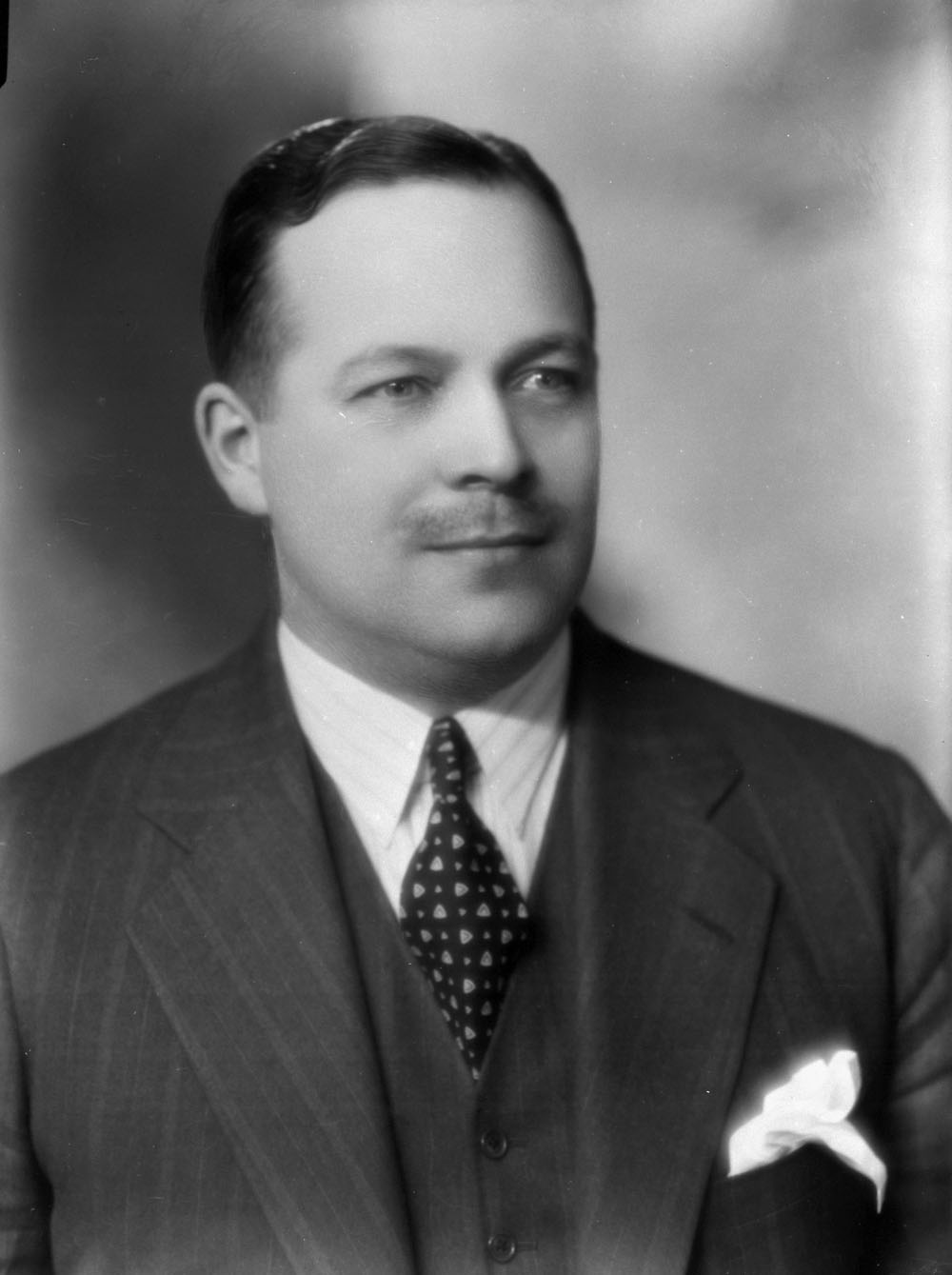
Candidate	Philip Givens	Allan Lamport
Popular vote	62,628	52,143
Percentage	52%	43%
Mayor of Toronto before election
Philip Givens
Elected Mayor of Toronto
Philip Givens

Municipal elections were held in Toronto, Ontario, Canada, on December 7, 1964. Incumbent mayor Philip Givens defeated former mayor Allan Lamport.

== Toronto mayoral race ==
Philip Givens had become mayor in late 1963 after the unexpected death of Donald Dean Summerville. He had previously served many years on city council. He was opposed by Allan A. Lamport, a veteran politician who had served as mayor a decade earlier from 1952 to 1954. Both candidates were affiliated with the Liberal Party, but Lamport ran on a more conservative platform.

Results
Philip Givens - 62,628
Allan Lamport - 52,143
Ross Dowson - 3,026
Charles Mahoney - 1,903

== Board of Control ==
The Toronto Board of Control had one vacancy due to Lamport's decision to run for mayor. Former alderwoman Margaret Campbell bested aldermen George Ben and Richard Horkins to win the position. The Board election was citywide with the top four elected. The two controllers with the most votes also sit on Metropolitan Toronto Council.

Results
William Dennison (incumbent) - 68,892
Herbert Orliffe (incumbent) - 66,280
William Archer (incumbent) - 65,593
Margaret Campbell - 60,900
George Ben - 59,751
Richard Horkins - 47,906
Harry Bradley - 12,949
Phyllis Clarke - 10,284
Fred Graham - 9,673
Patricia Mitchell - 6,750

== City council ==
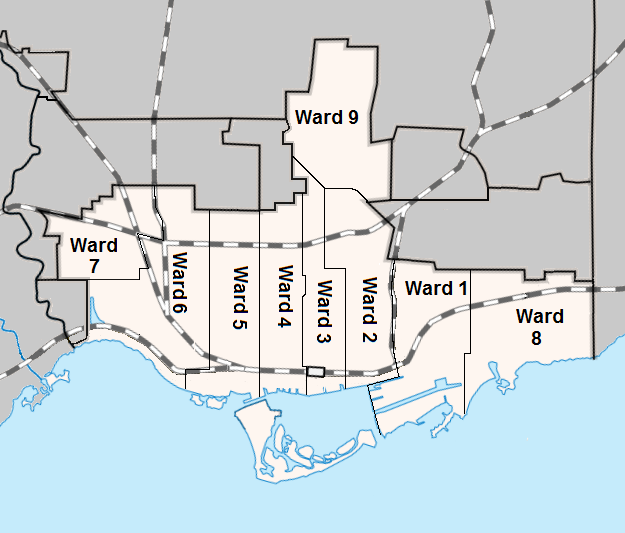
Ward boundaries used in the 1964 election

Two City Council incumbents were defeated. In the Beaches Alice Summerville, widow of Mayor Summerville, reclaimed her husband's former seat and defeated incumbent Alex Hodgins. In the west end William Davidson, who had first been elected to council in 1926, was defeated in a surprise upset by Ben Grys. Two candidates were elected from each ward, with the top vote-getter also winning a seat on Metro Toronto council. Due to the acclamation in Ward 1 Council chose Fred Beavis as that Ward's Metro representative.

Ward 1 (Riverdale)
Fred Beavis (incumbent) - acclaimed
Oscar Sigsworth (incumbent) - acclaimed

Ward 2 (East Regent Park and Rosedale)
Michael Grayson (incumbent) - 4,381
June Marks - 4,268
May Birchard (incumbent) - 3,717
Thomas O'Neil - 3,104
John Sault - 2,610
Donald Weir - 1,902
Stanley Price - 1,350
John Currey - 691

Ward 3 (West Downtown and Summerhill)
Charles Caccia - 4,930
Helen Johnston (incumbent) - 3,194
Harold Fishleigh - 2,528
John MacVicar - 2,259
Jack Frankel - 1,975
John Knox - 1,741
Peter Ward - 356
James Sanderson - 192

Ward 4 (The Annex, Kensington Market and Garment District)
David Rotenberg (incumbent) - 7,795
Horace Brown (incumbent) - 6,439
Samuel Kwinter - 1,717
Dorothy Cureatz - 1,417

Ward 5 (Trinity-Bellwoods and Little Italy)
Joseph Piccininni (incumbent) - 8,091
Harold Menzies - 4,750
William Boytchuk - 3,949
John Jones - 1,234
Charles Weir - 1,216
Edward Cox - 1,096
James Westhead - 869

Ward 6 (Davenport and Parkdale)
Hugh Bruce - 6,836
Ken Dear - 4,984
Tony O'Donohue - 4,853
Archie Chisholm - 4,636
Robert Grossi - 3,039
Elio Madona - 3,016
Pauline Miles - 2,365
Michael Comar - 2,248
Sam Fuda - 2,114
Anne Fritz - 1,675
Hugh Foley - 1,410
Steven Mitchell - 605
Michael Vicko - 499

Ward 7 (Bloor West Village)
Mary Temple (incumbent) - 13,512
Ben Grys - 10,241
William Davidson (incumbent) - 4,778
Charles Edwards - 914

Ward 8 (The Beaches)
Tom Wardle Sr. (incumbent) - 11,449
Alice Summerville - 10,871
Alex Hodgins (incumbent) - 10,418
Edward Gillien - 823
John Square - 556

Ward 9 (North Toronto)
Paul Pickett - 12,372
Kenneth Ostrander (incumbent) - 8,774
David Crombie - 8,371
Kenneth David - 6,378
Willem Meyer - 4,335
Jules Pelletier - 3,532

Results are taken from the December 8, 1964 Toronto Star and might not exactly match final tallies.

== Suburbs ==
=== East York ===
Reeve
(incumbent)True Davidson 9,374
Leslie Saunders 5,332

(source: Globe and Mail, page 9, December 9, 1964)

Davidson defeated former Toronto mayor Saunders to be re-elected reeve.

=== Etobicoke ===
Reeve
(incumbent)John Palmer MacBeth (acclaimed)

Board of Control (2 elected)
(incumbent)Murray Johnson 17,247
(incumbent)John Carroll 16,159
Dorothy Hobbs 8,889

(source: Globe and Mail, page 9, December 9, 1964)

=== Forest Hill ===
Reeve
(incumbent)Edwin Pivnick 2,309
Sidney Banks 1,030

(source: Globe and Mail, page 9, December 9, 1964)

=== Leaside ===
Mayor
(incumbent)Beth Nealson 4,126
Lloyd Dickinson 2,982

=== Long Branch ===
Reeve
Thomas Berry 858
(incumbent)Leonard E. Ford 711

(source: Globe and Mail, page 9, December 9, 1964)

=== Mimico ===
Mayor
(incumbent)Hugh Griggs (acclaimed)

(source: Globe and Mail, page 9, December 9, 1964)

=== New Toronto ===
Mayor
(incumbent)Donald Russell (acclaimed)

(source: Globe and Mail, page 9, December 9, 1964)

=== North York ===
Reeve
James Ditson Service 37,942
(incumbent)Norman C. Goodhead 24,337
Gerald Long 1,886
Water Reiter 1,287

James Ditson Service is elected Reeve of North York, upsetting incumbent Norman Goodhead.

Board of Control
G. Gordon Hurlburt 30,976
Irving Paisley 29,118
Frank Watson 25,830
Basil H. Hall 23,554
Paul Hunt 19,558
Gerald Gallagher 16,547
Gordon Mattershead 10,848
Robert Douglas 10,253
John Gamble 6,461
Edward Conlorz 6,356
Malcolm Carinduff 2,754

The 1964 election saw the creation of North York's inaugural Board of Control.

(source: Globe and Mail, page 9, December 9, 1964)

Township Council
Paul Godfrey and Robert Yuill are elected as ward councillors.

=== Scarborough ===
Reeve
(incumbent)Albert Campbell 24,931
George Barker 9,901

(source: Globe and Mail, page 9, December 9, 1964)

=== Swansea ===
Reeve
(incumbent)Lucien Kurata 1,847
Helen Begg 1,198

(source: Globe and Mail, page 9, December 9, 1964)

=== Weston ===
Mayor
C.W. Boddington 1,144
M.L. Cott 810
C.W. Caskey 681

(source: Globe and Mail, page 9, December 9, 1964)

=== York ===
Reeve
(incumbent)Jack Mould 11,467
Chris Tonks 7,984
Charles McMaster 1,268

(source: Globe and Mail, page 9, December 9, 1964)
