= North York =

Former city in Ontario, Canada

- Dissolved city (lower-tier)
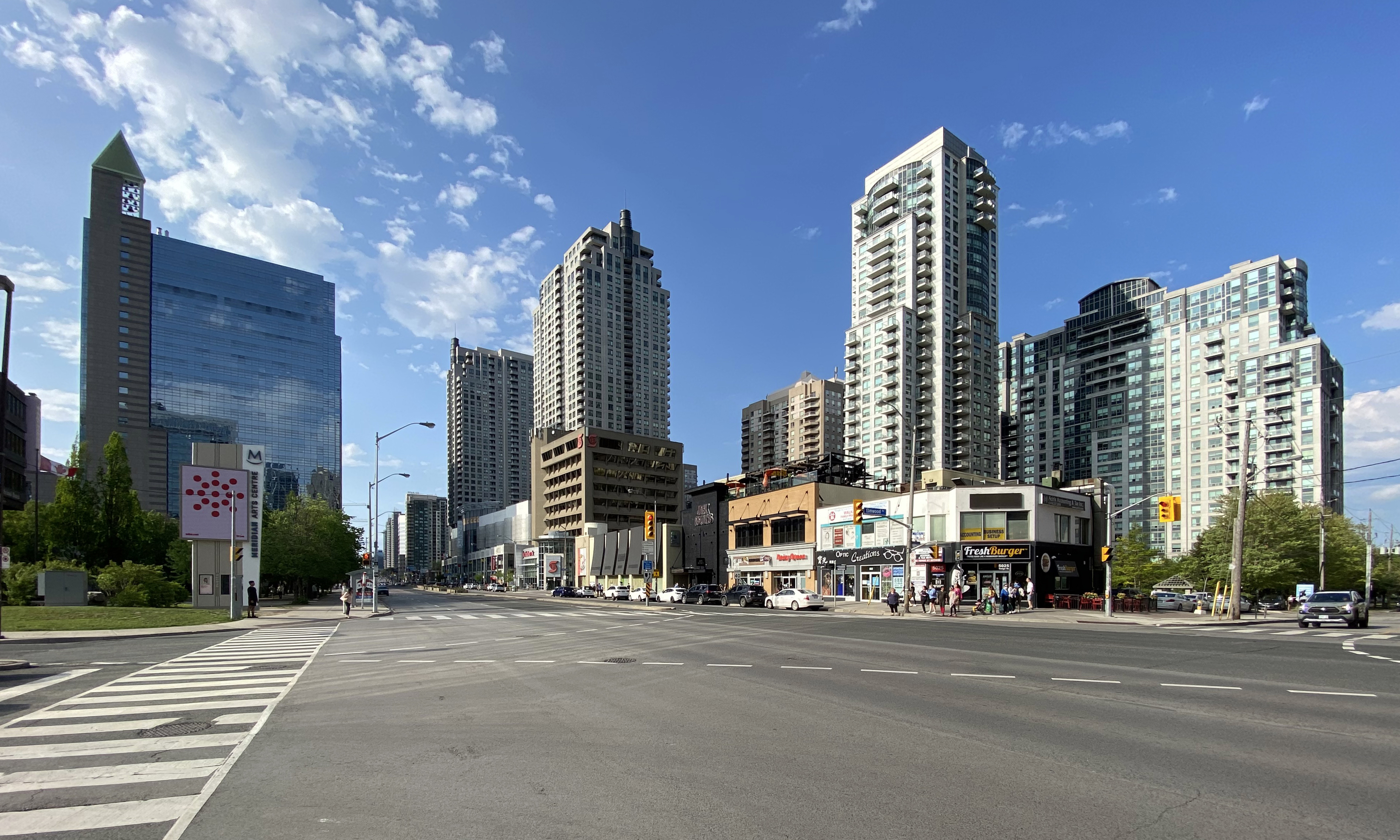
- North York City Centre in 2022

- Flag Seal Top: emblem (1972–1985); Bottom: logo (1985–1998)
- Nickname: The City with Heart
- Motto: Progress With Economy
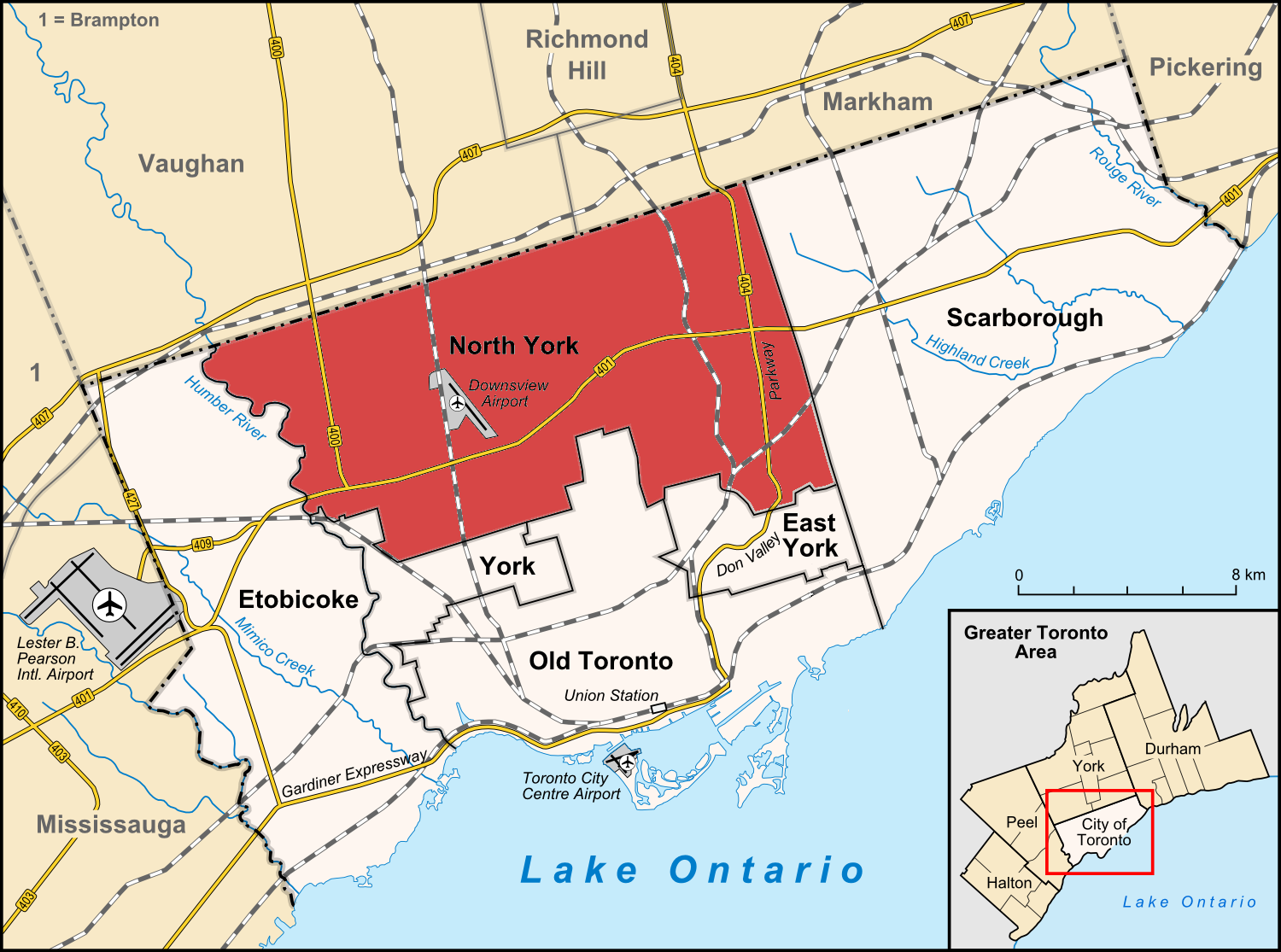
- Location of North York (red) within the rest of Toronto.
- Interactive map of North York
- Coordinates: 43°45′43″N 079°24′37″W
- Country: Canada
- Province: Ontario
- Municipality: Toronto
- Incorporated: June 13, 1922 (Township)
- Changed Region: February 25, 1953 Metropolitan Toronto from York County
- Amalgamated: January 1, 1998 into Toronto

Government
  - Councillors: Shelley Carroll; Mike Colle; Lily Cheng; Jon Burnside; Frances Nunziata; James Pasternak; Anthony Perruzza; Rachel Chernos Lin
  - MPs: Maggie Chi (L); Ali Ehsassi (L); Ahmed Hussen (L); Vince Gasparro (L); Rob Oliphant (L); Salma Zahid (L); Roman Baber (C); Judy Sgro (L)
  - MPPs: Michael Kerzner (PC); Stan Cho (PC); Adil Shamji (OLP); Mohamed Firin (PC); Jonathan Tsao (OLP); Michelle Cooper (PC); Tom Rakocevic (ONDP); Stephanie Bowman (OLP)

Area
  - Total: 176.87 km^{2} (68.29 sq mi)

Population (2021)
  - Total: 683,511
  - Density: 3,864.5/km^{2} (10,009/sq mi)
- Area codes: 416, 647, 437, and 942

North York is a former township and city that is now part of Toronto, Ontario, Canada. It is located in the northern area of Toronto, centred around Yonge Street, north of Ontario Highway 401. It is bounded by York Region to the north at Steeles Avenue, (where it borders Vaughan) on the west by the Humber River, on the east by Victoria Park Avenue. Its southern boundary is erratic and corresponds to the northern boundaries of the former municipalities of Toronto: York, Old Toronto and East York. As of the 2016 Census, the district has a population of 644,685.

North York was created as a township in 1922 out of the northern part of the former township of York, a municipality that was located along the western border of Old Toronto. Following its inclusion in Metropolitan Toronto in 1953, it was one of the fastest-growing parts of Greater Toronto due to its proximity to Toronto. It was declared a borough in 1967, and later became a city in 1979, attracting high-density residences, rapid transit, and a number of corporate headquarters in North York City Centre, its planned central business district. In 1998, North York was dissolved as part of the amalgamation which created the new City of Toronto. It has since become a secondary economic hub of the city outside Downtown Toronto.

== History ==
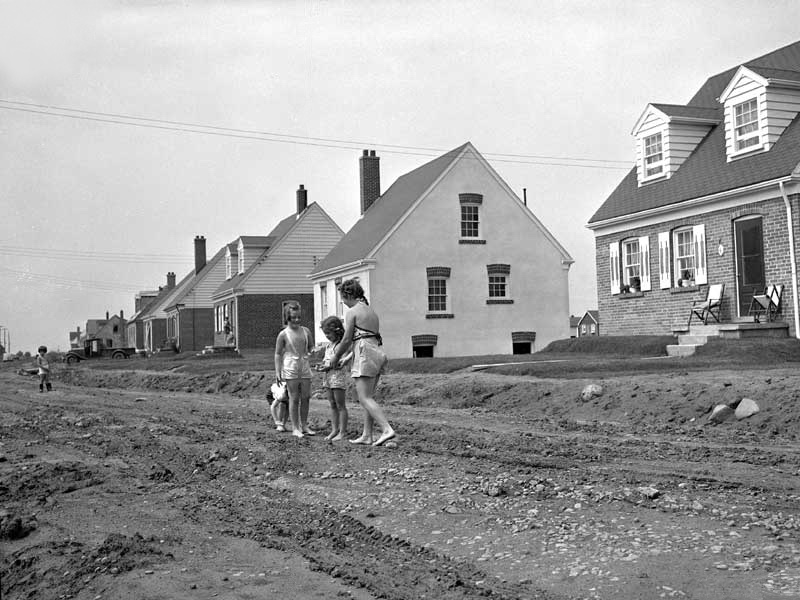
Residences in North York, August 1945. The post-World War II era saw a boom in residential development throughout North York.

The Township of North York was formed on June 13, 1922 out of the rural part of the Township of York. In the previous decade, the southern part of York, bordering the old City of Toronto had become increasingly urbanized while the northern portion remained rural farmland. The northern residents increasingly resented that they made up 20% of York's tax base while receiving few services and little representation in return, particularly after 1920 when their sole member on York's council, which was elected on an at-large basis, was defeated. Dairy farmer Robert Franklin Hicks organized with other farmers to petition the Ontario legislature to carve out what was then the portion of York Township north of Eglinton Avenue to create the separate township of North York. With the support of the pro-farmer United Farmers of Ontario government, a plebiscite was organized and held and the 6,000 residents voted in favour of separating from York by margin of 393 votes.

The township remained largely rural and agrarian until World War II. After the war, in the late 1940s and 1950s, a housing shortage led to the township becoming increasingly developed as a suburb of Toronto and a population boom. In 1953, the province federated 11 townships and villages with the Old City of Toronto, to become Metropolitan Toronto.

North York used to be known as a regional agricultural hub composed of scattered villages. The area boomed following World War II, and by the 1950s and 1960s, it resembled many other sprawling North American suburbs.

As North York became more populous, it became the Borough of North York in 1967, and then on February 14, 1979, the City of North York. To commemorate receiving its city charter on Valentine's Day, the city's corporate slogan was "The City with Heart".

North York was amalgamated into Toronto on January 1, 1998. It now forms the largest part of the area served by the "North York Community Council", a committee of Toronto City Council.

=== Incidents ===
On August 10, 2008, a massive propane explosion occurred at the Sunrise Propane Industrial Gases propane facility just southwest of the Downsview Airport. This destroyed the depot and damaged several homes nearby. About 13,000 residents were evacuated for several days before being allowed back home. One employee at the company was killed in the blast and one firefighter died while attending to the scene of the accident. A follow-up investigation to the incident made several recommendations concerning propane supply depots. It asked for a review of setback distances between depots and nearby residential areas but did not call for restrictions on where they can be located.

Canada's deadliest pedestrian attack occurred in the North York City Centre district on April 23, 2018 when a van collided with numerous pedestrians killing 10 and injuring 16 others on Yonge Street between Finch and Sheppard Avenues.

== Climate ==
Climate data for North York (1991−2020)
Month	Jan	Feb	Mar	Apr	May	Jun	Jul	Aug	Sep	Oct	Nov	Dec	Year
Record high °C (°F)	15.5 (59.9)	15.0 (59.0)	25.5 (77.9)	29.5 (85.1)	34.0 (93.2)	35.5 (95.9)	36.0 (96.8)	37.5 (99.5)	34.5 (94.1)	29.5 (85.1)	23.0 (73.4)	18.0 (64.4)	37.5 (99.5)
Mean daily maximum °C (°F)	−0.9 (30.4)	−0.2 (31.6)	5.1 (41.2)	12.5 (54.5)	19.8 (67.6)	24.8 (76.6)	27.6 (81.7)	26.8 (80.2)	22.9 (73.2)	14.9 (58.8)	8.2 (46.8)	1.8 (35.2)	13.6 (56.5)
Daily mean °C (°F)	−4.8 (23.4)	−4.3 (24.3)	0.4 (32.7)	7.1 (44.8)	13.8 (56.8)	19.0 (66.2)	21.8 (71.2)	21.2 (70.2)	17.4 (63.3)	10.3 (50.5)	4.2 (39.6)	−1.6 (29.1)	8.7 (47.7)
Mean daily minimum °C (°F)	−8.6 (16.5)	−8.4 (16.9)	−4.2 (24.4)	1.7 (35.1)	7.9 (46.2)	13.3 (55.9)	16.1 (61.0)	15.5 (59.9)	11.8 (53.2)	5.7 (42.3)	0.2 (32.4)	−1.6 (29.1)	4.1 (39.4)
Record low °C (°F)	−26.0 (−14.8)	−23.5 (−10.3)	−25.5 (−13.9)	−10.0 (14.0)	−2.5 (27.5)	3.0 (37.4)	7.0 (44.6)	5.5 (41.9)	−0.5 (31.1)	−5.5 (22.1)	−12.5 (9.5)	−26.0 (−14.8)	−26.0 (−14.8)
Average precipitation mm (inches)	72.5 (2.85)	53.3 (2.10)	52.4 (2.06)	74.1 (2.92)	90.3 (3.56)	85.5 (3.37)	80.2 (3.16)	74.0 (2.91)	82.3 (3.24)	66.7 (2.63)	79.4 (3.13)	61.3 (2.41)	871.9 (34.33)
Average rainfall mm (inches)	37.2 (1.46)	31.9 (1.26)	29.2 (1.15)	64.9 (2.56)	90.3 (3.56)	85.5 (3.37)	80.2 (3.16)	74.0 (2.91)	82.3 (3.24)	66.5 (2.62)	69.6 (2.74)	34.6 (1.36)	746.2 (29.38)
Average snowfall cm (inches)	37.8 (14.9)	21.1 (8.3)	23.7 (9.3)	5.5 (2.2)	0.02 (0.01)	0.0 (0.0)	0.0 (0.0)	0.0 (0.0)	0.0 (0.0)	0.2 (0.1)	10.5 (4.1)	26.5 (10.4)	125.2 (49.3)
Average precipitation days (≥ 0.2 mm)	16.7	12.3	12.4	12.7	12.9	11.9	11.6	10.1	11.1	12.8	14.4	13.9	152.7
Average rainy days (≥ 0.2 mm)	6.5	5.5	6.7	11.3	12.9	11.9	11.6	10.1	11.1	12.7	11.0	6.9	118.1
Average snowy days (≥ 0.2 cm)	13.3	8.8	7.2	2.7	0.08	0.0	0.0	0.0	0.0	0.17	4.6	9.2	46.0
Source 1: Meteostat
Source 2: Environment Canada (precipitation/rain/snow 1981–2010)

== Demographics ==
Federal census population history of North York
Year	Pop.	±%
1931	13,210	—
1941	22,908	+73.4%
1951	85,897	+275.0%
1956	170,110	+98.0%
1961	269,959	+58.7%
1966	399,534	+48.0%
1971	504,150	+26.2%
1976	558,398	+10.8%
1981	559,521	+0.2%
1986	556,297	−0.6%
1991	562,564	+1.1%
1996	589,653	+4.8%
2001	608,288	+3.2%
Source: Statistics Canada

=== Ethnicity ===
Largest ethnic origin in North York by census tract based on the 2021 census

The largest ethnicities in North York as per the 2021 census are Chinese (10.7%), Filipino (7.2%), Italian (6.1%), Indian (4.7%), Jewish (3.6%), English (3.6%), Irish (2.9%), Iranian (2.8%), Scottish (2.8%), Korean (2.5%), Russian (2.4%), Vietnamese (2.2%), Jamaican (2%), and Polish (2%).

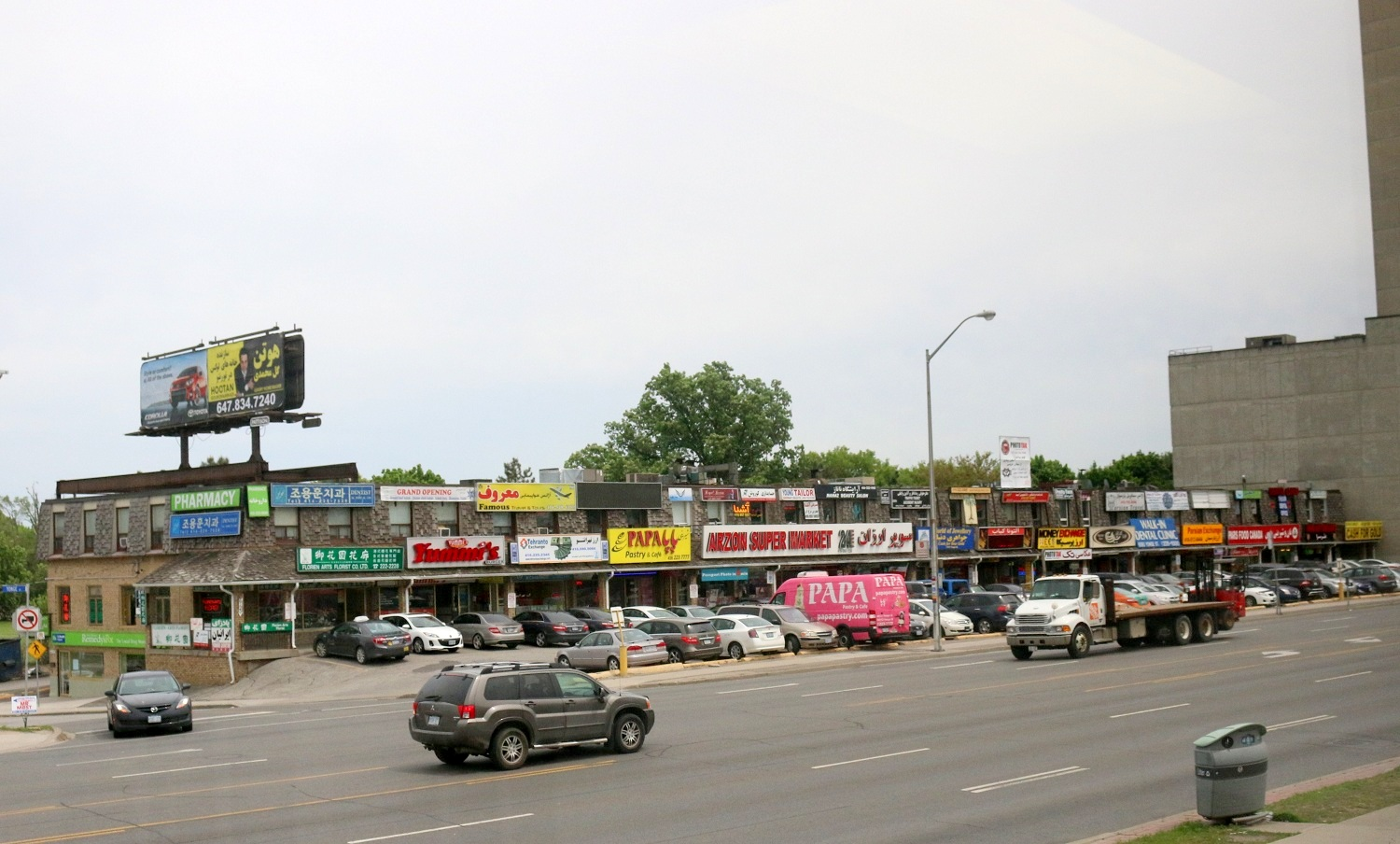
Storefronts in North York offering Persian cuisine. North York holds the largest population of West Asians in Toronto.

Panethnic groups in North York (1996−2021)
Panethnic group	2021 Canadian census (Note: Total of 142 census tracts from 5350260.01 through 5350324.06 in the Toronto CMA, all situated in the former North York census subdivision.)		2016 Canadian census (Note: Total of 136 census tracts from 5350260.01 through 5350324.06 in the Toronto CMA, all situated in the former North York census subdivision.)		2011 Canadian census (Note: Total of 131 census tracts from 5350260.01 through 5350324.06 in the Toronto CMA, all situated in the former North York census subdivision.)		2006 Canadian census (Note: Total of 125 census tracts from 5350260.01 through 5350324.06 in the Toronto CMA, all situated in the former North York census subdivision.)		2001 Canadian census		1996 Canadian census	
Panethnic group	Pop.	%	Pop.	%	Pop.	%	Pop.	%	Pop.	%	Pop.	%
European (Note: Statistic includes all persons that did not make up part of a visible minority or an indigenous identity.)	239,355	35.35%	266,785	40.04%	285,110	44.28%	295,800	47.73%	319,445	52.97%	348,430	59.59%
East Asian (Note: Statistic includes total responses of "Chinese", "Korean", and "Japanese" under visible minority section on census.)	110,555	16.33%	113,215	16.99%	101,590	15.78%	103,195	16.65%	84,975	14.09%	61,080	10.45%
Southeast Asian (Note: Statistic includes total responses of "Filipino" and "Southeast Asian" under visible minority section on census.)	84,180	12.43%	69,680	10.46%	56,400	8.76%	40,040	6.46%	32,685	5.42%	26,030	4.45%
African	69,470	10.26%	63,120	9.47%	61,745	9.59%	53,815	8.68%	52,180	8.65%	48,505	8.3%
South Asian	68,980	10.19%	60,035	9.01%	58,390	9.07%	61,015	9.85%	53,980	8.95%	49,590	8.48%
Middle Eastern (Note: Statistic includes total responses of "West Asian" and "Arab" under visible minority section on census.)	46,760	6.91%	43,860	6.58%	37,460	5.82%	29,400	4.74%	25,280	4.19%	21,470	3.67%
Latin American	29,270	4.32%	26,705	4.01%	24,050	3.74%	22,335	3.6%	19,040	3.16%	16,820	2.88%
Indigenous	2,645	0.39%	2,910	0.44%	2,005	0.31%	1,655	0.27%	1,415	0.23%	1,335	0.23%
Other/multiracial (Note: Statistic includes total responses of "Visible minority, n.i.e." and "Multiple visible minorities" under visible minority section on census.)	25,810	3.81%	20,055	3.01%	17,065	2.65%	12,450	2.01%	14,060	2.33%	11,415	1.95%
Total responses	677,025	99.05%	666,365	99.02%	643,815	98.88%	619,705	99.21%	603,060	99.14%	584,675	99.16%
Total population	683,511	100%	672,955	100%	651,083	100%	624,610	100%	608,288	100%	589,653	100%
Note: Totals greater than 100% due to multiple origin responses.

=== Language ===
Top Ten Mother Tongue Languages
Mother Tongue Languages	Population	Percentage
English	280,320	43.9%
Mandarin	40,125	6.3%
Persian	30,465	4.8%
Tagalog (Pilipino, Filipino)	28,810	4.5%
Cantonese	27,665	4.3%
Russian	20,320	3.2%
Korean	19,265	3.0%
Spanish	16,220	2.5%
Italian	15,440	2.4%
Urdu	10,325	1.6%
Others	123,895	19.4%
Multiple Responses	25,255	4.0%

== Economy ==
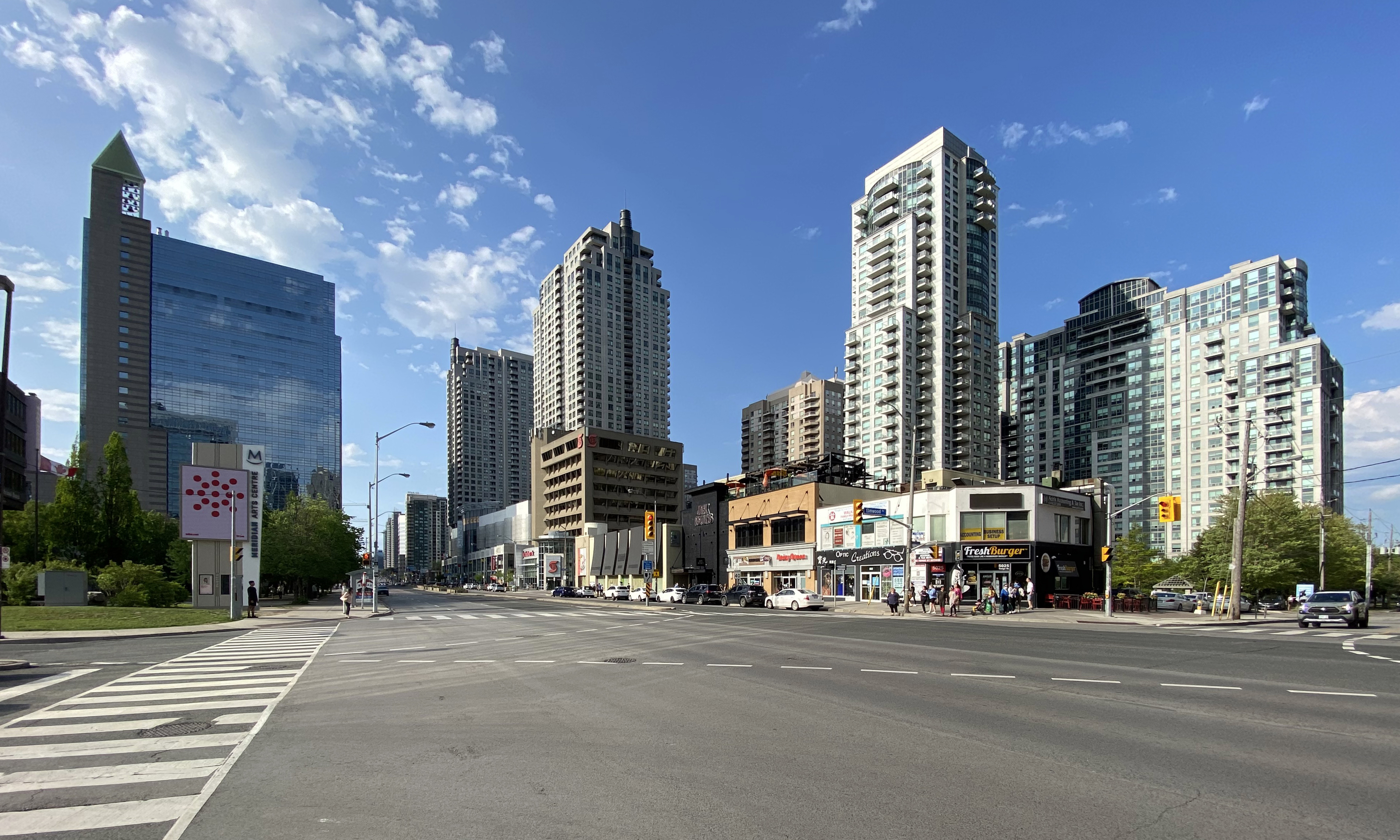
North York City Centre is the central business district of North York and is located on Yonge Street, between Finch and Sheppard Avenue.

The district's central business district is known as North York Centre, which was the location of the former city's government and major corporate headquarters. North York Centre continues to be one of Toronto's major corporate areas with many office buildings and businesses. The former city hall of North York, the North York Civic Centre, is located within North York City Centre.

Downsview Airport, near Sheppard and Allen Road, employs 1,800 workers. Downsview Airport will be the location of the Centennial College Aerospace campus, a $60 million investment from the Government of Ontario and Government of Canada. Private partners include Bombardier, Honeywell, MDA Corporation, Pratt & Whitney Canada, Ryerson University, Sumitomo Precision Products Canada Aircraft, Inc. and UTC Aerospace Systems.

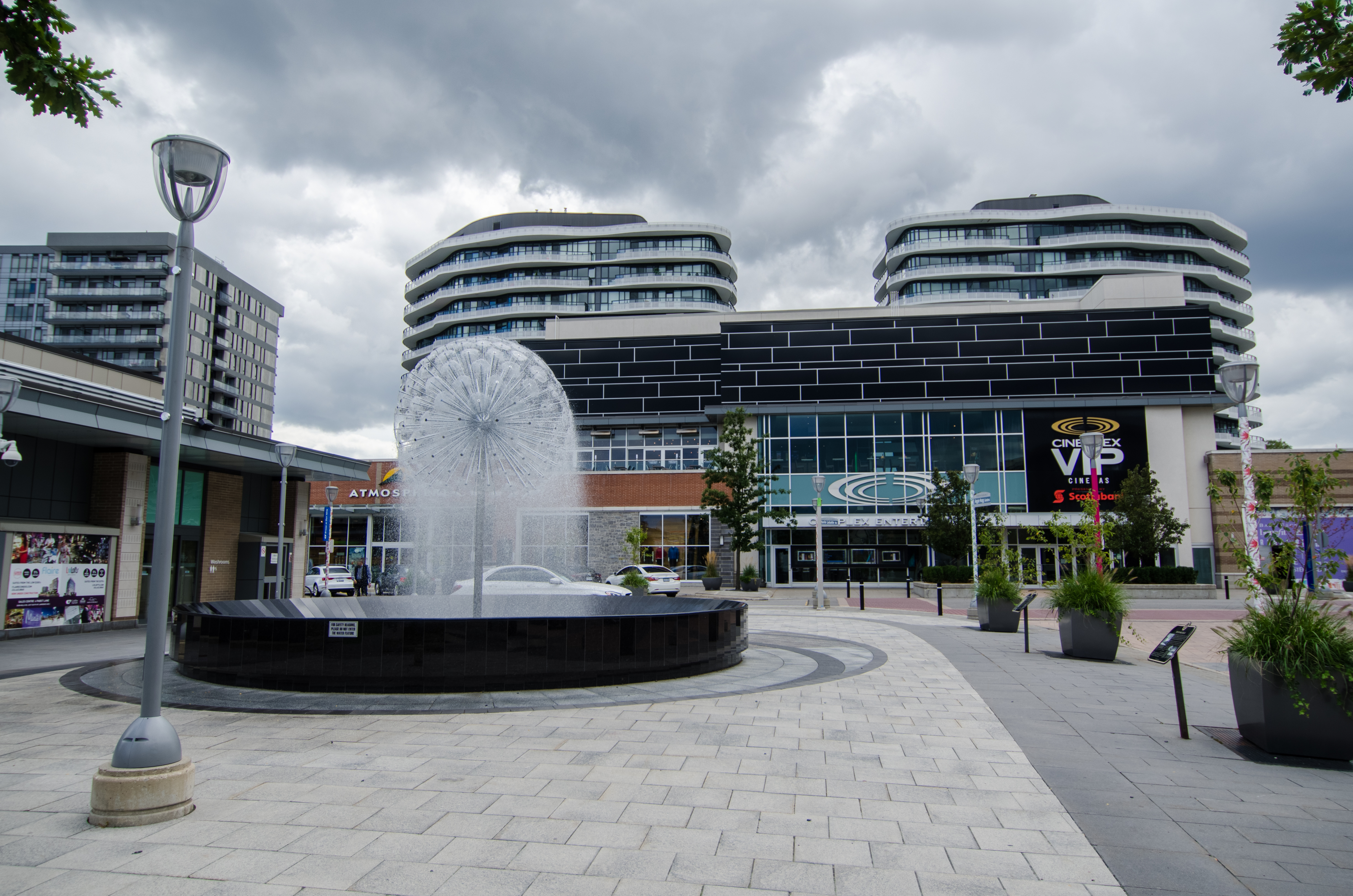
Shops at Don Mills is one of five major shopping malls in North York.

Flemingdon Park, located near Eglinton Avenue and Don Mills Road, is an economic hub located near the busy Don Valley Parkway and busy Toronto Transit Commission (TTC) routes. McDonald's Canada and Celestica are located in this area, and Foresters Insurance has a major office tower and Bell Canada has a data centre. The Concorde Corporate Centre has 550,000 ft^{2} (51,000 m^{2}) of leasable area and is 85% occupied with tenants such as Home Depot Canada, Sport Alliance of Ontario, Toronto-Dominion Bank, Esri Canada and Deloitte. Home Depot's Canadian head office is located in Flemingdon Park.

North York houses two of Toronto's five major shopping malls: the Yorkdale Shopping Centre and Fairview Mall. Other neighbourhood malls locations include Centerpoint Mall, Bayview Village, Sheridan Mall, Yorkgate Mall, Shops at Don Mills, Steeles West Market Mall, Jane Finch Mall and Sheppard Centre.

Health care is another major industry in North York, with the district housing several major hospitals, including the North York General Hospital, Hennick Humber Hospital and the Sunnybrook Health Sciences Centre.

== Education ==
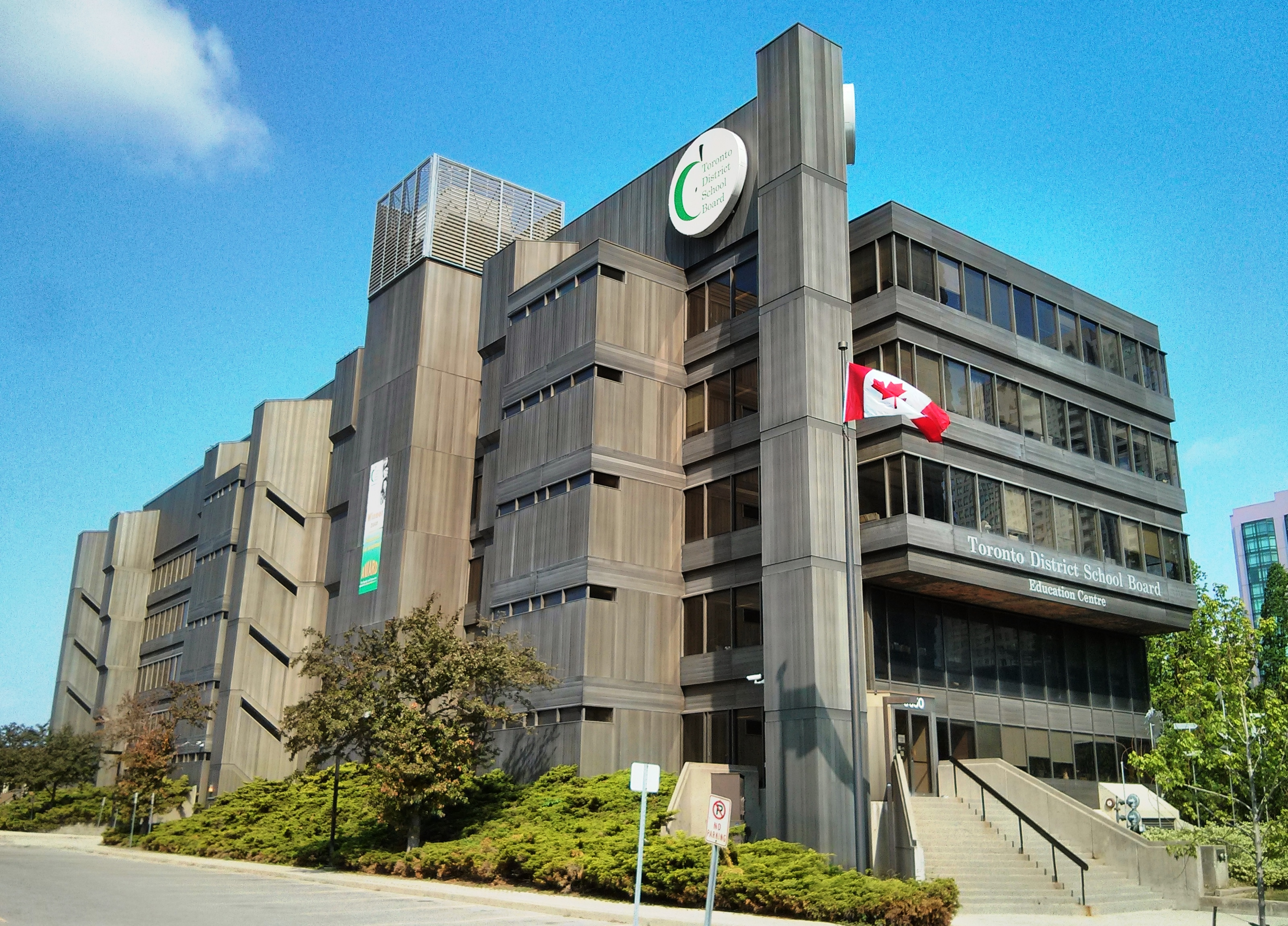
Headquarters of the Toronto District School Board in North York. All four Toronto-based public school boards are headquartered in North York.

Prior to 1998, the North York Board of Education and Conseil des écoles françaises de la communauté urbaine de Toronto operated English and French public secular schools in North York, while the Metropolitan Separate School Board operated English and French public separate schools for North York pupils. Today, four public school boards operate primary and secondary institutions in the former city:

- Conseil scolaire catholique MonAvenir (CSCM)
- Conseil scolaire Viamonde (CSV)
- Toronto Catholic District School Board (TCDSB)
- Toronto District School Board (TDSB)

CSV and TDSB operate as secular public school boards, the former operating French first language institution, whereas the latter operated English first language institutions. The other two school boards, CSCM and TCDSB, operate as public separate school boards, the former operating French first language separate schools, the latter operating English first language separate schools. All four public school boards are headquartered within North York.

In addition to primary and secondary schools, several post-secondary institutions were established in North York. York University is a university that was established in 1959. The university operates two campuses in North York, the Keele campus located in the north, and Glendon College, a bilingual campus operated by the university. There are also two colleges that operate campuses in North York. Seneca College was established in North York in 1967, and presently operates several campuses throughout North York, and Greater Toronto. One of Centennial College's campuses are also located in North York, known as the Downsview Park Aerospace Campus.

== Governance ==
North York is a district of the City of Toronto, and is represented by councillors elected to the Toronto City Council, members elected to the Legislative Assembly of Ontario, as well as members elected to the Parliament of Canada. North York Civic Centre is presently used by North York's community council and other city departments servicing North York.

Prior to North York's amalgamation with Toronto in 1998, North York operated as a lower-tier municipality within the Municipality of Metropolitan Toronto. The municipality operated its own municipal council, the North York City Council, and met at the North York Civic Centre prior to the municipality's dissolution. The following is a list of reeves (1922–1966) and mayors (1967–1997) of North York.

=== Reeves and mayors ===
Township of North York

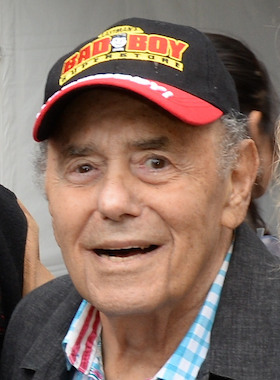
Mel Lastman was the last and longest-serving mayor of North York from 1973 to 1997 and went on to become the first mayor of the amalgamated city of Toronto until 2003.

- 1922–1929 Robert Franklin Hicks – born in 1866, Hicks was a dairy farmer who organized with other farmers to petition the Ontario legislature to carve out what was then the portion of York Township north of Eglinton Avenue to create the separate township of North York. During his period as the first reeve, the North York Hydro Commission, a public health board, and a water supply system were created and improvements were made to Yonge Street and other local roads. Hicks died in 1942.
- 1929–1930 James Muirhead – farmer in Leslie and Lawrence Ave area. Born in 1859 and lived on the same farm all of his life up to 1929 except for four years. Was chairman of the committee responsible for breaking North York away from York Township and a founding members of the township council.
- 1931–1933 George B. Elliott – also served as warden of York county in 1933. As reeve, faced demands for improved unemployment relief as the Depression worsened. Appointed inspector of hospital accounts for indigent patients in York county in 1934. Announced he would run for the federal Conservatives in a York North in 1934 but withdrew his name from consideration.
- 1934–1940 Robert Earl Bales – great-grandson of area pioneer John Bales, Earl Bales was North York's youngest reeve at 37. Earl Bales Park, which is on his family's former farmland, is named after him. Like many municipalities, North York was bankrupted by the cost of paying unemployment relied during the Great Depression. Under Bales' leadership, North York was one of the few bankrupted municipalities to be able to pay off its debt. Unlike many other Ontario municipalities, North York never seized any homes or farms for non-payment of taxes. Bales later sat on the North York planning board from 1947 until 1968.
- 1941–1949 George Herbert Mitchell also served in the Ontario legislature as CCF MPP for York North from 1943 to 1945, while serving as reeve. As reeve, kept track of expectant mothers come snowfall to ensure that the township's two snowplows kept open the sideroads around their homes. Mitchell was the last reeve to be elected by a predominantly rural electorate.
- 1950–1952 Nelson A. Boylen – reporter for The Evening Telegram (1912–1918) then in the dairy industry for 50 years. Served as a school trustee and then deputy reeve. Opposed the amalgamation of North York into Metropolitan Toronto, arguing that water shortages could be solved by creating a provincial water authority instead. Denied charges that North York was broke. Defeated in 1952 but later served as a councillor. Appointed to the Metro Toronto & Region Conservation Authority in the 1960s.
- 1953–1956 Frederick Joseph McMahon – supported the creation of Metropolitan Toronto. Ran as the Ontario Liberal Party candidate in York Centre in the 1955 provincial election, but was unsuccessful. A lawyer by profession, he was best known for defending bank robber Edwin Alonzo Boyd and his brother. McMahon later served as a provincial court judge.
- 1957–1958 Vernon M. Singer – went on to serve as MPP from 1959 to 1977
- 1959–1964 Norman C. Goodhead – as reeve, opposed illegal basement apartments and led a campaign to evict tenants. Stood for position of Metro Toronto Chairman in 1962 but lost to William Allen by four votes. Ran again for Metro Chairman in 1969, when no longer mayor, but lost to Scarborough mayor Albert Campbell.
- 1965–1966 James Ditson Service – defeated incumbent reeve Goodhead by running against Goodhead's support for amalgamating North York and the rest of Metro Toronto into a unitary city and alleging Goodhead was in a conflict of interest by owning a garbage disposal company that did business with the borough. Service campaigned on building the North York Civic Centre on Yonge Street and developing the area as a downtown with high-density office buildings. He also advocated building a 62,000 domed stadium on surplus land transferred from Downsview Airport. In private business, he co-founded CHIN Radio/TV International with Johnny Lombardi, also founding CHIN (AM) radio but later fell out with him. After he was mayor, Service became a property developer.

Borough of North York

- 1967–1969 James Ditson Service
- 1970–1972 Basil H. Hall – supported the construction and extension of the Spadina Expressway and continued to do so after the provincial government cancelled the project. After he was mayor, he served on the board of the provincially owned Urban Transportation Development Corporation.
- 1973–1978 Mel Lastman

City of North York

- 1979–1997 Mel Lastman – served as first mayor of the amalgamated city of Toronto from 1998 to 2003.

=== Board of Control ===
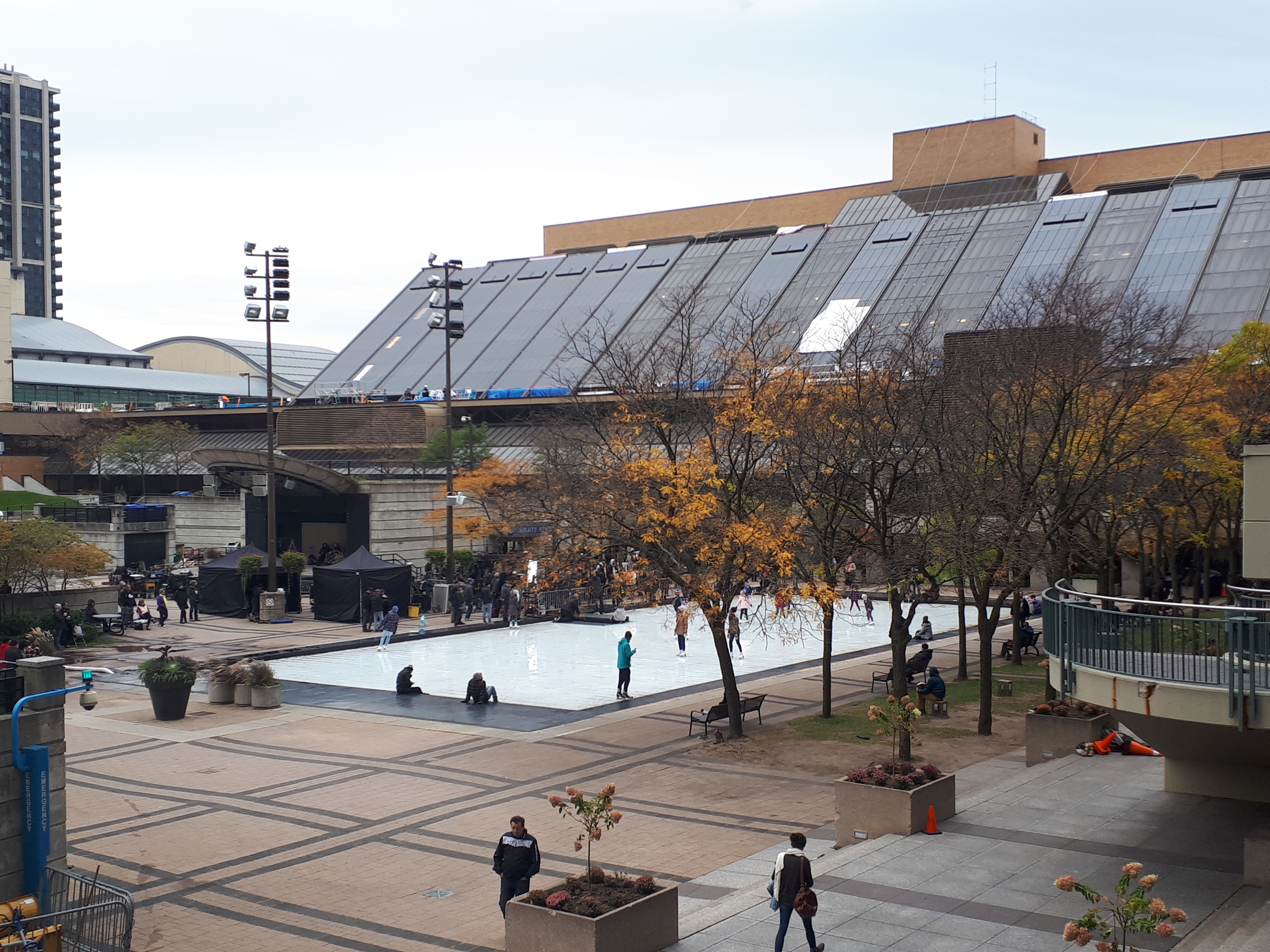
The North York Civic Centre is home to the district's community council, as well as other municipal services.

North York had a Board of Control from 1964 until it was abolished with the 1988 election and replaced by directly elected Metro Councillors. The Board of Control consisted of four Controllers elected at large and the mayor and served as the executive committee of North York Council. Controllers concurrently sat on Metropolitan Toronto Council

Names in italics indicate Controllers that were or became Mayor of North York in other years. X = elected as Controller
A = appointed Controller to fill a vacancy
M = sitting as Reeve or Mayor

Elections to the Board of Control for North York (1964–1985)
Controller	1964	1966	1969	1972	1974	1976	1978	1980	1982	1985
James Ditson Service	M	M								
G. Gordon Hurlburt	X	X								
Irving Paisley	X		X				X			
Frank Watson	X	X								
Basil H. Hall	X	X	M							
Paul Hunt		X	X							
Mel Lastman			X	M	M	M	M	M	M	M
John Booth^{[A]}			X							
Paul Godfrey^{[A]}			A	X						
John Williams				X						
Alex McGivern				X	X					
Barbara Greene				X	X	X	X		X	
William Sutherland^{[A]}				A	X			X	X	
Joseph Markin					X					
Esther Shiner^{[B]}						X	X	X	X	X
Ron Summers						X				
Robert Yuill						X	X	X	X	X
Norm Gardner								X		X
Howard Moscoe										X
Mario Gentile										A

^ABooth died in 1970 and was replaced by Paul Godfrey who served out the balance of his term. Godfrey was reelected in 1972, but resigned when he was elected Metro Chairman in 1973 following the death of Metro Chairman Albert Campbell. North York Council elected Alderman William Sutherland to replace Godfrey on the Board of Control on July 23, 1973.

^BShiner died on 19 December 1987. Councillor Mario Gentile was appointed to the Board of Control in February 1988 to fill Shiner's seat.

== Media ==
- North York Mirror: A weekly community newspaper (thrice and then twice weekly in earlier times) covering North York. Part of Torstar's Metroland chain of community newspapers. The newspaper was launched in 1957 and ceased publication in 2023 when it was folded into the toronto.com website along with other Toronto-based Metroland titles.
- Salam Toronto: Bilingual Persian-English weekly paper for the Iranian community of North York.

== Recreation ==
=== Museums ===
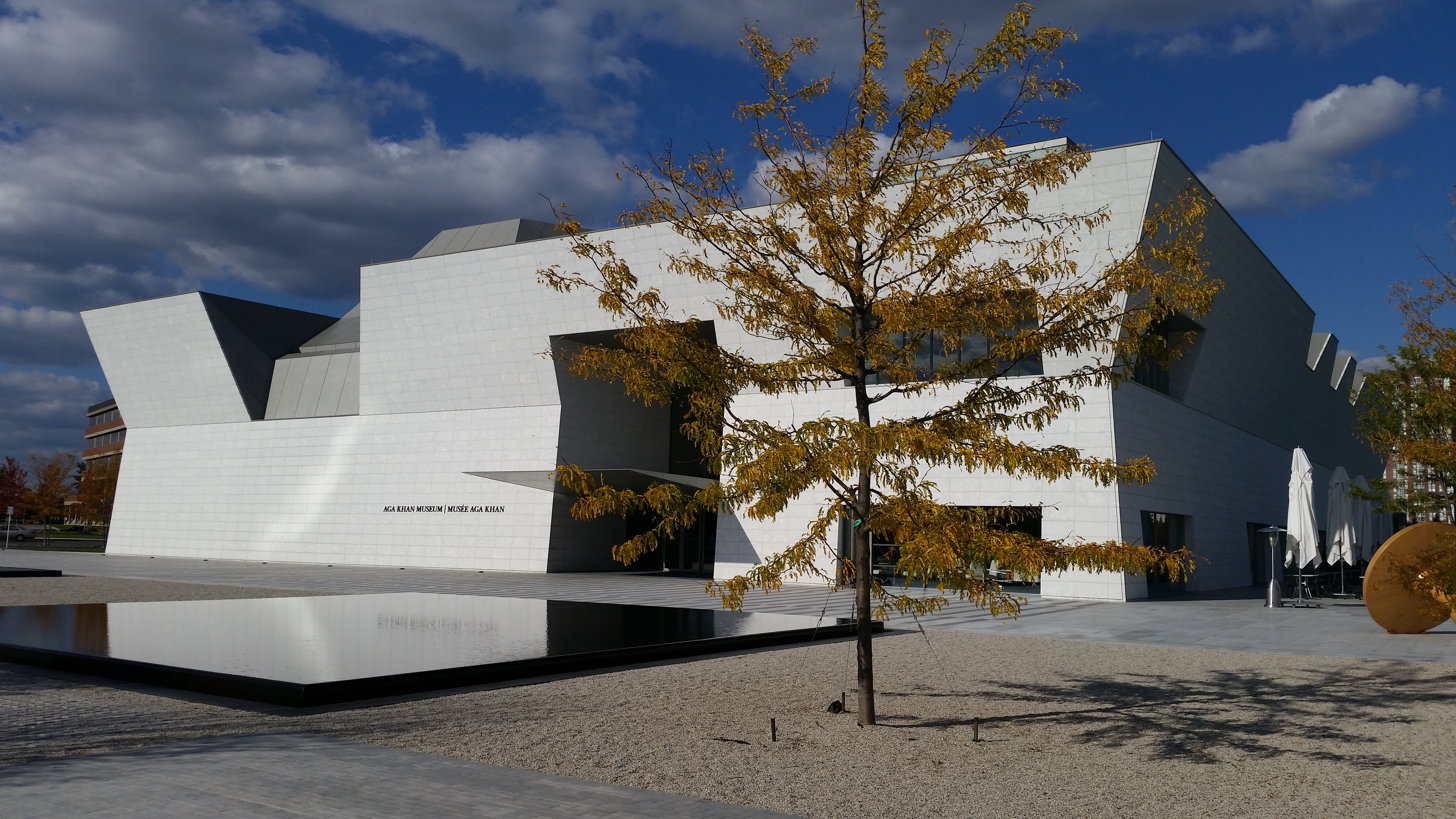
The Aga Khan Museum is one of several museums located in North York.

North York is home to several museums including the (now closed) Canadian Air and Space Museum (formerly the Toronto Aerospace Museum) in Downsview Park. The closed museum was relocated to Edenvale, Ontario in 2019 (northwest of Barrie) and opened and renamed as the "Canadian Air and Space Conservancy". North York is also home to a number of interactive museums, including Black Creek Pioneer Village, an authentic nineteenth-century village and a living museum, the Ontario Science Centre was an interactive science museum which was permanently closed in June, 2024, and the Aga Khan Museum, which includes a collection of Islamic art from the Middle-East and Northern Africa.

=== Sports ===
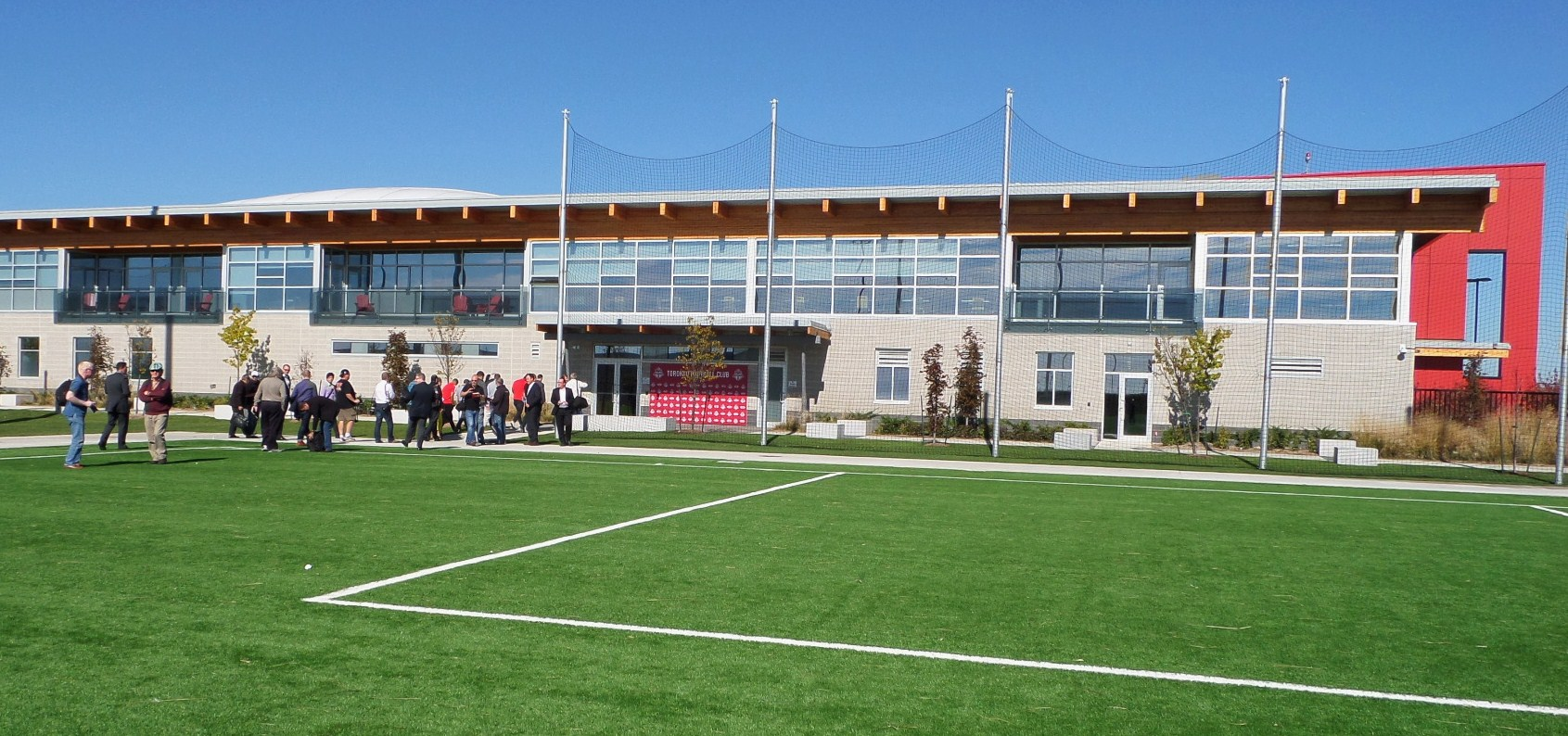
Soccer pitch at the KIA Training Ground, the practice facility for the Toronto FC.

An aircraft manufacturing facility and a former military base are located in the Downsview neighbourhood. With the end of the Cold War, much of the land was transformed into a large park now called Downsview Park. Located within the park is the Downsview Park Sports Centre, a 45,000 m^{2} (484,000 sq ft) multi-purpose facility built by Maple Leaf Sports & Entertainment (MLSE), owners of Toronto FC, of Major League Soccer. MLSE invested $26 million to build the Kia Training Ground, the state-of-the-art practice facility for Toronto FC. Volleyball Canada made Downsview Park its headquarters and training facility.

There are a multitude of sports clubs based in North York including the North York Storm, a girls' hockey league, Gwendolen Tennis Club, and the North York Aquatic Club, which was founded in 1958 as the North York Lions Swim Club. The Granite Club, located at Bayview and Lawrence, is an invitation-only athletic club. In 2012, the club made a major expansion in North York for their members.

The Oakdale Golf & Country Club is a private, parkland-style golf and tennis club located in North York. It hosted the 2023 Canadian Open, and will host the tournament again in 2026.

The North York Ski Centre at Earl Bales Park is one of the only urban ski centres of its kind in Canada. After several incidents involving failures of the club's two-person chairlift incited talks of closing the ski centre, the city revitalized the facilities with a new four-person chairlift. Sports clubs based in North York include:

- York United FC – member of Canadian Premier League
- Toronto FC II – member of USL League One
- North York Astros – member of Canadian Soccer League
- North York Rockets – (defunct) Canadian Soccer League (1987–1992)
- North York Rangers – member of the Central Division of the
  Ontario Junior Hockey League

== Transportation ==
Several major controlled-access highways pass through North York, including Highway 400, Highway 401, Highway 404, Allen Road, and the Don Valley Parkway. The former three controlled access highways are operated by the province as 400-series highways, whereas the latter two roadways are managed by the City of Toronto. The section of Highway 401 which traverses North York is the busiest section of freeway in North America, exceeding 400,000 vehicles per day, and one of the widest.

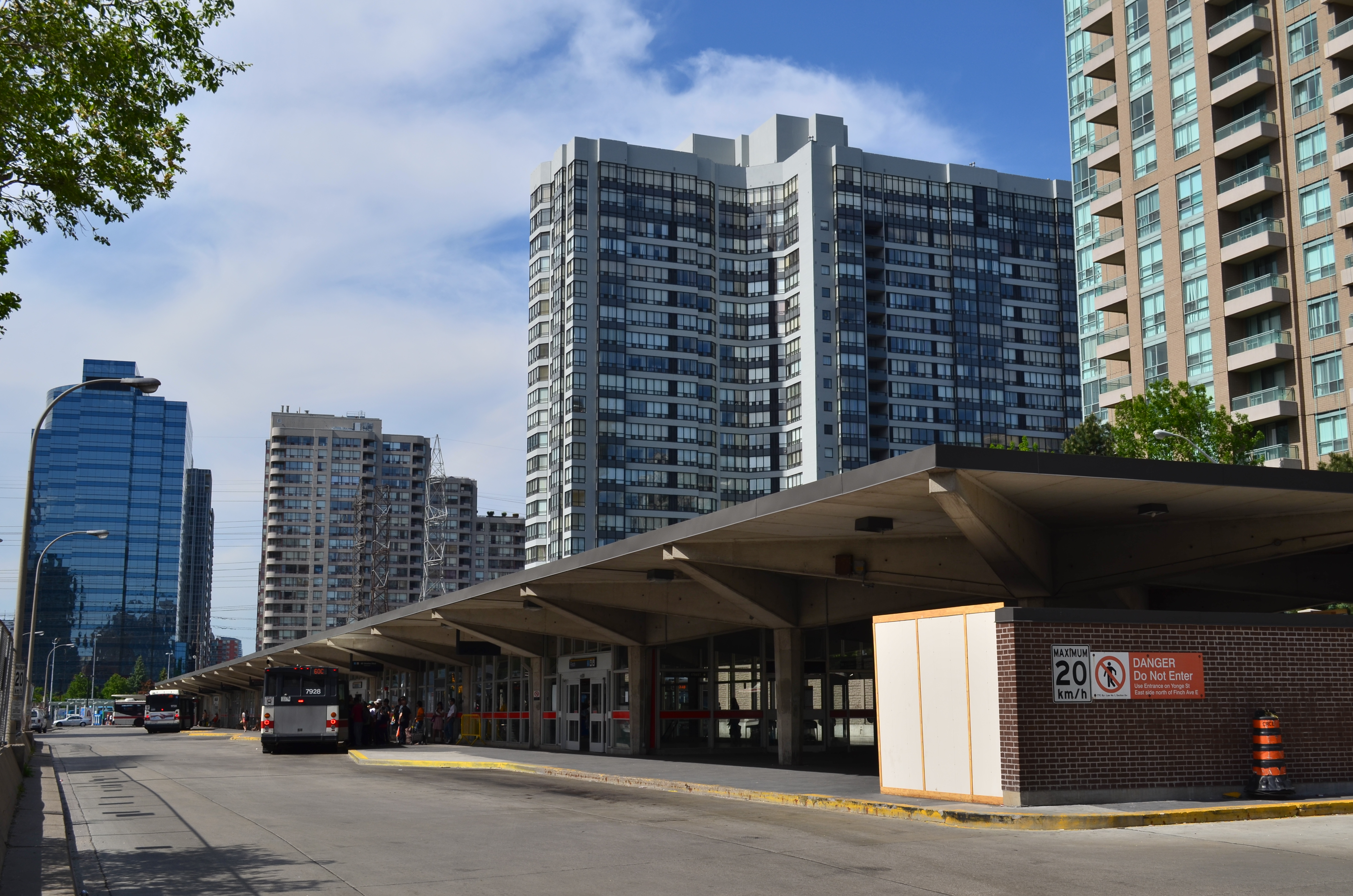
A Toronto Transit Commission bus terminal outside of Finch subway station.

Public transportation in North York is primarily provided by the Toronto Transit Commission's (TTC) bus or subway system. Two lines of the Toronto subway have stations in North York, the Line 1 Yonge–University, and Line 4 Sheppard. Finch station, the terminus of the Yonge Street branch of the Yonge–University line, is the busiest TTC bus station and the sixth-busiest subway station, serving around 97,460 people per day. The Line 4 Sheppard subway which runs from its intersection with the Yonge-University line at Sheppard Avenue easterly to Fairview Mall at Don Mills Road, is entirely in North York, averaging around 55,000 riders per day. Line 5 Eglinton is a light rail line that is under construction and will traverse through the southeast portion of North York. Line 6 Finch West is another line under construction and will traverse through the northwestern portion of North York. The Ontario Line is expected to have two stops in North York, Science Centre and Flemingdon Park. The intersection of York Mills and Yonge, located next to York Mills station is home to an office and a TTC commuter parking lot, which was sold for $25 million. A $300-million project is expected to create about 300 jobs and bring a new hotel, perhaps a four star Marriott, to the intersection.

In addition to the TTC, other public transit services that may be accessed from North York include GO Transit, and York Region Transit. GO Transit provides access to commuter rail and bus services to communities throughout Greater Toronto. Both services may be accessed at GO or TTC stations located in North York.

== Notable people ==
- Michael Adamthwaite (born 1981), voice actor
- Liane Balaban (born 1980), actress
- Andy Borodow (born 1969), Olympic wrestler
- John Bregar (born 1985), actor
- Oshae Brissett (born 1998), Israeli Basketball Premier League, former NBA, basketball player
- Chris Campoli, professional ice hockey player
- Candi & The Backbeat, pop band
- Kurtis Conner (born 1994), stand-up comedian and YouTuber
- Tie Domi, former professional ice hockey player
- Louis Ferreira, actor
- Yani Gellman (born 1985), film and television actor
- Paul Godfrey, former president of the Toronto Blue Jays and former chairman of Metropolitan Toronto
- James Hinchcliffe, professional auto racing driver, born here
- Adrianne Ho, model, designer, and director
- Michael Kerzner, Solicitor General of Ontario
- Mel Lastman, long-time Mayor of North York, and the first Mayor of the amalgamated city of Toronto
- Nicholas Latifi, professional auto racing driver, grew up in North York
- Geddy Lee (born 1953), rock musician
- Matt Moulson, professional ice hockey player
- George Nagy (born 1957), Olympic swimmer in the butterfly
- Peter Polansky (born 1988), tennis player
- Rambha, Indian actress, settled here
- Gary Roberts, former professional ice hockey player
- Ya'ara Saks, Canadian Minister of Mental Health and Addictions and Associate Minister of Health
- Sam Schachter (born 1990), Olympic beach volleyball player
- Barry Sherman, pharmaceutical company executive and founder of Apotex.
- Olivia Smith (born 2004), soccer player for the Canada national team
- Snow, reggae musician
- Andy Yerzy (born 1998), baseball catcher and first baseman in the St. Louis Cardinals organization

== See also ==
- List of neighbourhoods in North York
- Moatfield Ossuary
