= CHIN-FM =

Multilingual radio station in Toronto

Coordinates: 43.65520°N 79.41495°W

- Toronto, Ontario; Canada
- Frequency: 100.7 MHz (HD Radio)
- Branding: CHIN Radio

Programming
- Format: Multilingual
- Subchannels: HD2: CHIN simulcast; HD3: CHIN-FM-1 simulcast; HD4: CJLL-FM simulcast

Ownership
- Owner: CHIN Radio/TV International; (Radio 1540 Limited)
- Sister stations: CHIN, CHIN-1-FM

History
- First air date: 1967
- Call sign meaning: Canada Happiness International and also the Italian drinking toast cin cin.

Technical information
- Class: C1
- ERP: 7,750 watts
- HAAT: 449 meters (1,473 ft)

Links
- Webcast: Listen Live
- Website: chinradio.com

CHIN-FM (100.7 MHz) is a commercial radio station in Toronto, Ontario, Canada. It broadcasts a Multilingual radio format and is owned by CHIN Radio/TV International. It is co-owned with CHIN 1540 AM and CHIN-1-FM at 91.9 MHz. All three stations have separate ethnic programme schedules. The studios and offices are on College Street in the Palmerston-Little Italy neighbourhood of Toronto.

CHIN-FM has an effective radiated power (ERP) of 7,750 watts. The transmitter is atop the CN Tower.

== Programming ==
CHIN-FM's weekday programming is primarily in Portuguese, Mandarin, Cantonese, and South Asian languages. On weekends, Kurdish, Serbian, Slovenian and Caribbean programming is also heard.

== History ==
CHIN-FM first signed on in 1967. The previous year, CHIN 1540 began broadcasting ethnic programming, one of the first multilingual stations in Canada. Its owners were granted a construction permit to add an FM station in Toronto with separate ethnic programming.

CHIN-AM-FM were started by Toronto broadcaster Johnny Lombardi and his then-partner James Ditson Service, a former mayor of North York. They saw a need for multilingual radio for Toronto's growing ethnic communities.

Former logo
