= CJLL-FM =

Multilingual radio station in Ottawa

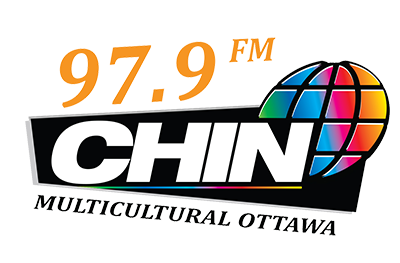
- Ottawa, Ontario; Canada
- Broadcast area: National Capital Region
- Frequency: 97.9 MHz
- Branding: CHIN Ottawa

Programming
- Format: Multi-language

Ownership
- Owner: CHIN Radio/TV International; (Radio 1540 Limited)

History
- First air date: 2003
- Call sign meaning: Johnny Barbalinardo Lombardi (company founder)

Technical information
- Class: B1
- ERP: 6,770 watts
- HAAT: 117.5 metres (385 ft)
- Transmitter coordinates: 45°25′09″N 75°42′18″W
- Repeater: 100.7 CHIN-HD4 (Toronto)

Links
- Webcast: Listen Live
- Website: CHIN Ottawa

CJLL-FM is a Canadian radio station, which broadcasts multilingual community programming at 97.9 FM in Ottawa, Ontario, with studios located on Wellington Street West in Ottawa, while its transmitter is located in downtown Ottawa. Although CJLL has a very different call sign than its Toronto sibling stations CHIN and CHIN-FM, it shares their branding as CHIN Ottawa.

== History ==
On October 4, 2001, the CRTC approved the application by CHIN Radio/TV International, the owner of the multilingual stations CHIN and CHIN-FM in Toronto, for a broadcasting licence for a specialty FM ethnic radio station in the National Capital Region at 97.9 MHz. The station was launched in 2003 out of studios at 30 Murray Street in the ByWard Market neighborhood, which later became home to the Philippine Embassy in Ottawa.

CJLL airs programming in over 20 languages, serving up to 40 different cultural communities. Mornings feature programming primarily in Arabic and Italian, while Spanish and Chinese (Cantonese & Mandarin) programming airs in the evenings. On evenings and weekends CHIN airs programming in Caribbean, Dutch, German, Greek, Gujarati, Haitian, Hindi, Hungarian, Korean, Persian, Portuguese, Punjabi, Romanian, Russian, Ukrainian and Urdu languages.
