= Moatfield Ossuary =

- Moatfield Ossuary in Ontario
- 43.7631°N 79.3590°W
- Cultures: Iroquoian (Ontario) Wendat (Huron)
- Associated with: The Six Nations Council of Oshweken

Site notes
- Excavation dates: September 26, 1997 - December 12, 1997

The Moatfield Ossuary was accidentally discovered during the expansion of a soccer field located in North York, Ontario in the summer of 1997. Upon identifying both Wendat artifacts and human remains, a team of archaeologists was contracted by the province to conduct an archaeological investigation and recover the human remains. The Six Nations Council of Oshweken, provided consent to analyze the human remains, however the time to do so was limited as the remains were to be reburied December 12 the same year.

== Background ==
Ossuaries have long been a known burial practice among the Ontario Iroquoians. Early ethnohistoric accounts combined with archaeological, osteological research have provided a window into cultural aspects of Iroquoian death and burial as well as the larger social, economical and political context of the time. Based on radiocarbon dates for three early Iroquoian ossuary pits a developed ossuary tradition had arisen by the A.D. 1000-1300 period. It is believed the ossuary tradition developed in response to an increased need for integration of members of different families for the purpose of agricultural production. At the same time, we begin to see evidence of semi-subterranean sweat lodges appear in the archaeological record, and thought to have functioned to integrate men from different families within the community.

It has been argued by Ritchie and Funk, Trigger, Wright, and Williamson and MacDonald that the ossuary burial practice is tied to inter village alliances with socio-political systems based on matrilineal kinship. The need to create and solidify ties within communities can be seen through the evolution of ossuaries and the variation between different affiliated groups, including contemporaneous ones.

== Discovery ==
The Moatfield ossuary was discovered in 1997 in North York, Toronto, Ontario, during the redevelopment of a soccer field. Artifacts from the site confirmed it to be a Middle Iroquoian village (AD 1280 – AD 1320). Following consultation with the Six Nations Council of Oshweken, the province contracted Archaeology Services Inc. to undertake an investigation of the ossuary located on the periphery of the site.

== Archaeological Excavation ==
The Six Nations Council agreed to allow a group of archaeologists to excavate the entirety of the ossuary and remove all skeletal remains. Excavation of the site began on September 6, 1997 and was completed on December 12 of the same year. The ossuary itself was found 30 centimetres beneath the surface and was slightly elliptical in shape. The long axis was oriented in an east to west direction and measured 2.4 metres in length; the north-south axis measured 2 metres in length.

The site was impacted through modern anthropogenic modifications of the landscape. Most noticeable was a concrete-filled posthole for a chain-link fence. The auguring of the posthole was the cause for discovery of both the Moatfield village and ossuary. Despite the unearthing of human remains, construction continued and the posthole was filled with concrete; an action that impacted the bones immediately adjacent and below the posthole. Electrical wiring and water pipes also transected the site but had no direct effect on the ossuary.

As the human remains were excavated, the location of each bone was recorded on a map and photographed prior to being removed from the site. Photographs were also taken to document any articulations, pathologies, or groupings of bones. Upon removal, special care was taken to protect any bones that may be lost or damaged. For example, all maxillae bones and mandibles were wrapped to prevent the teeth from falling out and crania were removed with soil still attached (a measure that helps to prevent the bones from fragmenting). These and other large elements like long bones, scapulae, sacra, and innominate bones were bagged individually and assigned their own unique catalogue number. All small elements (e.g. individual tarsals, carpals, vertebrae, ribs and loose teeth) were placed together in a bag that was representative of the 20 centimetre grid unit they came from. Anything articulated was left intact, bagged intact, and assigned one catalogue number.

== Artifacts ==
Although the site primarily contained human remains, there were a few artifacts found as well. Items found included a ceramic pipe fragment, a complete ceramic effigy pipe, several ceramic vessel sherds, and a shattered piece of chert. Of the artifacts, the best preserved was the ceramic effigy pipe, which was designed and decorated to symbolize a turtle. A variety of animal bones (both aquatic and mammalian) were also found. The species identified included Atlantic salmon, American eel, mouse (either deer mouse or white-footed mouse), and a bear. There were also several fish bones that were either tentatively identified or unidentifiable.

== Taphonomy ==
Due to the time restrictions placed on the excavation of the Moatfield Ossuary, an extensive analysis of site taphonomy could not be conducted. Despite the lack of time however, the archaeologists were able to conclude that the human remains had not been exposed to the elements nor did they show evidence of animal activity (with the exception of three bones). They further concluded that the lack of cutmarks or other alterations suggested that the individuals were moved from a primary burial site to the Moatfield ossuary at a later time (secondary burial). Most of the bones were undamaged and although the skulls may have been cracked, they were not shattered. The remains seemed to have been placed into the ossuary with great care and planning. Until the time of modern construction and subsequent excavation, the remains appeared to have been left undisturbed.

== Ossuary Formation ==
The remains in the ossuary were placed with great care and were undamaged at the time of burial. In order to maximise the use of space, the remains were packed very tightly together; so tight that it was nearly impossible to identify individual skeletons unless articulated. Due to the tightly compacted nature of this ossuary, bones were broken or bent in the shape of the walls (particularly long bones). These fractures are not consistent with trampling and because the broken ends remained in close proximity, it was interpreted that great care was taken to minimize damage to the bones in the filling and packing of the ossuary.

== Main Ideas of Osteobiographical analysis ==
The purpose of analyzing the ossuary was to piece together who the Moatfield people were, what happened to them, and what can the archaeologists know about their way of life. This was done by analyzing the bones and bone fragments found in the ossuary.

== Difficulties ==
There were difficulties matching bones to one another due to the high amount of commingling of remains. Also, many bones in the body mature at different stages and therefore one individual may show maturation of some bones while still developing others. This made piecing together of entire individuals difficult and thus making inferences regarding health of individuals less distinct. Also, the sex of individuals was not clear since the entire skeletons were not able to be articulated.

== Data ==
The minimum number of individuals represented by the bones found was 87 in total, including 58 adults and 29 juveniles. The counts done by the post-cranial remains equalled 78 in total: 52 adults and 26 juveniles. More cranial remains were found than post-cranial in the site.

== Health of the Moatfield people ==
Based on the extensive osteological (bone) examination, the archaeologists were able to infer the health of the people represented in the ossuary. Although not all health problems show symptoms on bones, the information gathered gives some insight on the health of the society.

There were very few examples of bones showing signs of healing from trauma and none of the bones showed any evidence that there was warfare in the society. A few of the healed fractures imply that long-term care was given to individuals who were injured. Very few bones showed any signs of inflammatory bone changes. However, over half of the juveniles crania (skulls) showed evidence of anemia (iron deficiency). This was represented by what is known as cribra orbitalia. This implies that the society had many young children with chronic illness before their death.

At least four adults showed symptoms of pulmonary or other forms of tuberculosis which is evident by the loss of bone tissue. However this is not a significant number of adults in the sample size, it does show that infections to this degree were present in the society. There was only one adult individual who showed any signs of cancer. This is known by evidence found on the skull of the individual. One individual was bundled relatively completely, separating it from the other bones which enabled the archaeologists to make inferences on the entire skeleton rather than individual bones. The changes noted on the bones showed clear signs of old age. This is important because older individuals are sometimes lost in the archaeological record due to the frailty of their bones.

Isotopic and dental analysis were undertaken to determine what the inhabitants were eating, how food sources were being procured and the effects this had on the health of the population. Results of the isotopic analysis conducted on a sample of teeth form the population evidenced the Moatfield inhabitants had a diet high in maize. Fluctuations observed in the maize consumption over time illustrate a peak period in maize production followed by a subsequent decrease. Individuals who had died and been interred in the ossuary at early, had a diet consisting of approximately 54% maize. Over time this increased to 70%, then dropped to 60%.

The health consequences of a diet as high in maize consumption that was seen in the later years of the ossuary, typically show anemia visible in skeletal remains due to deficiencies in amino acids such as lysine and tryptophan. Additionally, low quantities of metals such as zinc form this diet also lead to delayed skeletal development. Surprisingly however, these pathologies were not observed on the remains of the Moatfield individuals. The most likely explanation for this is the consumption of fish from Lake Ontario and local streams that were identified in the faunal collection of the site.

The dental analysis for the Moatfield population focused on patterns of caries (cavities), abscessing, wear, and antemortem tooth loss. Dental analysis was divided into two study collections due to the disarticulated nature of the remains: maxillary specimens and mandibular specimens. The general patterns observed evidenced greater caries and antemortem loss in the mandibular collection, and more abscessing in the maxillary collection. Caries were found to be significantly lower in women, with an increase in caries corresponding to an increase in age. Men evidenced a higher number in caries with no discernible changes related to age. Attrition was found to be moderate. Abscessing quantification is ambiguous at best as it does not adequately account for areas of antemortem tooth loss.

Factors contributing to poor dental health among the Moatfield include: no evidence of dental hygiene; low fluoride content in local soils; high starch (maize) consumption that adheres to teeth.

No analysis of other factors including ritual removal of teeth, use of teeth as a tool for activities such as hide work was noted. It is unclear if no evidence was found or if time constraints precluded this type of analysis.

Part of the skeletal analysis included findings of maxillary sinusitis. Approximately 60% of the remains recovered from the Moatfield ossuary exhibited skeletal pathology consistent with maxillary sinusitis. Although not all cases of this pathology will leave evidence on bone, the results do provide a significant indicator of living conditions and overall health of the population. The predominance of individuals under the age of 12 showed minimal symptoms, however after reaching adulthood prevalence increases and remains high throughout all age groups.

The primary factors attributed to this pathology are typically diet and living conditions. The present studies attribute the Moatfield population to living conditions, specifically smoke inhalation from closed quarters within longhouses. The maxillary sinusitis as evidenced by the amount of lesions and remodelling on bone are suggestive of chronic infections. Though not generally of cause of death on its own, the prevalence of maxillary sinusitis did predispose the Moatfield inhabitants to other respiratory infections such as tuberculosis, which was found to be a common cause of death.

== Discussion/Conclusion ==
The Moatfield site provides a rare snapshot into the lives of Iroquonians from the 13th Century. Evidence indicates the ossuary was a cemetery for one community. The key here is that it served a community, not just a family or a specific kin group, a pattern that is more typically seen in populations from this period. Health patterns observed in the remains evidence a reliance on agriculture, and this reliance changed over time. Regardless of the changes, a continuity in the relationship between the dead and the living was maintained. The socio-political patterns associated with the evolving agricultural subsistence base, are reflected in the bones of Moatfield people.

The remains were reburied less than six month later on December 18, 1997. In the small window of time between the initial finding and reburial, the Six Nations Council and researchers came together and were able to share part of the story of the Moatfield inhabitants with future generations.
