= James Ditson Service =

American lawyer, politician, and radio founder (1926–2013)

1st Mayor of North York
- In office 1 January 1967 – 31 December 1969
- Preceded by: Position created
- Succeeded by: Basil Hall

10th Reeve of North York
- In office 1 January 1965 – 31 December 1966
- Preceded by: Norman C. Goodhead
- Succeeded by: position abolished

Personal details
- Born: James Ditson Service; May 24, 1926 Toronto, Ontario, Canada
- Died: August 1, 2014 (aged 88) Toronto, Ontario
- Party: non-party (municipal)
- Other political affiliations: Ontario Liberal Party
- Education: University of Toronto; Osgoode Hall Law School
- Profession: lawyer, businessman

James Ditson Service, QC (1926 – August 1, 2014) was a lawyer, co-founder of CHIN Radio, property developer and the first mayor of North York, Ontario as well as its last reeve.

Service was born in Toronto, where he attended North Toronto Collegiate and the University of Toronto. He then attended Osgoode Hall Law School and was called to the bar in 1954. He was a practicing lawyer for 44 years and was appointed Queen's Counsel in 1983.

He entered politics in 1958, was elected to North York township council in 1958 as councillor for Ward 7, and was re-elected in 1960. In 1962, he ran for reeve of North York but was defeated by incumbent reeve Norman C. Goodhead. He ran in the 1963 Ontario general election as an Ontario Liberal Party candidate in York Mills but came in second. He ran for reeve again in 1964 and this time was successful in unseating Goodhead on a platform of slowing down the municipality's rapid development in order to allow for greater planning. Service also campaigned against Goodhead's support for amalgamating North York and the rest of Metro Toronto into a unitary city and alleged Goodhead was in a conflict of interest by owning a garbage disposal company that did business with the borough. Service campaigned on building the North York Civic Centre on Yonge Street and developing the area as a downtown with high-density office buildings. As reeve, he led the second-largest municipality in Metropolitan Toronto after the Old City of Toronto. North York was also the fourth largest municipality in Canada at the time. As well as being reeve, Service was also a member of the Metropolitan Toronto Council as well as Metro's executive committee.

When Metro was reorganized effective January 1, 1967, with its 13 municipalities being consolidated into six, North York's status changed from a township to a borough, with the position of reeve being changed to mayor. Service thus was North York's last reeve and won the December 5, 1966 municipal election to become its first mayor. Service advocated that North York ultimately become a city in its own right, along with Scarborough and Etobicoke, and the Metropolitan Toronto be dissolved.

In June 1969, he proposed building a domed stadium on surplus land belonging to Downsview Airport. Though he had the support of North York's council, he was unable to secure the land from the federal government or funding for the project from the federal and provincial governments. Service did not run for re-election in the December 1969 election.

As a property developer, Service and his partner built townhouses in London, Ontario and an apartment building in St. Catharines, Ontario, as well as a townhouse in Don Mills and a subdivision in Aurora, Ontario. His involvement in property development led critics to accuse him of being in a conflict of interest as reeve, and then mayor, but he was cleared of impropriety by the courts in 1967.

Service partnered with Johnny Lombardi to buy Radio 1540 Ltd from Ted Rogers in order to found radio station CHIN-AM. In his capacity as a lawyer, he drafted CHIN's successful application to the Canadian Radio-television and Telecommunications Commission for CHIN-FM. By 1970s the, relations between Service and Lombardi had broken down and Service asked the CRTC to strip award him and another minority shareholder the station's license, without Lombardi. The CRTC declined to intervene in the dispute. Later that year, Lombardi bought Service and the other partner out.

Service and several partners bought land in Etobicoke to create the Highland Curling Club in 1961, with Service having the responsibility for the construction of the building.
