= CHIN Radio/TV International =

Canadian radio and TV broadcasting company

CHIN Radio
- Industry: Radio and television broadcasting
- Founded: 1966; 60 years ago in Toronto, Ontario
- Founder: Johnny Lombardi
- Headquarters: Toronto, Ontario, Canada
- Key people: Lenny Lombardi (president)
- Website: www.chinradio.com

CHIN Radio/TV International (legally known as Radio 1540 Limited) is a Canadian radio and television broadcasting company, which owns and operates four radio stations and a television program production unit, all targeting multilingual communities. The company also holds the annual CHIN Picnic. CHIN's studios are located on College Street in the Palmerston-Little Italy neighbourhood of Toronto.

== History ==
Johnny Lombardi, an Italian Canadian bought Radio 1540 Limited from Rogers Broadcasting in 1965 with James Ditson Service, a lawyer and local politician. They launched the radio station in the Spring of 1966. The two later had a falling out over the management of the station and Lombardi bought out Service in 1970. When Lombardi died in 2002, ownership of CHIN Radio/TV International passed to his son Lenny and daughter Theresa.

In 2017, the company produced and aired programming in 50 different languages.

== Radio stations ==
- Toronto
  - CHIN AM 1540
  - CHIN-1-FM 91.9 (replacing an earlier 101.3), originally an FM rebroadcaster of AM 1540
  - CHIN-FM 100.7
- Ottawa
  - CJLL-FM 97.9

== Television ==
CHIN also produces ten hours a week of television programming, which airs on CITY-DT on Saturday and Sunday mornings. CHIN produces television programming for the Portuguese, Caribbean, Pakistani, Hindi-speaking, Polish, Persian, Russian, Punjabi and Italian communities in Toronto. CHIN television programming originally aired on CIII-DT, and later, briefly, on CKVR-DT.

== CHIN Picnic ==
One of Toronto's most popular annual multicultural events, the CHIN Picnic is held every summer. The event, which spans several days, includes musical and dance performers and has included amusement park rides, an international shopping bazaar and international food concessions.

The first CHIN Picnic, originally called the "Spaghetti Dig-In", was held in Little Italy and originally was geared towards the city's Italian population. before moving to the Toronto Islands in 1968. By the mid-1970s, the picnic was attracting 125,000 attendants and 1,200 performers. The event moved to Exhibition Place in 1983 as attendance had become too large to be easily transported by the Toronto Island ferries. That year, its attendance of 200,000 over three days earned it an entry in the Guinness Book of World Records.

In 2015, the event returned to College Street for the centenary of Johnny Lombardi's birth and remained there in 2016, where it was held on Father's Day weekend in conjunction with the College Street Taste of Little Italy festival, for the event's 50th anniversary.

The picnic has been controversial at times as, until 2015, it included the annual CHIN bikini contest which began as a separate event held on Captain John's Harbour Boat Restaurant in 1976 and 1977 before becoming part of the picnic in 1978. In response to allegations of sexism, the picnic later launched an annual Mr. CHIN Bikini contest for men. The bikini contests were cancelled in 2016 as "times have changed" and so it would not "distract" from the rest of the festival and its message of cultural diversity.
