= Basil Hall (Canadian politician) =

2nd Mayor of North York
- In office 1 January 1970 – 31 December 1972
- Preceded by: James Service
- Succeeded by: Mel Lastman

Personal details
- Born: 1912 Toronto, Ontario, Canada
- Died: 25 May 1990 (aged 78) Toronto, Ontario
- Party: Independent (Municipal)
- Other political affiliations: Progressive Conservative Party of Ontario
- Spouse: Rita
- Children: 5

Basil Hall (1912 — April 26, 1990) was the second mayor of North York, Ontario, from 1970 to 1972. He was also a founding governor of both Seneca College and North York General Hospital. Prior to becoming mayor, he was a member of North York's town council since the mid-1950s. During his successful campaign for mayor in the December 1969 municipal election, he campaigned for a domed stadium to be built in Metropolitan Toronto.

Hall was born in Toronto in 1912, and studied architecture at the University of Toronto before joining his father's construction business in 1934. In 1946, he switched careers to become a chinchilla rancher. In 1952, he switched careers again entering the photography business and forming a photographic supply and microfilming company. This business was so successful that he was able to turn it over to his sons in 1954 in order to enter politics.

Hall lost his first attempt to win election to North York Town Council in the 1954 municipal election, but won a seat the following year. As an alderman and then a member of the Board of Control, he was the chairman of council's development committee for much of his term on council, prior to becoming mayor, and helped guide the municipality from being an "open fields" township to a semi-urban area and is credited with leading the development of Flemingdon Park, and along with then-mayor James Service, the introduction of high rise development in Willowdale around Yonge Street, which would eventually become North York's downtown.

In 1966, while a town councillor, he joined the founding board of governors of Seneca College, as the newly created community college was seeking to construct its first campus. He played a critical role in acquiring land on which Seneca would build its campus as well as property for the construction of North York General Hospital.

He was elected mayor in the December 1969 election defeating Liberal candidate Ronald Barbaro. Though a supporter of the Conservative Party, Hall ran as an independent and saw his election as a repudiation of party politics at the municipal level. Hall promised to only serve a single term as mayor and that he would bring in "business-like procedures" to North York's government.

Despite his support for the provincial Progressive Conservatives, Hall, who had championed the construction of the Spadina Expressway throughout his mayoralty, clashed with Ontario Premier Bill Davis after the provincial government bowed to pressure from downtown Toronto residents and cancelled the completion of the expressway in 1971. Hall successfully fought to have Metropolitan Toronto Council approve the paving of the Spadina Expressway right of way between Lawrence Avenue and Eglinton Avenue thus extending what became Allen Road further south.

After one term as mayor, Hall did not run for re-election in 1972 and instead endorsed Mel Lastman who went on to serve as mayor of North York, and then the amalgamated city of Toronto, into the twenty-first century.

Hall was appointed to the board of the Urban Transportation Development Corporation, a provincial crown corporation, in the 1970s.

He died of cancer at the age of 78 at Toronto's Grace Hospital.
