= CHIN (AM) =

Multilingual radio station in Toronto

Coordinates: 43°38′33.00″N 79°23′13.92″W

- Toronto, Ontario; Canada
- Broadcast area: Greater Toronto
- Frequency: 1540 kHz
- Branding: CHIN Radio

Programming
- Format: Multilingual

Ownership
- Owner: CHIN Radio/TV International; (Radio 1540 Limited)
- Sister stations: CHIN-FM 100.7, CHIN-1-FM 91.9

History
- First air date: June 6, 1966
- Call sign meaning: Canada Happiness International and also the Italian drinking toast cin cin.

Technical information
- Licensing authority: CRTC
- Class: B
- Power: 50,000 watts (day); 30,000 watts (night)
- Repeater: 100.7 CHIN-HD2 (Toronto)

Links
- Webcast: Listen live
- Website: www.chinradio.com/schedule-page-1540

CHIN (1540 kHz) is a commercial AM radio station in Toronto, Ontario, Canada. It is owned by CHIN Radio/TV International, and broadcasts a multilingual radio format. It formerly utilized an FM rebroadcaster at 91.9 MHz, CHIN-1-FM, originally used to fill in reception gaps in parts of Greater Toronto; CHIN-1-FM now broadcasts a separate schedule of ethnic programming, no longer simulcasting CHIN . In addition, there is a full-power FM station on 100.7 MHz, CHIN-FM, which offers a third ethnic programme schedule. CHIN, CHIN-1-FM and CHIN-FM have their radio studios on College Street in the Palmerston-Little Italy neighbourhood of Toronto.

By day, CHIN broadcasts at 50,000 watts, the maximum power for Canadian AM stations. Because 1540 AM is a clear-channel frequency reserved for the U.S. and Bahamas, CHIN reduces power at night to 30,000 watts to avoid interference. It uses a directional antenna with a four-tower array. The AM transmitter site is on Lakeshore Avenue on the Toronto Islands. The transmitter for CHIN-1-FM is atop an apartment tower complex near Bathurst and Sheppard in Toronto's Clanton Park neighbourhood.

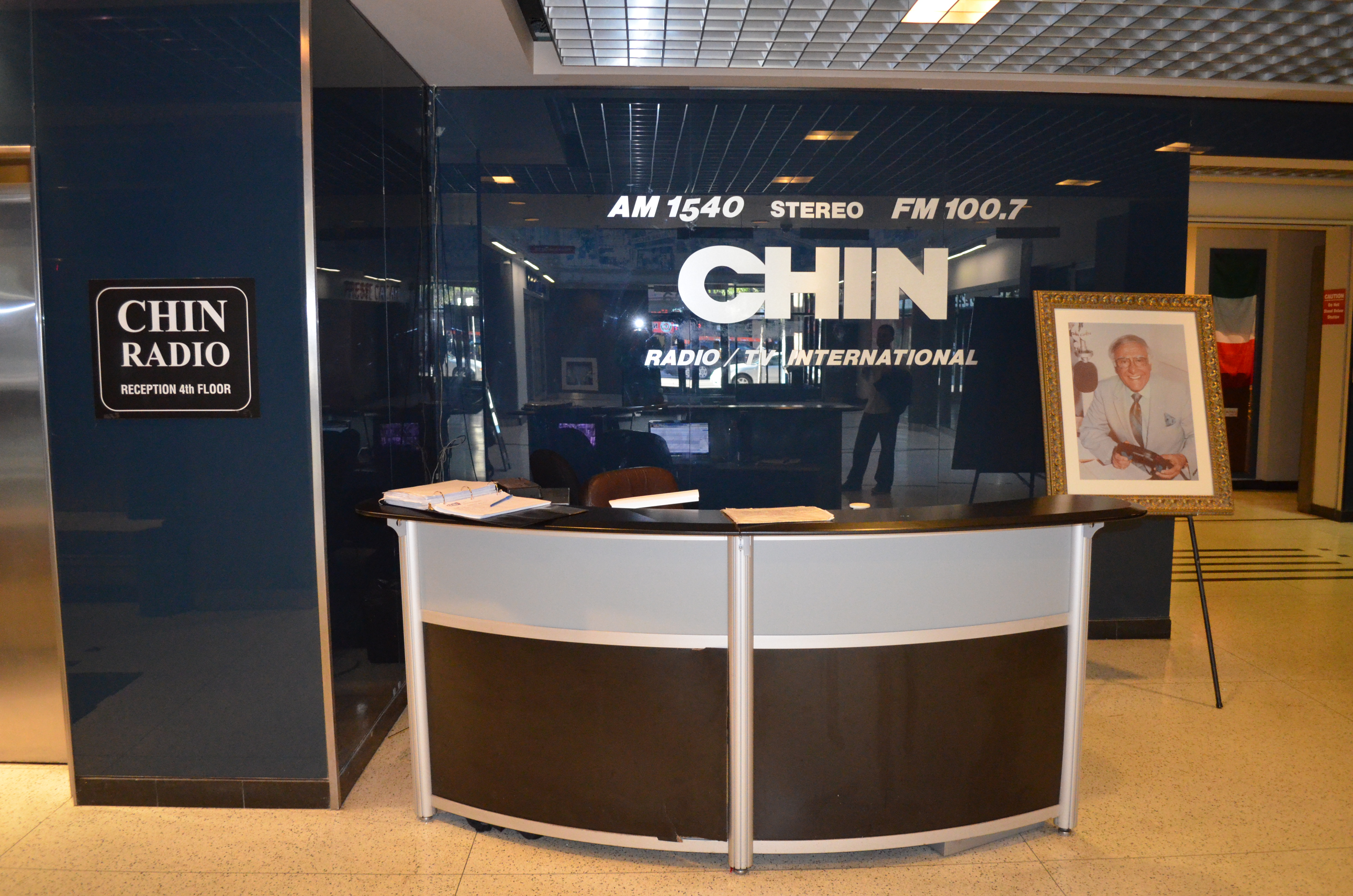
Entrance hall

== History ==
=== Early years ===
CHIN is one of Canada's first multilingual broadcast outlets along with Montreal's CFMB. Toronto broadcaster Johnny Lombardi and lawyer and North York mayor James Ditson Service signed on the station in 1966. The 1540 AM frequency had originally been used by CHFI-FM to simulcast on the AM band, but owner Ted Rogers was dissatisfied with the frequency. At the time, it was only licensed as a daytimer, required to sign off at sunset to protect U.S. and Bahamian clear-channel stations that also broadcast on the frequency. Lombardi and Service bought Radio 1540 Limited from Rogers in 1965.

They used the frequency to launch CHIN the next year, while Rogers shifted CHFI-AM to 680 kHz, where it became CFTR. In 1967, CHIN launched a sister station, 100.7 CHIN-FM. Both stations are licensed by the Canadian Radio-television and Telecommunications Commission (CRTC) to carry a schedule of programs in numerous languages aimed at Toronto's many ethnic groups.

Bruno Gerussi became the station's morning host in January 1967, replacing Al Boliska. He hosted a popular morning show, Gerussi, Words and Music starting in 1967, which later moved to CBC Radio where it was called Gerussi!. The show became popular, however, and in the fall of 1967, CBC Radio gave him a national daily morning show, Gerussi!, and became the model for the network's This Country in the Morning and Morningside in the 1970s.

=== Loss and recovery of licence ===
Lombardi was summoned to appear before the CRTC in 1970, after a Serbian-language programme aired on CHIN, calling for the assassination of Yugoslavia's consul in Toronto. Due to this incident, and other issues, the CRTC refused to renew CHIN's licence and ordered the station off the air by the end of the year. Lombardi was also in conflict with Service and another minority shareholder, James Longo, who had appealed for the licence to be transferred from Lombardi to themselves.

Subsequently, Lombardi bought out Service's share of the company (Longo was not recognized as a shareholder by the CRTC). Lombardi was able to regain the licence after a new hearing in which Service, Foster Hewitt, owner of CKFH where Lombardi had hosted a show prior to launching CHIN, and former CBC broadcaster John Fisher failed to convince the CRTC to award the licence to one of them over Lombardi.

=== 24-hour broadcasting ===
CHIN had attempted to broadcast at night by securing a second frequency at 1600 AM, but its application was denied by the CRTC in 1973. CHIN was able to make an agreement with the owners of clear-channel Class A KXEL in Waterloo, Iowa, which also broadcasts on 1540. With that pact, the CRTC authorized CHIN to broadcast 24 hours a day from a new transmitter with a directional pattern that better protects KXEL from interference.

The next year, CHIN acquired a competitor when Brampton station CKMW (now 530 CHLO), switched to a multilingual format after being acquired from former CHIN sales representative Bill Evanov. Additional ethnic stations are now found on AM 530, 1320, 1430, 1610, 1650, and 1690, all serving the growing immigrant communities in Greater Toronto.

=== FM rebroadcaster ===
With so many large buildings in and around Toronto, CHIN 1540 was experiencing reception problems in some neighborhoods. To help listeners having trouble with the AM signal, the station set up an FM rebroadcaster in 1997, at 101.3 FM with the call sign CHIN-1-FM. On April 17, 2003, Radio 1540 Ltd. was given approval to change the frequency of CHIN-1-FM to 91.9 MHz and to increase the effective radiated power from 22 to 35 watts.

On November 28, 2016, Radio 1540 Limited applied to operate a separate originating FM station under CHIN-1-FM's current technical parameters, specifically, at frequency 91.9 MHz with an average effective radiated power (ERP) of 1,850 watts (maximum ERP of 5,000 watts with an effective height of antenna above average terrain of 86 metres). The CRTC approved Radio 1540 Ltd. application on May 5, 2017.

On January 14, 2011, CHIN received approval to increase the effective radiated power for the CHIN-FM-1 transmitter from 161 to 1,850 watts (maximum ERP from 350 to 5,000 watts with an antenna height above average terrain of 86 metres).

Former logo

In 2016, CHIN submitted an application to allow them to broadcast original programming on CHIN-FM-1 rather than use it to rebroadcast CHIN-AM's programming. The CRTC approved this request in 2017.

== Programming ==
Until 2024, CHIN's lineup on 1540 AM consists primarily of Cantonese & Mandarin Chinese in the daytime and Brazilian Portuguese in the evening. It also aired Albanian, Bengali, Bosnian, Bulgarian, Croatian, Filipino, German, Hebrew, Irish, Italian, Russian, Somali, Ukrainian and Yoruba programming on Saturdays and Sundays.

In June 2024, CHIN AM's Chinese programming moved to its two FM sister stations and the AM station's schedule became almost entirely Italian, except on Sundays when from 8 am to 5 pm it airs Jewish, Irish/Scottish, Croatian, Bosnian, German, Filipino, Bengali, Yoruba, Portuguese, and Nepalese programming. On Sunday mornings the station aired a religious service from Timothy Eaton Memorial Church for many years.

CHIN-FM-1 carries mostly South Asian programming, with some shows aimed at Cantonese, Jewish, Malayalam and Spanish-speaking listeners.

On February 10, 2016, CHIN stopped carrying "China Radio International" in late night hours and replaced it with dance music-formatted programming originating from internet broadcaster "DJFM Toronto".

Sam Yuchtman was the first producer hired by CHIN in 1966, and hosted The Jewish Hour until he retired in 1976. His daughter, Zelda Young, took over the program and continued as host of the show, later called The Zelda Young Show, until her death in 2023. The Jewish program is now hosted by Martin Abeles and airs on CHIN-FM-1 91.9 on Sunday mornings for two hours and a daily hour-long show weekday mornings.

== Application for AM frequency change ==
On June 27, 2025, Radio 1540 Limited submitted an application to change CHIN's AM frequency from 1540 kHz to 900 kHz. The AM 900 kHz frequency was previously used by CHML in nearby Hamilton, Ontario until the station shutdown in 2024. On January 15, 2026, The CRTC approved an application to change CHIN’s AM frequency from 1540 kHz to 900 kHz, also allowing CHIN to simulcast programming on its original 1540 kHz frequency for up to 12 months.
