= Johnny Lombardi =

Canadian broadcaster

- Born: December 4, 1915; Toronto, Ontario, Canada
- Died: March 18, 2002 (aged 86); Toronto, Ontario, Canada
- Other name: Mr. Toronto
- Occupation: Radio broadcaster
- Known for: CHIN
- Spouse: Lena Lombardi
- Children: 3

Johnny Lombardi, CM OOnt (December 4, 1915 – March 18, 2002) was a pioneer of multicultural broadcasting in Canada. He founded CHIN in 1966 and CHIN-FM in 1967.

== Early life ==
The son of Italian immigrants, Lombardi was born in what is now Trinity Square, in The Ward neighbourhood in central Toronto, Ontario. His father Leonardo Barbalinardo changed his name to Leonardo Lombardi shortly after moving to Canada because the Anglo-Saxon community of Toronto at the time had difficulty pronouncing his name. Leonardo had come to Canada from Pisticci, in the region of Basilicata.

He was lead trumpet player for the Benny Palmer Orchestra in London, a popular Ontario big band during the 1930s. He enlisted in the Canadian Army during World War II in 1942, and was soon stationed in Europe, participating in the taking of Juno Beach. He was a Sergeant in the army, and during the war he entertained the troops with his trumpet.

== CHIN Radio ==
He returned to Canada in 1946, and in 1948 he opened a supermarket named Lombardi's Italian Foods Ltd., or simply Lombardi’s Supermarket, at 637 College Street, an area which came to be known as Little Italy. He began his broadcasting career as a producer for an hour-long Italian music program, first on CHUM and later on CKFH in which he advertised his supermarket. The show was successful and his store flourished. Lombardi became a promoter of concerts and sporting events. A champion of multiculturalism before it was implemented as Canadian government policy, he and James Service founded one of the first multilingual radio stations in Canada, CHIN in 1966 and CHIN-FM in 1967, which now serve over 30 ethnic communities. By 1968, CHIN was broadcasting in 32 languages, with Italian language programming predominant, at 60 hours per week. Lombardi bought Service out in 1970.

Another entrepreneur who did not forget the "ethnics" was Johnny Lombardi, who put his creature, CHIN Radio, at their disposal. Not only for Italians, but also Hispanics, Asians, people from the Middle East. All of them found newscasts, talk shows, educational programs in their respective languages.

— Antonio Maglio, 23 - Respect through much hard work, Tandem

Lombardi later hosted an Italian-language television program on CITY-TV. He was also known for hosting the annual CHIN Picnics at the Canadian National Exhibition, featuring bikini contests derided by many feminists.

He would later explain the choice of CHIN using a backronym:

He explained the meaning of that approach through the letters in CHIN: "C is for Canada, H for happiness, I and N for international. CHIN is the happiness of living in Canada in a multicultural, international environment."

— Antonio Maglio, 23 - Respect through much hard work, Tandem

Lombardi ran for a seat on Toronto City Council in the 1969 municipal election in Ward 4 which included Toronto's Little Italy but was defeated by less than 200 votes.

== Personal life ==
Lombardi was married to Lena, with whom he had one son, Leonard (also known as Lenny), and two daughters, Donina and Theresa. He was sometimes referred to as "Mr. Toronto", and usually wore a baseball cap.

== Death ==
He died in hospital on 18 March 2002 after a brief illness. A funeral mass was held at St. Francis of Assisi Church in Little Italy on 25 March, and was attended by over a thousand people, including Premier of Ontario Mike Harris.

The day after his death, York West representative Judy Sgro paid tribute to him in the House of Commons of Canada. Mel Lastman, then mayor of Toronto, stated that "Johnny invented multicultural radio in Toronto". On 20 March, Eglinton—Lawrence Member of Parliament Joe Volpe also paid tribute to Lombardi in the Commons, referring to him as "king of Little Italy" and the "father of multicultural broadcasting", also stating:

Johnny was an integral part of the transformation of urban society in post-war southern Ontario. His radio station, home to broadcasting in 30 different languages, gave voice to the marginalized and served to give newcomers a sense of comfort and familiarity in a new and often strange land. Those programs not only served to acclimatize and integrate people into the Canadian mainstream, but they also helped launch Canadian talent in music and the arts.

— Joe Volpe, 37th PARLIAMENT, 1st SESSION EDITED HANSARD, Parliament of Canada

He would complete his tribute with a statement spoken in Italian. On 26 March, Lombardi received tributes in the Canadian Senate from Frank Mahovlich and Consiglio Di Nino.

== Legacy ==
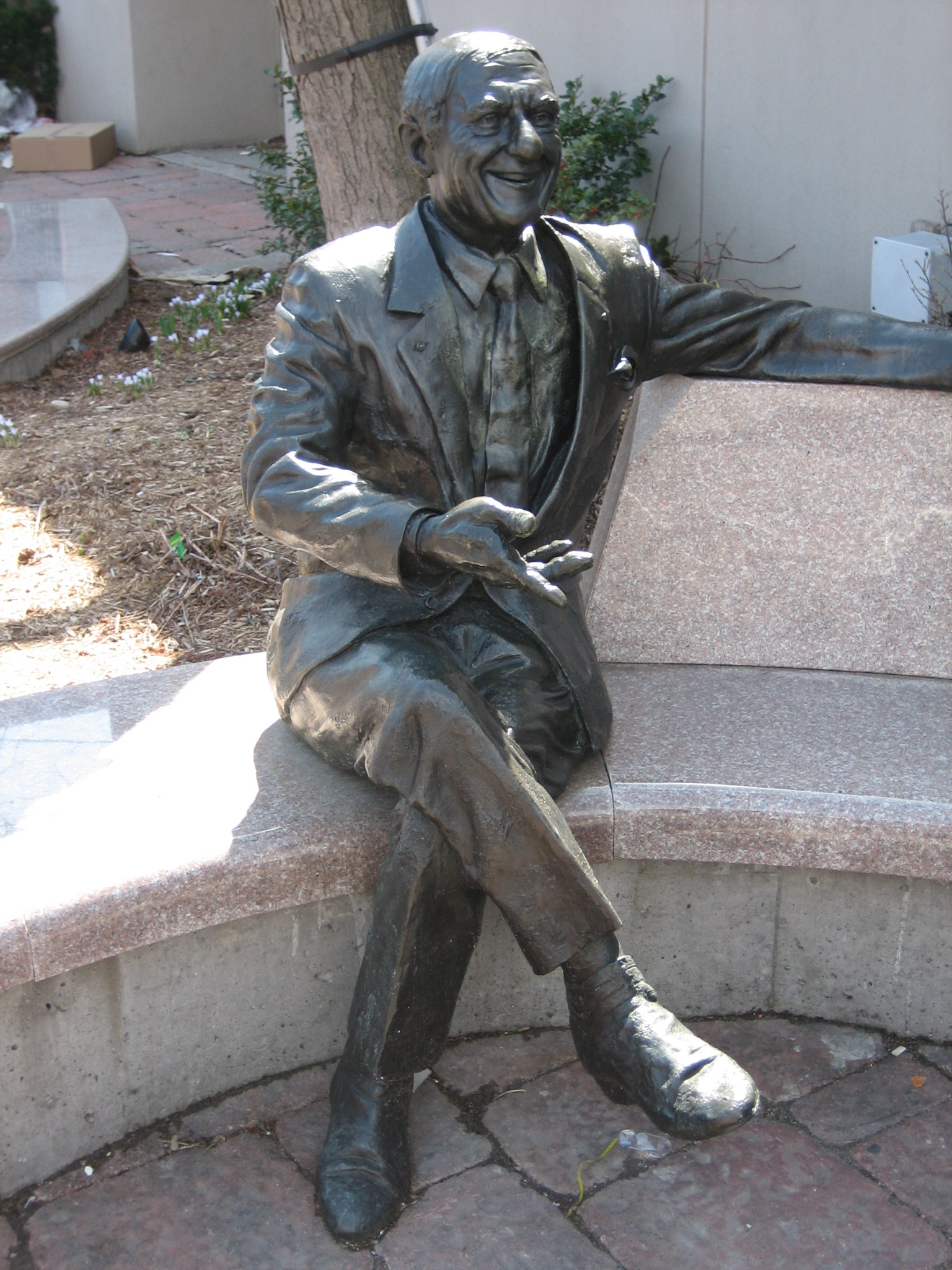
The Lombardi statue on College Street.

Lombardi was a recipient of the Order of Canada and was invited by Prime Minister Jean Chrétien to commemorate the 50th anniversary of the D-Day invasion of Normandy on June 6, 1994, in which he had originally participated.

Often referred to as the "mayor of Little Italy," Lombardi lived in the neighborhood all his life, and a memorial to him was installed at the southwest corner of College Street and Grace Street, in an area known as Piazza Johnny Lombardi in Little Italy. It is a bronze statue of Lombardi, seated on an arced granite bench, with a statue of a seated boy nearby. It was designed by Veronica and Edwin Dam de Nogales.

In Pisticci, a comune of the Basilicata region in southern Italy, a square was restored and renamed Piazza Johnny Lombardi (also known as Piazza Lombardi) in his honour. It will "function as the main focal point for all musical shows and exhibits in Pisticci", a tribute to Lombardi's trumpet playing. A ceremony held on 11 August 2007 in Pisticci, declared Johnny Lombardi Day, officially twinned the Piazza in Pisticci with Piazza Johnny Lombardi in Toronto.

Lombardi was also bestowed with the Cavaliere Ufficiale (Official Knight of the Italian Republic), awarded a Federal Citation of Citizenship, and won Broadcaster of the Year Award. The municipal government of the city of Toronto officially named a segment of College Street between Clinton Street and Grace Street as Johnny Lombardi Way in his honour. That area houses the CHIN Radio building, and was the location of Lombardi's grocery store.

His son Lenny and daughter Theresa, and daughter-in-law Grace, along with Joe Pantalone, established The Johnny Lombardi Multicultural Foundation on 21 May 2008. The hour-long documentary, produced by his son Lenny and his wife Grace Fusillo-Lombardi, Johnny Lombardi: The Great Communicator about his life contains interview clips from many well-known Canadians, including Jean Chrétien and Ted Rogers.

Lombardi was one of six original inductees into the Italian Walk of Fame in Toronto, honouring Italians or descendants of emigrant Italians "who have demonstrated an exceptional level of accomplishment within their respective fields". The others were Rudolph Bratty, Phil Esposito, Julian Fantino, Connie Francis and Giancarlo Giannini.

The Ethnic Broadcasting Award in honour of Johnny Lombardi at Toronto Metropolitan University awards CA$1,000 to a student in the School of Radio and Television Arts program at the university "who demonstrates a special proficiency in ethnic broadcasting".

In Portrait of the Street: The Soul and Spirit of College, a documentary by Sandra Danilovic of the history of College Street and the surrounding area, Lombardi recounts an anecdote from his youth. He had walked for more than an hour to a pool in Mimico with friends, only to be turned away:

The man at the gate pointed to the sign, "Gentiles Only". Lombardi turned to the man and asked, "What does that mean?" He tells him no Jews, Lombardi says, "but I'm not Jewish, I'm Italian." "That's worse," said the man at the gate, and Lombardi spent the long walk home in tears.

— Paul Townend, Portrait of the Street: The Soul and Spirit of College. - Review, Take One

Lombardi was memorialized in a Heritage Minute, discussing his service at Juno Beach and subsequent impact on Canadian culture.

His son Lenny and daughter Theresa remain dedicated to continuing the legacy their father left. Lenny is president and CEO of CHIN Radio/TV International. Theresa is the vice president and general manager.

=== Archives ===
There is a Johnny Lombardi fonds at Library and Archives Canada. The archival reference number is R5389.
