= Integral House =

Private residence in Toronto, Canada

Coordinates: 43.6846°N 79.369°W

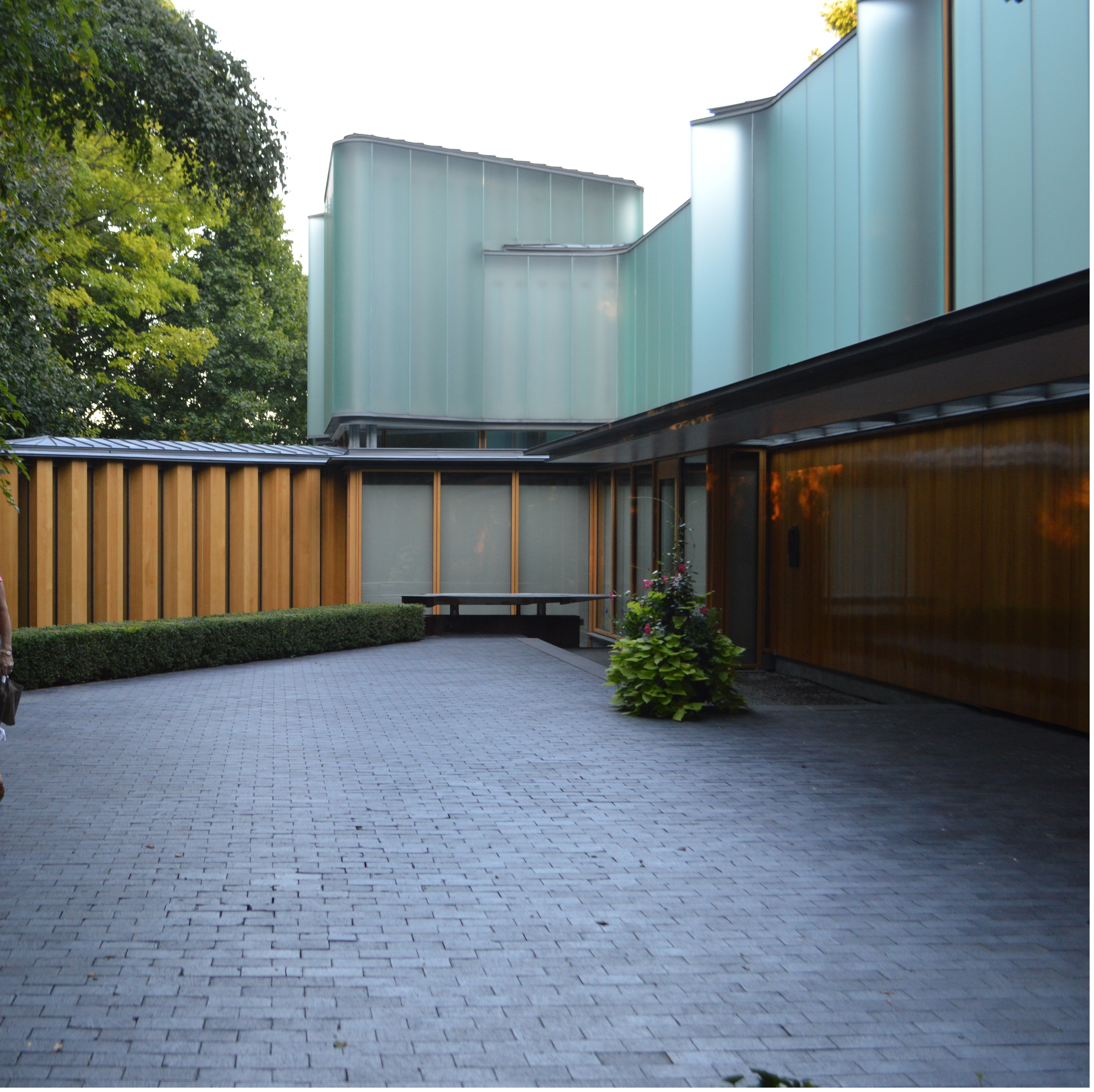
Integral House in 2016

Integral House is a private residence located at 194 Roxborough Drive in the Rosedale neighbourhood of Toronto, Ontario, Canada. The project was commissioned by mathematician James Stewart as a residence incorporating a performance space, and was designed by Brigitte Shim and Howard Sutcliffe of the Toronto architectural firm Shim-Sutcliffe Architects. The name of the house is derived from the mathematical integral symbol, commonly used in calculus; Stewart's wealth derived from his authorship of widely used calculus textbooks. It has won several architectural awards, including a 2012 Governor-General's Medal in Architecture. Glenn D. Lowry, director of the Museum of Modern Art, said of Integral House, "I think it's one of the most important private houses built in North America in a long time."

The house went on sale in the autumn of 2015 after Stewart's passing in December 2014. It was sold in 2016 by Sotheby's. At that time it had been speculated that the buyers were musicians Chantal Kreviazuk and Raine Maida, although when the house was re-listed for sale in 2019, it was reported that the buyer had been Mark Machin, a British banker and then-president of the CPP Investment Board who has purchased the property for C$15 million in 2016 and lived there with his wife and children. The house was sold in 2020 for a slightly-higher C$18.5 million.

== Commissioning of the design and building process ==
In the late 1990s, James Stewart first conceived of creating a house whose design included both curves and a large and flexible performing space. After drawing up a list of architects he admired, he granted the commission to Brigitte Shim and Howard Sutcliffe of Shim-Sutcliffe Architects in 1999, and they began work on the design. In 2002, Stewart purchased the property where Integral House now stands, and then demolished the original house. Design work continued, and building began in 2003, with the project being completed in 2009. Even before the construction was complete, Architectural Digest magazine included the house in its annual Toronto tour. The final cost of the house was estimated at $24 million.

== Architecture ==
Integral House is a 1,700-square-metre (18,000-square-foot) house built into a hillside. The three lower stories are built into the ravine, below street level; only the two uppermost stories are visible from the street. The rear exterior is glass and oak. The design incorporates environmentally friendly features, including geothermal heating and cooling and planted roofs.

The lowest level is a pool area with an outdoor patio separated from the house by a 7-metre (24-foot) wall of glass that can be lowered into the floor at the press of a button. The study, located on the second level, overlooks the ravine, with a view of the roof garden over the level below. The large performance space is located on the third level. The second floor, which is at street level, includes the kitchen as well as dining and living room areas that overlook the performance space below and are used as balconies during performances. The upper level contains the master bedroom, as well as guest bedrooms and a guest suite.

== As a performance space ==
In addition to the private performances that Stewart has hosted, he also made the performance space available to selected arts and cultural groups for fundraising events. While Stewart was resident in the house, he hosted about a dozen events a year. The first fundraising event was for the Mark S. Bonham Centre for Sexual Diversity Studies, part of the University of Toronto.

== In popular culture ==
Integral House was used as a filming location in several episodes of the second season of Star Trek: Discovery, appearing as the home of Vulcan ambassador Sarek and his family.

Kreviazuk's music video for Into Me was filmed in the house and released in January 2016.

== Awards ==
- American Institute of Architects: Honor Award, Interior Architecture, 2012.
- Governor-General's Medal In Architecture, 2012.
- Mies Crown Hall Americas Prize, Illinois Institute of Technology. Shortlisted, 2014.
- Architectural Woodwork Award (First place), 2009.
