= Wong Dai Sin Temple =

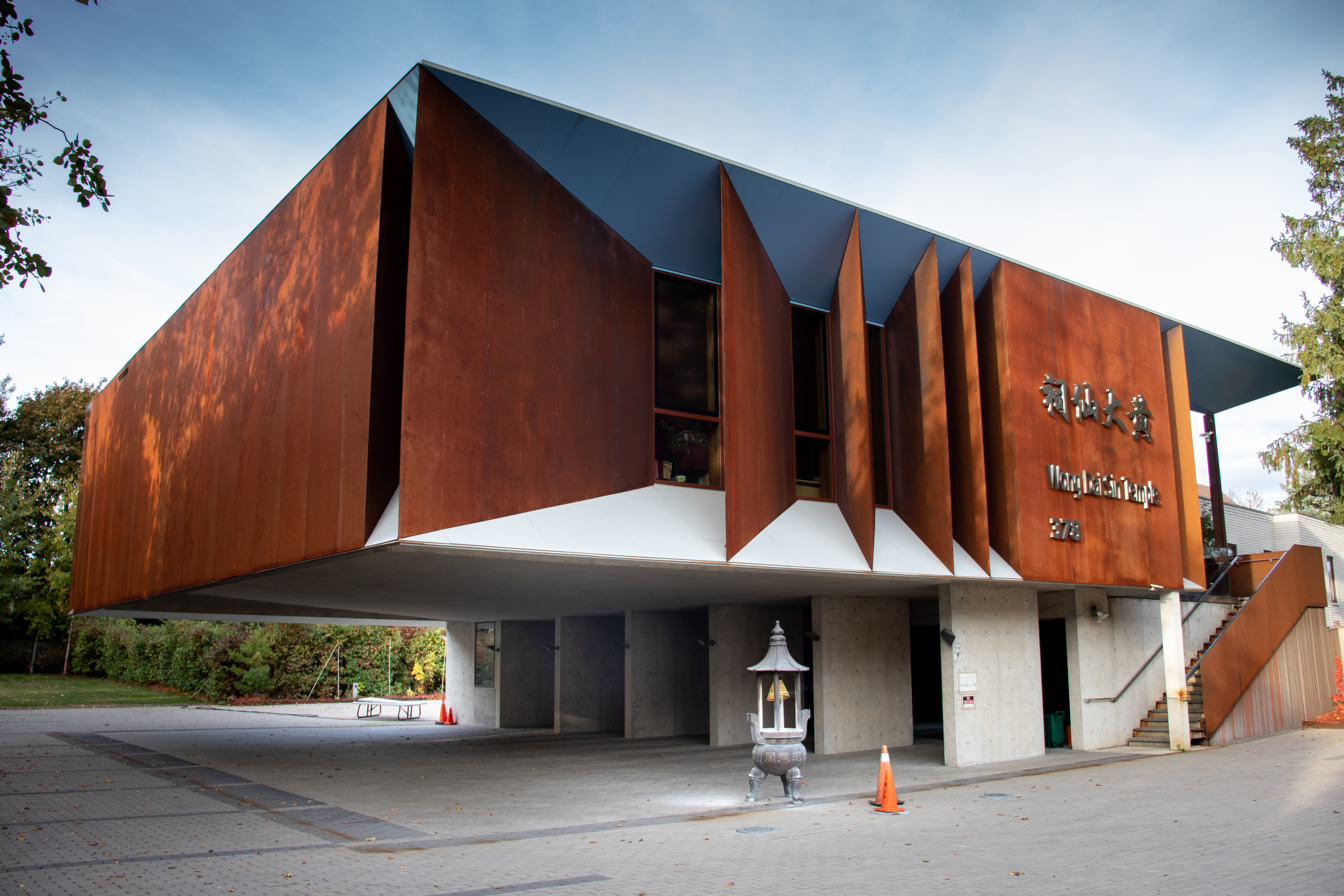
- View from Steeles Ave E, North York, ON in 2021
- Interactive map of the Wong Dai Sin Temple area

General information
- Architectural style: Modern architecture
- Location: 378 Steeles Ave E, Thornhill, ON L3T 0E7 1, Markham, ON, Canada
- Coordinates: 43°48′20″N 79°23′11″E

Technical details
- Floor area: 3271 ft²

Design and construction
- Architect: Brigitte Shim

The Wong Dai Sin Temple is a Taoist temple located in Markham, Ontario, Canada. It was designed by Shim-Sutcliffe Architects and completed in 2015 to provide a new home for The Fung Loy Kok Institute of Taoism, a group dedicated to their inner spiritual growth via the ancient physical practice of tai chi. The temple was specifically designed to meet the spiritual needs and unique practices of The Fung Loy Kok Taoist Tai Chi Society while also reflecting the modern and contemporary world of its members.

The Fung Loy Kok Taoist Tai Chi Society's practices are based in Taoism, and are represented in the temple's architecture. Similar to a well-executed tai chi position, the building's asymmetry and balance symbolize the harmony and balance of the universe according to Taoism and the balance of energy (chi and yin yang). The temple's daring floating one-story structure is one of the boldest gestures of architecture in the area, and rises above the ground on a small number of rectangular columns that are suspended several meter's above the ground. It is supported by one of the longest pre-stressed concrete cantilevers in North America.

The Canadian Architect (2016) lauded the elegance and refinement of the temple's design and layout, among other publications. According to Hume (2015), the temple is also raising the bar for Markham's architecture. Several awards, including the Governor General's Awards in Architecture, a prestigious award in Canada that recognizes remarkable performance in the field of architecture[9], have been given in recognition of the buildings daring and impressive architectural achievements. Azure Magazine (2016) also recognizes Wong Dai Sin Temple as the 2016 AZ Awards Winner for Outstanding Architecture Under 1000 Square Meters, the RAIC (2016) exhibits the work of Governor General's Medal winners.

== History ==
The Wong Dai Sin Temple was constructed to benefit the people of Markham, Ontario, and to offer a place of worship for devotees of the Chinese god Wong Tai Sin. The Fung Loy Kok Institute of Taoism's religious principles and the contemporary lifestyle of its followers are reflected in the modern design and ancient practices of tai chi and worship at the temple. The temples proposition was strongly opposed by protests from nearby residents and Markham officials, which meant taking the buildings proposal to the Ontario Municipal Board to get it approved. With its intentional use of colour, amplification of natural light, and dedication to a carefully selected palette of materials, the temple is a modern rendition of the old Wong Tai Sin Temples seen in other regions of the world.

== Usage ==
For devotees of the Chinese god Wong Tai Sin, the Wong Dai Sin Temple is a holy location where rituals, meditation, and other spiritual activities are performed. One such spiritual activity is tai chi, which doubly serves as meditative and exercise to increase mobility and strength in the predominantly senior user base of the temple.

The temple grounds serves as both a parking lot and a covered outdoor area for neighborhood events and tai chi practice. Along with Taoism the temple also serves the practice and learning of Buddhism and Confucianism. A memorial room remembering ancestors is located in the temple's prayer hall. It has bamboo plaques and places for worshippers to lay offerings and ignite incense. Large rings of incense are supported by circular motorized skylights and red light monitors, which adjust natural light and are employed in Taoist chanting and prayer rituals.

== Design ==
Using cast-in-place concrete, the Wong Dai Sin Temple is able to accomplish difficult angular geometries without the use of extra cladding or framework. The asymmetry and balancing of the structure resemble a controlled tai chi position. The primary and minor cantilevers, which are supported on thin concrete piers and exhibit asymmetry and counterbalance while preserving equilibrium, are visible on the south elevation. The floating structure of the temple also allows it to free up more space for activities at the temple such as tai chi, and adding additional parking space. The building's north and south facades are covered with vertical fins made of curved weathering steel that regulate views from the inside out. These panels angle according to the suns path to keep the inside of the temple at a constant dim and diffused lighting condition, creating a calm place for worship and ritual. Additional lighting is created through the use of skylights that double as light fixtures. The angular and simple shape language of the Wong Dai Sin Temple, in tandem with its massive concrete and steel exterior have principles rooted in the architectural style of modernism, which gives the temple a contemporary edge to match its setting.

== Awards ==
The Wong Dai Sin Temple's design earned recognition through The Governor General's Medals in Architecture, a prestigious award in Canada that recognizes excellence in architecture. This award is considered an influential force in shaping the built environment in Canada and raising the profile of Canadian architecture both nationally and internationally. Azure Magazine (2016) recognizes Wong Dai Sin Temple as the 2016 AZ Awards Winner for Outstanding Architecture Under 1000 Square Meters as well.
