= Mark Wiseman =

Canadian businessman and diplomat (born 1970)

His Excellency Mark Wiseman
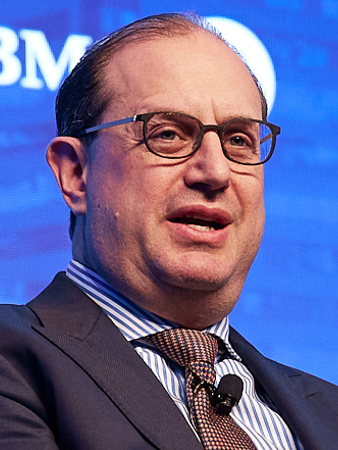

Canadian Ambassador to the United States
- Incumbent
- Assumed office February 15, 2026
- Prime Minister: Mark Carney
- Preceded by: Kirsten Hillman

Personal details
- Born: 1970 (age 55–56) Niagara Falls, Ontario, Canada
- Children: 2
- Education: Queen's University (BA); University of Toronto (MBA, LLB); Yale University (LLM)
- Website: www.international.gc.ca

Mark David Wiseman (born 1970) is a Canadian lawyer, businessman and diplomat who has served as the ambassador of Canada to the United States since February 2026.

Wiseman previously served as the chair of the Alberta Investment Management Corporation from 2020 to 2023 and president and CEO of the Canada Pension Plan Investment Board from 2012 to 2016. He held senior roles at BlackRock and worked as an advisor to Boston Consulting Group and Lazard prior to assuming his role as ambassador. Wiseman co-founded the Century Initiative.

== Early life and education ==
Wiseman was born in Niagara Falls, Ontario, and raised in Burlington by his mother, a physiotherapist, and his father, a plumber and pipe fitter who headed a division of a construction company. He has one sister, who is a veterinarian. He earned a bachelor's degree from Queen's University as well as a law degree and an MBA from the University of Toronto. He obtained a Master of Laws degree from Yale University, where he was a Fulbright Scholar. He is Jewish.

== Legal and business career ==
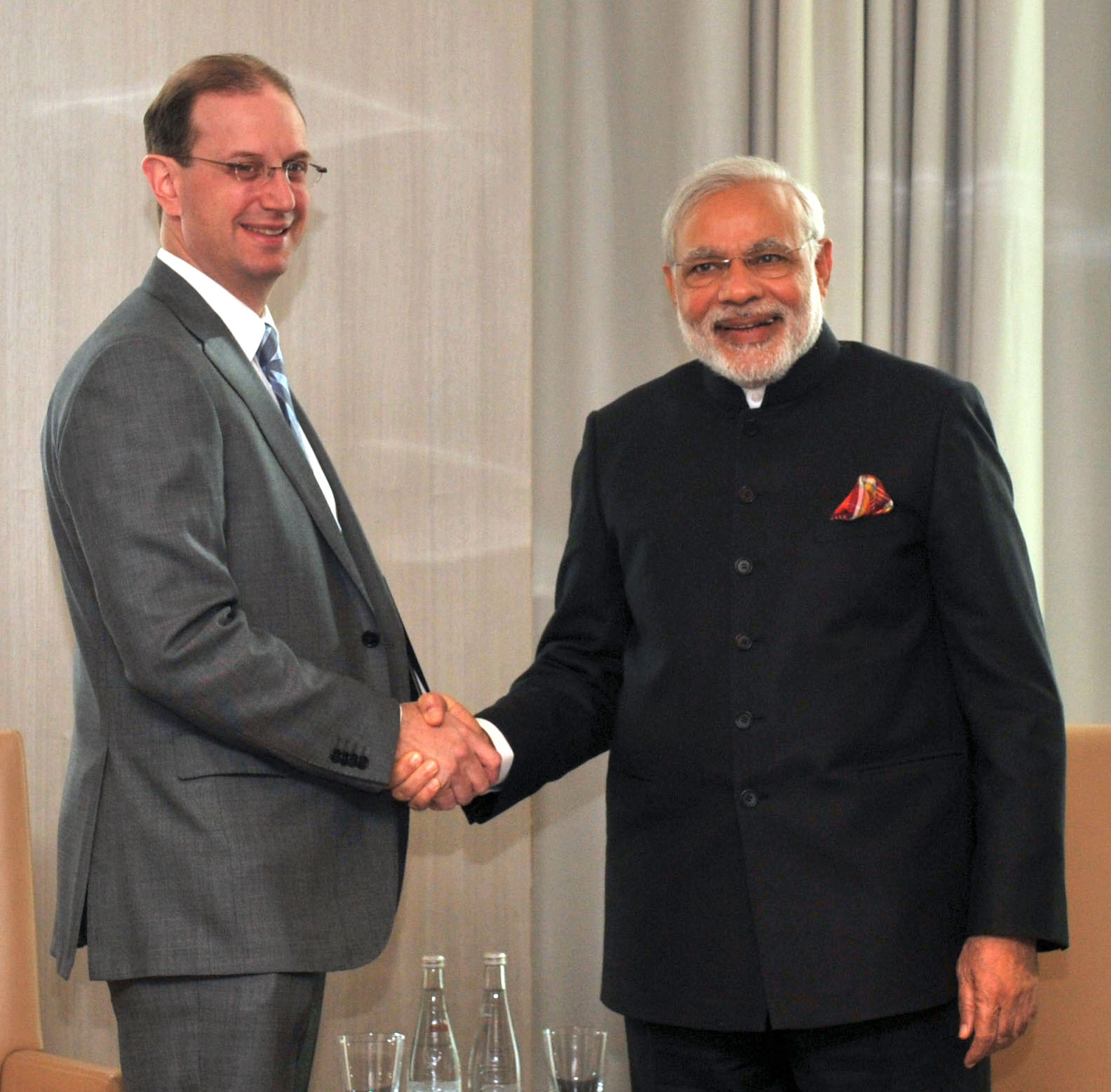
Wiseman with Indian Prime Minister Narendra Modi in 2015

Early in his career, Wiseman was an officer with Harrowston, a publicly traded Canadian merchant bank and a lawyer with Sullivan & Cromwell, practising in New York and Paris. He also was a law clerk to Justice Beverley McLachlin at the Supreme Court of Canada. Wiseman was responsible for the private equity fund and co-investment program at the Ontario Teachers' Pension Plan. Wiseman then joined the Canadian Pension Plan Investment Board (CPPIB) as a Senior VP in 2005. Wiseman became the president and CEO of CPPIB in 2012.

In 2014, Wiseman co-founded the Century Initiative with Dominic Barton. It is a lobbying group focused on increasing Canada's population to 100 million by 2100.

In 2016, as a member of Minister of Finance Bill Morneau's Advisory Council on Economic Growth, both Wiseman and Dominic Barton advocated for increasing immigration targets to 450,000 a year, with a focus on top business talent and international students, in order to "raise the living standards for all Canadians." Wiseman and the council argued that without significant immigration changes Canada would fall outside the top 45 nations in population by 2100 and would become "increasingly irrelevant over time." In 2016, Canada was ranked 38th by population, lower than countries such as Thailand, Mexico, and Uganda.

From 2016 to 2019, Wiseman was a Senior Managing Director at BlackRock, Global Head of Active Equities, Chairman of its alternatives business, and Chairman of BlackRock's Global Investment Committee. He was also on BlackRock's Global Executive Committee. On December 5, 2019, Wiseman was fired from his position at BlackRock following a failure to report a consensual relationship with a subordinate employee under his reporting line. in violation of the company's relationship at work policy. Wiseman stated in an internal memo "I engaged in a consensual relationship with one of our colleagues without reporting it. I regret my mistake and I accept responsibility for my actions."

Wiseman advised various businesses, most recently joining Lazard as a part-time senior advisor. He is also a senior advisor to Boston Consulting Group and Hillhouse Capital.

Wiseman is the co-founder and former chairman of FCLTGlobal (formerly Focusing Capital on the Long Term), an organization that encourages longer-term approaches in business and investing, which was set up by BlackRock, CPPIB, Dow, McKinsey & Company and Tata in 2016.

In June 2020, Wiseman was named the new chair of the Alberta Investment Management Corporation. In a BNN Bloomberg interview, Wiseman advocated for immigration levels to be increased to 500,000 in order to rehabilitate Canada after the COVID-19 pandemic. "One of the things we do very well in this country, is bring and integrate new people," he claimed. He stepped down from AIMCo in 2023. During his time there, Wiseman donated his salary to the United Way of Alberta.

== Diplomatic career ==
In March 2025, Prime Minister Mark Carney appointed Wiseman to the council of advisors on Canada-U.S. relations, established in January by Justin Trudeau. On December 22, 2025, Carney announced Wiseman would succeed Kirsten Hillman as the Canadian ambassador to the United States in February 2026.

== Personal life ==
Previously, Wiseman was in a common-law relationship with Marcia Moffat, whom he met on his first day at University of Toronto. The country head of Canada for BlackRock, Moffat joined the firm a year before Wiseman. They have two sons.

Business positions
| Preceded by David F. Denison | CEO of CPP Investment Board; June 30, 2012-June 2016 | Succeeded by Mark Machin |
