= John A. MacNaughton =

- Born: 6 March 1945; Exeter, Ontario
- Died: 15 February 2013 (aged 67); Toronto, Ontario
- Education: University of Western Ontario (BA 1967)
- Spouse: Gail McKinnon (m. 1973)

John Alan MacNaughton CM (6 March 1945 – 15 February 2013) was a Canadian investment dealer. He was the chairman of the Business Development Bank of Canada and was the founding president and CEO of the Canada Pension Plan Investment Board.

== Biography ==
MacNaughton was born in Exeter, Ontario to Charles Steel MacNaughton (1911–1987) and Adeline Myrtle Willard Fulcher (1913–1997).

He left to study at the University of Western Ontario. MacNaughton was the chairman of the Business Development Bank of Canada and of the CNSX stock exchange. He was a director of Nortel Networks Corporation and Nortel Networks Limited. He was the chair of the Independent Nominating Committee of the new Canada Employment Insurance Financing Board.

He served as president and CEO of Burns Fry from 1989 to 1994 and president of Nesbitt Burns from 1994 to 1999. MacNaughton was also a director for TransCanada Corp.

He was the founding president and CEO of the Canada Pension Plan Investment Board from 1999 to 2005.

He was also a member of the Trilateral Commission

In 2004, he was made a Member of the Order of Canada for his "outstanding leadership in the financial services industry as well as in the voluntary and public sectors".

== Death ==
MacNaughton died on February 15, 2013, at the age of 67 after a lengthy battle with cancer.

Business positions
Preceded by (none)	CEO of CPP Investment Board; 1999—2005	Succeeded by David F Denison
