= Green building and wood =

Helsinki Central Library Oodi's use of wood on its exterior
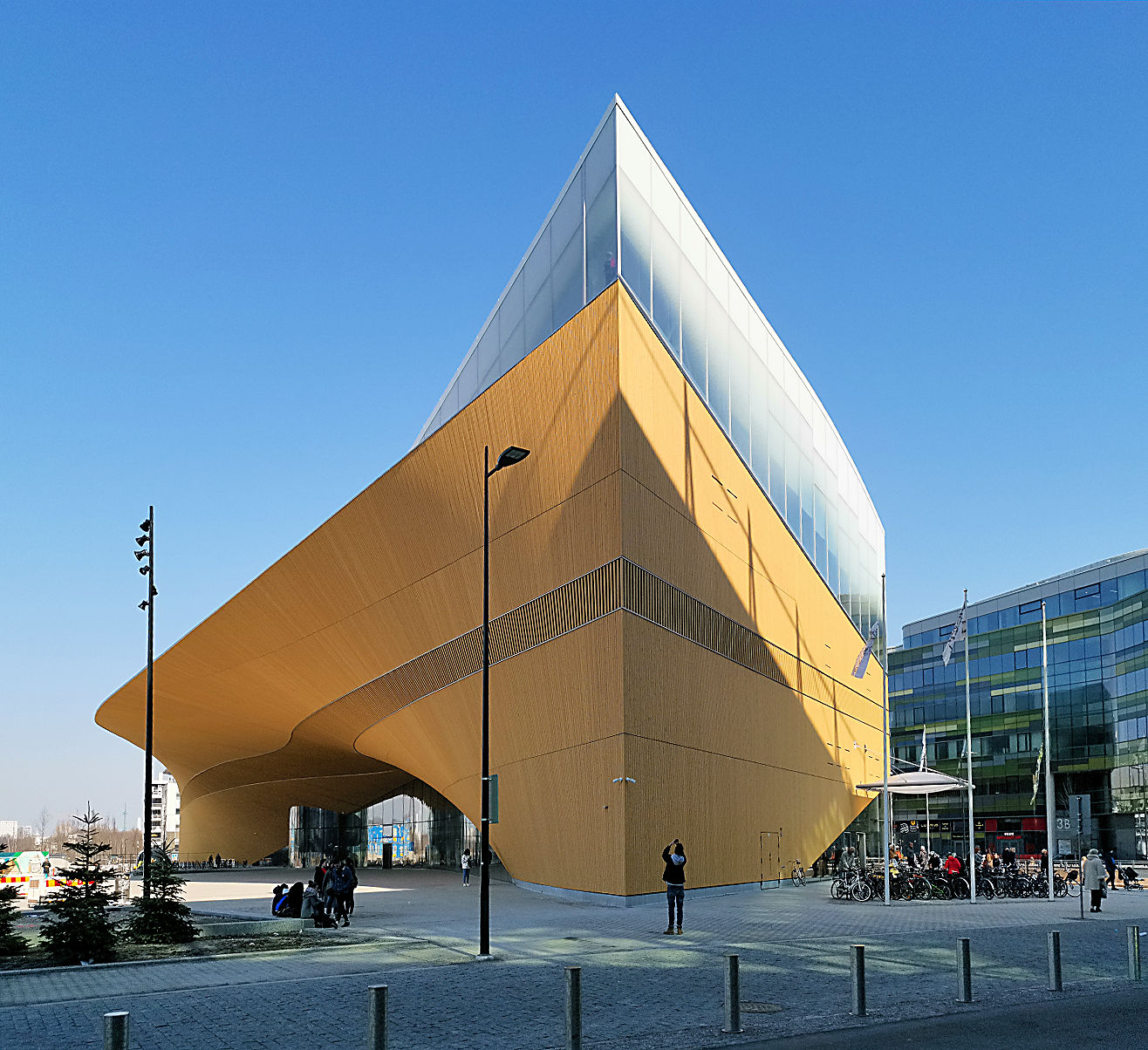
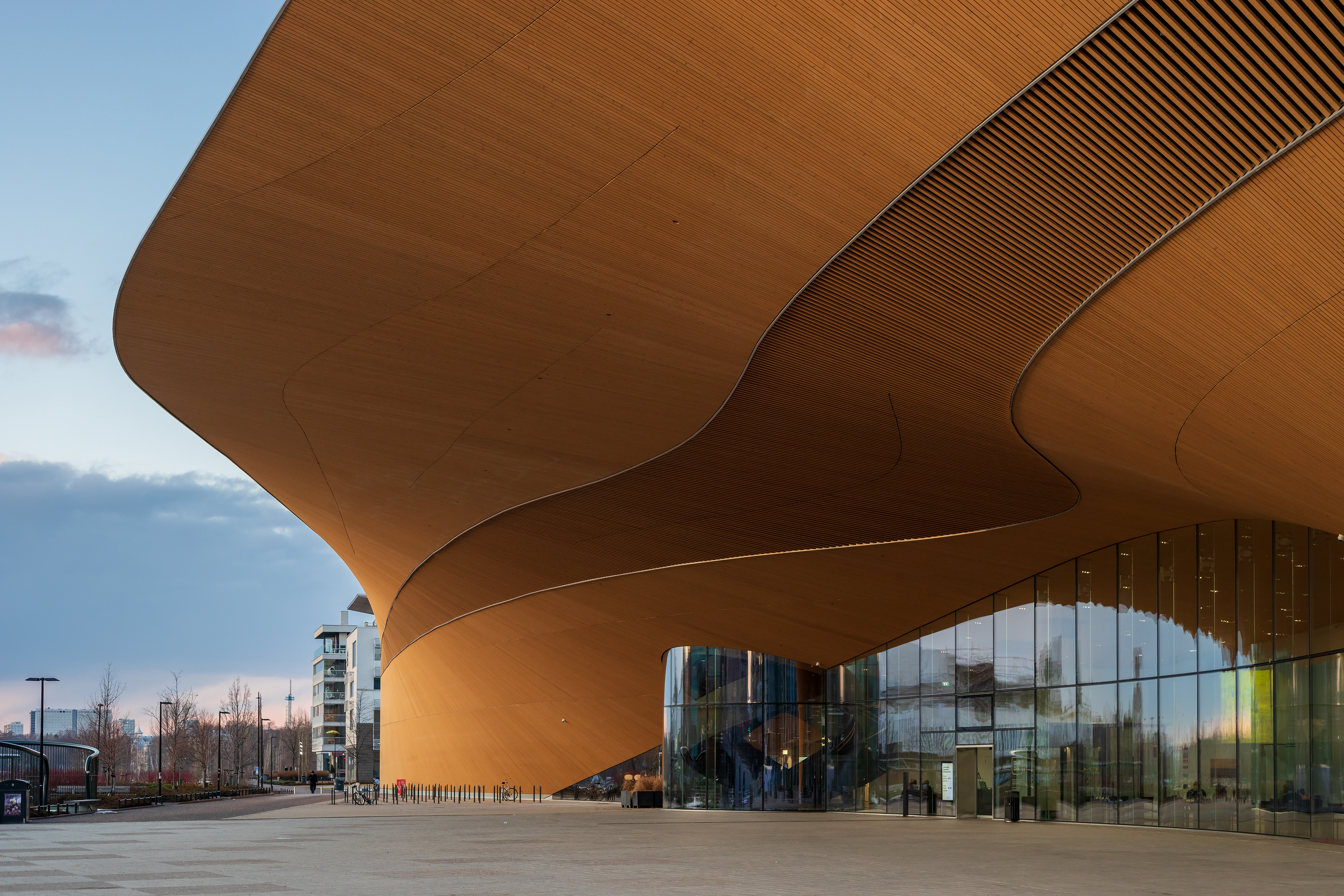

Green building is a technique that aims to create structures that are environmentally responsible and resource-efficient throughout their lifecycle – including siting, design, construction, operation, maintenance, renovation, and demolition. A 2009 report by the U.S. General Services Administration evaluated 12 sustainably designed GSA buildings and found they cost less to operate.

Wood products from responsible sources are a good choice for most green building projects – both new construction and renovations. Wood grows naturally using energy from the sun and is renewable, sustainable, and recyclable. It is an effective insulator and uses far less energy to produce than concrete or steel. Wood can also mitigate climate change because wood products continue to store carbon absorbed by the tree during its growing cycle, and because substituting wood for fossil fuel-intensive materials such as steel and concrete result in ‘avoided’ greenhouse gas emissions.

== Life cycle assessment ==
A life cycle assessment can help avoid a narrow outlook on environmental, social, and economic concerns by assessing each and every impact associated with all the stages of a process from cradle to grave (i.e., from raw materials through materials processing, manufacture, distribution, use, repair and maintenance, and disposal or recycling).

A comprehensive review of scientific literature from Europe, North America, and Australia pertaining to life cycle assessment of wood products concluded, among other things;

- Fossil fuel consumption, the potential contributions to the greenhouse effect, and the quantities of solid waste tend to be minor for wood products compared to competing products.
- Wood products that have been installed and are used in an appropriate way tend to have a favorable environmental profile compared to functionally equivalent products out of other materials.

A study by the Canadian Wood Council compared the life cycle impacts of three 2,400-square-foot (220 m^{2}) homes designed primarily in wood, steel, and concrete over the first 20 years of their lifespans. Relative to the wood design, the steel and concrete designs released more air pollution, produced more solid wastes, used more resources, required more energy, emitted more greenhouse gases, and discharged more water pollution.

When the complete life cycle is considered, including use and disposal, the great majority of the studies indicate that wood products have lower greenhouse gas emissions. In the few cases where wood products cause greater greenhouse gas emissions than their non-wood counterparts, the cause was inappropriate post-use disposal.

Tools are available that enable architects to judge the relative environmental merits of building materials. They include the ATHENA Impact Estimator for Buildings, which is capable of modeling 95% of the building stock in North America, and the ATHENA® EcoCalculator for Assemblies provides instant life cycle assessment results for common assemblies based on detailed assessments previously conducted using the Estimator. The EcoCalculator is available free from the non-profit Athena Sustainable Materials Institute in order to encourage greater use of LCA by design and building professionals.

== Wood and climate change ==
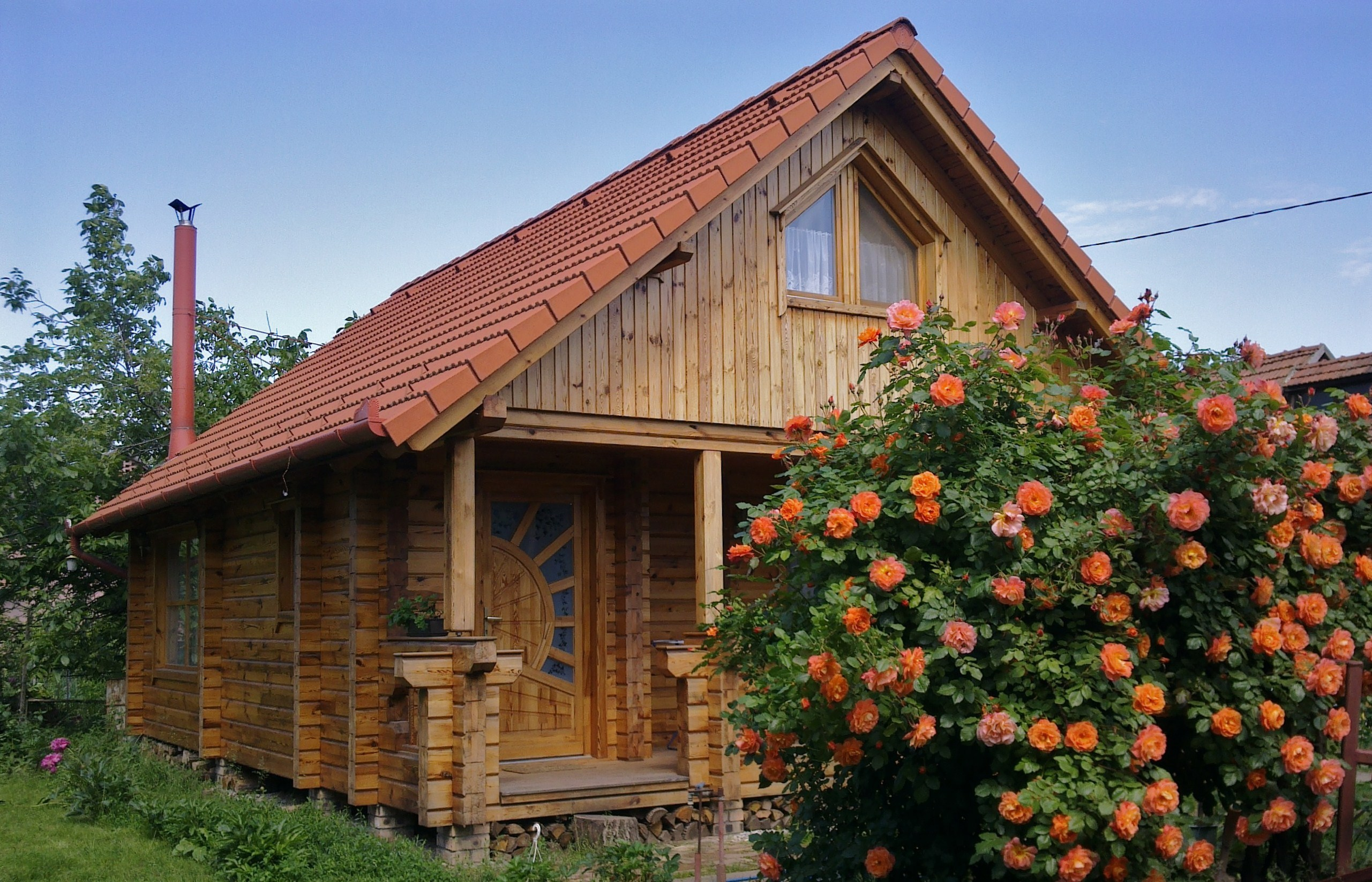
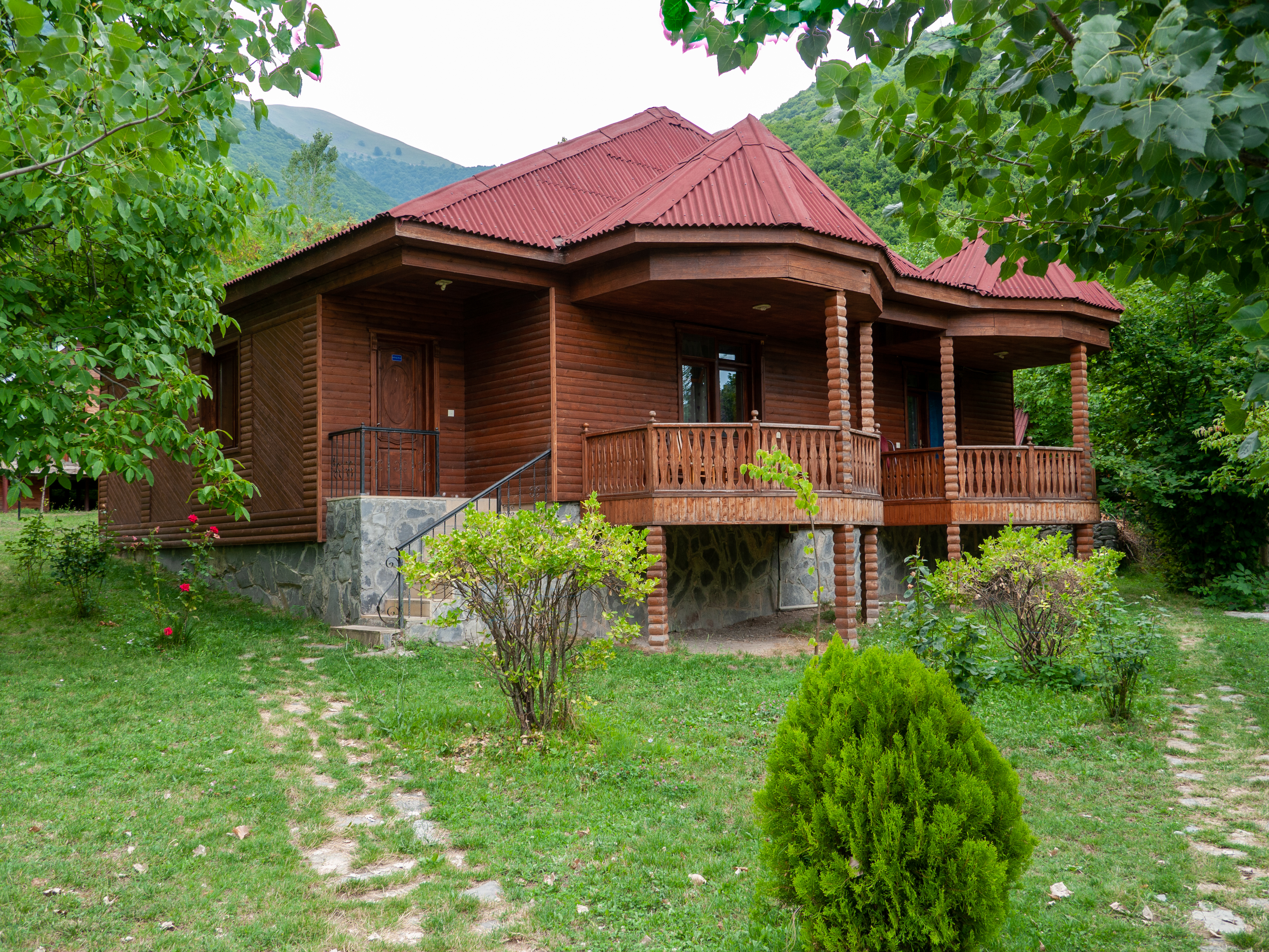
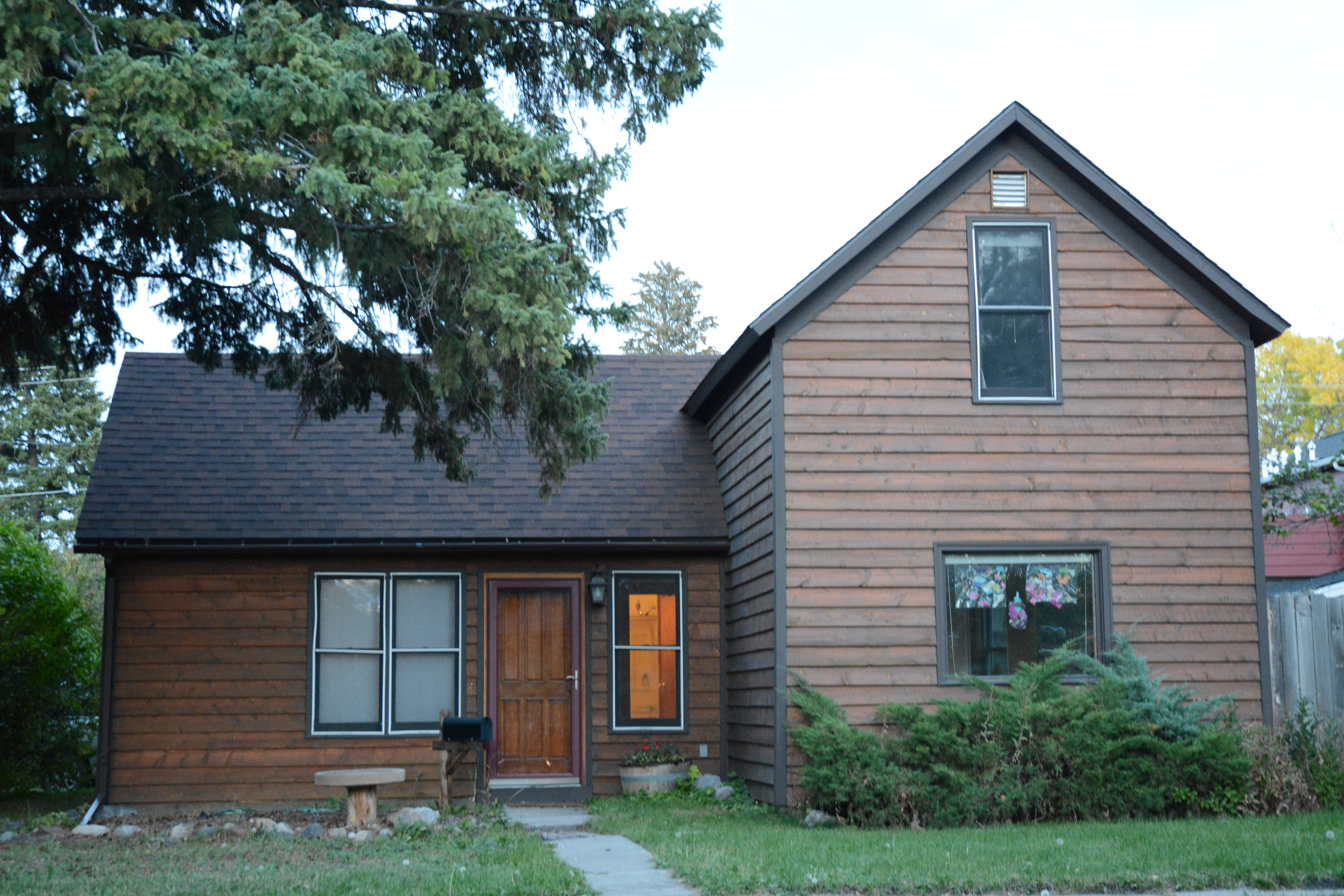
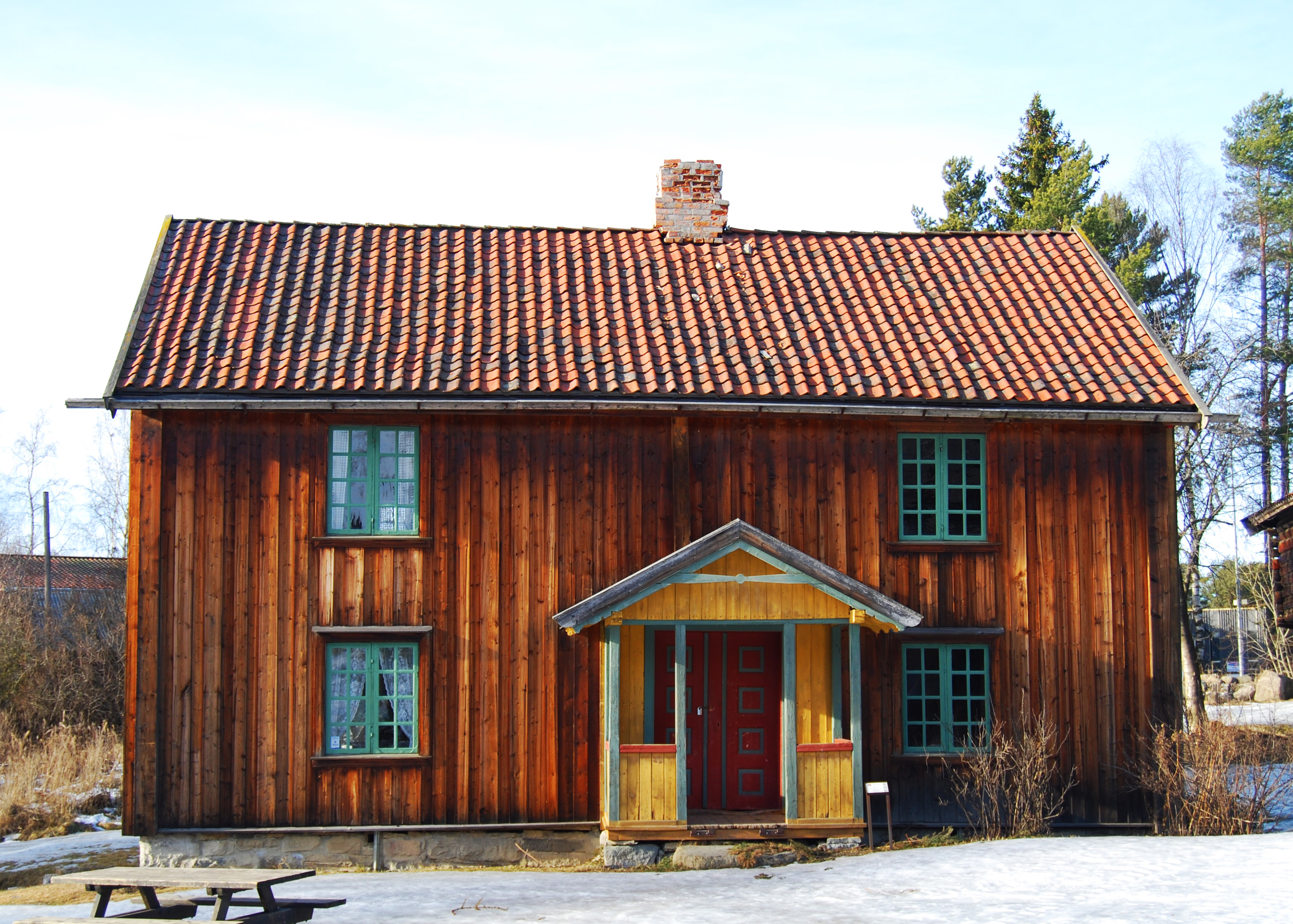
Some examples of wooden buildings

Trees absorb carbon dioxide and store it in biomass (wood, leaves, roots). When trees decompose or burn, much of the stored carbon is released back into the atmosphere, mainly as carbon dioxide, and some of the carbon remains in the forest debris and soils.

Harvested wood is used for products such as structural lumber or furniture, the carbon is stored for decades or longer. A typical 2,400-square-foot (220 m^{2}) home in North America contains 29 metric tons of carbon or the equivalent of offsetting the greenhouse gas emissions produced by driving a passenger car over five years (about 12,500 liters of gasoline.)

When wood replaces a fossil fuel for energy, or a construction material with a greater greenhouse gas footprint, this lowers greenhouse gas emissions.

Studies show that wood products are associated with far less greenhouse gas emissions over their lifetime than other major building materials. Substituting a cubic meter of blocks or brick with wood results in a significant saving of 0.75 to one tone of carbon dioxide.

Increasing the use of wood products in construction and for other long-lived uses, plus the use of wood byproducts and wood waste as biomass replacement for fossil fuels, can contribute to atmospheric greenhouse gas stabilization. The sustainable management of forests for the production of wood products is a feasible and beneficial part of an overall strategy to mitigate climate change.

Securing the Future, a United Kingdom government strategy for sustainable development, stated: “Forestry practices can make a significant contribution by reducing greenhouse gas emissions through increasing the amount of carbon removed from the atmosphere by the national forest estate, by burning wood for fuel, and by using wood as a substitute for energy-intensive materials such as concrete and steel.”

== The role of wood in carbon balances ==
FPInnovations, a Canadian non-profit research organization, conducted a literature review of 66 scientific peer-reviewed articles regarding the net impact on atmospheric greenhouse gases due to wood product use within a life cycle perspective. It showed several ways wood product substitution affects greenhouse gas balances, including:

- Less fossil fuel consumption in manufacturing;
- Avoidance of industrial process carbon emissions from cement manufacturing when wood products replace cement-based products;
- Carbon storage in wood products and in the forest; and
- Avoided fossil fuel emissions when wood biofuels replace fossil fuels.

== Energy efficiency ==
As high-performance buildings use less operating energy, the embodied energy required to extract, process, transport and install building materials may make up as much as 30% of the overall life cycle energy consumption. Studies such as the U.S. LCI Database Project show buildings built primarily with wood will have a lower embodied energy than those built primarily with brick, concrete or steel.

A recent case study of the Eugene Kruger Building in Quebec, Canada determined that the all-wood solution adopted for this 8,000-square-metre academic building resulted in a 40% reduction in embodied energy compared to steel and concrete alternatives.

A 2002 study compared production energy values for building components (e.g. walls, floors, roofs) made predominantly of wood, steel and concrete, and found that wood construction has a range of energy use from 185 to 280 Gigajoules (GJ), concrete from 265 to 521 GJ, and steel from 457 to 649 GJ. Wood construction will generally use less energy than other materials, although the high end of the range of wood construction energy overlaps with the low end of the range of concrete construction.

The passive design uses natural processes – convection, absorption, radiation, and conduction – to minimize energy consumption and improve thermal comfort. Researchers in Europe have identified wood as a suitable material for the development of passive buildings due to its unique combination of properties, including thermal resistance, natural finish, structural integrity, and lightweight and weatherproof qualities. Passive design is beginning to be incorporated in small buildings in North America through the use of structural wood panels.

Due to its cellular structure and many tiny air pockets, wood is a better insulator than steel and concrete in most climates – 400 times better than steel and 10 times better than concrete. More insulation is needed for steel and concrete to achieve the same thermal performance.

A 2002 study prepared by the National Association of Home Builders Research Center Inc. compared long-term energy use in two nearly identical side-by-side homes, one framed with conventional dimensional lumber and the second framed with cold-formed steel. It found the steel-framed house used 3.9% more natural gas in the winter and 10.7% more electricity in the summer.

== Health and well-being ==
Solid wood products, particularly flooring, are often specified in environments where occupants are known to have allergies to dust or other particulates.

Wood itself is considered to be hypo-allergenic and its smooth surfaces prevent the buildup of particles common in soft finishes like carpet. The use of wood products can also improve air quality by absorbing or releasing moisture in the air to moderate humidity. A study at the University of British Columbia and FPInnovations found that the visual presence of wood in a room lowers sympathetic nervous system (SNS) activation in occupants, further establishing the positive link between wood and human health. SNS activation is the way human bodies prepare themselves to deal with stress. It increases blood pressure and heart rate while inhibiting digestion, recovery and repair functions in order to deal with immediate threats. While necessary in the short term, prolonged periods in an SNS-activated state have a negative effect on the body's physiological and psychological health.

The study supports wood's value as a tool in evidence-based design (EBD) – a growing field that seeks to promote health and other positive outcomes such as increased productivity and well-being based on scientifically credible evidence. So far, EBD has focused largely on healthcare and, in particular, patient recovery.

== Reducing waste ==
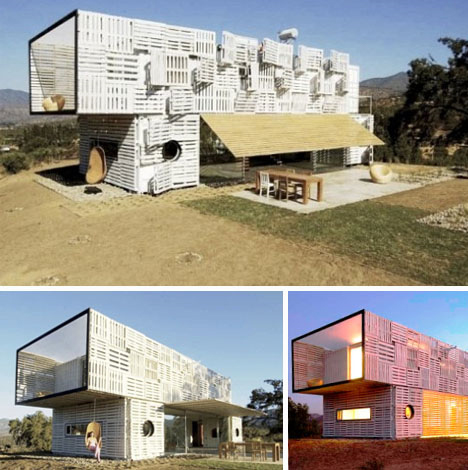
Wooden pallets used on a building's exterior to filter sunlight

Green building seeks to avoid wasting energy, water and materials during construction. Design and building professionals can reduce construction waste through design optimization, using right-sized framing members, for example, or pre-manufactured and engineered components.

The wood industry reduces waste in a similar way by optimizing sawmill operations and by using wood chips and sawdust to produce paper and composite products, or as fuel for renewable bioenergy. North American wood producers use 98 percent of every tree harvested and brought to a mill.

Rather than demolishing structures at the end of their useful life, they can be deconstructed to reclaim useful building materials rather than dumping them in the landfill.

When used properly, wood, concrete and steel can last for decades or centuries. In North America, most structures are demolished because of external forces such as zoning changes and rising land values. Designing for flexibility and adaptability secures the greatest value for the embodied energy in building materials.

Wood is versatile and flexible, making it the easiest construction material for renovations. Wood buildings can be redesigned to suit changing needs, whether this involves adding a new room or moving a window or door. Wood structures are typically easy to adapt to new uses because the material is so light and easy to work with. Few homeowner or professional remodelers have the skill and equipment needed to alter steel-frame structures.

Structural wood members can typically be reclaimed and reused for the same or similar purpose with only minor modifications or wastage, or remilled and fashioned into alternate products such as window and door frames. To reduce the amount of wood that goes to landfill, the CO_{2} Neutral Alliance (a coalition of government, NGOs and the forest industry) created the website dontwastewood.com. The site includes resources for regulators, municipalities, developers, contractors, owner/operators and individuals/homeowners looking for information on wood recycling.

== Responsible sourcing ==
Wood is a responsible environmental choice for construction as long as it comes from forests that are managed sustainably. Illegal logging and the international trade in illegally logged timber is a major problem for many timber-producing countries in the developing world. It causes environmental damage, costs governments billions of dollars in lost revenue, promotes corruption, undermines the rule of law and good governance and funds armed conflict. Consumer countries can use their buying power by ensuring the wood products they buy are from known and legal sources.

Deforestation, which is the permanent removal of forests where the land is converted to other uses such as agriculture or housing, is also a significant problem in developing countries, and globally accounts for 17% of the world's greenhouse gas emissions.

The forests most vulnerable to destruction are in tropical regions of the world, where the rate of deforestation was estimated at 32,000,000 acres (130,000 km^{2}) a year from 1990 to 2005. According to the State of the World's Forests Report, 2007, “the world lost about 3 percent of its forest area from 1990 to 2005; but, in North America, the total forest area remained virtually constant.” When forest land is converted for other uses, a portion of the deforestation can be offset by afforestation—such as the planting of trees on land that has been bare of trees for a long time.

Voluntary third-party forest certification is a credible tool for communicating the environmental and social performance of forest operations. With forest certification, an independent organization develops standards of good forest management, and independent auditors issue certificates to forest operations that comply with those standards. This certification verifies that forests are well-managed – as defined by a particular standard – and ensures that certified wood and paper products come from legal and responsible sources.

== Green building rating systems ==
A 2010 study by the Light House Sustainable Building Centre in British Columbia, Canada examined the ways in which the world's major voluntary green building rating systems incorporate wood. It found that rating systems for single-family homes in North America were the most inclusive of wood products and rating systems for commercial buildings and buildings outside of North America were the least inclusive. Systems studied included BREEAM (United Kingdom), Built Green (United States and Canada), CASBEE (Japan), Green Globes (United States), Green Star (Australia), LEED (launched in United States and used in countries such as Canada, China, India and Mexico), Living Building Challenge (United States and Canada), the NAHB – National Green Building Program (United States), and the SB Tool (Canada and UK).

In most cases, the rating systems offer credits/point for the use of wood in the following areas: certified wood; recycled /reused /salvaged materials; and local sourcing of materials. In some cases, building techniques and skills (such as advanced framing) and waste minimization are recognized, and most demand that all wood adhesives, resins, engineered and composite products contain no added urea formaldehyde and have strict limits on VOC (volatile organic compound) content.

== LEED certified wood credit ==
In December 2010, the U.S. Green Building Council failed to get enough yes votes from members for a proposed rewrite of the certified wood policy in its Leadership in Energy and Environmental Design (LEED) rating system. Since its inception, LEED has only accepted wood certified to Forest Stewardship Council standards. The two largest third-party forest certification standards in the United States – the Forest Stewardship Council (FSC) and the Sustainable Forestry Initiative (SFI) – opposed the proposed benchmarks. FSC questioned their rigor and SFI claimed the process was overly detailed and complex.

A number of organizations, including the National Association of State Foresters, the Canadian Institute of Forestry, and the Society of American Foresters called for LEED to recognize all credible certification programs to encourage the use of wood as a green building material.

In its 2008-2009 Forest Products Annual Review, the United Nations Economic Commission for Europe/Food and Agriculture Organization stated that green building initiatives (GBI) can be a mixed blessing for wood products. “GBI standards giving exclusive recognition to particular forest-certification brands may help drive demand for these brands at the expense of wider appreciation of the environmental merits of wood.”

In its 2009–2010 review, the UNECE/FAO reported growing convergence between certification systems: "Over the years, many of the issues that previously divided the (certification) systems have become much less distinct. The largest certification systems now generally have the same structural programmatic requirements."

== See also ==
- Alternative natural materials
- Ancient Chinese wooden architecture
- Carbon dioxide removal
- Ecological design
- Engineered wood
- Environmental planning
- Green woodworking
- Formaldehyde
- Glass in green buildings
- Helsinki Central Library Oodi
- Hemp as a building material
- Hempcrete
- List of low-energy building techniques
- List of tallest wooden buildings
- Log house
- Muskoka Boathouse
- Natural building
- Plyscraper
- Pollution
- Power tool
- Sawdust (wood dust) | Health hazards of sawdust
- Solvent
- Sustainable architecture
- Sustainable city
- Sustainable development
- TVOC
- Wood glue
- Wood preservative | Health hazards of wood preservative
- Woodworking
