= Glass in green buildings =

Material usage in sustainable architecture

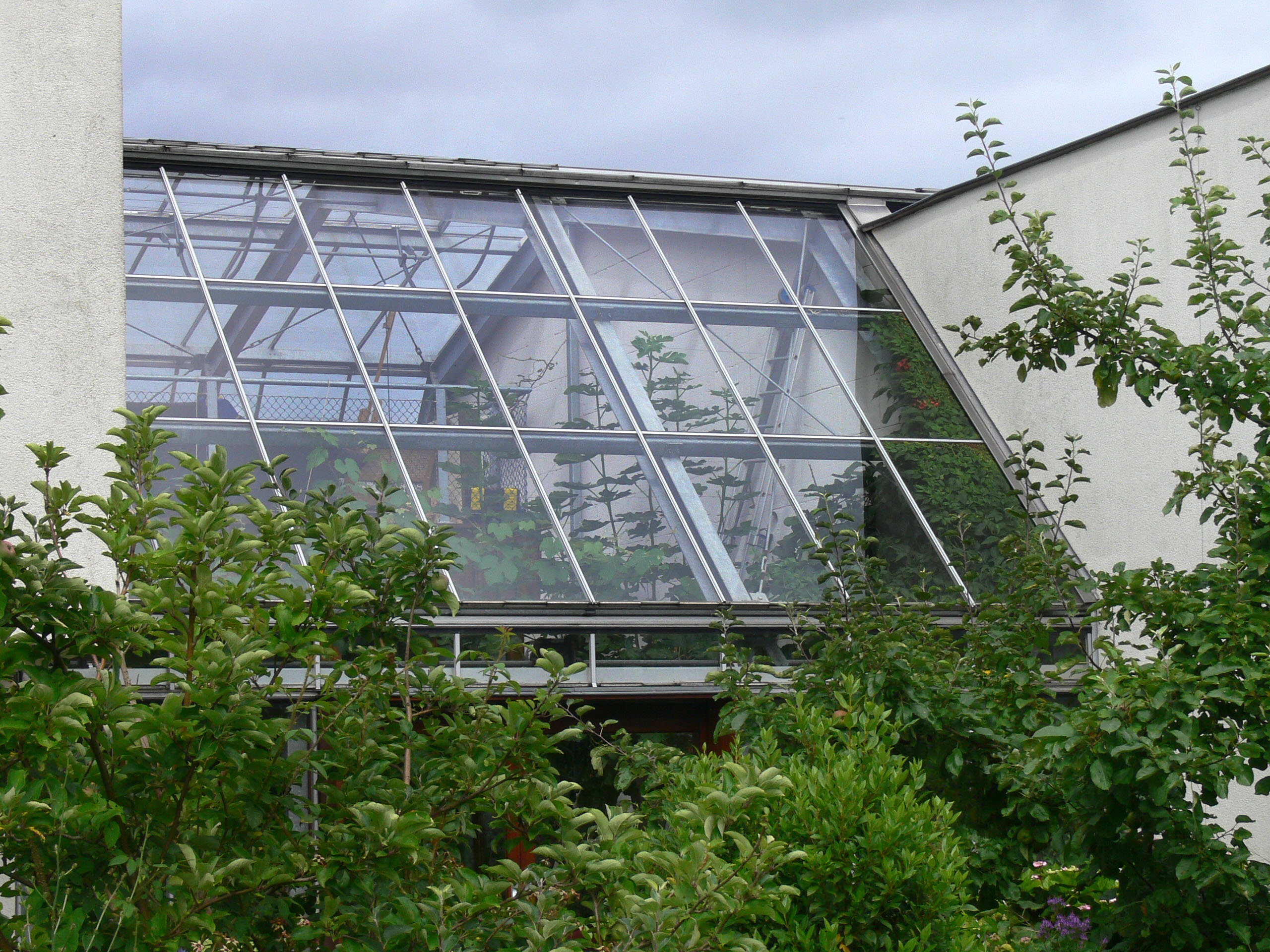
Greenhouse as house in E.V.A. Landmeier district (a "green district" named Landmeier, built at Culemborg, The Netherlands), which is a recent (1994-2009) district (semi-public eco-building) of approximately 250 ecological houses, several offices and an urban farm. The project is based on "Sustainable Implant" with a spatial combination of natural systems, technical approach of integrated waste (wastewater) / energy system and ecological and social purposes, for an urban neighborhood.

A green design concept is to facilitate sustainable use of the resources – energy, water and other materials – all through the complete life cycle of the building including its construction.

Glass is a useful material that has such advantages such as transparency, natural daylighting, permitting a sky view and acoustic control, depending on the glazing solution used. Glass is a recyclable material; recycling glazed windows reduces toxic waste improving sustainability in the environment.

Glass can play a role in accomplishing greater indoor environmental quality and when used carefully, glass can improve energy efficiency; however, a measured approach needs to be taken to ensure the building loads are not excessively increased due to solar gain. Glass combines functionality with aesthetic and is therefore used for modernized designs by architects and designers.

The intent of a green building design is to curtail the demand on non-renewable resources, amplify utilization efficiency of these resources when in use, and augment the reuse, recycling, and consumption of renewable resources.

== Double glazed glass ==
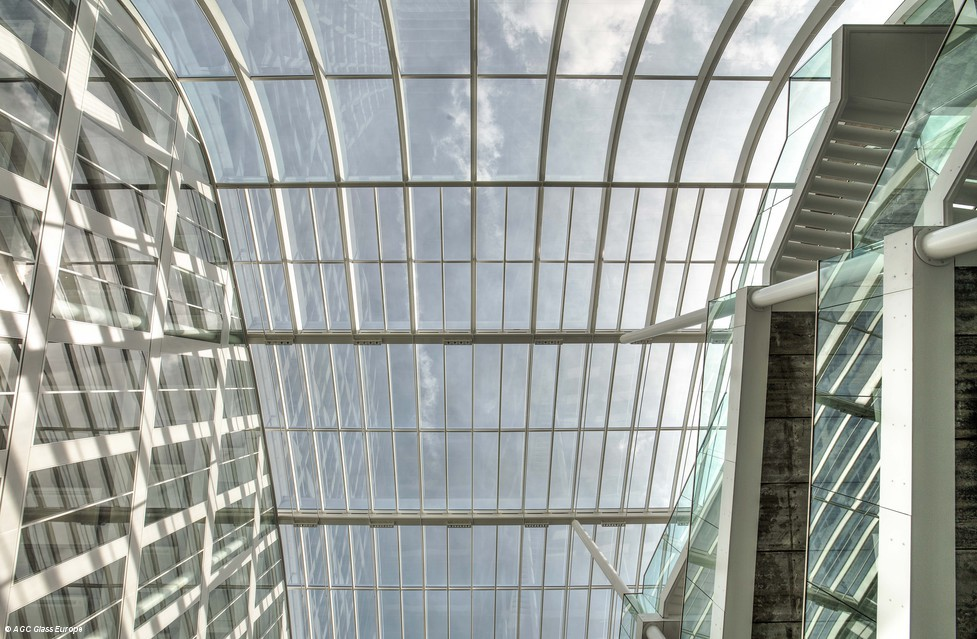
Brussels Environmental building is located in Belgium's urban renewal district of Brussels. Triple glaze glass is used for heat and sunlight reduction.

Architects use high-performance double-glazed glass, which is laminated or coated, to moderate interior temperatures by controlling heat loss and gain. The coating filters the heat-producing aspects of solar rays. The use of such glass in green buildings is used comprehensively in tropical climates as well as the Middle East.

== Solar control glass ==
Solar control glass reduces the energy consumption of a building while providing lighting because of the coatings in the glass that reflect the heat. The reflection and absorption of the heat help regulate the energy for greater sustainable buildings. Solar control glass with PCM double-glazed windows enhance insulation and increase the energy saving rate by 14.25% on warmer days. Furthermore, the saving rate increases to a higher rate of 41.53% with the addition of a refractive index of 3.

== Laminated Glass ==
Laminated glass consists of glass bonds that use PVB or EVA interlayers to decrease heat transferred. Laminated glass that is correctly tailored can be utilized in diverse climate. Laminated glass reduces the heat inserted by natural light therefore reducing the need for artificial light to illuminate a building. The heat reduction in addition with usage of natural light reduces energy cost and usage.

Enforcing laminated glass with PVB interlayers, causes greater durability; even when cracked, its integrity remains. However, the durability of laminated glass is greatly affected by moisture; studies have shown that moisture within PVB interlayers affects its durability, stiffness, and adhesion. Laminated glass is also prone to weathering and when cracked loses 80% of total energy absorption.

== Thermochromic Glass ==
Thermochromic glass is tint-based glass that tints based on temperature and heat passing through it. This style of glass is energy saving as the tint reduces the amount of light flowing inside a building. Thermochromic glass has the potential to reduce the temperature of 5.07 °C and consists of a thermal heating effect during the colder winter temperatures. The tint works as protection on sunny days which cause cooling energy reduction of 21-36%.

The production of thermochromic glass contributes to embodied carbon from extraction of materials and the manufacturing energy used. This may lead to environmental disturbances from depletion of natural recourses. It also depends on the usage of reversible optical devices in order to successfully regulate the temperature.

== See also ==
- Building-integrated photovoltaics
- Curtain wall (architecture)
- Deep energy retrofit
- Energy neutral design
- Environmental design
- Green building and wood
- Insulated glazing
- Low-energy house
- Passive house
- Passive solar building design
- Photovoltaics
- Quadruple glazing
- Rooftop solar power
- Solar shingle
- Solar water heating
- Sustainable design
- Zero-energy building
