= James Stewart (mathematician) =

Canadian mathematician and textbook author (1941–2014)

- Born: James Drewry Stewart; March 29, 1941; Canada
- Died: December 3, 2014 (aged 73); Toronto, Ontario, Canada
- Education: Stanford University; University of Toronto
- Known for: Work in harmonic analysis Functional analysis Calculus textbooks Integral House
- Scientific career
- Fields: Mathematics
- Workplaces: McMaster University; University of Toronto; University of London
- Doctoral advisor: Lionel Cooper

James Drewry Stewart, MSC (March 29, 1941 – December 3, 2014) was a Canadian mathematician, violinist, and professor emeritus of mathematics at McMaster University. Stewart is best known for his series of calculus textbooks used for high school, college, and university-level courses.

== Career ==
Stewart received his Master of Science at Stanford University and his doctor of philosophy from the University of Toronto in 1967. He worked for two years as a postdoctoral fellow at the University of London, where his research focused on harmonic and functional analysis. His books are standard textbooks in universities in many countries. One of his best-known textbooks is Calculus: Early Transcendentals (1995), a set of textbooks which is accompanied by a website for students.

Stewart was also a violinist and a former member of the Hamilton Philharmonic Orchestra.

== Integral House ==
From 2003 to 2009 a house designed by Brigitte Shim and Howard Sutcliffe was constructed for Stewart in the Rosedale neighbourhood of Toronto at a cost of $32 million. He paid an additional $5.4 million for the existing house and lot which was torn down to make room for his new home. Called Integral House (a reference to its curved walls, and their similarity to the mathematical integral symbol), the house includes a concert hall that seats 150. Stewart has said, "My books and my house are my twin legacies. If I hadn't commissioned the house I'm not sure what I would have spent the money on." Glenn Lowry, director of the Museum of Modern Art, called the house "one of the most important private houses built in North America in a long time."

== Personal life and political activism ==
Stewart was gay and involved in LGBT activism. According to Joseph Clement, a documentary filmmaker who is working on a film about Stewart and Integral House, Stewart brought gay rights activist George Hislop to speak at McMaster in the early 1970s, when the LGBT liberation movement was in its infancy, and was involved in protests and demonstrations.

== Death ==
In the summer of 2013, Stewart was diagnosed with multiple myeloma, a blood cancer. He died on December 3, 2014, aged 73.

== Honors ==
In 2015, he was posthumously awarded the Meritorious Service Cross.

== Publications ==
=== Books ===
- Stewart, James (2012). Essential Calculus (2nd ed.). Cengage Learning. ISBN 978-1-133-11229-7.
- Stewart, James (2012). Essential Calculus: Early Transcendentals (2nd ed.). Cengage Learning. ISBN 978-1-133-11228-0.
- Stewart, James; Watson, Saleem; Clegg, Daniel (2020). CALCULUS (9th ed.). Cengage Learning. ISBN 978-1-337-62418-3.
- Stewart, James; Watson, Saleem; Clegg, Daniel (2020). CALCULUS: Early Transcendentals (9th ed.). Cengage Learning. ISBN 978-1-337-61392-7.
- Stewart, James; Kokoska, Stephen (2023). CALCULUS: CONCEPTS AND CONTEXTS (5th ed.). Cengage Learning. ISBN 978-0-357-63249-9.
