= Dean A. Connor =

Canadian executive

Dean Connor
- Born: Hamilton, Ontario, Canada
- Education: Honours Business Administration (HBA) Ivey School of Business, University of Western Ontario
- Occupations: Chairperson of CPP Investments Board, Chair of the Board of Trustees of University Health Network
- Website: LinkedIn Profile Twitter

Dean Connor serves as Chairperson of the Canadian Pension Plan Investment Board and Chair of the Board of Trustees of the University Health Network. Connor was President and Chief Executive Officer of Sun Life Financial for ten years up to his retirement from that role in 2021.

== Early life ==
Connor was born in Hamilton, Ontario, Canada. He graduated in 1978 from the Honours Business Administration (HBA) program at the Ivey School of Business at the University of Western Ontario. He was a qualified actuary with the Fellow of the Society of Actuaries and the Canadian Institute of Actuaries.

== Career ==
=== Early career ===
In 1978, Connor joined Mercer Human Resource Consulting. Over the course of 28 years, he rose to CEO of Mercer's Canadian operations, focusing on the areas of investment, retirement, group benefits and compensation, and then to its President for the Americas, encompassing the U.S., Canada and Latin America.

=== Sun Life Financial ===
Connor joined Sun Life in 2006 as Executive Vice-President with responsibility for the Company's United Kingdom and Reinsurance operations, strategic international activities and corporate functions. He was appointed President of Sun Life's Canadian operations in 2008.

In 2010, Connor became Chief Operating Officer with executive responsibility for Sun Life's Canadian and United Kingdom operations, MFS Investment Management, Corporate Marketing, Human Resources, Information Technology and other shared business services.

Connor served as Sun Life's President and Chief Executive Officer from 2011 to 2021. Connor was named Canada's Outstanding CEO of the Year for 2017 based on his outstanding efforts in Vision and Leadership, Corporate Performance, Global Competitiveness, Innovation and Social Responsibility.

=== Canada Pension Plan Investments ===
Connor was appointed to the Board of Directors of the Canada Pension Plan Investments in August 2021, and was appointed Chairperson of its Board in October 2023.

=== Philanthropy/Associations ===
Connor serves as Chair of the Board of Trustees of University Health Network, Canada's largest academic health sciences centre.

Connor has previously served on the boards of the Business Council of Canada, Trillium Gift of Life Network, Roy Thompson and Massey Hall, the Canadian Life and Health Insurance Association, and the Asia Business Leaders Advisory Council.

He chaired Toronto Rehabilitation Institute's $100 million "Where Incredible Happens" campaign. Connor has been involved for many years with United Way of Canada, including the current Inclusive and Local Economic Opportunity (ILEO) project, and was the Chair of the 2017 United Way Campaign for Toronto and York Region.

== Honours and awards ==
- In 2014, Connor was named Top New CEO by Canadian Business magazine
- In 2017, Connor was recognized as One of the Top 40 Canadian Executives on Twitter and ranked one of the top 25 CEOs in Canada by Glassdoor
- In 2017, Connor was named Canada’s Outstanding CEO of the Year™
- In 2018, Connor was named Ivey Business Leader of the Year
- In 2019, Connor was named one of the 100 Best-Performing CEOs in the World by the Harvard Business Review

== Personal life ==
Connor is married to Maris Uffelmann and has three children.
