= Muskoka Boathouse =

- Interactive map of the Muskoka Boathouse area

General information
- Status: Completed in 1999
- Location: Point William, Muskoka, Ontario, Canada
- Coordinates: 45°0′10″N 79°26′48″W
- Client: Gerald Sheff and Shanitha Kachan

Technical details
- Floor area: 2,300 square ft.

Design and construction
- Architects: Brigitte Shim, Howard Sutcliffe
- Structural engineer: Atkins + Van Groll Engineering
- Services engineer: Toews Systems Design
- Other designers: Radiant City Millwork for Millwork and Takashi Sakamoto for Custom Fabrication

The Muskoka Boathouse was the first building to be commissioned of a twenty-year-long project on Point William located on the southwestern shore of Lake Muskoka in Muskoka, Ontario, Canada. The boathouse contained three areas: the interior area below with two boat slips, the living accommodation above totaling 64 m^{2} (689 sq. ft) and the wooden dock on the lake. The building, which was completed in 1999, is one of the four buildings commissioned on the property. The others include the Cottage, Guest Cottage and Garage.

The Muskoka Boathouse, designed by architects Brigitte Shim and Howard Sutcliffe of Shim-Sutcliffe Architects, was commissioned by the clients for the purpose of creating a warm and inviting point of connection for the clients' family and friends. In order to achieve this, Shim-Sutcliffe Architects worked with the clients, Gerald Sheff and Shanitha Kachan, from the beginning when searching for a peninsula situated in the Canadian Shield. In designing the boathouse, Shim-Sutcliffe’s main concept behind the project was “less is more”, meaning that the buildings on Point William would become a tool to experience nature. Shim and Sutcliffe chose the materials carefully so that the materials used on the inside would reflect the materials found surrounding the site. To better articulate this concept, natural materials were incorporated into the design as a way to experience nature both inside and outside. One of the ways this was done was through the vertical placement of the small wooden walls to mimic a forest.

== Site ==
The Muskoka Boathouse, which is located on Point William as part of the Point William Project, is situated in the Georgian Bay Ecoregion. This Ecoregion is situated on the southern portion of the Precambrian Shield, in south-central Ontario and can be characterized by the exposed complex Precambrian bedrock and rich mineral deposits which creates the rugged landscape associated with the region.Where the bedrock is not exposed, large mixed forests dominate the region with trees including black and white spruce, jack pine, tamarack, poplar, white birch and balsam. The lakes of this region combined with the deciduous forests of this ecoregion, which produce vibrant colours each fall, which makes this area a popular destination spot.

Surrounding the site, the Muskoka Boathouse exists in an area rich in Muskoka culture made up of Victorian cottages, pioneer log cabins and custom wooden boats built by local craftsmen. The initial site visit found conditions of mixed hardwoods, conifers, and the granite, which combined with the rich history of Muskoka culture would later be established in the design.

== Design ==
The boathouse was designed to create a balance between both modernism and the vernacular design of the Muskoka area. By using strategies such as conceptual arrangements, material palette, spatial organization and construction methods, the building achieved a balance between building and nature, land and water, and ultimately tradition and progress. In the design, the debate of which materials should have been used was considered heavily so the materials would reflect the outside. This was accomplished through small wooden walls which, when placed vertically, mimicked the forest’s edge and large mobile shutters were included to frame nature. Shim and Sutcliffe wanted the building to be used as “a tool to experience nature” so that no element on the inside is designed without a thought. With explorations in architectural language, furniture, lighting, hardware, and landscape, the project became an experiment at many scales. When visiting the site the three main elements that the pair observed were water, wood and rock, so the architects incorporated this observation into the design in order to achieve a balance between both building and nature.

Within the boathouse, there are subtle references to various modern architects such as Frank Lloyd Wright, Carlo Scarpa and Alvar Aalto. Wright influenced the overall design of the boathouse while Scarpa is referenced through the bearings at the top and bottom of four tapering timber posts that support a steel beam fronting onto the dock. Aalto was more subtly referenced through the tectonic gestures of the boathouse in the proportions of the timber-framed fenestration.

== Construction ==
The construction of the boathouse, which started in the winter, began by drawing the position of each crib and cutting a hole into the ice. As each crib was completed it was filled with granite ballast and lowered to settle on the lakebed. Shim and Sutcliffe used this method since it was proven to work as a traditional construction technique because the water exerts a steadying force similar to that of soil on land-based structures. After the reclaimed Douglas fir crates settled, construction began on top of the foundations in the spring. From the foundation, the boathouse’s heavy timber outer walls, milled from reclaimed industrial beams, emerged from the lake. The sleeping cabin, which was assembled with traditional log cabin methods, was designed to act as a light reflector with high vertical clerestory windows above that contrast with panoramic windows below.On the interior, cabinets of Douglas fir panels and mahogany windows are detailed to allow differential settlement from movement in the crib foundations.Traditional Victorian bead board ceilings were transformed into a shaped Douglas fir ceiling in the main room of the sleeping cabin while Mahogany duckboards in the bathroom were added to match the typical Muskoka boat deck. Throughout the construction of the boathouse, Shim and Sutcliffe always worked with the same contractors, carpenters and group of people.

== Awards ==
- 2004 Royal Architectural institute of Canada (RAIC), Governor General Medal for Architecture
- 2001 North American Wood Award Program, Wood Design Award of Honor
- 1999 Progressive Architecture Citation
