= Shim-Sutcliffe Architects =

Canadian architectural firm

- Type: Architectural firm
- Founded: 1994; 32 years ago
- Founder: Brigitte Shim, Howard Sutcliffe
- Headquarters: Toronto, Ontario, Canada
- Website: www.shim-sutcliffe.com

Shim-Sutcliffe Architects is a Canadian architectural design practice based in Toronto, Ontario.

== Practice ==
Shim-Sutcliffe Architects was founded in 1994 by Brigitte Shim and Howard Sutcliffe. Partners in work and in life, Shim and Sutcliffe have been collaborating since the early 1980s, and formed Shim-Sutcliffe Architects to pursue their shared interest and passion for the interrelation of architecture, landscape, interior design, and industrial design.

== Brigitte Shim ==
Brigitte Shim (born 1958, Kingston, Jamaica) emigrated to Canada in 1965. She received a degree in environmental studies in 1981 and architecture in 1983 from the University of Waterloo, Ontario. Shim apprenticed with architect Arthur Erickson in Vancouver in 1981 and worked with Baird/Sampson Architects in Toronto from 1983-1987. Shim has been a professor at the John H. Daniels Faculty of Architecture, Landscape and Design at the University of Toronto since 1988, where she teaches architectural design studios and courses in the history and theory of landscape architecture.

== Howard Sutcliffe ==
Howard Sutcliffe (born 1958, Yorkshire, England) emigrated to Canada in 1964. He studied at the University of Waterloo, where he also earned degrees in environmental studies (1981) and architecture (1983). After graduating, he worked successively in the studios of Paul Merrick in Vancouver and for Ronald Thom, Barton Myers, and Kuwabara Payne McKenna Blumberg (KPMB) Architects in Toronto. He was the first recipient of the Ronald J. Thom Award given for early design achievement by the Canada Council for the Arts.

== Recognition ==
To date, Shim and Sutcliffe have received 17 Governor General's Medal and Awards for Architecture from the Royal Architectural Institute of Canada (RAIC) and an American Institute of Architects (AIA) National Honor Award. In 2021 they were awarded the RAIC Gold Medal, the country's highest architectural honour in recognition of a significant and lasting contribution to Canadian architecture. The jury attributed their relentless pursuit of excellence to the production of a significant body of exceptional design works and determined that "the poetic quality and independence of their design work, their thoughtful and holistic consideration of site, materiality, typologies, the senses, and their inventiveness have made Shim and Sutcliffe exemplars of architectural practice in Canada." In 2013, the couple was presented with the Order of Canada for "designing sophisticated structures that represent the best of Canadian design to the world." They were also the recipients of the 2020 Heritage of the Future Award for "an outstanding body of work that prioritizes the integration of built form with natural environment, the innovative use of building materials, and exceptional design."

== Publications ==
Shim-Sutcliffe has their work published in a wide variety of mediums since established. Selected publications include:

- Shim-Sutcliffe: The 2001 Charles & Ray Eames Lecture published by Michigan Architecture Papers, 2002
- Site Unseen: Laneway Architecture & Urbanism in Toronto edited by Brigitte Shim & Donald Chong, 2004
- Integral House by Brigitte Shim and Edward Burtynsky, 2006
- Five North American Architects: An Anthology by Kenneth Frampton, 2012
- Shim-Sutcliffe: The Passage of Time edited by Anette W. LeCuyer, 2014
- Canadian Architecture: Evolving a Cultural Identity by Leslie Jen, 2021
- Shim-Sutcliffe: The Architecture of Point William; A laboratory of living edited by Kenneth Frampton & Michael Webb, 2021

== Notable Projects ==
- 1988: Garden Pavilion and Reflecting Pool
- 1989: House on Horse Lake
- 1994: Laneway House
- 1995: Craven Road House
- 1999: Muskoka Boathouse
- 2000: Moorelands Camp Dining Hall
- 2001: Weathering Steel House
- 2004: Ravine Guest House and Reflecting Pool
- 2004: Corkin Gallery
- 2006: Craven Road Studio
- 2009: Integral House
- 2013: Residence for the Sisters of St. Joseph Toronto
- 2015: Wong Dai Sin Temple
- 2022: Ace Hotel Toronto

Shim-Sutcliffe Architects also debuted specialty furniture and lighting items for their clients. Most well known is the HAB Collection that is currently manufactured and distributed by Nienkämper. Another popular item from the studio is the Firefly Lamp which is meant to resemble fireflies in a mason jar that glows even after the lamp is turned off.
