= Mark Machin =

British investor (born 1966)

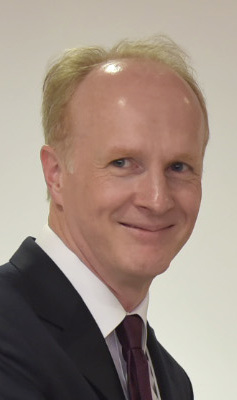
Machin in Davos in 2018

Mark Machin (born 1966) is a British investor who served as president and CEO of the Canada Pension Plan Investment Board between 2016 and 2021.

Machin is currently a non-executive director for Serendipity Capital, a Singapore-based venture capital group. He also sits on the Board of the Atlantic Council and is a member of the 30% Club of Canada, with a mission to achieve at least 30% representation of women on all boards and C-suites globally. He is also the chairman of Society For Project Green Leaf.

== Early life and education ==
Machin was born in England in 1966. He earned a Bachelor of Arts degree in Physiological Sciences from Oxford University and then a Bachelor of Medicine, Bachelor of Surgery degree from Cambridge University in 1990.

== Career ==
Over the years, Machin developed an interest in financial markets and was hired as an analyst in the London office of Goldman-Sachs in 1991. Machin was transferred to the Goldman-Sachs' new Hong Kong office where he worked for 20 years focusing on Capital Markets and Investment Banking in Asia. He was Asia Head of Investment Banking for Goldman-Sachs for six years.

In 2012, Machin left Goldman-Sachs to become Senior Managing Director and President of CPPIB Asia. In 2013, he became Head of International, where he was responsible for the organization’s international investment activities, managing global advisory relationships and leading the organization internationally.

Machin was appointed CEO of the CPPIB in June 2016. Under his leadership, CPPIB grew its net assets to almost C$500 billion. Machin is also credited with prioritizing gender diversity. He was named both a Catalyst Honours Champion for 2020, which recognizes those making workplaces equitable and inclusive for women, and one of Canada’s Top 10 CEOs by Glassdoor in its 2018 Employee Choice Awards.

Machin was also Chairman of the board of directors of FCLTGlobal, a think tank established in 2016 and was on the board of Sequoia Heritage until December 2020.

In June 2021, Machin was appointed as a non-executive director of Singapore-based venture capital group, Serendipity Capital, which invests in financial services, technology and climate-focused companies.

== Personal life ==
Machin has spent 22 years in Asia and lived in various cities including Beijing and Hong Kong, and moved to Toronto following his appointment as the CEO of CPPIB in 2016. Machin owned the Integral House, which was built by the late mathematician James Stewart.

=== CPPIB Resignation ===
On 26 February 2021, Machin tendered his resignation to the board of CPPIB, following reports that he had traveled to the UAE to receive a Pfizer–BioNTech COVID-19 vaccine with his partner. In an internal memo sent to staff, Machin said that while he had completed all the proper procedures for the trip, it was meant to be "very private" and he regretted the negative connections brought to the CPPIB.

The office of Chrystia Freeland, Canada's finance minister, criticized Machin's decision while recognizing its independence from governments.

Machin was succeeded by John Graham, CPPIB’s global head of credit investments.

On 4 March 2021, The Globe and Mail reported that Machin was likely to resign from his position sometime later in 2021 after more than 5 years in the role, and that he had already tapped John Graham to be his successor before the resignation, when the transition timeline was accelerated.
