= David F. Denison =

Canadian businessperson

David F. Denison OC FCA
- Education: University of Toronto
- Occupation: Businessperson

David F. Denison OC FCA is a Canadian businessperson and the former chair of Hydro One and Hydro One Inc. He is the former president and chief executive officer of the Canada Pension Plan Investment Board.

== Biography ==
Denison earned a bachelor's degree in both mathematics and education from the University of Toronto. He is a Chartered Professional Accountant and a Fellow of the Institute of Chartered Accountants of Ontario.

Denison was the Chair of the Canadian Coalition for Good Governance from June 4, 2009, to June 15, 2011, and has served as a corporate director since June 23, 2005. He has had an extensive career in financial services within Canada, the United States and Europe, with firms including Fidelity Investments (founded as Fidelity Management and Research Company), Merrill Lynch, S. G. Warburg, Midland Walwyn (bought by Merrill Lynch 2013), and Mercer.

He is currently a director of the United Way of Canada.

In 2014, he was named an Officer of the Order of Canada.

Business positions
Preceded by John A. MacNaughton	CEO of CPP Investment Board; 2005 – June 30, 2012 ------ 2009 compensation: $ 2,850,000	Succeeded by Mark Wiseman
