= Lobbying in Canada =

Lobbying in Canada is an activity where organizations or people outside of government attempt to influence the decision making of elected politicians or government officials at the municipal, provincial or federal level.

Lobbying has changed in Canada from a period where it was restricted to economic and social elites to the modern day, when lobbying is used as a tool by many forms of civil society organizations to advance their view for what society and government should look like, with approximately 9,000 people working as registered lobbyists at Canada's federal level as of 2024, across approximately 3,500 organizations. Lobbying began as an unregulated profession, but since the late 20th century has been regulated by government to increase transparency and establish a set of ethics for both lobbyists, and those who will be lobbied. Canada does not require disclosure of lobbyist spending on lobbying activities.

== History ==
=== Pre-Colonization ===
Scholarship on influencing of decision-makers within various First Nations is sparse. Traditions and practices likely may have varied widely from nation to nation.

=== Two Canadas Period ===
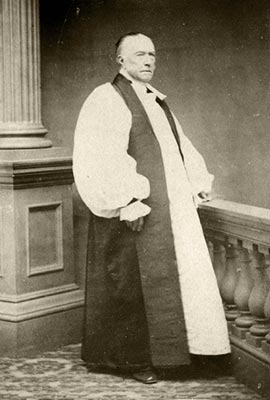
Bishop Strachan, who at the centre of the Family Compact, was both lobbied by elites, and very effectively lobbied the government.

The political culture in colonial Canada was imported from the British and French traditions, including early forms of political influence such as submission of petitions, which existed from the start of Canada's parliamentary structure.

Lobbying in the early 1800s was dominated by the Family Compact and Château Clique, informal networks of the social elite, engaging in clientelism, where economic favours are exchanged for political favours, and patronage, where government posts are given out to favoured political supporters instead of by merit. The Family Compact was weakened by the 1830s reform movement in then Upper Canada, seeing irrelevance by the mid-1840s. The Château Clique was similarly irrelevant due to changes instituting responsible government in then Lower Canada, seeing irrelevance by the late 1830s. During this period, the decision-makers that lobbyists were looking to influence were unelected Lieutenant Governors in addition to their Executive Councils (usually elites appointed to upper legislative chambers). elected lower houses of legislatures, and judicial officials. There was also substantial representation of the Family compact in these institutions in Upper Canada.

In Lower Canada, the clique was led by anglophone merchants, and succeeded in abolishing the Seigneurial system, but failed to abolish civil law. The influence of the compact and clique influence was substantially lessened after responsible government reforms such as elected upper houses brought on by the Durham Report after violence between the Family Compact and its oligopic state power and William Lyon Mackenzie's reform rebellion. Due to the close-knit informal nature of these organizations, lobbying was largely restricted to those with economic power, religious power or social status. For example, the Bank of Upper Canada, closely associated with the Family Compacy, lobbied the Lieutenant Governor of Upper Canada that no other bank should be chartered in the province, arguing that smaller banking establishments were more prone to collapse, as had been seen in the United States.

Canadian political scientist Robert Presthus highlights that early interest groups had formed by this period. In 1792, the first agricultural association identifiable by Presthus, the Agricultural Association of Quebec had been formed. The first industry group, the Montreal Board of Trade was founded in 1822. The first literary or historical society, which presumably solicited funding from the government, was founded in Quebec in 1824. The first interest group in the field of welfare was the Society for Relief of Strangers in Distress, in Toronto in 1827. Presthus finally identifies the first educational interest group, the Royal Institute for Advancement of Learning of Quebec in 1829.

=== Province of Canada Period ===
After unification of the two Canadas, greater power was vested in party leaders and the civil service. Patronage and clientelism continued, but with a decreased emphasis on religious elites. Little is known about lobbying in this period.

=== Atlantic Provinces Pre-Confederation ===
Nova Scotia was the first Canadian adopter of responsible government. Some evidence exists of relationships between Nova Scotia pre-Confederation premier Charles Tupper, who prior to Confederation was a strong supporter of the interest of trans-Canada railway companies, and negotiating with the General Mining Association, which had a de facto monopoly on mining.

Early Canadian colonial history also gives early examples of lobbying in such a way as to defeat government action. When minister of finance Alexander Galt attempted to issue provincial debentures in Canada West in the 1860s, bankers and merchants in "western Canada"—here likely referring to Southwestern Ontario, opposed the debentures and led Galt to withdraw, leading to Galt's eventual resignation.

=== Confederation Period ===
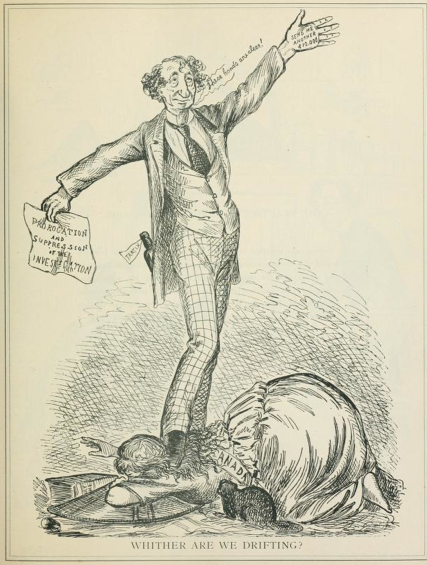
A political cartoon of John A. Macdonald, lampooned for corruption. On his hand, "Another 10,000" references a request for more private donations for him to give a railway contract.

After Confederation, informal relationships between economic elites and first ministers continued, with the Pacific Scandal resulting from the Canadian Pacific Railway lobbying through bribery of first post-Confederation Prime Minister John A. Macdonald, causing MacDonald to favour the bid of the CPR over a competing company.

In this period, Canadian manufacturers may also have been involved in lobbying for protections by import tariffs under John A. Macdonald's national policy, and certainly lobbied for its continuance when the tariffs were under threat in 1911. During this time, the interests of Nova Scotia coal companies were also the subject of lobbying, with member of parliament for Cumberland, Charles Tupper, being persuaded by coal producers to lobby for increased coal tariffs.

In the 1910s, various cities in Canada saw the importation of an American model of civic committees for beautification. In Halifax for example, a committee formed from the local business interests by the Halifax Board of Trade lobbied the municipal government for investment in civic centres. Various civic committees engaged in a strategy of hiring British planning experts to give speeches locally, leading to the creation of Canada's first municipal planning acts. These touring speeches were also paired with early instances of a non-governmental groups publicly circulating model legislation, not only locally, but lobbying for unified municipal planning bylaws across Canada.

In 1918, the political patronage system was abolished for the federal public service, reducing the ability to lobby to be placed into a certain role.

Bribery and corruption continued to be a theme of lobbying through the 1930s, when the Beauharnois scandal highlighted a cash-for-contract scheme similar to the Pacific Scandal.

=== Post Second World War ===
The period after the Second World War saw the United States institute its first comprehensive legislation restricting activities of lobbyists in 1946, but Canada declined to do so until 1989.

The 1960s saw the advent of a number of new civic society groups, including many not associated with business interests. Groups that may have existed previous to the Second World War saw increased relevance, such as civil liberties group CCLA, municipal advocacy group FCM, and professional groups such as the CMA, CBA, and CAUT, representing doctors, lawyers, and university professors, respectively. New organizations began as well: environmental groups and the umbrella advocacy alliance Canadian Council for International Co-operation were both founded in the 1960s. The model of advocacy partnership was popular during this time, seeing conglomerations of interest groups under common banners, such as the Canada Grains Council, which was an umbrella organization representing farmers groups, railway groups, ports groups, and the Saskatchewan Association of Rural Municipalities, all of which had an interest in a robust grain economy and ease of grain shipping.

The emergence of the interest group can be linked to the "Old Tory" tradition of Great Britain, where networks of elites were thought to play an important role in informing the political system as to the development of policy. Lobbyists in the 1970s for example, were often part of not only one interest group, but on average, three.

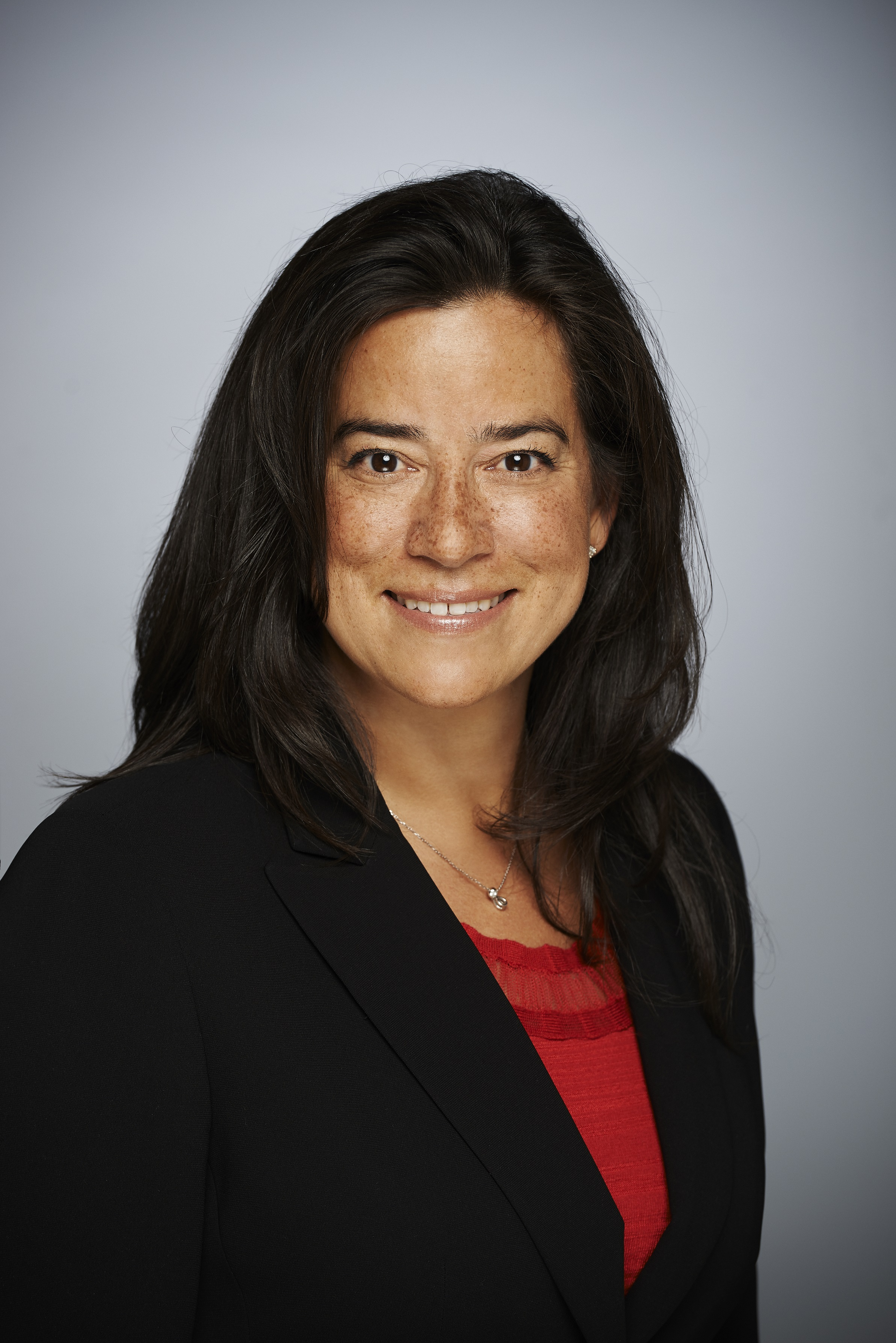
Jody Wilson Raybould, a previous Attorney General of Canada, who would resign from Justin Trudeau's cabinet in 2019 over her being improperly lobbied

=== 21st Century ===
Contemporary events in Canadian lobbying include reforms brought about after the sponsorship scandal. While the kickback scheme did not apparently involve lobbying in the traditional sense, the Gomery Commission did make recommendations which were incorporated into legislation in 2006, which led to increased restrictions coming into force in 2008, including broader ability to prosecute lobbyists, and established the Commissioner of Lobbying, an officer of parliament, outside of the direct control of the government.

The 21st century also saw the first successful prosecution of a lobbyist under lobbying legislation for a lobbyist failing to register in 2013.

Under the Justin Trudeau Ministry, multiple lobbying scandals have had significant public attention. The SNC-Lavalin affair, where lobbying was conducted to implement deferred prosecutions in the Canadian Criminal Code, which the Public Prosecution Service of Canada and Attorney General Jody Wilson-Raybould refused to implement despite the Office of the Prime Minister's requests. The improper influence of the Attorney General against the Shawcross principle became a major scandal which was criticized by the Conflict of Interest and Ethics Commissioner in a 2019 report.

During the COVID-19 pandemic, lobbying by WE Charity of the government to create a program that the charity was uniquely well situated to bid for became an issue, leading to the WE Charity scandal and WE Charity's subsequent winddown of Canadian operations. The issue with lobbying included whether inviting the family of the Prime Minister, Justin Trudeau to attend events run by the charity, with expenses paid, constituted a conflict of interest and improper lobbying.

During the 21st century, technology such as allowing for e-mail and digital submissions has increased the accessibility of lobbying. Over 700 groups were able to submit budget briefs to the finance committee in connection with the federal budget, including not only industry groups, but individuals, charities, not-for-profits, academics and labour unions. The top 10 lobbying organizations of 2012 were still dominated specifically by business interests, but the World Society for the Protection of Animals as a non-profit was one of the Top 10.

With reforms in the Trudeau Ministry to the Senate of Canada, lobbying of Senators increased about 600% between 2015 pre-reform to 2017 post-reform, as Senators are now seen to have more independence and more authority to propose amendments to legislation for the House to implement.

== Legislative Frameworks ==
=== Federal ===
==== History ====
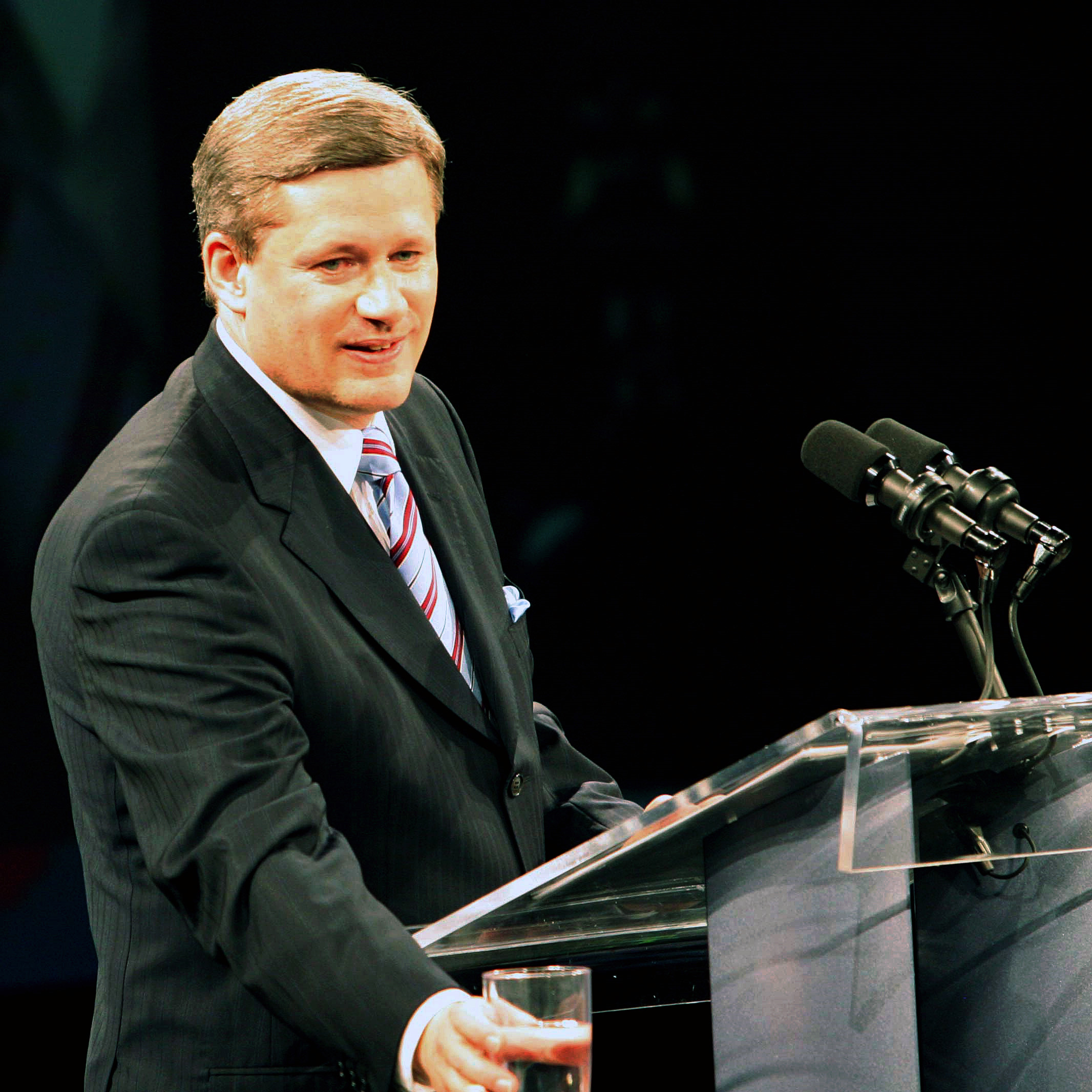
Stephen Harper during his 2006 election campaign. After this campaign, he would go on to be Prime Minister, and substantially reform the Lobbyist Registration Act.

The legislation that regulates the lobbying industry is found in the lobbying act. The Lobbying Act began as the Lobbyists Registration Act, which came into force in 1989 after approximately 20 years of interest expressed through private member's bills. The motivation of the act was to provide a record of who the lobbyists on the federal level were, and what meetings they were having. The registration act also created the role of Registrar of Lobbyists, whose role was primarily one of collecting and releasing information as required by the act, and did not possess substantial enforcement powers. The Act was amended in 2003 after two years of study, where recommendations adopted included giving investigatory power, establishing a mandatory 5-year review, and establishing that the politicians who were lobbied also have their names published. These amendments and others were enacted in a 2003 bill, but did not take force until 2005.

In 2006, Stephen Harper ran on an accountability-centric platform, including a major overhaul to lobbying legislation. After election in a minority parliament, Prime Minister Paul Martin resigned, and the Governor General, Michaëlle Jean invited Harper to form government, where he introduced omnibus legislation, the Federal Accountability Act, which reformed a number of acts, including renaming the Lobbyists Registration Act to the Lobbying Act. The provisions in this amendment entered into force in 2008, and included establishing the Lobbying Commissioner as an independent officer of parliament, meaning the government (Prime Minister and cabinet) has no authority to command the commissioner. The act also established a prohibition on many previous civil servants (usually at the level of assistant deputy minister or above) from becoming a lobbyist for the first 5 years after leaving their government post, extending the length of time after an infringement that a lobbyist could be prosecuted (from 2 to 10 years), and some other changes stemming from recommendations of the Gomery Commission.

==== Current Legislation ====
The current act defines lobbying as persons receiving paid compensation to communicate with public office holders about changes to government law, regulation or programs, or to obtain a government contract. The act then defines a lobbyist as anyone who spends more than 20% of their time in any given month doing lobbying or preparing for lobbying. The act requires those lobbyists to register and, if they have done any lobbying activity during a month, to provide a monthly report on their activities, including the date, name of the office holder they contacted, and the subject of their communications. These reports are then placed for free public access on the website of the Commissioner of Lobbying.

The act also establishes a statutory code of conduct for lobbyists, including not just rules that lobbyists must follow, but also as of the 2006 amendment, also make the principles that they must follow carry punishment if they contravene the principles. The code of conduct was most recently amended in 2015 after recommendations from the commissioner to parliament on how to update the code.

The Commissioner of Lobbying is responsible for not only conducting enforcement, but also providing clarifications, either proactively or on request, as to what activities do or do not comport with lobbying regulation.

Penalties under the act range from fines of between $0 and $200,000, and imprisonment of up to 2 years for an indictable (serious) offence. Few lobbyists have ever been prosecuted under the legislation, and only about 20 formal investigations since investigatory powers were added to the act.

==== Comparison to other Legislation ====
In a thorough 2018 comparative politics book chapter comparing Canada, the US and the UK, Jeremy Sapers found that Canada was an early adopter of lobbying legislation, with the United States as a frontrunner, and Canada being one of the first four countries globally to establish legislation. Sapers characterizes Canada's system as facilitating easy entry into the profession of lobbying. He also notes that Canada, like the US, differs from lobbying to the European Union, as registration of lobbyists in the EU system was voluntary. Sapers concludes that Canada's regulatory regime is commendable, but below the standards of the United States, with further financial disclosures being the key weakness of Canada's regime, as Canada does not require disclosure of lobbyist spending on lobbying activities.

=== Provincial ===
Every province has its own lobbying legislation regarding lobbying officials in that province, and federal law does not apply to lobbying provincial officials. These acts are usually styled as Lobbyist's Registration acts, except in Alberta and Saskatchewan, where it is styled the Lobbyist Act, and Quebec, where it is styled as the Lobbying Transparency and Ethics Act. The Yukon Territory also has a lobbying act, though no act exists for the Northwest Territories or Nunavut. The Northwest Territories declined to enact legislation in 2015.

== Lobbying Industry ==
=== Professional Lobbying Associations ===
Lobbyists in Canada are not automatically part of any registered association, and while they have oversight by a government agency, they do not have any mandatory self-regulatory professional organization such as other professions such as Professional Engineers Ontario, or College of Physicians and Surgeons of Ontario. Lobbyists may however choose to join a voluntary professional association such as the Canadian Association of Political Consultants, which represents lobbyists as well as media consultants, political staffers, pollsters and others, both provincially and federally. This association does maintain a code of ethics which provides guidelines for actions, though has no enforcement value. Another association is the Public Affairs Association of Canada, which conducts advocacy work on behalf of the lobbying profession on the topic of lobbying regulation, and also provides services to members such as running networking events, and is likewise open to a wide range of political jobs.

=== Employment ===
Estimates for the number of lobbyists in Canada are at roughly 5000 lobbyists in the federal system as of 2011. Of these 5000, about 84% or 4300 worked within a not-for-profit or a corporation as an "in-house lobbyist", while about 800 worked as "consultant lobbyists", or in firms that sell lobbying services to other organizations on a contract basis. More lobbyists may likely be found registered provincially but not federally. As of 2024, the number of lobbyists who had registered had reached 9,000.

== Practices ==
=== Interest Group Associations and Incorporations ===
Most lobbyists are in-house, meaning they work as a full employee of an organization, not a contractor. These lobbyists can be part of for-profit corporations, or other not-for-profit organizations, and exist in roughly equal proportion. Corporate lobbyists are therefore hired with money generated from the corporation's income, but not-for-profit organizations are more often funded by donations or memberships. Lobbying usually focuses on aligning the interests of the lobbying principal (the organization who hired the lobbyist) with the interests or objectives of the government. For example, almost every government is interested in growing the economy, so the Canadian Federation of Independent Business frames their interests in generally more permissive regulations through the lens of a "stronger business environment", implying economic growth, employment, and general tax revenue. As another example, when provincial government in Ontario switched in 2018 to the Ford Ministry, focused on slimming government, doing-more-with-less, and an educational focus of making students ready for the workforce, an alignment that was likely to favour career colleges, the Council of Ontario Universities, which represents traditional universities issued a statement emphasizing their job-training function that they play.

In-house lobbyists are generally centered in interest groups, usually styled as "associations". Many associations, as of the 1970s, explicitly have government relations in their mandates or founding objects. These associations in the 1970s were typically staffed by 2 or more full-time staff, including a director and a secretary, and many had others working in research or communications functions. Most of them were funded by member dues, with different forms of memberships having different prices. The governance of these groups typically had an incorporated structure with annual general meetings, a board of directors, a president elected among the directors, and an executive director. The associations often had a multi-level structure by 1970, with many associations having provincial branches or caucuses. Swiss sociologist Robert Michels has characterized interest organizations as typically having an oligarchical structure, with a membership that is not highly engaged, and directors and staff that spend a large amount of time focusing on the political sphere and as a result are given deference. The director in this model begins to function as an intermediary between members of the association and with government officials, as well as an intermediary between members and the public through communication campaigns and through spokesmanship.

Most associations were historically in the business or industry space, but Presthus notes that in 1970, there was substantial quantitively variation in the number of provincial advocacy groups, with more labour unions in BC, more business industries in Ontario, and more welfare groups in Quebec. He also notes that at the time, there were relatively few agricultural associations, that he speculates may be due to heavy rural representation. He also notes that the most common group of advocacy groups are locally based, presumably travelling to Ottawa on occasion, rather than having a federal membership, though he notes many also have a tri-level structure, with local associations in a provincial umbrella and a larger federal umbrella. He also notes there were at that time very few associations that were affiliates of international NGOs.

=== Association Practices ===
The functions of these associations are characterized by Presthus as the following: recommending appointees to public posts, issuing publications, intervening for the benefit of individual members (a sort of "our man in Ottawa"), hosting annual meetings with important stakeholders, building coalitions with other associations on specific issues, and running an award program, where aligned politicians are given public recognition. How each of these functions may have changed or gone defunct is uncertain, for example, giving awards may have gone out of vogue.

Lobbyists may also pair their interactions with public pressure campaigns. For example, the TransCanada Corporation, when looking to build the Energy East pipeline, launched a campaign trying to generate public interest in the project, while simultaneously lobbying for the pipeline's approval.

Lobbying would classically also include inviting politicians to receptions, gatherings at a private venue or a room rented within the legislature where food or drinks may be served, and lobbyists for the group are able to make a speech or interact with politicians or staffers who attend.

Lobbying often has a goal of facilitating knowledge transfer. Many targets of lobbying may be unaware of statistics, anecdotes or trends that the organization that is lobbying is aware of. In this way, academics sometimes conceptualize lobbyists as experts who inform public policy making and play a key role in improving the ability of legislators to effectively legislate. An example of this might be the insight of an economist working for a non-profit that pursues the non-profit's interest (improving welfare for less well-off Canadians), by providing expertise on how the Canadian government can most efficiently increase resources in the welfare system in response to COVID-19. This can however create the risk of a revolving door, where people may move between government to industry groups, giving too much insight into the government process and which arguments to make to shape policy, necessitating revolving door legislation like that currently found in the Lobbying Act. In the 1970s, a near majority of bureaucrats described lobbying as important to their work in policy making, with only 40% saying it played little or no role.

The majority of lobbying meetings are taken either by civil servants or members of parliament. Government ministers do receive a sizeable amount of lobbying, more than the average member of parliament or senator.

=== Association Finances ===
The funding of associations was traditionally dues based, but there was traditional variation that likely continues to this day, with religious and welfare interest groups more likely to be funded by donations than dues, industrial associations more likely to be funded by dues, and with some educational interest groups or others receiving government funds through grants. Some alternative forms of funding may have existed, with Presthus noting that companies were using trade booth space at conventions as a revenue stream. He also noted that membership in these associations was generally affordable, a majority of non-industry associations had dues of under $100 (1970 nominal) per year, and a majority of industry associations were under $2000 per year. Most expenditures are spent in-house, presumably largely on staff, as a majority of association budgets were under $150,000. At that time, executive directors were well-paid on average, with approximately two-thirds of them being in the top earnings decile, with some variation by sector.

=== Association Staff ===
Staff were noted to generally have deep subject matter, with approximately 40% of lobbyists having spent 10 years or more in the association or the industry. Ethnic interest groups were less likely to have this configuration and were more likely to have volunteers rather than full-time paid staff.

Conceptualizing the political power of these organizations is difficult, but Presthus generally characterizes them as transactional, having political capital to spend, and spend most of their time building that capital. Statistically, meetings with MPs were a major activity of associations, with industry associations having the most significant number of meetings, at a statistically significant level. Efficacy of this gathering of capital could be measured by "psychopolitical" ratings, how the lobbyists are perceived by politicians. When asked to self-assess what politicians thought of them in the 1960s and 1970s, slightly more than half of lobbyists believed they had good levels of this ratings, with only labour leaders rating themselves low, despite being the best funded on average.
