= CPP Investments =

Canadian pension fund manager

Canada Pension Plan Investment Board
- Trade name: CPP Investments
- Type: Crown corporation
- Industry: Asset management
- Founded: December 31, 1997; 28 years ago
- Headquarters: 141 Bay Street, Suite 3100, Toronto, Ontario, Canada
- Key people: Dean A. Connor (chairperson); John Graham (CEO)
- AUM: ▲CA$866.2 Billion (September 30, 2026)
- Owner: Government of Canada
- Website: www.cppinvestments.com

The Canada Pension Plan Investment Board (CPPIB; French: Office d'investissement du régime de pensions du Canada), operating as CPP Investments (French: Investissements RPC), is a Canadian Crown corporation established by way of the 1997 Canada Pension Plan Investment Board Act to oversee and invest the funds contributed to and held by the Canada Pension Plan (CPP).

CPP Investments is one of the world's largest investors in private equity, having invested over US$28.1 billion between 2010 and 2014 alone. Despite being a Crown corporation, CPPIB is not considered a sovereign wealth fund because it operates at arm's length from the Government of Canada and solely manages CPP contributions paid by workers and employers, not public funds.

As of September 30, 2026, CPP Investments had net assets of CA$866.2 billion, up from CA$714.4 billion at the end of fiscal 2025. It reported C$56.9 billion in net income, a 7.8 percent net return for fiscal 2026, and an 8.8 percent annualized net return over the preceding 10 years.

CPP Investments is one of Canada's top eight pension funds, nicknamed the "Maple 8" or "Maple Revolutionaries."

== History ==
The Canada Pension Plan was established in 1966. For much of its history, the plan relied on contributions to pay benefits. By 1996, the federal government had determined that the CPP as then constituted was unsustainable. Changes were made to the plan, gradually increasing the contribution rate to its current 9.9% and creating the CPP Investment Board.

Under the direction of then Minister of Finance Paul Martin, the CPP Investment Board was created by an Act of Parliament in 1997 as an independent, but accountable, body to monitor the funds held by the Canada Pension Plan. The CPP Investment Board began its investing program in 1999, establishing the CPP Reserve Fund to hold investment earnings and CPP contributions not needed to pay current pensions. It reports quarterly to the public on its performance, has a professional board of directors to oversee the operations of the CPP reserve fund, and also to plan changes in direction. As a Crown corporation, the CPP Investment Board is accountable to Parliament and reports annually through the Minister of Finance. While accountable to Parliament, the CPP Investment Board is not controlled by the government or subject to government appointments, its employees and directors are not part of the Public Service of Canada. CPPIB is a partner of the World Economic Forum.

== Mandate ==
The CPP Investment Board's mandate is laid out in its founding legislation, the Canada Pension Plan Investment Board Act (S.C. 1997, c. 40). Its sole investing mandate is to achieve a "maximum rate of return, without undue risk of loss".

== Investments ==
The CPP Investment Board invests in private equity, public companies, and both residential and commercial real estate in major cities around the world. It also invests in real estate equities and real estate investment trusts (REITs). CPPIB made its first direct office investment in Seattle in 2016. Notable investments include 50% of the American pet store chain Petco, 50% of American luxury department store chain Neiman Marcus, 50% of Australian office tower development International Towers Sydney, 50.01% of the Ontario Highway 407 toll highway, 21.5% of South Korean discount store chain Homeplus, and 19.8% of multinational media corporation Entertainment One. Other prominent investments are made in Indian companies Byju's, Delhivery, Embassy Office Parks, Eruditus, Power Grid Corporation of India, SBI Life Insurance Company etc.

As outlined in its Policy on Responsible Investing, first adopted in 2005, the Board considers environmental, social and governance (ESG) issues/factors from a risk/return point of view and encourages companies to adopt policies and practices that enhance long-term financial performance.

=== Future and direction ===
John Graham is the current Chief Executive Officer of the CPPIB, replacing Mark Machin on February 26, 2021. Mark Machin resigned after traveling to the United Arab Emirates to receive a COVID-19 vaccine. Prior to Machin, Mark Wiseman was CEO until June 13, 2016.

According to the 2013 Annual Report, about 63% of the fund's assets were invested outside Canada, largely in the United States, Europe and Asia. In addition, the CPPIB announced it was broadening the scope of its investments to include emerging markets, although David Denison, CEO at the time, would not pinpoint a specific country or area. "Canada as a single market cannot accommodate the future growth of our organization," said Denison. In 2023, 86% of the fund's assets were outside Canada, the majority, in the US (36%), with 26% in Asia, 18% in Europe, 14% in Canada, and 6% in Latin America.

In recent years, the CPPIB changed direction in its investment philosophy. It evolved from investing exclusively in non-marketable government bonds to passive index-fund strategies and, in 2006, to active investment strategies.

== Growth and strategy ==
The CPP total assets are projected to reach the following levels according to the 2021 actuarial report: (in assets):

- $671 billion by 2025.
- $991 billion by 2030.
- $1,959 billion by 2040.
- $3,562 billion by 2050.

The strategies used to achieve these targets are:

- Diversification. In 1997, the CPP fund was 100% invested in government bonds, but it has since diversified not only by asset class, but also internationally.
- Employing basic asset allocation theories, with diversification of investments as one of the objectives.
  - The asset mix has evolved over the years as follows:

Asset	2008 mix	2013 mix	2018 mix	2023 mix
Public Equity	51.8%	32.1%	38.8%	24.0%
Fixed Income	25.6%	33.3%	17.4%	12.0%
Private Equity	10.9%	18.1%	20.3%	33.0%
Real Assets	11.7%	16.5%	23.5%	09.0%
Credit	n/a	n/a	n/a	13.0%
Infrastructure	n/a	n/a	n/a	09.0%

- The global regional mix has evolved over the years as well:

Region	2018 mix	2023 mix
Asia-Pacific	23.5%	26%
Canada	15.1%	14%
Europe	18.8%	18%
Latin America	3.5%	6%
USA	37.9%	36%
Other	1.2%	

- Using equity firms to assist in achieving targets for each asset class. The CPP reserve fund allocates certain amounts to various pre-qualified equity firms to be managed and used towards reaching the growth targets. For example, the CPP Investment Board hires private equity firms to help it invest in private companies, fund managers to help it invest in public equities, bond managers to assist in investing in bonds (within Canada and foreign bonds), and so forth.

== Significant transactions ==
CPPIB, as part of a consortium, first invested US$300 million in Skype in September 2009. In May 2011, CPPIB sold its stake in Skype to Microsoft for US$1.1 Bn before debt repayment, or US$933 million. In 2009, CPPIB also invested in the $5.2-billion purchase of IMS Health with Texas Pacific Group and the $2.1-billion purchase of Macquarie Communications Group.

In 2011, the CPPIB managed to increase net assets by 18%, from $129 billion to $153 billion, despite weakness in stock markets. The increase was due to the fund's private equity holdings and real estate portfolio.

In 2012, CPPIB acquired a 45% stake in ten shopping centers and two redevelopment sites from Westfield Group. CPPIB's equity investment was $1.8 billion and the total gross value of the properties was $4.8 billion.

In November 2013, then President and CEO, Mark Wiseman, announced a commercial real estate venture in India with Shapoorji Pallonji. CPPIB would own 80% of the US$200 million venture.

In May 2015, Unibail-Rodamco revealed it had signed an agreement with the Canada Pension Plan Investment Board to sell its 46.1 percent stake in German shopping mall operator MFI AG for €394 million. The same month, the sale of a joint 70% investment with BC Partners in U.S. cable television operator Suddenlink for over US$9 Bn to Altice was also announced. The interest had been acquired in a 2012 leveraged buyout. In June, CPPIB announced it would acquire GE Capital's private equity lending portfolio for $12 billion. In July, citing strong population growth as the reason, CPPIB announced it was investing in rental housing with Minto Group. CPPIB acquired a 60% ownership interest worth $105 million in Minto High Park Village, a multifamily residential rental property with 750 units in Toronto. Peter Ballon stated, "This marks our first direct investment in Canadian multifamily real estate. With strong population growth and solid rental demand, Toronto is one of the top rental markets in Canada and a key strategic market for us in this sector." In October, CPPIB announced plans to acquire Encana's Denver-Julesberg Basin Colorado oil and gas assets for $900 million (US). The deal, with Denver-based partner, private equity firm The Broe Group, having a 5% share in the new Crestone Peak Resources partnership, was completed in July 2016. Broe will manage the portfolio of more than 1600 wells. In November, CPPIB and CVC Capital Partners acquired American pet supplier Petco in a deal worth $4.6 billion.

In March 2016, Brookfield Corporation, the British Columbia Investment Management Corporation (BCI), Qatar Investment Authority, and Qube, a group that includes CPPIB, made a joint $6B bid for Australian port operator Asciano. In July, CPPIB and Calgary-based Wolf Midstream Inc. purchased a 50% stake in Devon Energy's Access Pipeline located in Alberta. In September, CPPIB and Cinven acquired the business-to-business accommodation wholesaler Hotelbeds for a purchase price of around €1.3 billion.

In October 2019, CPPIB announced to invest alongside KKR in acquiring stake in German Axel Springer SE. CPPIB's financial commitment will be at least €500 million. In November 2019, it was reported in India that CPPIB and Brookfield Corporation were seeking to buy out the stakes of other investors into India's largest green power company, ReNew Energy Global. Brookfield, was looking to buy out Abu Dhabi Investment Authority, and CPPIB bought out Goldman Sachs in 2023 to become the majority owner.

In January 2021, CPPIB and Greystar announced they were partnering to pursue multifamily real estate development opportunities in the United States. Greystar, the largest apartment owner in the United States with over 108,500 units, teamed up with Ottawa-based Minto Apartment Real Estate Investment Trust also in 2021. In December, Peter Ballon, then Managing Director and Global Head of Real Estate, announced a 95% stake in an US$840 million alliance with Greystar to develop and acquire purpose-built single-family rental communities in the United States.

In November 2022, CPPIB bought Brookfield Corporation's portfolio of Indian road assets for $1.2 billion.

CPPIB pledged up to $30 million to plant trees in Brazil, in August 2023. In December, CPPIB Credit Investments III Inc., teamed up with Blackstone's BREDS and BREIT, and Rialto Capital Management, to take over 2,600 mostly performing loans from a failed bank. The loans were on market rate multifamily, retail and office properties primarily located in the New York metropolitan area.

In 2024, CPPIB Credit Investments Inc. announced a US$750 million partnership with Redwood Trust, Inc., into residential mortgage assets, and a joint venture with Kennedy Wilson to develop a single-family rental housing in the United Kingdom. A Bloomberg report revealed Canadian pension funds lost $1.24 trillion on their real estate holdings in fiscal 2024. CPPIB reported a 5% loss, while the Public Sector Pension Investment Board (PSPIB) lost 16%. By February 2024, CPPIB had sold its stakes in three commercial properties at discounted prices: a Santa Monica property at a 75% discount for its share purchased in 2018; two towers in Vancouver for 20% less than what it was valued in 2023; and, its share in a Manhattan office building for $1.

In January 2025, CPPIB announced a 95% stake in a $500 million joint rental-housing venture in Korea with Mangrove (MGRV); an equal partnership with Cyrela Brazil Realty to develop residential condominiums in São Paulo, Brazil; and, sold its 49% stake in a retail and residential development in China, with Longfor Properties. Also in January, The Globe & Mail reported Brookfield Corporation had bought the stakes of partners CPPIB and Alberta Investment Management Corporation (AIMCo) in the Maritime Life Building in Toronto which had been listed twice in three years without attracting a suitable offer. The transaction occurred before the end December 2024. Net proceeds from the sale were C$107 million. In December, it was announced CPPIB would invest up to US$1.05 billion for an indirect stake in Castrol as part of a transaction led by Stonepeak to acquire a majority controlling interest from BP. The transaction values Castrol at an enterprise value of approximately US$10.1 billion and is subject to regulatory approvals, with completion expected by the end of 2026.

== Performance ==
The performance and the market value of the CPP Fund is reported on a quarterly basis.

Investments held by the CPP Fund include equities, fixed income (primarily government bonds), and inflation-sensitive assets (real estate, inflation-linked bonds and infrastructure). The CPPIB is making a major push into real estate, especially real estate in India.

Historical information on the performance of assets available to the Canada Pension Plan, and financial statements of the CPP Investment Board, can be found under the Quarterly Reports and Annual Reports section of the CPPIB's website.

The total growth of the CPP Reserve Fund is derived from the CPP contributions of working Canadians, and the return on investment of the contributions. The portion of CPP Reserve Fund growth due to CPP contributions varies from year to year, but have shown a slight decrease in the past 3 years. The historical growth with the investment performance is tabulated as follows:

Year	Net Asset Value (CAD, March 31)	Rate of Return (annual) (Note: Commencing in fiscal 2007, the rate of return reflects the performance of the CPP Fund which excludes the short-term cash required to pay current benefits.)
2003	$55.6 Billion	-1.1%
2004	$70.5 Billion	+10.3%
2005	$81.3 Billion	+8.5%
2006	$98.0 Billion	+15.5%
2007	$116.6 Billion	+12.9%
2008 (Note: Increased fund value due to worker and employer CPP contributions not needed to pay current benefits. The negative investment return amounted to $303 million CAD.)	$122.7 Billion	-0.29%
2009	$105.5 Billion	-18.6%
2010	$127.6 Billion	+14.9%
2011	$148.2 Billion	+11.9%
2012	$161.6 Billion	+6.6%
2013	$183.3 Billion	+10.1%
2014	$219.1 Billion	+16.5%

Year	Net Asset Value (CAD, March 31)	Rate of Return (annual)
2015	$264.6 Billion	+18.7%
2016	$278.9 Billion	+3.4%
2017	$316.7 Billion	+11.8%
2018	$356.1 Billion	+8.0%
2019	$392.0 Billion	+11.1%
2020	$409.6 Billion	+9.9%
2021	$497.2 Billion	+20.4%
2022	$539.3 Billion	+6.8%
2023	$570.0 Billion	+1.3%
2024	$632.3 Billion	+8.0%
2025	$714.4 Billion	+9.3%
2026	$793.3 Billion	+7.8%

=== Board of directors ===
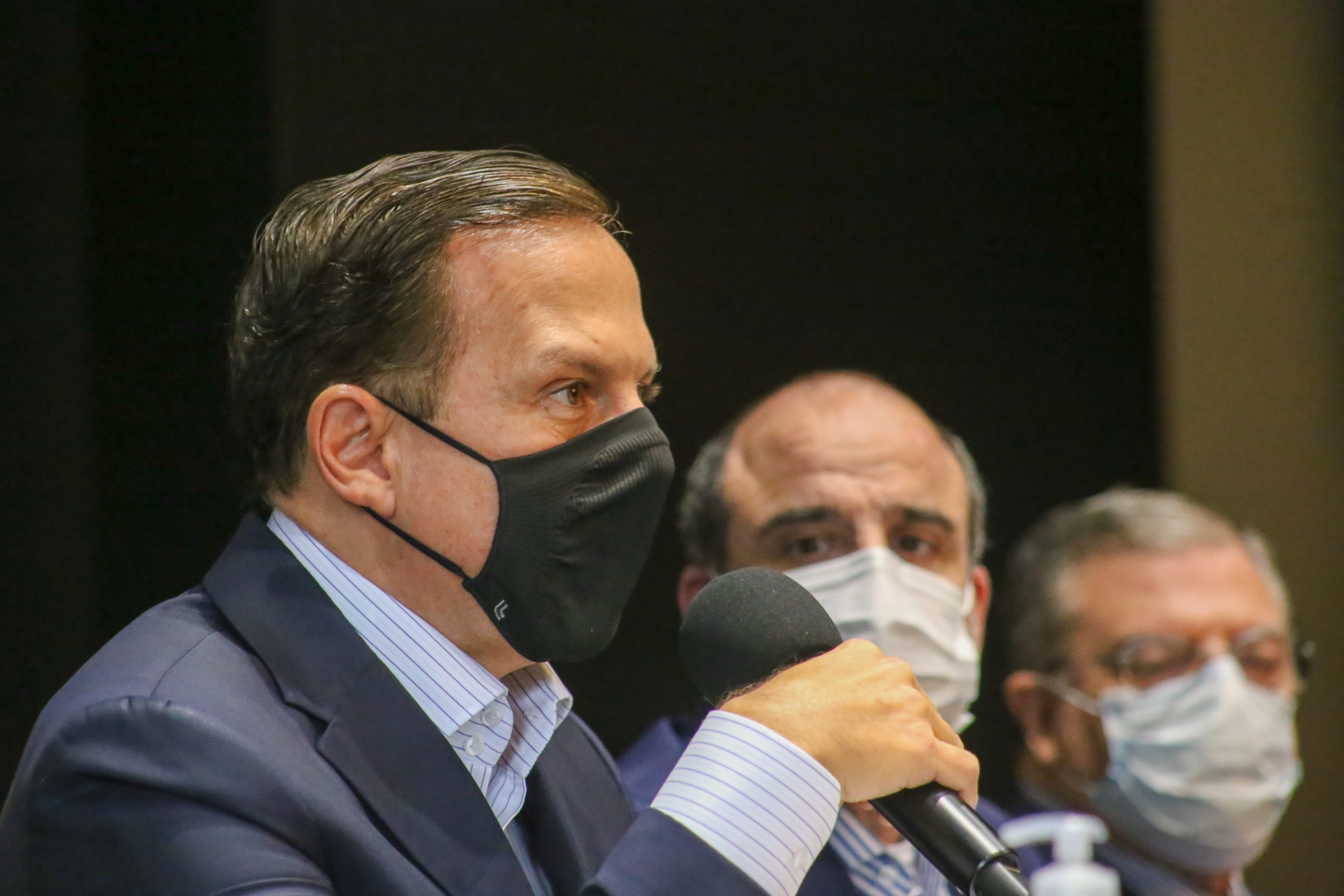
João Doria, Governor of São Paulo, meets with the Canada Pension Plan Investment Board (December 2020).

- Dean A. Connor
- Elizabeth Cannon
- Sylvia Chrominska
- Stephanie Coyles
- Gillian (Jill) Denham
- William 'Mark' Evans
- Ashleigh Everett
- Elio Luongo
- John Montalbano
- Barry Perry
- Mary Phibbs
- Boon Sim

== Criticism ==
In 2009, executives of the Canada Pension Plan Investment Board took a 31.4% cut in their bonuses after questions were raised about the level of compensation at the crown corporation.

As worldwide concern for global climate change implications increasingly call on institutional divestment from fossil fuels, CPPIB has also been criticized for failing to do so, both on climate grounds and financial loss.

CPPIB and other institutional investors involved in rental housing and REITs, have been blamed for rising rents and evictions, and hailed for increasing and renovating supply, in Canada and abroad. The financialization of housing has become a prominent political debate in Canada. In 2022, then Prime Minister Justin Trudeau promised to address the issue with new tax policy but abandoned this idea in May 2024.

In May 2019, Conservative MP Tom Kmiec (Calgary Shepard) criticized the CPPIB during a meeting of the Canadian House of Commons Standing Committee on Finance for its indirect investments in two Chinese firms, Hikvision and Dahua Technology, which supply surveillance technology to the Chinese government used to repress Uyghurs in China's western Xinjiang region. CPPIB CEO Mark Machin stated that the holdings are part of indices which CPPIB invests in and that those investments had been red-flagged for potential future divestment.

The firm's former CEO Mark Machin resigned following a controversy surrounding his choice to receive the COVID-19 vaccine in the United Arab Emirates, whilst Canada was still struggling to acquire vaccines.

CPPIB has received criticism surrounding the selection of its performance targets. In fiscal year 2025, it adopted a new set of benchmark portfolios claimed to better reflect their investment strategies. However, CPPIB missed these targets in fiscal years 2025 and 2026. Critics raised governance concerns upon noting that, combined with an updated compensation plan, this resulted in increased bonuses for staff and executives.

== See also ==
- Caisse de dépôt et placement du Québec
- Public Sector Pension Investment Board
- OMERS
