= Brigitte Shim =

Canadian architect

- Born: December 8, 1958 (age 67); Kingston, Jamaica
- Occupation: Architect
- Practice: Shim-Sutcliffe Architects
- Website: www.shim-sutcliffe.com

Brigitte Shim, FRAIC, OC, RCA, Hon. FAIA, OAA (December 8, 1958) is a Canadian architect and a founding partner of Shim-Sutcliffe Architects, established in 1994 with her husband, Howard Sutcliffe. She is also a professor at the John H. Daniels Faculty of Architecture, Landscape, and Design, University of Toronto. Shim and Sutcliffe formed Shim-Sutcliffe Architects to pursue their shared interest in the interrelation of architecture, landscape, interior design, and industrial design. Over the last 30 years, the firm has completed projects for public, private, non-profit, and residential clients.

== Education and Early Career ==
Born in Kingston, Jamaica, in 1958, Shim’s family immigrated to Canada in 1965. She began her post secondary education at the University of Waterloo, graduating with a degree in environmental studies in 1981. Upon completion of her first degree, she enrolled in architecture at Waterloo, graduating in 1983. It was also at the University of Waterloo where she met Sutcliffe and the couple began working on projects together.

Between 1981 and 1987, Shim worked in the offices of Arthur Erickson and Baird Sampson Neuert Architects, before launching her academic career in 1988, accepting a teaching position at the University of Toronto. That same year, Shim and Sutcliffe completed their first notable built project, Garden Pavilion and Reflecting Pool, a concrete and steel structure located in Toronto’s Don Mills neighbourhood.

== Professorship ==
Shim joined the John H. Daniels Faculty of Architecture, Landscape and Design, University of Toronto in 1988, where she remains a tenured professor. The courses that Shim teaches range from core, advanced, and thesis design studios, to more specialized courses that explore her areas of expertise, like History and Theory of Landscape Architecture, or studies in laneway housing and urban intensification.

Shim’s other notable academic appointments include:

- Eero Saarinen Visiting Professor of Architectural Design, Yale University School of Architecture (2005, 2010, 2014)
- Invited International Visiting Professor, Ecole d’Architecture, École Polytechnique Fédérale de Lausanne (2002)
- Canadian Bicentennial Visiting Professor at Yale University (2001)
- Visiting Professor, Department of Architecture, Harvard University (1993, 1996)

== Involvement in Architecture Community ==
Throughout her career, Shim has been a member of committees, locally and internationally, dedicated to the advancement of urban design and advocacy within the industry. She was a member of the architectural advisory board of Canada’s National Capital Commission for 8 years, is an active member of Waterfront Toronto’s Design Review Panel, and has been a member of both the Master Jury and Steering Committee of the Aga Khan Award for Architecture.

She is a Fellow of the Royal Architectural Institute of Canada (FRAIC) as well as an Honorary Fellow of the American Institute of Architects (Hon. FAIA).

== Awards ==
Beyond the awards earned by Shim-Sutcliffe Architects as a firm, Shim herself has been honoured with several accolades that recognize her work in the field of architecture and design over the course of her career.

- Royal Architecture Institute of Canada Gold Medal (2021)
- Invested Member of the Order of Canada (2013)
- Recipient of The Queen Elizabeth Diamond Jubilee Medal (2013)
- Association of Chinese Canadian Entrepreneurs Lifetime Achievement Award (2022)
