= Healthcare of Ontario Pension Plan =

Major Canadian pension fund

- Type: Private
- Industry: Pension fund
- Founded: January 1, 1960; 66 years ago
- Headquarters: Toronto, Ontario, Canada
- Total assets: ▲ C$130 billion (2026)
- Number of employees: ▲1,000 (2023)
- Website: hoopp.com

The Healthcare of Ontario Pension Plan (HOOPP) is a Canadian institutional investor that manages a multi-employer defined pension plan for healthcare workers in Ontario. It manages pension investments on behalf of its 460,000 members and 670 participating employers. HOOPP invests in a variety of asset classes, including fixed income, public equities, credit, private equity, real estate, and infrastructure.

As of December 2023, HOOPP's net assets reached C$112.6 billion, making it one of Canada's largest pensions by assets under management. HOOPP is headquartered in Toronto, Ontario, Canada, but also operates an office in London, United Kingdom. HOOPP is one of Canada's top eight pension funds, nicknamed the "Maple 8" or "Maple Revolutionaries."

HOOPP has a reputation for applying principles of investment that are intended to be socially responsible (such as avoidance of tobacco and firearms investments), while still maintaining strong returns. However, HOOPP has been accused by Danish and Dutch tax authorities of engaging in substantial dividend stripping schemes during the 2010s. (HOOPP denied those allegations.)

== History ==
HOOPP was founded in 1960 by the Ontario Hospital Association with the participation of 71 hospitals as the Hospitals of Ontario Pension Plan. It was originally founded to provide a defined benefit pension plan to hospitals and its workers.

In 1993, HOOPP became an independent trust, which is its current organizational structure.

In 2010, HOOPP's name was changed into the present form, the Healthcare of Ontario Pension Plan.

Starting in 2025, HOOPP plans to allow self-employed Ontario-based doctors to participate in the fund.

== Organization ==
HOOPP is a private non-for-profit trust fund, governed by a board of trustees composed of sixteen voting members. Eight trustees are selected from the Ontario Hospital Association. The remaining eight are appointed by the Ontario Nurses' Association, Canadian Union of Public Employees, Ontario Public Service Employees Union, and SEIU Healthcare. These trustees oversee the administration of the HOOPP plan and the management of the assets.

== Strategy ==
HOOPP uses a liability driven investing approach that includes a large allocation to bonds. However, HOOPP plans to expand private equity and infrastructure allocations in the future. According to HOOPP, 45% of its investments are made outside of Canada, with major investments in the United States, Europe, Asia–Pacific regions.

In 2019, Danish tax authority Skattestyrelsen alleged that HOOPP improperly received 894 million kr. in tax rebates from 2011 to 2014, in addition to other rebates that were refused by the tax authority before being paid out. Skattestyrelsen determined that when HOOPP was not the beneficial owner of a stock, HOOPP did not meet the criteria to avoid the 27% tax on dividends. Commenting to DR, taxation professor Jan Pedersen said that this was "an exploitation of the tax system" wherein the participants tried to give the impression that one was the formal owner of an asset, when another was the actual beneficial owner. These dividend stripping activities do not rise to the level of fraud, unlike others being alleged contemporaneously against other pension funds by Danish authorities.

In 2025, a tax court in the Netherlands found that the pension fund had wrongly claimed €213.5 million in tax refunds attributable to 445 separate transactions from 2013 to 2018, and was thus obligated to repay that amount plus interest. The judgment upheld the conclusion of the tax authorities, who had determined that HOOPP's dividend stripping arrangements meant that it was not the beneficial owner of the securities, and thus not entitled to the refund of the 15% tax on dividends normally enjoyed by foreign pension funds under Netherlands law. HOOPP expressed its intention to appeal. The Netherlands Public Prosecution Service and the fiscal regulator (FIOD) had also launched a criminal investigation into the matter.

== Significant transactions ==
In 2018, Chobani announced that HOOPP would be acquiring TPG Capital's minority equity stake in the company, giving HOOPP a 20% equity stake. Terms of the transaction are unknown, however, the stake was originally acquired by TPG for $750 million.

In 2019, HOOPP acquired a minority stake in Herschel Supply Co. for an undisclosed amount.

In 2022, HOOPP and AustralianSuper acquired a 45% stake in Greencross from TPG Capital, valuing the company at $3.5 billion.

== See also ==
- CPP Investments
- Public Sector Pension Investment Board
- Ontario Teachers' Pension Plan
- OMERS
