= BBG-1 =

BBG-1 is a ship's pennant number (hull number) and may refer to:

- USS Kentucky (BBG-1) (ex-BB-66), a cancelled U.S. Navy missile battleship
- USS Defiant (BBG-1), a proposed U.S. Navy guided-missile battleship

== See also ==
- BBG (disambiguation)
- BBGI
- BG1
