= British Columbia Investment Management Corporation =

Canadian pension fund manager

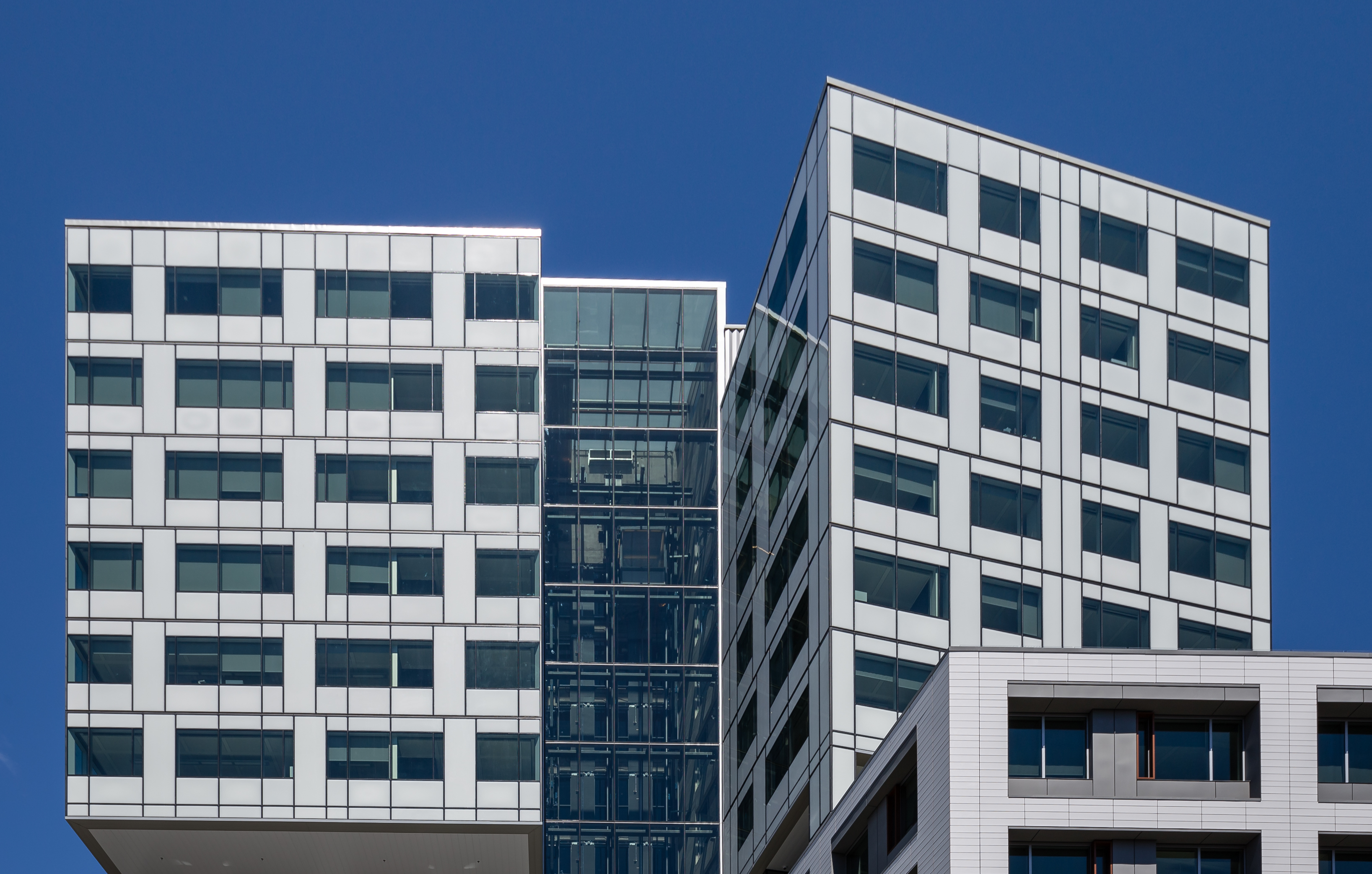
- Headquarters at 750 Pandora
- Trade name: BCI
- Type: Private
- Industry: Pension fund
- Founded: July 15, 1999; 27 years ago
- Headquarters: Victoria, British Columbia, Canada
- Key people: Peter Milburn (Chairman); Gordon Fyfe (CEO & CIO)
- AUM: CA$233 billion (March 2023)
- Number of employees: 711 (March 2023)
- Subsidiaries: QuadReal Property Group
- Website: www.bci.ca

British Columbia Investment Management Corporation which uses the trade name BCI, is a Canadian company established by way of the 1999 Public Sector Pension Plans Act to provide investment services to British Columbia’s public sector pensions plans. It invests in multiple asset classes which are in both public and private markets. The majority of its investments are in North America.

BCI is one of Canada's top eight pension funds, nicknamed "The Maple 8" or "Maple Revolutionaries."

== Background ==
On July 15, 1999, the Legislature of British Columbia created BCI to provide investment management services to British Columbia's public sector pension plans and other Crown entities through the 1999 Public Sector Pension Plans Act. It started by managing assets previously managed by British Columbia's Ministry of Finance. BCI was modeled after other Canadian pension plan investment managers such as Caisse de dépôt et placement du Québec.

In July 2016, BCI formed QuadReal Property Group to manage real estate investments. This was in line with other Canadian pension plan investment managers which also had their own real estate investment arms.

== Significant Transactions ==
In June 2016, BCIMC announced that it would stop outsourcing the management of its real estate properties and create an in-house real estate investment and property management company: QuadReal. In February 2017, BCI sold its Vancouver-based SilverBirch chain of 26 hotels, days after one of its subsidiaries announced plans to buy Oakridge Centre.

BCI was listed in the Paradise Papers in November 2017. BCI and its related companies were in the database, including a company registered in Bermuda.

In June 2018, CBC News reported that more than $3 billion of BCI's investments were in the top 200 publicly traded oil and gas companies according to a report. This was in contrast to Canada's commitment Paris Agreement that aimed to tackle climate change. The report stated BCI's investments in fossil fuel companies were "both a moral failing and a financial risk" and that BCI should divest from them and reinvest in more sustainable companies. A spokesperson of BCI stated that BCI looked at investments that generated reliable returns which included companies in the oil and gas industry but that didn't mean it was ignoring the Paris Agreement.

In September 2019, following inquiries from the Financial Post, BCI discovered it had “inadvertently omitted” all of its Canadian holdings from a disclosure it made to the U.S. Securities and Exchange Commission. BCI admitted they had failed to include about US$2.46 billion of investment in 98 companies, primarily across Canada's energy, banking and mining sectors due to a "data filter."

In 2021, BCI's private equity strategy had a one-year return of 29.6% and a five-year return of 21.5%. This was a result of transitioning to direct investments which started in 2016. In the same year, BCI announce it would target CA$5 billion of cumulative investments in sustainability bonds by 2025 as part of its ESG strategy.

In March 2022, BCI stated it would divest from Russian companies in response to the Russian invasion of Ukraine.

In 2022, BCI opened an office in New York. It was also announced that are currently plans to open an office in London by the end of 2023 to expand operations into Europe.

For its 2023 fiscal year, BCI reported a 3.5% return which beat the benchmark of 0.3%. The gains were mainly from private assets which included private equity.

In May 2023, due to rising tensions between Canada and China, BCI paused all further investments in China.

In July 2023, Thames Water, a water utility company in the United Kingdom that BCI and OMERS invested in, was facing regulatory scrutiny and fines for sewage leaks.

Boswell Holdings, a company indirectly controlled by BCI, acquired BBGI for circa £1.06 billion (US$1.33 billion) in May 2025.
