= Maple Eight =

Largest Canadian pension funds

In Canada, the Maple Eight are the eight largest pension funds. The investment approach used by the Maple-8 is known globally as the 'Canadian model', in which they utilize a direct investment approach and internally manage their own assets and portfolios. Collectively, as of March 2026, the pension funds control approximately CA$2.7 trillion in assets under management (AUM), and they are heavily influential in Canadian and global investment markets.

== The Maple-8 members ==
Pension plan	Acronym	Est.	Sponsor	Crown corporation	AUM (CA$; billions)
Canada Pension Plan Investment Board	CPPIB	1997	Government of Canada and provincial governments	Yes	$866.2 (September 2026)
Caisse de dépôt et placement du Québec	CDPQ	1965	Government of Quebec	Yes	$517.3 (December 2025)
Public Sector Pension Investment Board	PSP	1999	Government of Canada	Yes	$320.6 (March 2026)
British Columbia Investment Management Corporation	BCI	1999	Government of British Columbia	Yes	$313.7 (March 2026)
Ontario Teachers' Pension Plan	OTPP	1990	Government of Ontario and Ontario Teachers' Federation	No	$279.4 (December 2025)
Alberta Investment Management Corporation	AIMCo	2008	Government of Alberta	Yes	$210.7 (Note: The $210.7 billion (June 2026) managed by AIMCo includes (at that date) the $31.9 billion Alberta Heritage Savings Trust Fund – a sovereign wealth fund which is funded from the province's non-renewable resource ownership – not by employee/employer pension contributions and not used for ongoing pension plans.) (June 2026)
Ontario Municipal Employees Retirement System	OMERS	1962	Various government agencies and unions in Ontario	No	$145.2 (December 2025)
Healthcare of Ontario Pension Plan	HOOPP	1960	Ontario Hospital Association and unions	No	$131.9 (December 2025)

== History ==
In 1986, when the Government of Ontario sought to improve its public sector pension plans, investment strategist Keith Ambachtsheer recommended Peter Drucker's model, as outlined in his 1976 book, "The Unseen Revolution”.

Drucker posited creating a more diversified, globally oriented investment portfolio, handled by hired, not appointed, non-political professionals who received competitive remuneration, would lead to higher returns. The Ontario Teachers' Pension Plan was the first to adopt the model in 1990. In 2012, then president of the Canada Pension Plan Investment Board, David Denison, stated:

Canada’s system was ranked fifth best in the world in the Mercer Global Pension Index study for 2011. In truth, Canada’s high ranking has more to do with the woeful state of many other countries’ retirement systems than the robustness of our own.

He added that there was room for improvement but the Maple-8's sophisticated, in-house investment model saved money. In 2017, Ambachtsheer stated that the costs are average but the Canadian model generates a higher 10-year return compared to other funds. At a 2024 symposium, OMERS president, Blake Hutcheson, stated the top Canadian pensions were not a monolith, as suggested by the term 'Maple-8,' and each investment board was unique.

In 2025, Mercer ranked Canada's system at 17th with a B-rating, down from 12th in 2023.

The term 'Maple-8' evolved from an article in The Economist titled "Maple Revolutionaries" which originally discussed the Top Ten pension plans in Canada. Due to their size, the Ontario Pension Board (OPB) and OPSEU Pension Trust (OPTrust) are not included in the Maple Eight, at 2025 Assets Under Management of $36.6B and $27.2B, respectively .

In November 2025, Prime Minister Mark Carney signed an investment agreement with the United Arab Emirates, and stated representatives of Canadian pension funds, with their $2 trillion in capital, would visit the UAE in 2026 to deepen existing partnerships in sectors such as energy, infrastructure, and AI.

== Canadian allocations ==
There has been much focus on the Maple-8's allocation to Canadian investments. Although the federal government is not involved in the operation or investment strategies of these funds, they have expressed a desire to allot more capital to Canadian investments, with suggestions of a minimum allocation. Pensions argue that their global investment strategies allow them to stabilize their returns, discovering alpha in other markets and hedge against any volatility in the Canadian market, while bringing international capital into Canada.

Pension Plan	CAN. Exposure
Canada Pension Plan Investment Board	12%
Public Sector Pension Investment Board	21%
Caisse de depot et placement du Quebec	27%
Alberta Investment Management Corp.	42%
British Columbia Investment Management Corp.	29%
Ontario Teachers' Pension Plan	35%
Healthcare of Ontario Pension Plan	55%
Ontario Municipal Employees Retirement System	21%
