= BBG =

BBG may refer to:

== Businesses and organisations ==
- Billabong (clothing), Australian Stock Exchange symbol
- B'nai B'rith Girls, the women's order of B'nai B'rith Youth Organization
- Board of Broadcast Governors, forerunner to the Canadian Radio-television and Telecommunications Commission from 1958 to 1968
- Bradford & Bingley, a bank in the UK
- British business group, an association or club of expatriate British business people
- U.S. Agency for Global Media (formerly Broadcasting Board of Governors)

== Places ==
- BBG Academy, a high school in Yorkshire, England, UK
- Baseball Ground, a stadium in Derby, England, UK (1890–2003)
- Bay of Bengal Gateway, an international submarine communications cable
- Belize Botanic Gardens, Cayo, Belize
- Bernburg (district), Saxony-Anhalt, Germany (BBG on licence plates)
- Birżebbuġa, Malta (postal code: BBG)
- Branson Airport, Missouri, US (FAA: BBG)
- Brooklyn Botanic Garden, Brooklyn, New York City, NYS, US

== Other uses ==
- Beibehaltungsgenehmigung, a certificate allowing a person to retain German citizenship while also naturalizing as a citizen of another country
- Brilliant Blue G, a type of Coomassie dye
- Browser based game, a mobile game running from a webbrowser
- BBG, the United States Navy hull classification symbol for a Guided Missile Battleship
- Boutros Boutros-Ghali, an Egyptian politician and diplomat

== See also ==
- B2G (disambiguation)
- BG (disambiguation)
