= AIMCo =

Sovereign wealth fund of Alberta, Canada

Alberta Investment Management Corporation
- Type: Crown corporation
- Industry: Asset management
- Founded: January 1, 2008; 18 years ago
- Headquarters: Edmonton, Alberta, Canada
- Key people: Stephen Harper (chairman)
- Revenue: ▲CA$1.15 Billion (March 31, 2025)
- AUM: ▲CA$179.6 Billion (December 31, 2024)
- Owner: Government of Alberta
- Number of employees: 450+
- Divisions: Money Market & Fixed Income; Public Equities; Global Tactical Asset Allocation; Real Estate; Private Equity; Infrastructure & Renewable Resources; Private Debt & Loan; Private Mortgages
- Website: aimco.ca

Alberta Investment Management Corporation (AIMCo) is a Canadian crown corporation and institutional investor owned by the Government of Alberta, established to manage several public funds and pensions, is headquartered in Edmonton, Alberta. AIMCo was established by an act of the Legislative Assembly of Alberta in 2008 under the government of Progressive Conservative Premier Ed Stelmach.

AIMCo manages one of Canada's largest public pools of funds, with assets under management totalling CA$179.6 Billion (December 31, 2024). AIMCo manages the assets on behalf of 375,000 members of provincial public pension and retirement plans, endowments, government funds, and other public accounts, including (at that date) the CA$25.0 Billion Alberta Heritage Savings Trust Fund. (Note: Value of AHSTF at AIMCo fiscal year-end of 31 December 2024. Note that this will differ from AHSTF's own annual report, which uses a fiscal year-end of 31 March 2025, and which will be itself reduced to account for funds to be immediately transferred, at the start of the 2024–25 fiscal year, from the AHSTF to the Government of Alberta for its annual general budgetary expenditures)

AIMCo is one of Canada's top eight pension funds, nicknamed the "Maple 8" or "Maple Revolutionaries."

== Overview ==
The Alberta Investment Management Corporation (AIMCo) was established on January 1, 2008 as a crown corporation to consolidate and manage Alberta's public sector investments. The Progressive Conservative government introduced the Alberta Investment Management Corporation Act in 2007, aiming to improve investment returns by up to $500 million annually. AIMCo took over $70 billion in assets from the provincial finance department, becoming Canada's fifth-largest investment fund at the time. The provincial government claimed the change would lead to increase in annual return on investments of up to $500 million.

Under the leadership of its first CEO, Leo de Bever, AIMCo quickly made significant investments both domestically and internationally. These included stakes in Spanish pipelines, English waterworks, and Puget Sound Energy in Washington, as well as Canadian companies like KMC Mining Corp and Precision Drilling. By 2015, AIMCo was managing a diverse portfolio of endowment funds, pension plans, government funds, and specialty funds, achieving a 9.1% total fund net return for its clients.

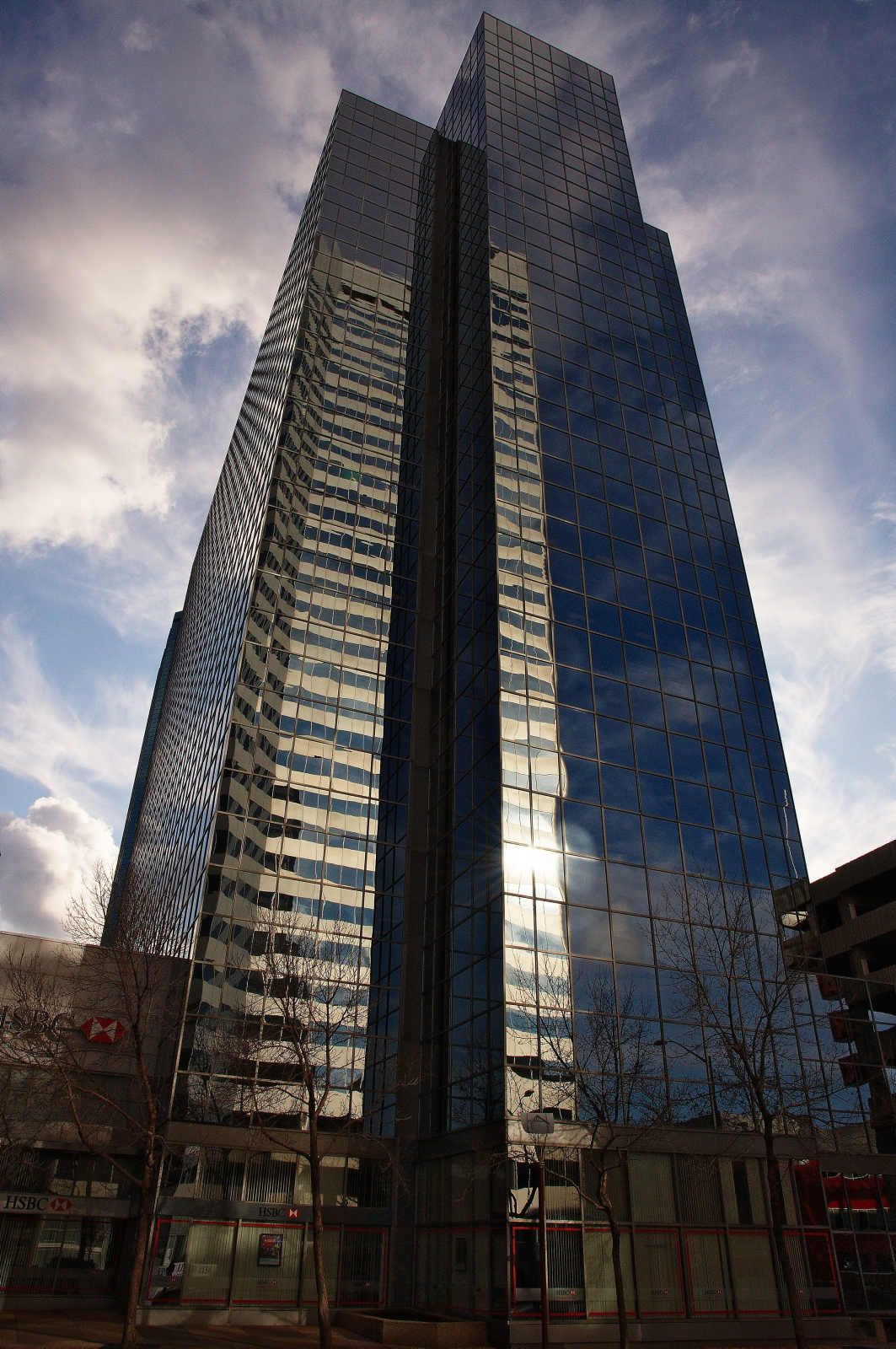
HSBC Place in Edmonton in 2009

AIMCo continued to grow and evolve, purchasing HSBC Place in Edmonton in 2017 to serve as its headquarters. The corporation manages assets for various pension plans, including the Local Authorities Pension Plan (LAPP), its largest client. In 2019, the United Conservative Party government added the Alberta Teachers' Retirement Fund to AIMCo's management portfolio, making it the investment manager for all public sector pensions in Alberta.

By April 2020, AIMCo was managing approximately $119 billion in assets for 375,000 members of provincial public retirement programs and other public accounts, including the $18 billion Heritage Savings Trust Fund. By the end of the 2021 calendar year, AIMCo had $168.3 billion in AUM.

In November 2024, the Alberta government claimed that from 2019 to 2023, AIMCo's total fund return averaged 7.62% annually. The government reported that by the end of 2023 AIMCo had $160.6 billion in assets under management and posted an overall return of 6.9%, which was below its benchmark return of 8.7%. In November 2024, the Alberta government dismissed the AIMCo board of directors, CEO Evan Siddall and other executives and installed former prime minister Stephen Harper as the new chair. Total assets under management in the six-month period ending June 30, 2024, were $168.9 billion.

According to former Board Chair, Kenneth Kroner, the government's report failed to judge AIMCo's performance against client-directed benchmarks, which determine how much of the pension fund's assets were allocated. Kroner argued the pension fund consistently exceeded these benchmarks. While the government cited a 96% rise in third-party fees and a 71% increase in the employee salary, it failed to acknowledge that these were driven by client demand for more investment in illiquid assets, such as real estate and private equity. Additionally, the pension fund's costs remained 23% below industry averages at the time of the report.

== Assets under management ==
The Alberta Investment Management Corporation (AIMCo) has experienced significant growth in its assets under management (AUM) since its inception in 2008. Starting with $75.7 billion in AUM in 2008, AIMCo saw fluctuations in the early years, with a notable drop to $69.0 billion in 2009 due to a 10.1% loss. However, the corporation has shown consistent growth since then, reaching $100 billion in AUM by February 2018 and continuing to expand.

AIMCo's investment performance has varied over the years, with annual returns ranging from 2.3% to 14.7% between 2009 and 2021. Notable years include 2013 with a 12.5% return, 2019 with a 10.6% return, and 2021 with an impressive 14.7% return. The corporation manages a diverse portfolio, which as of 2015 was composed of 43% equities, 22% fixed income, and 35% illiquid assets. By the end of 2019, AIMCo's total AUM had reached $103.7 billion, with $88.2 billion in balanced funds and $15.5 billion in government and specialty funds. By the end of the 2021 calendar year, AIMCo had $168.3 billion in AUM. At the end of 2023 AIMCo had $160.6 billion in assets under management.

== Governance and board of directors ==
In November 2024, former prime minister Stephen Harper was named the new chair of AIMCo.

In 2018, board members included J. Richard Bird as chair, Phyllis Clark, Helen Kearns, Ken Kroner, Jim Prieur, Tom Woods, Sharon Sallows, and Robert Vivian Jr. Talisman Energy's Jackie Sheppard was the newest member, replacing Harold Roozen, who served from 2011 until 2018 when he retired. IBM's Robert "Jay" Vivian Jr. had become a member in 2014 along with Suncor's John Ferguson, and Enbridge's J. Richard Bird. Bird, who retired from Enbridge in 2015, after having served in various executive positions there including as CFO and Executive Vice President, was designated as AIMCo CEO in June 2017—effective on October 21, 2017. Mac Van Wielingen had served as board chair from December 2014 until he stepped down in 2018. Kevin Uebelein was first named as AIMCo CEO to replace outgoing chairman Charles Baillie in 2014. The Lieutenant Governor of Alberta appoints all members of AIMCo's board.

AIMCo was established as a crown corporation by the Province of Alberta to provide independent, arms length investment management services to designated pension funds and provincial public sector bodies and funds, with strong accountability for its investment decisions. According to the Alberta Investment Management Corporation Regulation board members must have demonstrable expertise in areas such as "investment management, finance, accounting or law" or have held senior executive positions. According to AIMCo's 2010/2011 Annual report, the Board of Directors meets six times every year with meetings scheduled one year in advance

AIMCo is headquartered in Edmonton, Alberta with additional offices in Calgary, Toronto, London, Luxembourg, New York City, and Singapore.

== Strategy ==
AIMCo is one of several "pooled investment portfolios" in Canada that allow for "client-controlled asset allocation for multiple public-sector pension plans and investment funds. Through pooled asset management, these entities achieve sufficient scale to produce significant cost savings through internal investment management and access to alternative asset classes." Through funds like these "Canada is emerging as a world-wide leader in successfully adapting the advantages of large funds to the public sector." These are "arm's-length investment management entities with sufficient scale, independent boards and internal investment management, remunerated at rates competitive with the private sector."

=== Responsible Investing (RI) ===
In 2010, AIMCo became a signatory to the United Nations Principles for Responsible Investment, an international network of investors working together to implement its six aspirational principles for a more sustainable global financial system.

The 2018 Canadian Responsible Investment Trends Report, recognized the progress of major Canadian investors like the AIMCo, Canada Pension Plan Investment Board, Ontario Teachers' Pension Plan that are involved in responsible investing recognizing the value of long-term sustainability.

AIMCo's approach to socially responsible investing is governed by its fiduciary duty to clients and a long-term investment horizon while integrating environmental, social and corporate governance (ESG) factors into investment analysis.

AIMCo was one of the 12 investment management firms who co-authored a paper to aid investors in climate-related corporate disclosure. The report was written as part of the Task Force on Climate-related Financial Disclosures, under the umbrella of the Investor Leadership Network.

== Significant transactions ==
In December 2010, in an AIMCo-led private equity investment, it acquired a 50 per cent interest in Chile's Autopista Central's 61-kilometer, six-lane toll highway in Santiago on behalf AIMCo clients. In 2011 AIMCo divested its stake in Autopista Central to Abertis for about 1.5 billion. In the same year, AIMCo, under a landmark transaction, acquired Morgan Stanley Infrastructure Partners 50% interest in the Chilean company from Inversiones Grupo Saesa Limitada (Grupo SAESA). This electricity transmission and distribution company is jointly owned by AIMCo and Ontario Teachers' Pension Plan (OTPP).

In 2012, Stanhope, Mitsui Fudosan UK and AIMCo, on behalf of its clients, completed the purchase of the BBC Television Centre in West London. Construction began in summer of 2015 to develop homes, offices, hotels, retail and leisure facilities within this 13.7-acre area.

In 2016, AIMCo's Infrastructure Private Equity group became the second largest shareholder of Howard Energy Partners, acquiring a 28% stake from EnLink Midstream Partners, LP. This transaction followed AIMCo's initial investment in August 2016 which allowed for the purchase of up to $500 million of Series B preferred units. AIMCo provided loans to companies such as the privately owned Calfrac Well Services, a large hydraulic fracturing company, which entered into a $200 million debt-with-warrants financing agreement. Also in 2016, an AIMCo led consortium of Ontario Municipal Employees Retirement System (OMERS), Ontario Teachers' Pension Plan (OTPP), and Wren House Infrastructure Management Limited (Wren House) acquired the London City Airport.

In 2017, AIMCo, in partnership with MSD Capital and CCMP Capital acquired Hayward Industries in 2017.

AIMCo, in partnership with U.S. based AES Corp. acquired a 100% stake in FTP Power LLC from FirTree Partners for $1.6 billion in cash and debt. This investment gives AIMCo ownership of 150 utility and distributed electrical generation systems across the United States and the United Kingdom, increasing their exposure to green energy globally. Barclays Investment Bank and Citigroup served as co-financial advisors on this transaction. AIMCo, in combination with the Virginia Retirement System successfully recovered $204.5 million after co-leading the class action securities litigation against MF Global, a now defunct broker dealer. AIMCo was advised by Goldman Sachs under a consortium of underwriter defendants. AIMCo alongside long-term infrastructure investors Allianz Capital Partners (ACP) and Hastings Fund Management (Hastings) purchased Porterbrook Rail Finance Limited (Porterbook) for an undisclosed amount. This major rolling stock leasing UK company owns and manages a fleet of approximately 5,900 railway vehicles. AIMCo is still a major stakeholder in this company.

In May 2019, AIMCo announced that it was acquiring an 85 per cent interest in the $1.15 billion 90-kilometre Northern Courier pipeline system owned by the Calgary-based TC Energy's—formerly known as TransCanada Corporation. In a November 4th, 2109 BNN Bloomberg interview with Amanda Lang, Uebelein said that the purchase was a fit for AIMCo. Northern Courier, which was completed in 2017 has an ongoing contract to ship the Fort Hills Reduced Carbon Life Cycle Dilbit Blend (FRB) to the terminal near Fort McMurray that is owned by Suncor Energy. FRB is produced through a Froth treatment method.

AIMCo lost much more than other "comparable funds" in February and March 2020, the initial weeks of the COVID-19 recession, by having investments "in contracts that pay off only if stock markets remain stable". AIMCo lost $4 billion when the "economic collapse wrought by COVID-19 sent the S&P 500 and other stock benchmarks on a roller coaster ride".

In July 2022, AIMCo and its real estate investment partner in the United Kingdom, Ridgeback Group, bought a portfolio of build-to-rent assets in Cardiff, Birmingham, Sheffield and London for £283m from Angelo Gordon; the investment doubled the overall AIMCo / Ridgeback portfolio.

== Organization ==
=== Employees ===
When AIMCo was created on January 1, 2008, it had a staff of 137. By December 31, 2016, the number of employees has grown to 425, across the organization's Investment Management and Risk teams, Investment Operations, and Corporate Services.

== Clients ==
AIMCo manages funds for a diverse group of Alberta public sector clients. It creates portfolios that reflect the clients' chosen risk and return profiles. The majority of AIMCo's assets under management come from Alberta public sector pension plans and provincial endowment funds. Collectively known as AIMCo's Balanced Funds, these clients are primarily invested in equities, bonds and inflation sensitive products. Other assets, managed for the Government of Alberta, are generally invested in money market and short-term bonds.

=== Alberta Heritage Savings Trust Fund ===
The Alberta Heritage Savings Trust Fund was created in 1976 by the Alberta Heritage Savings Trust Fund Act with three objectives: "to save for the future, to strengthen or diversify the economy, and to improve the quality of life of Albertans".

Initially, the fund received 30 per cent of Alberta's non-renewable resource royalties. During the early 1980s, the fund made loans to other provincial governments in Canada. Later the fund's money was used for capital infrastructure projects.

To date, over $33 billion has been made available to fund Albertans' priorities, such as health care, education, infrastructure and social programs. The Fund is managed with the goal of maximizing long-term real returns at a prudent level of risk. Under the Alberta Heritage Savings Trust Fund Act, all income, less the amount required for inflation proofing, is used as revenue by the government. The Heritage Fund is a member of the International Forum of Sovereign Wealth Funds and is therefore signed up to the Santiago Principles on best practice in managing sovereign wealth funds.

=== Pension Plans ===
Pensions plans whose assets are managed by AIMCo include Local Authorities Pension Plan (LAPP), the Alberta Teachers' Retirement Fund (ATRF), Public Service Pension Plan, Special Forces Pension Plan, Employment Pension Plans Act (EPPA), Public Service Pension Plan (PSPP), Management Employees Pension Plan (MEPP), Provincial Judges and Masters in Chambers Pension Plan (Registered) and Supplementary Retirement Plan for Provincial Judges and Masters in Chambers (Unregistered), and the Supplementary Retirement Plan for Public Service Managers. The sole shareholder of these plans is the Alberta Minister of Finance.

- Local Authorities Pension Plan (LAPP) – On March 1, 2019, LAPP's primary oversight role was transferred from Alberta's Minister of Finance to the newly established LAPP Corporation, which under Canadian law, made the LAPP corporation the fiduciary to LAPP members requiring the corporation to "act solely in the best interests of the members". LAPP formally became a "jointly sponsored pension plan registered under the Employment Pension Plans Act (EPPA) of Alberta".
- Public Service Pension Plan (PSPP) – established in 1947, this plan is for employees of the Alberta government and other public service organizations.
- Special Forces Pension Plan (SFPP) – established in 1979 for police officers, police chiefs, and deputy chiefs employed by local authorities in Alberta.
- Management Employees Pension Plan (MEPP) – the foundations of this plan were established in 1972. Then known as the Public Service Management Pension Plan for management employees of the Alberta government and other public sector organizations. In 1994 the Plan changed and was renamed MEPP.
- Provincial Judges and Masters in Chambers Pension Plan (Registered) and Supplementary Retirement Plan for Provincial Judges and Masters in Chambers (Unregistered); collectively known as the "Judges Pension Plan" – the registered part of the Plan provides benefits up to the maximum allowed for registered pension plans under federal tax rules. The unregistered part of the Plan provides benefits in excess of those limits. Established in 2001 with provisions retroactive to April 1, 1998, the Judges Pension Plan replaced the Provincial Judges and Masters in Chambers Pension Plan established September 1, 1988. Prior to that, judges and masters in chambers contributed to the Public Service Management Pension Plan.
- Supplementary Retirement Plan for Public Service Managers – established on July 1, 1999, this plan provides additional pension benefits to public service managers of designated employers who participate in the Management Employees Pension Plan (MEPP) and whose annual salary exceeds the yearly maximum pensionable earnings limit under Canada's Income Tax Act.

=== Government Funds ===
The Government funds managed by AIMCo are used for Albertan services such as health care, education, infrastructure and social programs. As a result, AIMCo invests in private equity, public equity, fixed income and private debt.

== Controversies ==
=== Consolidation of pension assets ===
On June 11, 2020, the United Conservative government introduced the Reform of Agencies, Boards and Commissions and Government Enterprises Act, 2019 (Bill 22) amending a number of provincial statutes including transferring the administration of the Alberta Teachers' Retirement Fund to AIMCo, and requiring the two other largest public sector pension plans to use only AIMCo as investment managers.

In December 2020, the Universities Academics Pension Plan (UAPP) agreed to move its public equities portfolio from AIMCo to a new investment manager. The UAPP board cited the response by AIMCo to the recent losses attributed to the volatile investment strategy as the reason for the move.

=== 2020 $2.1-billion loss ===
In April 2020, AIMCo reported a $2.1-billion loss following the 2020 stock market crash. The loss was attributed to a volatility-based investment strategy (VOLTS); the strategy was described as a "blunder" by the New York City based trade publication Institutional Investor. The loss represented approximately one-third of AIMCo's 2019 net investment income of $11.5-billion. Following the loss, the fund quickly changed their volatility strategies and CEO Kevin Uebelein announced he would leave AIMCo by June 2021. AIMCo's board of directors completed a review of the VOLTS Investment Strategy in June 2020, AIMCo adopted the ten recommendations of the review intended to prevent a reoccurrence of the severe losses, but did not prohibit the fund from engaging in volatility or other derivative-based investment strategies. Furthermore, the report indicated the risk culture in the organization was "unsatisfactory", and senior leaders were not provided enough information about the risks to investments in a timely manner.

In November 2025, the Alberta government proposed new legislation titled: Bill 12 - Financial Statutes Amendment Act No. 2) - which seeks to shield AIMCo and the province from lawsuits related to an investment decisions made prior to November 2024 - notably the $2.1-billion loss from their Volatility Trading (VOLT) strategy.

== See also ==
- Caisse de dépôt et placement du Québec (CDPQ)
- Canadian Pension Plan Investment Board (CPPI)
- Alberta Heritage Savings Trust Fund
- Ontario Teachers' Pension Plan (OTPP)
- Ontario Municipal Employee Retirement System (OMERS)
- Maple Eight
