= BG =

BG or bg may refer to:

== Organizations ==
=== Businesses ===
- BelGee, a Belarusian-Chinese automotive company
- Bergdorf Goodman, a department store on 5th Avenue, New York, US
- Bord Gáis Energy, an Irish gas supplier
- Bowman Gilfillan, a South African law firm
- British Gas (disambiguation) (privatised and later split between BG plc and Centrica)
  - BG Group, one part of the demerged British Gas plc

=== Education ===
- Bishop Grosseteste University, a higher education institution in Lincoln, UK
- Bishop Guertin High School, Nashua, New Hampshire, US
- Bowling Green State University, Ohio, US
- Bones Gate, a fraternity at Dartmouth College, US

== Music ==
- Bee Gees (BGs), an English-Australian music group.
- B.G. (rapper) ("Baby Gangsta" or "B. Gizzle"), stage name of American rapper Christopher N. Dorsey.
- B.G. Knocc Out, American rapper.
- B.G., the Prince of Rap, Bernard Greene, American rapper and dance music artist.
- Benny Goodman, American jazz musician.
- Blind Guardian, a German power metal band.
- Boris Grebenshchikov, Russian singer and poet, leader of the band Aquarium.
- BarlowGirl, an American all-female Christian rock band.

== Places ==
=== Europe ===
- Belgrade, the capital of Serbia
- Province of Bergamo (vehicle registration plate code), Italy
- Birmingham (vehicle registration plate code), England
- Blaenau Gwent, a county borough in Wales
- Bosnia and Herzegovina (WMO country code)
- Bulgaria (ISO country code)
- Bundesgrenzschutz (vehicle registration plate code), Germany

=== United States ===
- Bowling Green, Kentucky
- Bowling Green, Ohio
- Buffalo Grove, Illinois

=== Elsewhere ===
- Bangladesh (obsolete NATO, FIPS, and LOC MARC country code)
- British Guiana, former name of Guyana

== Police and military ==
- Border guard, police that operate at sovereign borders
- Brigadier general, a military rank (more often written "BGen")
- Great Lakes BG, a US Navy dive-bomber aircraft
- Budi Gunawan, Indonesian politician and retired police officer

== Science and technology ==
- bg (Unix), a Unix command for background processes
- .bg, the ccTLD for Bulgaria
- Basal ganglia, a group of nuclei in the brain
- Blood glucose or blood sugar level
- Bus grant, a control bus signal

== Transportation ==
- Brake Gangwayed, a type of railway coach
- Broad gauge, in railways
- Biman Bangladesh Airlines (IATA airline code BG)
- Bingham and Garfield Railway, in Utah, US
- South Sumatra (vehicle registration prefix BG)

== Other uses ==
- Bulgarian language (ISO 639 alpha-2 language code: bg)
- Bangkok Glass F.C., a football team

== See also ==
- BGS (disambiguation)
