= OPTrust =

Public pension fund in Canada

- Company type: Private
- Industry: Pension fund
- Founded: 1994
- Headquarters: Toronto, Ontario, Canada
- Area served: Province of Ontario
- Key people: Peter Lindley (President and CEO)
- Total assets: Over $25 billion CAD (2022)
- Website: www.optrust.com

OPTrust, officially the OPSEU Pension Trust, is a legal trust formed by the contractual agreement between the two plan sponsors, Ontario Public Service Employees Union (OPSEU) and the Government of Ontario. It manages one of Canada's largest pension funds and administers the OPSEU Pension Plan. It is responsible for investing the plan's assets to support the cost of members' and retirees' pension benefits. It manages the fund for OPSEU members who are employed by the Government of Ontario and certain agencies, boards and commissions.

OPSEU negotiated the creation of OPTrust, giving Ontario Public Service (OPS) members and pensioners a say in their pension plan through joint trusteeship.

It is subject to the rules and regulations governing pension plans in Ontario and Canada, including the Pension Benefits Act (Ontario) and the Income Tax Act (Canada).

Ontario Pension Board is one of Canada's top ten pension funds, nicknamed the "Maple Revolutionaries." Due to their size, they are not included in the Maple Eight

== History ==
OPTrust began operations on January 1, 1995, and is a separate organization from both of its sponsors. As sponsors, the Government of Ontario and OPSEU each appoint five trustees to the OPTrust board of trustees.

== OPSEU Pension Plan ==
The OPSEU Pension Plan is a defined benefit pension plan. It was established to provide pension benefits for employees of the province of Ontario in bargaining units represented by OPSEU and other eligible members. The trust administers the pension benefits for over 100,000 members and retirees.

When the plan was launched, the pension assets and the liability for members’ earned benefits were transferred from the Public Service Pension Plan (PSPP). Since that time the two plans have been administered separately, and there are differences in the benefits provided under the two plans.

The PSPP remains the pension plan for management and excluded staff and employees represented by other bargaining agents in the OPS and certain provincial government agencies. The PSPP is administered by the Ontario Pension Board (OPB).

== See also ==
- Canada Pension Plan
- Ontario Teachers' Pension Plan
- OMERS
