= Ontario Teachers' Pension Plan =

Ontario educational pension plan organization

Ontario Teachers' Pension Plan Board
- Type: Public–private partnership
- Industry: Pension fund
- Founded: January 1, 1990; 36 years ago
- Headquarters: Toronto, Ontario, Canada
- Key people: Jo Taylor (CEO); Steve McGirr (chairman)
- Total assets: ▲ C$247.5 billion (2023)
- Number of employees: ▲2,000+
- Subsidiaries: Cadillac Fairview
- Website: otpp.com

The Ontario Teachers' Pension Plan Board (French: Régime de retraite des enseignantes et des enseignants de l'Ontario) is an independent organization responsible for administering defined-benefit pensions for school teachers of the Canadian province of Ontario. Ontario Teachers' also invests the plan's pension fund and it is one of the world's largest institutional investors, acting as a partner organization of the World Economic Forum. The plan is a multi-employer pension plan, jointly sponsored by the Government of Ontario and the Ontario Teachers' Federation.

As of December 31, 2024, the OTPP had over $266 billion in net assets, with a one-year total-fund net return of 9.4%, and a 7.4% 10-year total-fund net return. The OTPP employs a Quality Service Index to measure its performance. In 2024, 93% of members sampled expressed satisfaction with the OTPP's service.

OTPP is one of Canada's top eight pension funds, nicknamed the "Maple 8" or "Maple Revolutionaries".

== History ==
Ontario Teachers' was established on January 1, 1990. Until then, Ontario teachers' pensions had been sponsored solely by the Ontario government. Assets of the plan had been invested in government bonds only. Currently, it invests globally in fixed income, public and private equity markets, real estate, infrastructure, natural resources, credit and venture capital through Teachers' Venture Growth (TVG).

== Organization ==
As of December 2024, the OTPP had over $266 billion in net assets. The plan had 185,000 working members, and 158,000 pensioners with the average retirement age of 59, and a $50,700 starting pension. $8.1 billion was paid to retired Ontario teachers and their beneficiaries in 2024. Teachers contribute 10.4% of their annual salary below the Canada Pension Plan limit ($71,300), plus 12% of any salary above the CPP. A teacher who earns $85,000 in 2025 will contribute $9,059 or $754/month. Contributions are matched by the Government of Ontario. Total member and government contributions are unknown but in 2025 the OTPP announced a $29 billion funding surplus. In 2014, OTPP reported a funding surplus of $5.1 billion for the first time in ten years. Ontario Teachers' is headquartered in Toronto, with regional offices in London, New York, Hong Kong, Singapore, and Mumbai. In January, 2020, Jo Taylor succeeded Ron Mock as President and Chief Executive Officer. Jo Taylor, had his compensation reduced from $5.6 million in 2021 to $5 million in 2022. The Chair of Ontario Teachers' is Steve McGirr.

== Investments ==
As one of Canada's largest institutional investors, Ontario Teachers' reported having $249.8 billion in net assets as of June 30, 2023, and over $266 billion at the end of 2024. OTPP reported a 9.4% one-year total-fund net return, and a 7.4% 10-year total-fund net return for 2024. In 2023, the fund underperformed with a 1.9% one-year total-fund net return. Underexposure in equities, and valuation adjustments and higher interest rates in infrastructure and real estate portfolios were listed as contributing factors. In 2024, 36% of gross investments were in Canada, with 33% in the US, 17% in Europe, the Middle East and Africa, 8% in Asia Pacific, and 6% in Latin America, .

Ontario Teachers' owns and manages a diversified portfolio of Canadian and international assets. Through its fully owned real estate subsidiary, Cadillac Fairview, Ontario Teachers' owns commercial properties that include the Toronto-Dominion Centre, Toronto Eaton Centre, the Pacific Centre in Vancouver, the Rideau Centre in Ottawa, and White City Place in London, UK. It also has a growing portfolio of residential rentals in Montreal and Ottawa.

Through its private equity investment arm, Private Capital, Ontario Teachers' owns interests in companies such as Munchkin, PODS, Techem, GFL Environmental, and Shearer's Foods. In 2001, Ontario Teachers' Pension Plan and Caisse de dépôt et placement du Québec were the sole two investors in a US$360 million fund raised by Canadian company Cordiant Capital.

Ontario Teachers' owned Camelot Group PLC, which held an exclusive licence to operate the UK National Lottery until January 31, 2024. It acquired a share of the Irish National Lottery in 2014. In July, 2023, OTPP sold its majority shareholding in Premier Lotteries Ireland to La Française des Jeux, a lottery and online gaming operator.

Ontario Teachers' owns a substantial portfolio of infrastructure assets, including stakes in Birmingham Airport, Bristol Airport, Copenhagen Airport, and London City Airport, as well as international water and power utilities. Alongside PSP Investments, Ontario Teachers' owns Cubico Sustainable Investments, a leading provider of renewable energy.

From 2003 to 2012, the fund was the principal owner of Maple Leaf Sports & Entertainment, the parent organization of the Toronto Maple Leafs, Toronto Raptors, Toronto FC and Toronto Argonauts. The franchise was sold to BCE Inc. and Rogers Communications in 2012.

In 2017, it acquired Mémora Servicios Funerarias, a Spanish funeral provider, from 3i.

In 2019, Ontario Teachers', along with Amazon and others, assisted in financing to help the New York Yankees regain ownership control of their regional sports network, the YES Network, resulting in a minority ownership in the network.

In 2022, the pension fund was targeting investments in India, opening an office in Mumbai in September.

In 2021 and 2022, Ontario Teachers' invested US$75 million in FTX and US$20 million in FTX.US respectively, through its Teachers' Venture Growth platform. Following FTX's collapse in early November 2022, Ontario Teachers' stated that it will write off the entirety of its US$95 million investment by the end of 2022.

In June 2024, after Canadian pension plans lost a combined $1.24 trillion in their property portfolios, the worst fiscal year performance since the 2008 financial crisis, CEO Jo Taylor, told Bloomberg: "What’s worked famously well for the last 35 years may not work so well for the next five to 10." OTPP reportedly shifted authority away from Cadillac Fairview and brought their real estate investments in-house.

By December 2024, OTPP's Cadillac Fairview had over 1,160 residential rental units under construction, with projects at CF Carrefour Laval and 750 Peel Street in Montreal, and CF Rideau in Ottawa.

In March 2025, it was reported that OTPP sold Amica Senior Lifestyles and its assets and affiliates for C$4.6 billion ($3.2 billion) to Welltower. Welltower stated it purchased: 31 in-place properties at a "substantial discount"; seven properties under construction; and, nine development parcels in "highly affluent and supply constrained neighborhoods" in Ontario and British Columbia. OTPP bought the senior home operator, Amica, in 2015 for $578 million.

In June 2025, the board announced they had partnered with Gordion, and would acquire two buildings with 425 rental residences in the Greater Stockholm area, as part of their "growing European residential portfolio".

In August 2025, Ontario Teachers' Pension Plan invested $40 million funding in AI-powered cloud HCM suite platform Darwinbox.

== ESG and responsible investing ==
On June 6, 2018, a group of global institutional investors, led by Ontario Teachers' and CDPQ, in collaboration with the Government of Canada, announced a project to advance key G7 objectives. Partner Institutions AIMCo, Allianz, Aviva, CalPERS, CDPQ, Generali, Natixis Investment Managers, OMERS, Ontario Teachers', OPTrust, and PGGM pledged to commit resources, expertise and networks to three initiatives: enhancing expertise in infrastructure financing and development of emerging and frontier economies; opening opportunities for women in finance and investment worldwide; and speeding up the implementation of uniform and comparable climate-related disclosures under the FSB-TCFD framework.

On September 26, 2018, Ontario Teachers' joined finance, health and government leaders in signing the Tobacco-Free Finance Pledge (of the NGO Tobacco-Free Portfolios), which commits the pension plan to no longer invest in tobacco companies.

On January 21, 2021, Ontario Teachers' announced its commitment to net zero greenhouse gas emissions by 2050, disclosing that its strategy will focus on financing climate solutions that replace fossil fuels and reduce emissions.

== Media coverage ==
On the January 12, 2004 episode of Rick Mercer Report, comedian Rick Mercer had a short segment about the Ontario Teachers' Pension Plan, in which he humorously contrasted the plan's beneficiaries (i.e. teachers) with the investments the plan had made, including shopping malls and the tobacco industry.

On December 2, 2008, New York lawyer Marc Stuart Dreier was arrested at Ontario Teachers' Toronto offices and charged with impersonating, through his words and by the use of business cards, Michael Padfield, a senior lawyer with the pension plan. A receptionist in the Ontario Teachers' offices had become suspicious and notified Toronto police. Dreier was attempting to close a sale of forged Ontario Teachers' promissory notes, worth US$44.7 million, by meeting with the buyers right in the Ontario Teachers' offices.

A 2012 article in The Economist titled "Maple Revolutionaries" about Canada's largest public pension funds features Ontario Teachers', saying it pioneered a new style of investing in the 1990s by managing more of its portfolio internally and doing more direct investing. Then Ontario Teachers' CEO Jim Leech called Canadian pension funds a "new brand of financial institution" likened to depoliticized sovereign-wealth funds.

== See also ==
- Teachers Insurance and Annuity Association of America
