= Starlight Investments =

Canadian company

- Industry: Real estate; Asset management
- Founded: 2011
- Headquarters: Toronto, Ontario, Canada,
- Key people: Daniel Drimmer (Founder/CEO)
- Website: starlightinvest.com

Starlight Investments is a privately held Canadian real estate investment and asset management company based in Toronto, Ontario. As of 2024, Starlight owns 70,000 multi-family units (54,000 in Canada and 10,000 in the United States), 8 million square feet of commercial space, and over 600 properties across Canada. They are the largest private landlord in Canada.

== History ==
In 2011, Drimmer founded Starlight Investments. In 2012, Drimmer acquired his former company TransGlobe REIT for $1 billion, and also acquired 72 additional buildings with a subsidiary from the Public Sector Pension Investment Board. In February 2020, Starlight bought Northview Apartments REIT.

In 2016, Starlight drew scrutiny from tenants and local politicians around proposed 'renovictions' of tenants. It has also faced other complaints around landlord practices.

The company created a real estate securities investment company, Starlight Capital, in 2018. That November, Starlight Capital announced the Starlight Hybrid Global Real Assets Trust to give retail investors access to a real estate mutual fund.

In January 2021, Starlight purchased the naming rights to a stadium at City Centre Park in Langford after making a sponsorship deal with the city, which saw Bear Mountain Stadium renamed to Starlight Stadium as part of the five-year deal.

In April 2022, Starlight Capital acquired Stone Investment Group, making them the largest owner/operator of purpose-built rental housing in Canada.

In June, Starlight Investments' Canadian Residential Growth Fund III raised CDN $1.2 billion, with 61% of the capital coming from foreign investors. This was the first time foreign investors contributed to one of Starlight's funds.

Research from a University of Waterloo researcher found that "financial firms are raising rents higher than other types of landlords. On average, after a financial firm acquires a building, they increase the eviction-filing rate by three." Starlight has been granted approval twice by Ontario's Landlord and Tenant Board to raise the rent above the provincial guidelines as reported in 2024. One of these exceptions was passed in June 2024.
