= Kananaskis Country Golf Course =

Golf course in Alberta, Canada

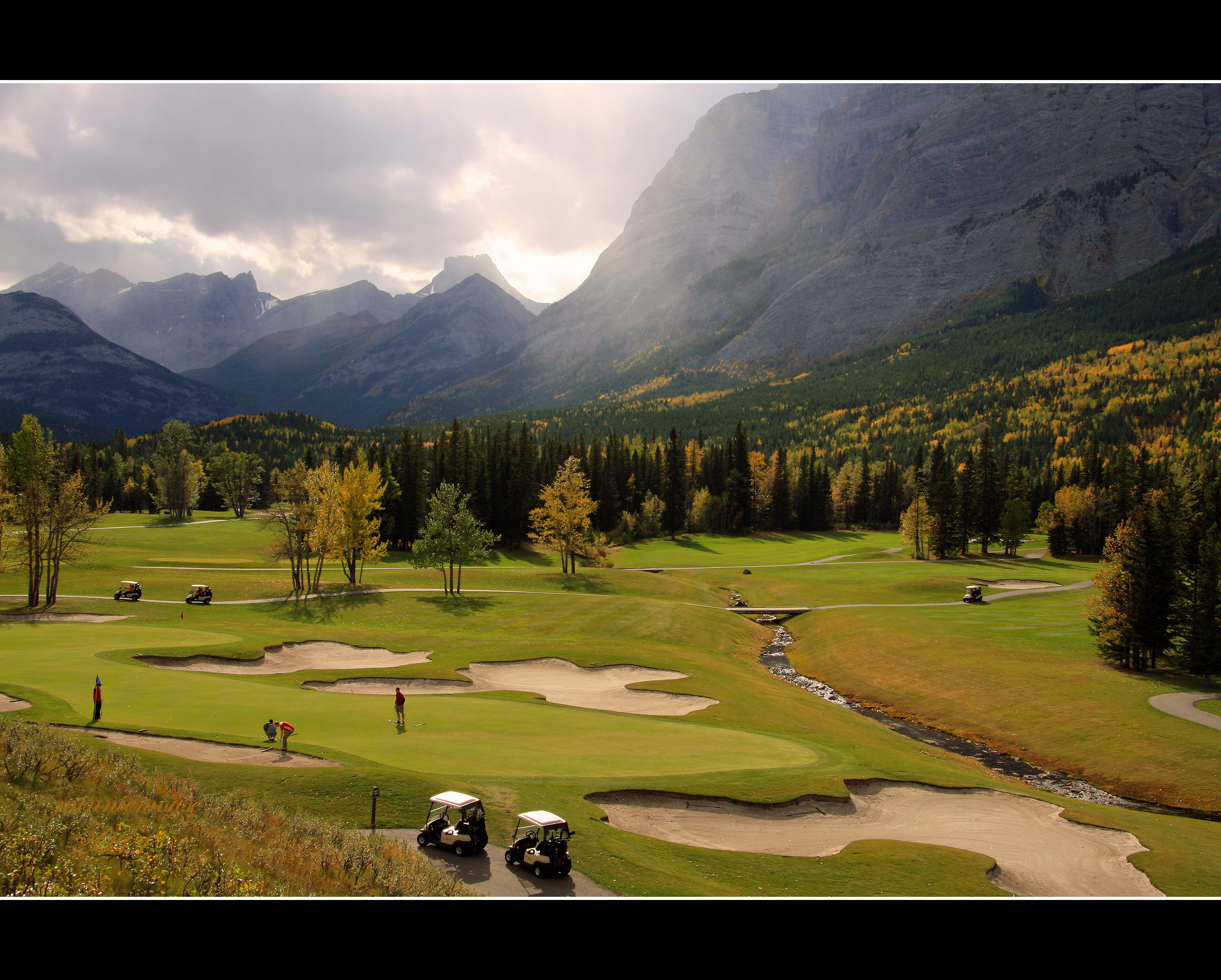
- Interactive map of Kananaskis Country Golf Course
- 50°54′10.16″N 115°8′36.16″W

Club information
- Location: Kananaskis Improvement District, Alberta
- Established: 1983
- Type: Public
- Owner: Government of Alberta
- Operator: Kan-Alta Golf Management Ltd
- Total holes: 36
- Website: kananaskisgolf.com

Mount Kidd Course
- Designed by: Robert Trent Jones
- Par: 72
- Length: 7,136 yd (6,525 m)
- Course rating: 73.7
- Slope rating: 140

Mount Lorette Course
- Designed by: Robert Trent Jones
- Par: 72
- Length: 7,232 yd (6,613 m)
- Course rating: 74.6
- Slope rating: 139

Kananaskis Country Golf Course is a public 36-hole golf course situated in Kananaskis Country, a park system west of Calgary, Alberta, Canada: in the foothills and front ranges of the Canadian Rockies.

The course opened in 1983 and was purchased for $25.5 Million. The facility is located at the south of Kananaskis Village, Alberta. There are two 18-hole golf layouts, named Mt. Lorette and Mt. Kidd, after the mountains under which they play. The course ranks frequently in the top courses in Canada including the rankings of Score Golf Magazine. The two courses host about sixty thousand rounds of golf annually with eighty-five percent played by Albertans.

During the June 2013 Alberta floods, Kananaskis Country "sustained the most extensive damage in its 36-year history."Alberta's government committed $18 million to rebuild the course and to protect it from the future flood damage.

== History ==
The course was built while Premier Peter Lougheed was in office at a cost of $25.5 million ($72 million in 2025) using energy resource money from the Alberta Heritage Savings Trust Fund to diversify Alberta's economy. Since its opening in 1983, Kan-Alta Golf Management Ltd has had the lease to operate the Kananaskis Country Golf Course. Kan-Alta Golf was the construction manager for the restoration of the golf course, following the 2013 flood.

== Architect ==
The courses were designed by Robert Trent Jones. He described the course's location in the Rockies as "the best natural setting I’ve ever been given to work with." Early in his career, Jones had formed a partnership with Canadian architect Stanley Thompson, and he helped to design several courses in Canada, including Capilano in Vancouver and Banff in the Canadian Rockies. Between 1931 and 1999, Jones designed or re-designed about 500 golf courses in at least 40 U.S. states and 35 other countries.

Gary Browning was the architect who led the flood restoration project. The project upgraded the course to six tees per hole and included a very short forward distance.

== Courses ==
The Kananaskis River runs through both golf courses.

Mount Lorette is the north course. The front nine goes through the forest and a couple of lakes are encountered starting at the fifth hole. The river is seen starting on the 14th hole and runs alongside a stretch of four holes.

Mount Kidd is the south course. The river runs along and comes into play through most of the first 12 holes before the course proceeds into the woods on the southeast segment of the property. Mount Kidd is the shorter of the courses. Holes 2 and 5 meet near a bend in the river. Mount Kidd also features the two longest par fives on the property. The course features a double green near the clubhouse. It serves the 18th of Mount Lorette and the 9th of Mount Kidd.

== Course Scorecards ==
Kananaskis Country Golf Course - Mount Kidd
Tee	Rating/Slope	1	2	3	4	5	6	7	8	9	Out	10	11	12	13	14	15	16	17	18	In	Total
Par		4	5	4	3	4	5	4	3	4	36	4	4	3	4	5	4	3	4	5	36	72
SI		3	1	7	13	17	9	15	11	5		10	18	14	4	6	12	16	8	2
Black	73.7 / 140	454	612	413	197	330	560	413	197	400	3576	421	416	212	391	493	390	204	394	639	3560	7136
Red	71.2 / 136	429	563	376	183	291	501	379	176	375	3273	406	398	191	381	466	364	186	369	603	3364	6637
Blue	M:68.8/132 W:74.9/145	391	541	350	169	277	479	347	152	350	3056	388	385	165	350	439	341	160	343	560	3131	6187
White	M:66.2/123 W:71.8/136	369	514	325	162	258	460	330	124	326	2868	346	330	130	306	412	296	142	328	509	2799	5867
Orange	W:67.9 / 124	325	394	313	139	249	376	313	111	302	2572	302	283	116	272	381	273	119	296	425	2467	4989
Gold	W:59.4 / 98	140	262	185	106	177	311	226	90	214	1711	249	223	94	191	258	190	97	221	300	1813	3534

== Ratings ==
SCOREGolf’s Golfers’ Choice Awards has recognized Kananaskis Country Golf Course as "Best of the Best" in the following categories: Best Value in the West, Best Service in the West, Best Condition in the West, Best par 4 in the West, Best Par 5 in the West, and Best Golf Destination in the West. Golf Digest rated the Mount Kidd and Mount Lorette in the top 50 Courses in North America for "Great Value."

Score Golf Magazine rated this facility at 7.6400, making it among the top courses in Alberta.

In 2011, ScoreGolf listed Mt. Kidd as the third Best Public Course in Alberta, with Mt. Lorette taking fifth place and Golf Week included Mt.Kidd on its list of Best Canadian Golf Modern Courses. In November 2011, the golf publication, Golf Digest included Kananaskis Country Golf Course on its top 75 golf resorts biennial list.

== Economic impact ==
In 2011, the Kananaskis Country Golf Course showed a province wide net economic impact of $14 million, 175 full-time equivalent jobs sustained province wide, and a $4.4 million federal, $1.9 million provincial and $800,000 local taxes generated.

== 2013 Alberta floods ==
The Kananaskis I.D. in which the Kananaskis Country Golf Course is located was severely flooded in the June 2013 Alberta floods, the costliest insured natural disaster in Canadian history. Of the thirty six holes, all but four were flood damaged. Buildings on higher ground, valued at $15 million, were not damaged.

On 16 July 2014, Alberta Environment and Sustainable Resource Development (AESRD) finalized and signed an agreement with Kan-Alta Golf Management Ltd., a company with alleged connections the provincial government to rebuild the golf course.

Calgary Herald journalist McClure reported a "secret deal" involving AESRD, "resulted in over $5.4 million" paid to Kan-Alta Golf "to cover business losses and other expenses" at the Kananaskis Country Golf Course, as a result of the 2013 flood damage. Also, "another $145,000 in property taxes owed by Kan-Alta Golf Management Ltd. were forgiven by government appointees on the local improvement district and reimbursement sought from the province." This was confirmed by Alberta Municipal Affairs. McClure added that "another $8 million in compensation and some portion of the $15-million estimate for rebuilding the 36-hole facility may yet be paid to Kan-Alta."

"Scott Hennig, vice-president of the Canadian Taxpayers Federation, said he’s concerned Kan-Alta and its owners may have been paid twice for the same thing by different government departments as a result of the property tax deal."

According to an independent report by Deloitte LLP in September 2015, Alberta taxpayers would have to pay up to $16.9 million to break the contract with Kan-Alta. The contract between the PC government of Alberta and the company "dates back to the course’s opening in 1983 when documents show the firm — owned by friends and former associates of former premier Don Getty who have donated $2,600 to the Tories in recent years — was awarded the contract to operate the facility even though government documents show they were not the lowest bidder." The contract will be put out to public tender until 2026. "No one in our government wants to be in the golf course business … and in 2026 this will be put out to public tender.
