= Blake Hutcheson =

Canadian businessman

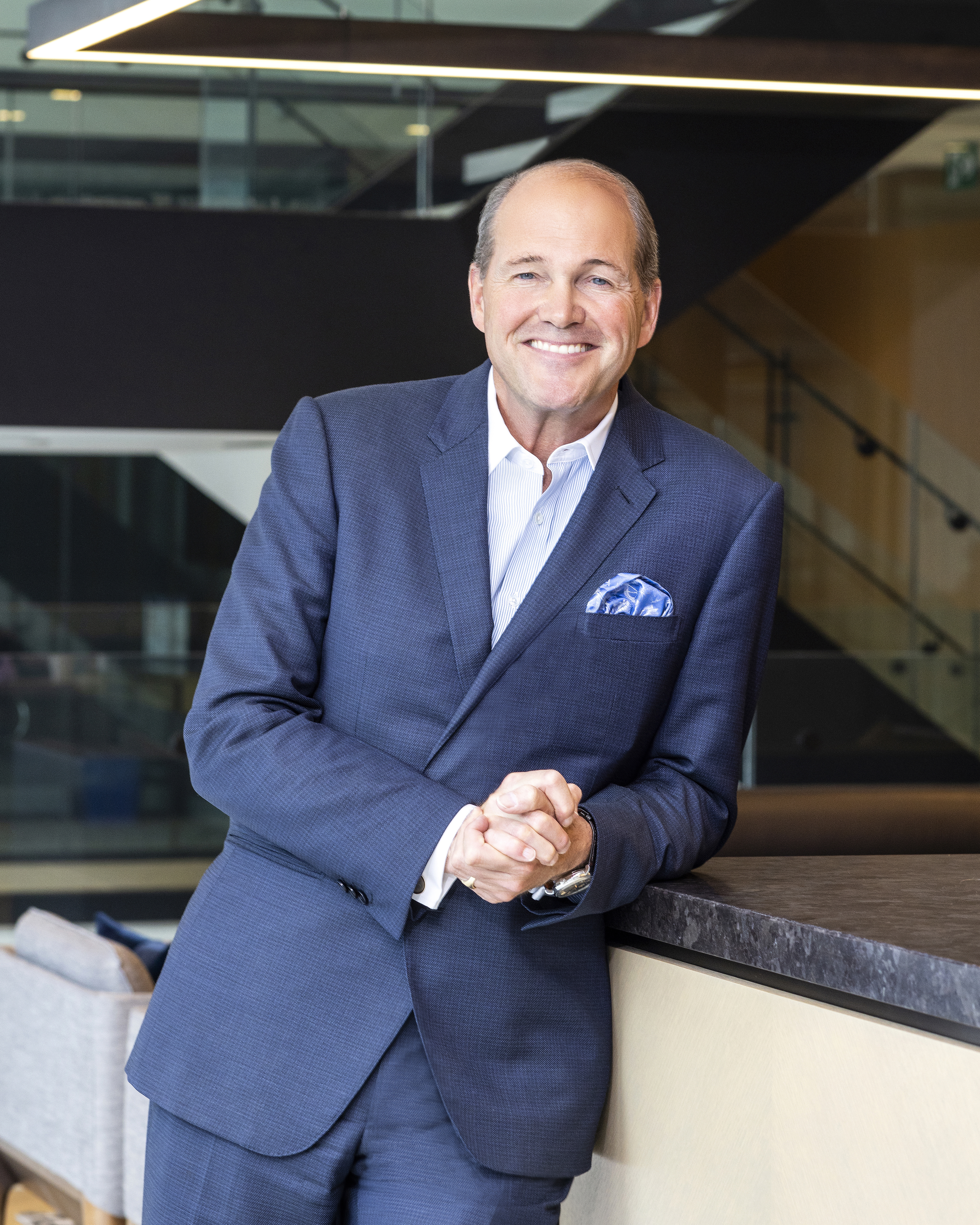
Blake Hutcheson, OMERS president and chief executive officer

Blake Hutcheson OOnt (born 1962) is president and CEO of OMERS. He was appointed OMERS president and chief pension officer in 2018. He previously served as president and CEO of Oxford Properties Group Inc since 2010, and in 2014 he also became chief investment officer, real estate and strategic investments and added the OMERS Platform Investments portfolio.

Prior to OMERS, Blake was head of global real estate with Mount Kellett Capital Management, a New York–based private equity firm. Previously, he was chairman and president of Canadian, Latin American, and Mexican operations for CB Richard Ellis.

Blake attended Upper Canada College before graduating from the University of Western Ontario. He also completed a graduate diploma in international and comparative politics at the London School of Economics and a master's degree in real estate development at Columbia University.

Hutcheson was listed in Canada's Top 40 Under 40.

In January 2024, he was appointed to the Order of Ontario.

Hutcheson plays Masters Lacrosse every summer for his home town of Huntsville, Ontario. He is married and has two children.
