= BBGI =

Luxembourg based investment company

BBGI Global Infrastructure S.A.
- Type: Public Limited Company
- Traded as: LSE: BBGI; FTSE 250 component
- ISIN: LU0686550053
- Industry: Investment
- Founded: 2011; 15 years ago
- Headquarters: Luxembourg
- Key people: Sarah Whitney (chair of the supervisory board) Duncan Ball (Chief Executive Officer) Michael Denny (Chief Financial and Operating Officer) Andreas Parzych (Executive Director)
- Owner: British Columbia Investment Management Corporation
- Website: www.bb-gi.com

BBGI Global Infrastructure is a Luxembourg-based investment company dedicated to infrastructure investments. Until 2025, it was listed on the London Stock Exchange and was a constituent of the FTSE 250 Index.

On June 23, 2025, it was announced that the firm had been acquired by the British Columbia Investment Management Corporation (BCI) for £1 billion.

== History ==
Established in 2011 as Bilfinger Berger Global Infrastructure, it was formed under the management of Frank Schramm and Duncan Ball, who were both managers previously employed by the investment arm of Bilfinger Berger. It adopted the name BBGI SICAV SA in 2014 before renaming itself BBGI Global Infrastructure.

In February 2025, Boswell Holdings, a company indirectly controlled by BCI, offered to acquire the company for approximately £1.06 billion. In June, a month after the offer was declared unconditional, BCI completed the purchase.
