= Public Sector Pension Investment Board =

Canadian crown corporation

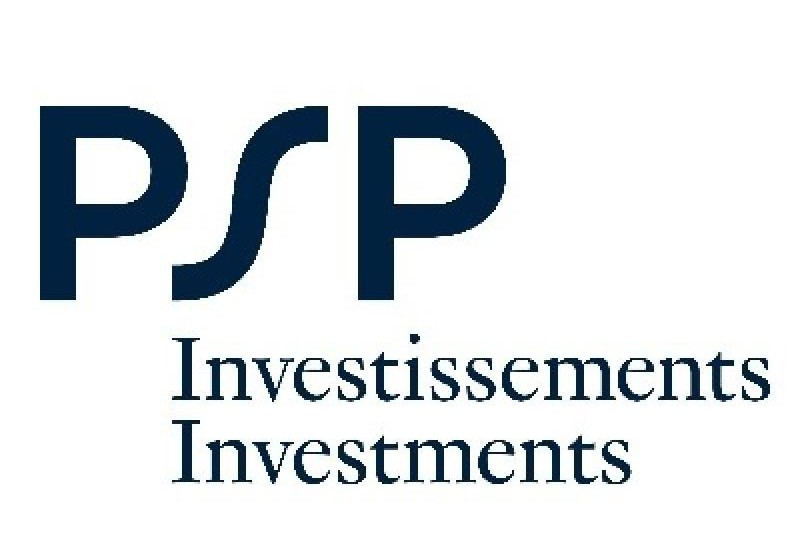
- Type: Crown corporation
- Industry: Pension fund
- Founded: September 14, 1999; 27 years ago
- Founder: Parliament of Canada
- Headquarters: 135 Laurier Avenue; Ottawa, Ontario, Canada
- Key people: Maryse Bertrand (Chair of the Board); Deborah K. Orida (CEO)
- Total assets: ▲CA$299.7 billion (March 2025)
- Website: investpsp.com

The Public Sector Pension Investment Board (PSPIB; French: Office d'investissement des régimes de pensions du secteur public), operating as PSP Investments (French: Investissements PSP), is a Canadian Crown corporation established by the Parliament of Canada on September 14, 1999 through the Public Sector Pension Investment Board Act. PSP Investments is one of Canada's largest pension investment managers, with CAD $264.9 billion of net assets under management in fiscal year 2024.

More than 1000 professionals manage a diversified global portfolio composed of investments in public financial markets, private equity, real estate, seniors housing, infrastructure, natural resources and private debt. PSP Investments' head office is located in Ottawa, Ontario, and its chief business office is located in Montreal, Quebec. It also has offices in New York City, London and Hong Kong.

PSP Investments is one of Canada's top eight pension funds, nicknamed the "Maple 8" or "Maple Revolutionaries.

== History ==
PSP Investments was incorporated as a Crown corporation under the Public Sector Pension Investment Board Act in 1999. The investments will fund retirement benefits under the Plans for service after April 1, 2000, for the Public Service, Canadian Armed Forces, Royal Canadian Mounted Police, and after March 1, 2007, for the Reserve Force.

In May 2013, German construction company Hochtief sold its airports division (renamed AviAlliance) to PSP Investments for 1.1 billion euros. In October 2015, PSP Investments formed a joint venture with ATL Partners, creating SKY Leasing, a service aircraft leasing company.

In 2018, PSP bought the 370 acre Downsview Airport site in Toronto from Bombardier Inc. for a reported US $635 million. PSP created a Northcrest Developments, a wholly owned subsidiary, to manage the development of the site into a mixed-use urban development.

In April 2023, PSP Investments entered into an agreement with the Government of Canada to be the investment manager for the CAD $15 billion Canada Growth Fund (CGF). In September 2023, FirstLight Power, owned by PSP Investments, acquired Hydroméga, a Montreal-based clean power producer and developer operating in Eastern Canada. In November 2023, PSP Investments participated in the Series A fundraise of Toronto-based Promise Robotics, which was led by Horizon Ventures.

In 2024, PSP reported a 16% loss on its real estate investments which was its worst performance in this asset class since the 2008 financial crisis.

In June 2024, PSP Investments appointed Maryse Bertrand, the Chair of the Board of Governors of McGill University and Board Member of Metro Inc., as the new Chair of its Board of Directors.

In July 2024, PSP Investments acquired a fourteen-percent stake in French nursing home company Korian.

PSP Investments and its partner, Starlight Investments, announced rent increases to some of their 6000 residential units in Toronto and the GTA, in 2022. They applied for an Above Guideline Increase (AGI) of 4.2 %. Some residents protested and withheld rent for a year. PSP Investments are part of a growing trend of Canadian public pension funds impacting residential real estate across Canada and around the world.

== See also ==
- Caisse de dépôt et placement du Québec
- CPP Investment Board
- OMERS
