= B2G =

B2G may refer to:

- B2G OS, community-developed successor to Firefox OS
- Battery-to-grid, specifically vehicle-to-grid
- Be2gether, a music and arts festival held in Lithuania
- Boot to Gecko, the codename for Firefox OS, a mobile operating system proposed by Mozilla and built upon its Gecko layout engine
- Bridge to Grace, an American rock band from Atlanta, Georgia
- Business-to-government
- Great Lakes B2G, a US Navy carrier-borne bomber
- B2Gold, Canadian gold mining company

== See also ==
- B2B
- B2C
