= Alberta Heritage Savings Trust Fund =

Sovereign wealth fund of the Canadian province of Alberta

Fund overview
- Formed: 19 May 1976
- Headquarters: Queen Elizabeth II Building, 9820 107 Street, Edmonton, Alberta, Canada
- Minister responsible: Nate Horner, Minister of Finance
- Fund executive: Tany Yao, Chair of the Standing Committee on the Alberta Heritage Savings Trust Fund
- Key document: Alberta Heritage Savings Trust Fund Act
- Website: www.alberta.ca/heritage-savings-trust-fund

The Alberta Heritage Savings Trust Fund (AHSTF) is a sub-sovereign wealth fund established in 1976 by the Government of Alberta under Premier Peter Lougheed. The Heritage Savings Trust Fund was created with three objectives: "to save for the future, to strengthen or diversify the economy, and to improve the quality of life of Albertans." The operations of the Heritage Savings Trust Fund are subject to the Alberta Heritage Savings Trust Fund Act and with the goal of providing "prudent stewardship of the savings from Alberta's non-renewable resources by providing the greatest financial returns on those savings for current and future generations of Albertans." Between 1976 and 1983 the Government of Alberta deposited a portion of oil revenue into the fund. During those years, the AHSTF used oil revenues to invest for the long term in Alberta, in such areas as health care, education and research and as a way of ensuring that the development of non-renewable resources would be of long-term benefit to Alberta.

The strategy and goals of the fund changed through successive provincial governments, drawing criticism as the value of the fund failed to grow for decades; despite provincial non-renewable natural resource revenues, from 1980 to 2014, bringing in almost $190 billion, the value of the Heritage Fund in 2014 was only $17.3 billion. The fund was established in 1976 accruing 30 per cent of provincial non-renewable resource revenues, which was subsequently lowered to 15 per cent in 1983 and then completely eliminated in 1987. Late in the 1982-83 fiscal year, the government had started transferring the AHSTF's annual investment income to general revenues, preventing any compound growth within the fund. The combination of no new deposits from non-renewable resource revenues and the withdrawal of all annual investment income, caused the AHSTF to stagnate for over two decades. Furthermore, the stagnant balance in the fund was not immune to market forces, gaining and losing value according to general market trends, such as a $3 billion loss during the 2009 Great Recession. Collectively, this slashed the inflation-adjusted value of the AHSTF, from $30.4 billion (in 2025 real dollars) at the end of fiscal 1986-87, down to $18.6 billion (in 2025 real dollars) at the end of fiscal 2021-22.

In fiscal 2022–23, the government finally allowed the AHSTF to retain its annual investment income, and even deposited some non-renewable resource revenues into the fund that year, adding a second deposit in fiscal 2024-25. On December 31, 2025, the AHSTF's fair market value was listed at $31.9 billion.

In 2025, half a century after the AHSTF was conceived, the Government of Alberta made changes to focus on stewardship, independence, protecting capital, and maximizing returns with a capital appreciation–focused growth strategy, with a plan to grow the fund to $250 billion by 2050. The intent is for the AHSTF to finally meet the original goal, from the early 1970s, of reducing Alberta's reliance on volatile non-renewable resource revenues.

== History ==
=== Formation and early history ===
Value of the Alberta Heritage Savings Trust Fund as reported by the Government of Alberta (year end 2020)

The Progressive Conservative government under Premier Peter Lougheed swept into power after the 1971 election ending the 36-year Social Credit government. The Progressive Conservatives promised change and began quickly with public consultations on energy policy. The previous Social Credit government limited royalties on oil and gas at 16.6 per cent, which was written into each mineral lease. The result of the consultation and government analysis concluded public ownership share of energy resources should be higher, oil and natural gas were priced below value, resource upgrading and employment in Alberta must be increased, and Albertans deserved greater investment opportunity for public-owned resources. The government of Alberta made efforts to increase export prices of oil and natural gas in 1972, which was accelerated due to the 1973 energy crisis, and legislated royalty increases into existing mineral lease contracts. Other major policy changes included expanding the mandate of the government-owned pipeline Alberta Gas Trunk Line to include upgrading activities. Finally, the government created the Alberta Energy Company with $150 million, half of which was provided by the Legislature and the other half came from Albertans who could purchase $10 shares.

The Alberta Heritage Savings Trust Fund was proposed in 1974 legislation, with the decision to move forward announced in February 1975, as part of the 1975-1976 budget tabled by the Progressive Conservative government led by Premier Peter Lougheed in the 17th Legislature. The fund would be established to hold $1.5 billion, and scarce details were provided by Provincial Treasurer Gordon Miniely, noting that the fund would be for the betterment of current and future Albertans. The 17th Legislative Assembly was dissolved only days later and the 1975 Alberta general election was scheduled for March 26. Former Progressive Conservative Cabinet Minister Allan Warrack claims the decision to introduce the legislation – while knowing the legislature would be dissolved before enactment – was intentional to allow widespread public review, transparency, and accountability.

The proposed Alberta Heritage Savings Trust Fund became a central issue during the election, and Premier Lougheed used the opportunity to outline the policy behind the fund. The fund would be used to diversify and strengthen the Alberta economy, improve the capacity and quality of life for future Albertans, stimulate the economy and continue to accumulate interest on the principal. Furthermore, Lougheed stated the funds would not be invested in a way as to interfere with private sector activity, or disrupt existing financial institutions, and primarily be invested inside Alberta. Lougheed in debates in the Legislature further refined the purpose of the fund, stating it was not to transform Alberta into an "industrial state", stating he did not want smoke-stacks, but instead the "best jobs" and "brain power". Lougheed and the Progressive Conservative campaign was successful, and he returned to power with a strong majority government controlling 69 of 75 seats in the Legislature.

The fund was created with the passage of The Alberta Heritage Savings Trust Fund Act (Bill 35) during the second session of the 18th Alberta Legislature, receiving Royal Assent on May 19, 1976. The bill legislated the transfer of $1.5 billion (equivalent to $7.920×10^{9} in 2025) in assets from the Province's General Revenue Fund and committed 30 per cent of the province's annual non-renewable resource revenue into the fund. Non-renewable resource revenue included any revenue received by the Alberta government related to agreements or bonuses under the Mines and Minerals Act, including royalty or in lieu of royalty for bituminous sands leases. The Act also created the 15-person Legislature Committee to review the operations of the fund, but not manage any of the investments. The fund was divided into three investment divisions. The Capital Projects Division with up to 20 per cent of the fund's assets invested in projects with long-term economic or social benefits to Albertans. The Canada Investment Division with up to 15 per cent of the fund's assets made loans to other governments or government agencies in Canada. The Alberta Investment Division sought opportunities in Alberta where investments would strengthen and diversify the economy.

The fund was initially criticized for the absence of public consultation in the development of overarching legislation, Cabinet's control over 80 per cent of the fund's investments, leaving the Legislature with control over 20 per cent of the fund's assets. The Progressive Conservative government made concessions to give the Legislature power to vote on deposits made into the fund each year, but Premier Lougheed called giving the Legislature additional control over investments impractical, naïve and ridiculous. Progressive Conservative Government House Leader Lou Hyndman rationalized the absence of Legislature control over investments noting matters concerning investment are traditionally the prerogative of the government.

The Alberta Heritage Savings Trust Fund's first year of operations saw the legislated deposit of $1,500 million in assets from the Government of Alberta, $620 million in deposits resulting from 30 per cent of the Province's non-renewable resource revenue, and $88 million in investment earnings. The initial $1,500 million transfer included $254.5 million in cash, with the remaining assets including debentures from the Alberta Housing Corporation, Alberta Home Mortgage Corporation, Alberta Government Telephones, and Alberta Municipal Financing Corporation; as well as shares from Alberta Energy Company, Syncrude Canada Limited, and Canada-Cities Service Limited. The first investment of the Canada Division was the March 8, 1977, private placement loan to the province of Newfoundland and Labrador for $50 million for 21 years at a 10 per cent coupon. Alberta amended the policy on Canada Investment Division loans in the 1979-80 fiscal year to allow all provincial governments to borrow at the interest rate of the province with the strongest creditworthiness, a benefit for provinces who would otherwise be required to borrow at higher interest rates on the open market. The highest credit rating and default benchmark for all other provinces was Ontario Hydro, although neither Ontario Hydro nor the Government of Ontario borrowed from the Fund. The Lougheed government also lifted the ban on loans to the Province of Quebec in September 1979.

=== 1980s ===
Equity Growth of the Alberta Heritage Savings Trust Fund by year

The Alberta Heritage Savings Trust Fund would go through several changes in the early 1980s under Premier Peter Lougheed's Progressive Conservative government. The provincial government created two new investment divisions, the Commercial Investment Division to hold a portfolio of securities, and the Energy Investment Division to make investments in energy capacity across Canada, which was closed shortly afterward owing to the National Energy Program. Eventually, Provincial Treasurer Lou Hyndman announced the province would indefinitely suspend the Canada Investment Division and the possibility of future inter-provincial loans issued by the Heritage Trust Fund. Funds would instead be used on investments in Alberta. The 1982-83 fiscal year marked the first occasion when income generated in the fund was utilized for general government purposes with the transfer of $866 million to Alberta's General Revenue Fund while retaining $1,986 million. Lougheed announced to Albertans that the "rainy day" had arrived and the government intended to put a billion-dollar umbrella over mortgage holders, small businesses, and farmers. In the announcement to address the recession, Lougheed stressed the diversion of funds from the Heritage Trust Fund would only be temporary, and the concept of the fund would remain intact. The Legislature passed the Alberta Heritage Savings Trust Fund Amendment Act, 1983 (Bill 18) which repealed the diversion of 30 per cent of non-renewable resource revenue and provided for the transfer in place for a rate of 15 per cent. The following year, the Fund transferred $1,469 million to general revenue and retained $720 million. Criticism mounted on Peter Lougheed and the Progressive Conservative government from the opposition, with Western Canada Concept leader Gordon Kesler calling the decision "disastrous" and an example of the government's poor financial planning, while Liberal leader Nicholas Taylor called attention to bloated government programs and the optics of a balanced budget before a snap election. Only a month after the announcement the 19th Alberta Legislature was dissolved and an election was called for November 2, 1982.

The Don Getty-led Progressive Conservative government facing deteriorating economic conditions and low oil prices tabled a 1987-88 budget that terminated the 15 per cent non-renewable natural resource deposits into the Heritage Savings Trust Fund and withdrew all interest income from the fund into general revenues. The decision to suspend non-renewable natural resource deposits provided an estimated additional $216 million to the treasury, and an additional $1.4 billion in investment income transfers. The decision in effect capped the fund at $12.7 billion. The $1.4 billion investment income transfer amounted to 19.7 per cent of the province's revenue in 1987, exceeding personal income tax by approximately $230 million.

The opposition to the Alberta Heritage Savings Trust Fund grew in Alberta in the 1980s. A green paper on the fund produced by the opposition Liberal Party claimed the value of the fund was half of what the government claimed as many of the assets could not be reasonably sold or liquidated, such as infrastructure upgrades in provincial parks. The Auditor General raised similar concerns as the fund claimed $2.8 billion on "deemed assets" which could not be liquidated or in any way recovered by the province. Furthermore, opposition MLAs Nicholas Taylor, and Sheldon Chumir claimed the fund created a needless backlash against Albertans in Toronto and Ottawa. As Alberta's economy continued to falter in the late 1980s, calls from both inside and outside Alberta were made to use the Fund to reduce the provincial deficit or pay off provincial debt, however, the Progressive Conservative government was unwilling to reduce the principal of the fund.

=== 1990s ===
Interest Income Transfers for the Alberta Heritage Savings Trust Fund

The Don Getty government faced continued criticism over the handling of the Heritage Savings Trust Fund, particularly the dwindling principal which had seen four consecutive years of reduction by 1991. The funds continued reductions were in part a result of transfers of interest to general revenue and lower earnings from non-interest-bearing investments, in particular the Lloydminster Bi-Provincial Upgrader for heavy oil with Husky Oil and the Government of Saskatchewan, and the Alberta-Pacific Forest Industries pulp mill. By 1993 the government's decisions to reduce and eventually eliminate non-renewable natural resource revenue in 1983 and 1987 combined with the diversion of interest revenue from the fund to general revenue had reached $15.4 billion in diversion, more than double the fund's 1993 value of $15.3 billion.

The Alberta Heritage Savings Trust Fund underwent several changes with Ralph Klein's successful leadership campaign for the Progressive Conservative party and subsequent success in the 1993 Alberta general election. Klein was a staunch believer that private enterprise should dictate market activity and government "should not be in the business of business". The Alberta Heritage Savings Trust Fund was shifted away from strategic business investments to become a savings tool investing for financial return. Klein began the sell-off of the province's 15 per cent ownership in Syncrude in 1993, selling 5 per cent of the enterprise to Murphy Oil for $150 million. Alberta sold its 36 per cent stake in the Alberta Energy Company Ltd. (which eventually became Ovintiv) for $476 million in May 1993, with $183 million returned to the Heritage Savings Trust Fund and the remaining $273 million applied to the provincial debt.

Calls to amend the Alberta Heritage Savings Trust Fund legislation to make the fund "inflation-proof" dated back to the 1990s as successive governments withdrew large portions of the Fund's investment interest. The Alberta Heritage Savings Trust Fund Act (Bill 32) was introduced by the Progressive Conservative government during the fourth session of the 23rd Alberta Legislature and received Royal Assent on May 23, 1996. The Act reorganized the fund, focusing on a period of temporary short-term investments for the benefit of the provincial treasury while transitioning the Fund to long-term investments by 2005. This change was facilitated through a separate "Transition Portfolio" and "Endowment Portfolio", with $10.6 billion of the Fund's $11.8 billion assets placed in the Transition Portfolio. The Transition Portfolio invested primarily in interest-bearing securities for a steady stream of income, while the Endowment Portfolio was split between fixed-income securities and equities both between 35 and 65 per cent of the fund.

=== 2000s ===
The Alberta economy's recovery from the early 1990s recession was jumpstarted by the 2000s energy crisis, which saw the inflation-adjusted price of a barrel of crude oil on NYMEX rise above US$30 in 2003, reached US$60 by 11 August 2005, and peaked at US$147.30 in July 2008. Provincial government revenues from oil and gas royalties grew leading Premier Klein to declare the province "debt free" in July 2004; this included the province having set aside enough money to make payments on outstanding locked-in debts until 2013 when the final payment was made. The growing provincial treasury led to three years of deposits in the Heritage Savings Trust Fund in 2005-06 ($1.75 billion), 2006–07 ($1.25 billion), and 2007–08 ($918 million); the first deposits to the Fund in 19 years.

In 2008, the Government of Alberta created the Alberta Investment Management Corporation (AIMCo), a Crown corporation owned by the provincial government as the asset management firm for the province of Alberta. AIMCo was transferred control of the province's various financial assets, which had previously been managed by a division of the Alberta Ministry of Finance. AIMCo's mandate includes managing the Heritage Savings Trust Fund.

Public criticism reignited in 2009 when it was announced the Heritage Savings Trust Fund had lost $3 billion during the Great Recession, reducing the fund's value to $14 billion. Peter Lougheed – whose government created the fund in 1976 – spoke critically of the fund's management and failure to diversify the Alberta economy, noting the fund was valued at $14 billion in 1985 when he retired from provincial politics. The fund did not recover these 2009 losses for another five years when the market value returned to $17 billion in 2014.

=== 2010s ===
Premier Ed Stelmach formed the Premier's Council for Economic Strategy in 2011. The council's report, Shaping Alberta's Future, proposed several government programs and policies for Alberta to remain competitive into the 2040s. Among the suggested programs was the creation of a Shaping the Future Fund, similar to the Heritage Savings Trust Fund. The proposed Future Fund would be funded through the allocation of all non-renewable resource royalties to make investments in firms, projects, and infrastructure that would encourage economic activity – without necessarily providing a financial return on investment. Despite the recommendations of the report, the Government did not create the Future Fund.

Under Premier Alison Redford and Finance Minister Doug Horner, the 28th Legislature passed the Fiscal Management Act requiring the Government of Alberta to deposit to the Trust Fund five per cent of the first $10 billion of non-renewable resource revenue, 25 per cent of the next $5 billion and 50 per cent of all non-renewable resource revenue in excess of $15 billion. Based on a look back at non-renewable resource revenue between 2000 and 2013, on average, the proposal would have resulted in an additional deposit of $500 million in the Heritage Savings Trust Fund over that period, adding to the amount that would have earned returns on investment.

In the Sovereign Wealth Fund Transparency and Accountability Scoreboard published by the Peterson Institute for International Economics in 2019, the Alberta Heritage Savings Trust Fund was ranked sixth out of 64 sovereign wealth funds worldwide, with a score of 91 out of 100.

=== 2020s ===
In October 2020, the Government of Alberta announced a review of the investment policy for the Heritage Savings Trust Fund. The Trust Fund faced significant losses from a volatility-based investment strategy during the COVID-19 recession. The volatility-based strategy resulted in direct losses of $411 million, which were compounded by other global market losses from the recession, resulting in a total loss in book value of approximately 10 per cent, with a September 2020 month-end value of $17.2 billion. As of year-end 2021, the market value of the Trust Fund had risen to $18.9 billion.

Under Premier Danielle Smith and Finance Minister Nate Horner, the government of Alberta announced a plan to grow the Alberta Heritage Savings Trust Fund to $250 billion by 2050. By focusing on long-term growth and reinvestment, the larger Fund would reduce Alberta's reliance on volatile non-renewable resource revenues.

This plan included legislation to allow the Fund to retain all investment income, as well as add additional funds when the government ran a surplus. Since March 31, 2021, this plan has added $14.1 billion, or 79.3 per cent, up from $17.8 billion in 2021 of the AHSTF to $31.9 billion (as of December 31, 2025).

== Investments ==
The Alberta Heritage Savings Trust Fund has made a number of different investments in Alberta and Canada since its incorporation in 1976. Under the Canada Investment Division, the Fund provided loans to provincial governments and Crown Corporations in the provinces of Newfoundland and Labrador, Nova Scotia, Manitoba, New Brunswick, Prince Edward Island, and Quebec through Hydro Quebec. Loans under the Canada Investment Division grew to $1.9 billion by the time the program was suspended in May 1984. In certain circumstances loans to other Canadian provinces failed to support the goals of the Heritage Savings Trust Fund, as the Province of Quebec used loans to subsidize agricultural development in the early 1980s, leadings to a reduction in Alberta livestock exports to Quebec.

Under Peter Lougheed, $25.5 million from the Heritage Savings Trust Fund was used for the construction of the Kananaskis Country Golf Course as a measure to promote the diversification of the province's economy.

The Alberta Heritage Savings Trust Fund has had a number of investments which brought negative attention to the fund and government. The 1987 loan of $120 million to Millar Western for a Whitecourt pulp mill which the government never received interest or principle payments on despite the province awarding the company several contracts. The province lost $244.2 million on the loan and in 1994 took a 60 per cent ownership stake in Millar Western which was sold in 1996 for $28 million. The Alberta-Pacific pulp mill in Athabasca was provided a $260 million loan in 1991, and following low pulp prices, the Klein government wrote off $155 million in interest and sold the loan in 1998.

The governments of Alberta, Saskatchewan and Canada took severe losses on the Lloydminster Bi-Provincial Upgrader during the early 1990s, the Heritage Savings Trust Fund held 24.17 per cent of the project for a commitment of $404 million. The Lloydminster upgrader came in 28 per cent above budget at $1.63 billion well above budget, and the book value of the plant was listed at $148 million. The Alberta government decided to sell the remaining ownership of the plant in 1994 to be absolved of any more liabilities with the project, selling its share in the plant to the Government of Saskatchewan and Husky Oil for $32 million. The Government of Saskatchewan under Premier Roy Romanow sold their 50 per cent interest in the Lloydminster upgrader to Husky Oil only four years later in 1998 for $310 million, fully recovering Saskatchewan's investment in the project.

=== Fund annual performance and transfers ===
Alberta Heritage Savings Trust Fund transfers ($CAD millions)
Year	Net income	Transfers to Fund			Transfers from Fund			Fund equity (at cost)
Year	Net income	NRR Allocation	Deposits	Adv. ed. endowment	Inv. income transfers	Capital Project exp.	Other transfers	Fund equity (at cost)
1976–77	$88	$2,120	$0	$0	$0	−$36	$0	$2,172
1977–78	$194	$931	$0	$0	$0	−$87	$0	$3,210
1978–79	$294	$1,059	$0	$0	$0	−$132	$0	$4,431
1979–80	$343	$1,332	$0	$0	$0	−$478	$0	$5,628
1980–81	$724	$1,445	$0	$0	$0	−$227	$0	$7,570
1981–82	$1,007	$1,434	$0	$0	$0	−$349	$0	$9,662
1982–83	$1,482	$1,370	$0	$0	−$867	−$296	$0	$11,351
1983–84	$1,467	$720	$0	$0	−$1,469	−$330	$0	$11,739
1984–85	$1,575	$736	$0	$0	−$1,575	−$228	$0	$12,247
1985–86	$1,667	$685	$0	$0	−$1,667	−$240	$0	$12,692
1986–87	$1,445	$217	$0	$0	−$1,445	−$227	$0	$12,682
1987–88	$1,353	$0	$0	$0	−$1,353	−$129	$0	$12,553
1988–89	$1,252	$0	$0	$0	−$1,252	−$155	$0	$12,398
1989–90	$1,244	$0	$0	$0	−$1,244	−$134	$0	$12,264
1990–91	$1,337	$0	$0	$0	−$1,337	−$150	$0	$12,114
1991–92	$1,382	$0	$0	$0	−$1,382	−$84	$0	$12,030
1992–93	$785	$0	$0	$0	−$785	−$84	$0	$11,946
1993–94	$1,103	$0	$0	$0	−$1,103	−$71	$0	$11,875
1994–95	$914	$0	$0	$0	−$914	−$49	$0	$11,826
1995–96	$1,046	$0	$0	$0	−$1,046	$0	$0	$11,826
1996–97	$932	$0	$0	$0	−$756	$0	$0	$12,002
1997–98	$947	$0	$0	$0	−$922	$0	$0	$12,027
1998–99	$932	$0	$0	$0	−$932	$0	$0	$12,027
1999–2000	$1,169	$0	$0	$0	−$939	$0	$0	$12,257
2000–01	$706	$0	$0	$0	−$706	$0	$0	$12,257
2001–02	$206	$0	$0	$0	−$206	$0	$0	$12,257
2002–03	−$894	$0	$0	$0	$0	$0	$0	$11,363
2003–04	$1,133	$0	$0	$0	−$1,133	$0	$0	$11,363
2004–05	$1,092	$0	$0	$0	−$1,092	$0	$0	$11,363
2005–06	$1,397	$0	$1,000	$750	−$1,015	$0	$0	$13,495
2006–07	$1,648	$0	$1,000	$250	−$1,365	$0	$0	$15,028
2007–08	$824	$0	$918	$0	−$358	$0	$0	$16,412
2008–09	−$2,574	$0	$0	$0	$0	$0	$0	$13,838
2009–10	$2,006	$0	$0	$0	−$2,006	$0	$0	$13,838
2010–11	$1,080	$0	$0	$0	−$720	$0	$0	$14,198
2011–12	$798	$0	$0	$0	−$344	$0	$0	$14,652
2012–13	$1,316	$0	$0	$0	−$1,155	$0	$0	$14,813
2013–14	$2,109	$0	$0	$0	−$1,916	$0	$0	$15,006
2014–15	$1,678	$0	$0	$0	−$1,468	$0	−$255	$14,961
2015–16	$1,238	$0	$0	$0	−$1,029	$0	$0	$15,170
2016–17	$2,333	$0	$0	$0	−$2,151	$0	$0	$15,352
2017–18	$1,787	$0	$0	$0	−$1,557	$0	$0	$15,582
2018–19	$937	$0	$0	$0	−$563	$0	$0	$15,956
2019–20	$1,318	$0	$0	$0	−$1,031	$0	$0	$16,243
2020–21	$1,354	$0	$0	$0	−$1,208	$0	$0	$16,389
2021–22	$1,952	$0	$0	$0	−$1,247	$0	$0	$17,094
2022–23	−$114	$0	$753	$0	$1,247	$0	$0	$18,980
2023–24	$1,892	$0	$0	$0	$0	$0	$0	$20,872
2024-25	$1,871	$0	$2,000	$0	$0	$0	$0	$24,743
Total	$51,775	$12,049	$5,671	$1,000	−$42,011	−$3,486	−$255	$24,743

== Criticisms ==
The Heritage Savings Trust Fund has proven to be a target of criticism from a wide spectrum of authors and organizations representing many positions on social and economic scales.

=== Comparison to Norway's and Alaska's non-renewable resource funds ===
The Alberta Heritage Savings Trust Fund often draws comparisons to Government Pension Fund Global of Norway, the US$2.293 trillion (as of June 2026) sovereign wealth fund established in 1990 to invest surplus revenues of the Norwegian petroleum sector. Norway's fund has grown significantly; over the period from 2002 to 2017, it saw a 13-fold increase in value. Furthermore the Norwegian government is only able to withdraw up to 3 per cent of the fund's value each year, and the first such withdrawal did not take place until 2016.

In their August 2015 contrast for The Globe and Mail between the Alberta Heritage Savings Trust Fund and the Norwegian Government Pension Fund Global, Brian Milner and Jeff Lewis wrote that Norway parks 100 per cent of its non-renewable resource revenue from royalties and dividends in a fund that is barred from investing within the domestic economy, while the AHSTF had invested heavily in Alberta.

Reports by the Canadian Centre for Policy Alternatives and the Fraser Institute concluded that Alberta should be saving more of its non-renewable resource revenues. The report noted that since 1980, the non-renewable resource revenues in Alberta has generated almost $190 billion, but the value of the Heritage Fund was only $17.3 billion in 2014. After 1987, non-renewable resource revenue was no longer added to the Heritage Fund. The Fraser Institute report compared the AHSTF to Norway's fund and Alaska's Alaska Permanent Fund, and argued that Alberta's was significantly "smaller than others because of its relative under-funding and chronic withdrawals of most income from the fund." Alaska for example continued to deposit 25 per cent of its non-renewable resource revenue from 1982 to 2011 and Norway contributed 100 percent. For the same 1982 to 2011 period, the AHSTF had added CA$9.1 billion (equivalent to $12.5 billion in 2025); the report noted if Alberta had followed the Alaskan formula, by 2011 the AHSTF would have had an increase of $42.4 billion (equivalent to $58.1 billion in 2025), while under the Norway formula it would have increased $121.9 billion (equivalent to $167.1 billion in 2025).

In its annual report on the Canadian economy in February 2013, the Washington-based International Monetary Fund (IMF) urged Canada, and resource-rich provinces like Alberta and Quebec to "better manage boom-and-bust commodities cycles by stashing away more tax revenue in good times". IMF mission chief for Canada, Roberto Cardarelli, suggested that Norway, with the largest sovereign wealth fund, is an example Canada should follow; the suggestion to Canada missed that, unlike Norway, resource royalties are a provincial level revenue stream, not a federal level revenue stream.

Renewed criticism from the Frasier Institute, in a 2021 report, contributed to the Government of Alberta studying methods to stop the decades-long deflation of the AHSTF. This led to a plan in fiscal 2023-24 to grow the Fund to $250 billion by 2050.

=== Ineffective management ===
In 2013 Madelaine Drohan, author of the Canadian International Council report entitled The 9 Habits of Highly Effective Resource Economies: Lessons for Canada,and a Canadian correspondent for The Economist, echoed the IMF call for "stabilization funds", arguing that every province in Canada should "(l)earn from Alberta’s mistake" and consider establishing properly managed sovereign wealth funds, as global peers have done, and treat non-renewable resource revenue as "capital to be saved and invested, rather than income to be spent." She added that in provinces like Alberta where the Fund already exists, it "should be implemented with a great deal more rigour." Drohan warned in 2013 against the "political temptation" to "raid" the Fund and offered the Canadian Pension Plan Investment Board (CPPIB), a Crown corporation, the largest pension fund in Canada, as a model. By March 2015 the CPPIB fund had grown to $219 billion and made a 16.5 per cent rate-of-return in 2013.

Max Fawcett, the editor of Alberta Oil magazine, warned that the newly proposed Alberta Future Fund from the Premier's Council for Economic Strategy, which was set to receive $200 million a year to "support big-picture projects" and the two "new innovation endowments" announced by Finance Minister Doug Horner in the 2014 budget, would be funded by raiding the Alberta Heritage Savings Trust Fund. There were no new savings.

The 2015 Fraser Institute report titled Fumbling the Alberta Advantage, noted that between 2005 and 2014, and adjusted for inflation, the province of Alberta received $101.3 billion in resource revenues. The authors argued that $49.2 billion on programs above inflation and population growth—a deposit of 25 per cent of resource revenues equaling $25.3 billion, into the Heritage Fund would not have been unreasonable had program spending been more carefully controlled. The Fraser Institute criticized the province's deposited of $4.5 billion during that period which equalled 4.5 per cent of all resource revenues during that period.

== See also ==
- Alberta Investment Management Corporation, the Crown corporation responsible for managing the Fund's investments
- Alaska Permanent Fund
- Government Pension Fund of Norway
- Alberta Heritage Savings Trust Fund
