= BGS =

BGS may stand for:

== Art and entertainment ==
- Bee Gees, a rock and disco group
- Beautiful Game Studios, a computer game developer
- Bethesda Game Studios, a video game developer
- Brasil Game Show, yearly Brazilian video game convention
- Bunny Girl Senpai, Japanese light novel series

== Science and technology ==
- Below ground surface, in scientific reports; see Australian Aboriginal prehistoric sites
- Baller–Gerold syndrome
- Berkeley gas-filled separator, an instrument that uses a magnetic deflection system filled with gas at low pressure; see Isotopes of flerovium
- Braunstein-Ghosh-Severini Entropy, of a network
- British Geological Survey, an organisation in the United Kingdom
- British Geriatrics Society, the professional body of specialists involved with health care of the elderly in the United Kingdom

== Schools ==
- Bandon Grammar School, an independent, fee-paying school in Bandon, County Cork
- Bangor Grammar School, a voluntary school in Bangor, County Down
- Bankstown Grammar School, in Australia
- Bedford Girls' School, an independent grammar school in Bedford, England
- Beverley Grammar School, a state grammar school in Beverley, England
- Bexley Grammar School, a co-educational grammar school in Bexley, England
- Boston Grammar School, in Boston, England
- Bourne Grammar School, in Bourne, England
- Bradford Grammar School, an independent grammar school in Bradford, England
- Brisbane Grammar School, one of the oldest high schools in Queensland, Australia
- Brighton Grammar School, in Melbourne, Australia
- Bristol Grammar School, an independent grammar school in Bristol, England
- Burnham Grammar School, a co-educational grammar school in Burnham, Buckinghamshire
- Bury Grammar School, an independent grammar school in Greater Manchester, England

== Transport ==
- Begusarai railway station, Bihar, India, Indian Railways station code
- Bugis MRT station, Singapore, MRT station abbreviation

== Other uses ==
- Bachelor of General Studies, an interdisciplinary undergraduate-level academic degree
- BackGround Sound, such as in video games and anime
- Beta Gamma Sigma, a business honor society
- Bouquet, Garcin & Schivre, a French electric car manufactured between 1899 and 1906
- Brigadier General Staff, the chief staff officer in a British army Corps
- Bundesgrenzschutz, the German Federal Border Guard, now called the German Federal Police
