= British Gas (disambiguation) =

British Gas may refer to:

- British Gas plc (1987–1997), the former monopoly gas supplier in the United Kingdom
  - Centrica, a multinational utility company founded in 1997, which currently uses the British Gas brand name in the UK
  - BG Group, a global oil and gas company founded in 1997, which currently uses the British Gas brand name outside the UK
