= OMERS =

Canadian pension fund

Ontario Municipal Employees Retirement System
- Trade name: OMERS
- Type: Statutory corporation
- Industry: Pension fund
- Founded: April 18, 1962; 64 years ago
- Headquarters: EY Tower; 900-100 Adelaide Street West; Toronto, Ontario; M5H 0E2
- Area served: Participating employers and employees in Ontario, Canada
- Key people: Blake Hutcheson (CEO); George Cooke (Board chair, Administration Corporation); Max Cananzi (Board chair, Sponsors Corporation)
- Net income: C$8.2 billion (December 31, 2025)
- Total assets: C$151.6 billion (June 30, 2026) (net assets)
- Owner: The participating employers and employees of the OMERS pension plans
- Divisions: OMERS Infrastructure; OMERS Capital Markets; OMERS Private Equity; Oxford Properties
- Website: omers.com

The Ontario Municipal Employees Retirement System (OMERS) is a Canadian public pension fund, headquartered in Toronto, Ontario. OMERS is a defined benefit, jointly sponsored, multi-employer public pension plan created on April 18, 1962 by Ontario provincial statute to administer retirement benefits and manage pension investment funds of local government employees in the Canadian province of Ontario. OMERS members are union or non-union employed by municipalities, school boards, transit systems, local electrical distribution companies, police service boards, fire fighting and paramedic services, children's aid societies and associated local agencies, boards and commissions.

== Organization ==
OMERS is governed by the Ontario Municipal Employee's Retirement System Act, 2006, an Ontario law which superseded the older Ontario Municipal Employees Retirement System Act. Members contribute 9% of their salary below the Year's Maximum Pensionable Earnings (YMPE), and 14.6% on income over YMPE.

Under the 2006 law, OMERS is composed of two statutory corporations. In 2019, OMERS ventures launched a $315M European Venture fund, a fully owned subsidiary of OMERS Ventures led by Managing Partner Harry Briggs.

OMERS is a partner of the World Economic Forum.

OMERS is one of Canada's top eight pension funds, nicknamed the "Maple 8" or "Maple Revolutionaries."

== Recent and current operations ==
In March 2017, OMERS acquired a stake in Kemble, the UK holding company of Thames Water. The deeply-indebted water business became embroiled in a financial crisis from 2023, and in May 2024, OMERS, then Thames' biggest shareholder, issued a "full write-down" of its 31.7% stake in Kemble, signaling the shares were now worth nothing.

In November 2023, OMERS announced the acquisition of a 5% indirect stake in Maple Leaf Sports & Entertainment (MLSE), the parent company of the Toronto Maple Leafs and the Toronto Raptors, for $400 million. The stake was purchased through a 20% direct investment in Kilmer Sports Inc (KSI), which is owned by MLSE Chairman Larry Tanenbaum. After the transaction, Tanenbaum will continue as chairman, holding an 80% stake in KSI, while OMERS will function purely as a financial investor without involvement in the operational decisions of MLSE or its teams.

As of 2023, 25% of OMERS' investments are in Canada. Its largest investment is in Bruce Power.

The retail real estate portfolio includes Kingsway Mall and Southcentre Mall in Alberta; Hillcrest Mall, Scarborough Town Centre, Square One Shopping Centre, Upper Canada Mall, and Yorkdale Shopping Centre in Ontario. OMERS has over 6,000 residential rental units in Vancouver, the Greater Toronto Area, and Montreal; 15 million square feet of office space in Vancouver, Toronto and Calgary; and, is invested in hotels across Canada.

In July 2024, Bloomberg News reported some Canadian pension funds were moving away from commercial real estate following recent challenges. Although OMERS was one of the funds that reported a loss in this portfolio, the CEO of OMERS, Blake Hutcheson, announced they would continue with their strategy.

OMERS began investing in electric vehicle battery developer and manufacturer, Northvolt, in 2021. A loss on its almost $450 million investment after Northvolt's bankruptcy, was reported by the Globe and Mail in November 2024.

== Financial position ==
As of the end of 2025, OMERS had $145.5 billion in net assets available for benefits, against pension obligations of $149.5 billion, and a deficit of $6.1 billion before voluntary contributions. The pension regularly uses a 5-year smoothed average as to how well it can fulfil its pension obligations, and as of 2025, its 5-year smoothed funded ratio is 99%, representing a near-full ability to meet pension obligations if liquidated.

OMERS serves over 1,000 participating employers and more than 650,000 active, deferred and retired employees.

== See also ==
- Caisse de dépôt et placement du Québec
- CPP Investment Board
- Ontario Teachers' Pension Plan
- Public Sector Pension Investment Board
- Alberta Investment Management Corporation
- OPTrust

== Sources ==
- Profile of OMERS Corporation. Bloomberg. 14:18, 15 November 2021 (UTC)
