= La Caisse =

Canadian institutional investment company

Caisse de dépôt et placement du Québec

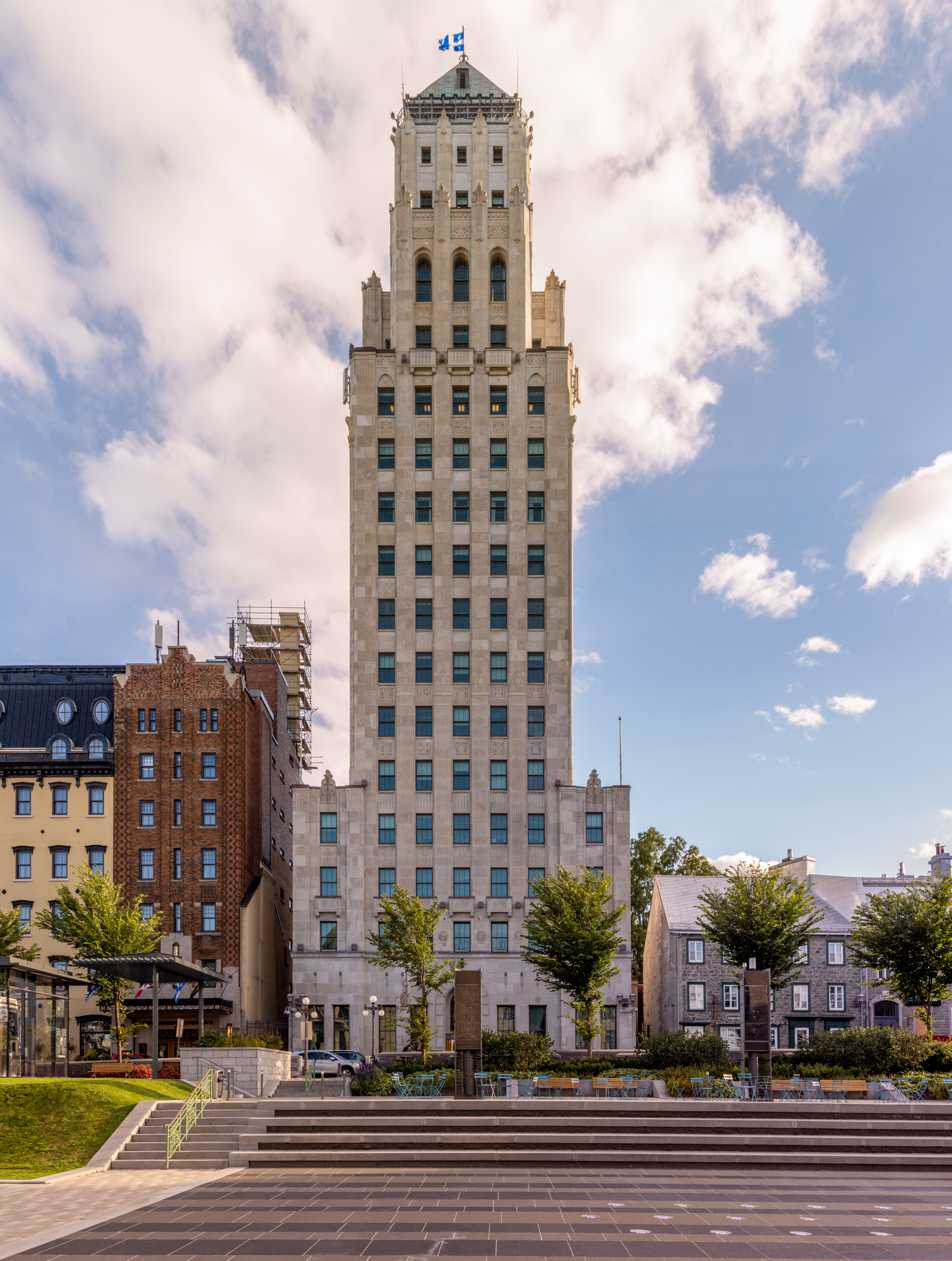
- Headquarters in Quebec City's Price Building
- Trade name: La Caisse
- Type: Crown corporation
- Industry: Pension fund
- Founded: July 15, 1965; 61 years ago
- Headquarters: 65 Saint Anne Street; Quebec City, Quebec, Canada
- Key people: Charles Émond (CEO)
- Total assets: ▲CA$473.3 billion (December 31, 2024)
- Number of employees: 890 (as of December 31, 2016, excluding its subsidiaries)
- Subsidiaries: CDPQ Infra; Ivanhoé Cambridge; Otéra Capital
- Website: lacaisse.com

The Caisse de dépôt et placement du Québec (Note: French pronunciation: [kɛːs də depo e plasmɑ̃ dy kebɛk]) (Note: English: Quebec Deposit and Investment Fund) (CDPQ; operating as La Caisse) is an institutional investor that manages several public and parapublic pension plans and insurance programs in the Canadian province of Quebec. It was established on July 15, 1965 by an act of the National Assembly, under the government of Jean Lesage, as part of the Quiet Revolution, a period of social and political change in Quebec. It is the second-largest pension fund in Canada, after the Canada Pension Plan Investment Board. It was created to manage the funds of the newly created Quebec Pension Plan, a public pension plan that aimed to provide financial security for Quebecers in retirement. The CDPQ's mandate was to invest the funds prudently and profitably while also contributing to Quebec's economic development. As of December 31, 2024, the CDPQ managed assets of C$473 billion, invested in Canada and elsewhere. The CDPQ is headquartered in Quebec City at the Price Building and has its main business office in Montreal at the Édifice Jacques-Parizeau.

The CDPQ is a institution that plays a vital role in the economic and social development of Quebec and Canada. It is one of the largest and most diversified institutional investors in the world, investing in sectors including private equity, fixed income, real estate, infrastructure, and renewable energy, in Canada and abroad. It also supports Quebec-based companies with growth potential and contributes to the creation of jobs and wealth in the province.

Over the years, the CDPQ has expanded its scope and scale, managing the funds of other public and parapublic pension and insurance plans, such as the Government and Public Employees Retirement Plan (RREGOP), the Pension Plan of Management Personnel (PPMP), and the Fonds d'assurance automobile du Québec. It has also diversified its portfolio, investing in different asset classes and markets around the world. It has established offices in several countries, such as the United States, Mexico, Brazil, France, India, China, Singapore, and Australia. It has also acquired or partnered with several subsidiaries, such as Ivanhoé Cambridge (real estate), CDPQ Infra (infrastructure), and Otéra Capital (financing).

CDPQ is one of Canada's top eight pension funds, nicknamed the "Maple 8" or "Maple Revolutionaries."

== History ==
=== Creation and early years (1965–1979) ===
The CDPQ was established by an act of the National Assembly on July 15, 1965, under the government of Jean Lesage, as part of the Quiet Revolution, a period of social and political change in Quebec. Its initial role was to manage the funds of the newly created Quebec Pension Plan, a public pension plan that aimed to provide financial security for Quebecers in retirement. The CDPQ's mandate was to invest the funds prudently and profitably while also contributing to Quebec's economic development.

In its early years, the CDPQ focused on building a bond portfolio that included predominantly Quebec government and Hydro-Québec securities. It made its first equity investment in Alcan Aluminium in 1967 and its first commercial mortgage loans in the same year. In 1971, it created the private investments portfolio, which included investments in Quebec companies.

=== Diversification and expansion (1980–1999) ===
In the 1980s, the CDPQ entered into international markets and the real estate sector. It made its first transactions in global equities exchanges in 1983 and its first international private equity investment in Compagnie financière Martin Maurel, in France, in 1984. It also acquired its first office building, Place Delta in Sainte-Foy, in 1980, and its first international real estate acquisition, Centre de conférence Albert-Borschette in Brussels, in 1993.

In the 1990s, the CDPQ diversified its real estate portfolio and increased its equity allocation. It acquired the real estate assets of the Steinberg grocery chain in 1989 and merged its real estate subsidiary, Ivanhoé, with Cambridge Shopping Centres in 2001, creating Ivanhoé Cambridge. It also obtained a legislative change in 1997 that increased its allowable equity allocation from 40% to 70% of its assets. It also moved into infrastructure investment in 1999, with the construction of Highway 407 in Toronto.

=== Crisis and recovery (2000–2009) ===
In the 2000s, the CDPQ faced the worst financial crisis since the stock market crash of 1929, which resulted in a loss of $42.5 billion in 2008. Following the crisis, the CDPQ adopted a series of measures to increase its effectiveness, refocus on its core competencies, and strengthen its risk management in order to better sustain long-term yields. It also launched a major plan to support Quebec businesses in 2009. It adopted a responsible investing policy in 2004 and signed the UN's Principles for Responsible Investment in 2006. In 2009, Otéra Capital, a subsidiary of the CDPQ, was created to act as a leader in commercial real estate debt across North America. Otéra Capital offers innovative financing solutions for various real estate sectors, such as office, retail, industrial, multifamily, hospitality, and seniors' housing.

=== Growth and innovation (2010–present) ===
In the 2010s, the CDPQ accelerated its pace of growth and expansion in Canada and abroad. In 2013 it created the Global Quality Equity Portfolio, which followed a new investment philosophy that favoured total returns, in-depth research, and investments in high-quality assets, anchored in the real economy. It combined all its real estate subsidiaries under one banner, Ivanhoé Cambridge, in 2011. It also established offices in several countries, such as the United States, Mexico, Brazil, France, India, China, Singapore, and Australia. In 2015, CDPQ Infra, a subsidiary of the CDPQ, was created to act as a principal contractor for public infrastructure projects. CDPQ Infra is responsible for all phases of a project: planning, financing, execution and operation.

In a September 28, 2021, press release, the CDPQ announced its 2021 climate strategy, which included divesting the remaining $3.9 billion currently held in oil company assets, which represented 1% of its investment portfolio, by 2022. According to the statement, the CDPQ was responding "to the markets, to science, and to the will of Quebecers who do not want their money to fuel the climate crisis."

As of June 30, 2023, the CDPQ managed assets of C$424 billion, invested in sectors such as private equity, fixed income, real estate, infrastructure, and renewable energy in Canada and elsewhere. It also supported Quebec-based companies with growth potential and contributed to the creation of jobs and wealth in the province. It strived to generate positive impacts for society and the environment. In 2022, Global SWF, a publication that covers sovereign wealth funds and other long-term public investors, awarded the CDPQ its 2022 Fund of the Year award. The next year, Infrastructure Investor magazine, which focuses on the global infrastructure investment market, ranked the CDPQ the top institutional investor in infrastructure based on asset size in the Global Investor 50 list.

Since June 2025, CDPQ has been operating under the name La Caisse, alongside dropping the name Ivanhoé Cambridge for La Caisse for its real estate portfolio.

== Mandate and independence ==
In 2005, article 4 of CDPQ's founding statute was amended to make the institution's mandate explicit:

4.1. The mission of the Fund is to receive moneys on deposit as provided by law and manage them with a view to achieving optimal return on capital within the framework of depositors' investment policies while at the same time contributing to Québec's economic development.

In June 2015, the CDPQ statute was further amended to specify that CDPQ "acts with full independence in accordance with this Act."

== Growth and strategy ==
CDPQ has five investment priorities: optimal performance, Québec economy, worldwide presence, sustainable investing, and technology.

CDPQ has expanded its global presence by opening offices in key markets such as New York, London, Singapore, Mexico City, São Paulo, Paris, New Delhi, and Sydney.

== Involvement in major infrastructure projects ==
=== Réseau express métropolitain (REM), greater Montreal ===
The Réseau express métropolitain (REM) is a public infrastructure project in greater Montreal that was proposed by the CDPQ at the request of the government of Quebec. In 2015, the CDPQ proposed a new model for infrastructure projects to the Quebec government, based on its expertise and financial capacity. It then created a subsidiary, CDPQ Infra, to manage major public infrastructure projects in Quebec and abroad. The REM is the first project of CDPQ Infra, which owns and operates the fully electric and automated light rail system that will serve greater Montreal. CDPQ Infra is responsible for all aspects of the REM, from design and construction to financing and maintenance, as well as the procurement of rolling stock and systems. CDPQ Infra also follows environmental and social standards and communicates and consults with the public and stakeholders. The REM project has several expected outcomes, including improving the mobility of commuters, reducing greenhouse gas emissions, creating thousands of jobs, supporting the development of electric transportation, and stimulating economic and real estate growth. Construction on the REM began in April 2018 and is planned to be completed by 2027. The first trains operated in 2023 between Brossard and Central Station. The REM will be one of the longest automated metro lines in the world, with a 67-km route and 26 stations. It will connect downtown, the South Shore, the North Shore, the West Island, and Montréal–Trudeau International Airport.

=== Canada Line, Metro Vancouver ===
The CDPQ was part of a consortium that developed and operated the Canada Line, a public transit infrastructure project in Metro Vancouver. The consortium, named InTransit BC, also included AtkinsRéalis (formerly SNC-Lavalin) and other infrastructure and transportation companies. The Canada Line project started in 2004, with the goal of providing transit options connecting downtown Vancouver to Vancouver International Airport and Richmond. InTransit BC won the public-private partnership contract for the Canada Line project. The consortium provided financial backing and expertise in infrastructure development and transportation. The project involved the construction of a new SkyTrain line, which included tunnelling under the Fraser River and various stations along the route. The Canada Line opened to the public in 2009, on time and within budget. It has become an important part of the Greater Vancouver transit system, facilitating the movement of people and goods while contributing to the region's sustainable growth and development.

== International investments ==
The CDPQ has investments across different sectors and geographies. Here are a few examples:

=== Public companies ===
| Continent | Country | Investment | Industry/Sector | Stake | Largest shareholder | Source |
|---|---|---|---|---|---|---|
| North America | Canada | AtkinsRéalis | Engineering consulting | 19.97% | Yes | |
| North America | Canada | WSP Global | Engineering consulting | 18.06% | Yes | |
| Europe | France | Alstom | Transportation | 18% | Yes | |
| North America | Canada | Boralex | Energy | 12.54% | Yes | |
| North America | Canada | CGI | Information technology consulting | 11.70% | Yes | |
| North America | Canada | Alimentation Couche-Tard | Convenience Store | 5.398% | No | |
| North America | Canada | National Bank of Canada | Financial Services | 2.778% | No | |
| North America | Canada | Bombardier | Transportation | 2.697% | No | |
| North America | Canada | BCE | Telecommunication | 2.521% | No | |
| North America | Canada | Canadian National Railway | Transportation | 1.901% | No | |

=== Infrastructure ===
| Continent | Country | Investment | Stake | Source |
|---|---|---|---|---|
| Europe | Belgium | Eurostar Group | 19.31% | |
| Oceania | Australia | Sydney Metro | 24.9% | |
| Europe | UK | Heathrow Airport | 12.62% | |
| Oceania | Australia | Port of Brisbane | 26.7% | |
| Oceania | Australia | TransGrid | 24.99% | |
| South America | Brazil | Transportadora Associada de Gás S.A. | 50% | |
| Europe | UK | Sizewell C nuclear power station | 20% | |

=== Real estate ===
| Continent | Country | Investment | Industry/Sector | Source |
|---|---|---|---|---|
| North America | United States | IDI LOGISTICS | Logistics | |
| North America | Canada | CIBC Square | Offices | |
| Europe | France | Tours Duo | Offices | |
| Oceania | Australia | LOGOS | Logistics | |

== Awards and recognition ==
=== Terra Carta Seal (2023) - Sustainable Markets Initiative ===
Source:

=== 2022 Fund of the Year - Global SWF ===
Source:

=== Sustainable finance - World Benchmarking Alliance ===
The CDPQ ranked first among 59 global pension funds in the rankings.

=== World's Largest Institutional Investor in Infrastructure - Global Investor 50 ===
The CDPQ ranked first in the 2023 edition of the list.

== Organization ==
The CDPQ's board of directors can have up to 15 members, two-thirds of whom must be independent. It is composed of its chair, the president and CEO, depositor representatives, and independent members. The board is responsible for establishing the CDPQ's main orientations and ensuring that the CDPQ adheres with all legislative and regulatory requirements. The position of chair of the board of directors is separate from that of president and chief executive officer.

The Quebec government appoints members of the board of directors, upon consultation with the board. The CDPQ's board of directors has defined a profile of expertise and experience required for its independent directors.

The executive committee is composed of the president and CEO and the senior officers of the CDPQ's various sectors.

=== Subsidiaries ===
The CDPQ has three subsidiaries: Ivanhoé Cambridge, Otéra Capital, and CDPQ Infra. The subsidiaries' headquarters are located in the Jacques-Parizeau building in Montreal.

==== Ivanhoé Cambridge ====
Ivanhoé Cambridge is the real estate subsidiary of the CDPQ. It aims to invest in real estate assets including office space, shopping centres, and multi-residential buildings. Some of its biggest projects include CIBC Square in Toronto and Tours Duo in Paris.

==== Otéra Capital ====
Otéra Capital, another subsidiary of the CDPQ, provides commercial real estate debt financing across North America. It has a portfolio of over C$29 billion in loans as of December 31, 2022. It offers various financing options for different real estate sectors, including office, industrial, retail, multi-family, hospitality, and seniors' housing. Otéra Capital also has a strong commitment to environmental, social, and governance (ESG) principles and has recently granted its first green loan to a sustainable office building project in Toronto. Its headquarters are located in Montreal, and it has offices in Toronto, Vancouver, New York, and Los Angeles.

==== CDPQ Infra ====
CDPQ Infra, a third subsidiary of the CDPQ, is dedicated to the development and management of infrastructure. At the time of its creation, CDPQ Infra was mandated by the Couillard government to evaluate two public transit projects for Greater Montreal: a public transit system on the Samuel-de-Champlain Bridge and a public transit system for the West Island (between downtown Montreal, Pierre-Elliot-Trudeau International Airport and the West Island).

On 22 April 2016, CDPQ Infra unveiled plans for a new public transit project, the Réseau express métropolitain (REM). The REM will link downtown Montréal, the South Shore, the West Island (Sainte-Anne-de-Bellevue), the North Shore (Deux-Montagnes), and the airport through a unified, electrically powered and fully automated 67-km light metro system. The network represents an investment of approximately $5.5 billion, of which CDPQ Infra is committing $3 billion as the majority shareholder.

On March 8, 2017, General Electric said it had agreed to sell GE Water for around US$3.4 billion to Suez Environnement in France and the CDPQ.

On February 19, 2025, CDPQ Infra was selected by the government of Canada as part of a consortium of companies that will develop high speed rail in Canada as part of the codevelopment phase with crown-corporation Alto (previously VIA-HFR). The consortium includes CDPQ Infra, AtkinsRéalis, SYSTRA Canada, Keolis Canada, Air Canada and SNCF Voyageurs.

== Investments ==
=== Type ===
CDPQ's portfolio is divided into four main categories of assets:

- Fixed income
  - Bonds
  - Estate debt
  - Short-term investments
  - Long-term bonds
- Inflation-sensitive investments
  - Real estate
  - Infrastructure
  - Real-return bonds
- Equity
  - Global quality equity
  - Canadian equity
  - Emerging markets equity
  - U.S. equity
  - EAFE equity
  - Private equity
- Other investments

=== Geographic diversification ===
The following table shows the geographic exposure of the CDPQ's overall portfolio, based on the country where the main place of business of the company or issuer is located or, in the case of real estate, the geographic location of properties:

| Region | 2022 | 2018 | 2017 | 2016 | 2015 | 2014 |
|---|---|---|---|---|---|---|
| Canada | 25% | 36% | 42% | 41% | 46.0% | 52.6% |
| United States | 40% | 30% | 28% | 31% | 26.5% | 21.8% |
| Europe | 16% | 14% | 13% | 13% | 13.8% | 14.1% |
| Emerging markets | 16% | 14% | 11% | 9% | 7.7% | 6.7% |
| Other regions | 3% | 6% | 6% | 6% | 6.0% | 4.8% |
| Total | 100% | 100% | 100% | 100% | 100% | 100% |

== Main depositors ==
The eight largest depositors, listed below, represented 96.4% of the CDPQ's net assets as at December 31, 2022.

| Depositor | Net assets as of December 31, 2022 (billions CAD) |
|---|---|
| Government of Quebec Ministry of Finance | 107.5 |
| Quebec Pension Plan (QPP) (French: Régie des Rentes du Québec; RRQ) | 106.8 |
| Government and Public Employees Retirement Plan | 83.3 |
| Supplemental Pension Plan for Employees of the Québec Construction Industry | 28.5 |
| Commission de la Santé et de la Sécurité du Travail (CSST), Québec's occupational safety and health agency | 19.3 |
| Government of Quebec Ministry of Finance (Generations Fund) | 17.8 |
| Société de l'assurance automobile du Québec (SAAQ) (English: Quebec Automobile Insurance Corporation) | 13.4 |
| Pension Plan of Management Personnel | 10.9 |
| Total | 387.5 |

== Performance ==
Changes in CDPQ's net assets since inception
| Year | Net assets as of December 31 | Rate of return (annual) |
|---|---|---|
| 1966 | $0,2 B | - |
| 1967 | $0,4 B | 100% |
| 1968 | $0,7 B | 75% |
| 1969 | $1,0 B | 42,86% |
| 1970 | $1,3 B | 30% |
| 1971 | $1,7 B | 30,77% |
| 1972 | $2,2 B | 29,41% |
| 1973 | $2,6 B | 18,18% |
| 1974 | $3,2 B | 23,08% |
| 1975 | $4,1 B | 28,13% |
| 1976 | $4,9 B | 19,51% |
| 1977 | $6,0 B | 22,45% |
| 1978 | $7,9 B | 31,67% |
| 1979 | $9,2 B | 16,46% |
| 1980 | $10,9 B | 18,48% |
| 1981 | $11,4 B | 4,59% |
| 1982 | $16,0 B | 40,35% |
| 1983 | $18,0 B | 12,5% |
| 1984 | $20,1 B | 11,67% |
| 1985 | $22,4 B | 11,44% |
| 1986 | $24,9 B | 11,16% |
| 1987 | $27,3 B | 9,64% |
| 1988 | $29,9 B | 9,52% |
| 1989 | $33,3 B | 11,37% |
| 1990 | $35,7 B | 7,21% |
| 1991 | $38,1 B | 6,72% |
| 1992 | $41,3 B | 8,4% |
| 1993 | $47,1 B | 14,04% |
| 1994 | $45,3 B | -3,82% |
| 1995 | $51,4 B | 13,47% |
| 1996 | $57,4 B | 11,67% |
| 1997 | $64,1 B | 11,67% |
| 1998 | $69,0 B | 7,64% |
| 1999 | $81,5 B | 18,12% |
| 2000 | $88,3 B | 8,34% |
| 2001 | $85,3 B | -3,4% |
| 2002 | $77,7 B | -8,91% |
| 2003 | $89,4 B | 15,06% |
| 2004 | $102,4 B | 14,54% |
| 2005 | $122,2 B | 19,34% |
| 2006 | $143,5 B | 17,43% |
| 2007 | $155,4 B | 8,29% |
| 2008 | $120,1 B | -22,73% |
| 2009 | $131,6 B | 9,58% |
| 2010 | $151,7 B | 15,27% |
| 2011 | $159,0 B | 4,81% |
| 2012 | $176,2 B | 10,82% |
| 2013 | $200,1 B | 13,57% |
| 2014 | $225,9 B | 12,89% |
| 2015 | $248,0 B | 9,8% |
| 2016 | $270,7 B | 9,15% |
| 2017 | $298,5 B | 10,27% |
| 2018 | $309,5 B | 3,68% |
| 2019 | $340,1 B | 9,88% |
| 2020 | $365,5 B | 7,47% |
| 2021 | $419,8 B | 14,85% |
| 2022 | $401,9 B | -4,26% |

== Controversy over private security investments ==
The CDPQ has been criticized for investing in the private security industry. It became the main shareholder of Allied Universal and also invested in CAE Inc. Critics have derided the poor economic value of these choices. and the social and ethical problems that surround the industry. The holding of Allied Universal by the CDPQ became more of a problem after the company acquired G4S, a firm that has been implicated in many controversies that led most public pension funds to divest from it. G4S holds parts of Policity Corporation, a company that operate Israel's National Police Academy. The global ESG rating of G4S in 2019 was C−.

== See also ==
- CPP Investment Board
- Public Sector Pension Investment Board
