= List of places in Pennsylvania: Pa–Pi =

This list of cities, towns, unincorporated communities, counties, and other recognized places in the U.S. state of Pennsylvania also includes information on the number and names of counties in which the place lies, and its lower and upper Zip Code bounds, if applicable.

Name of place	Number of counties	Principal county	Lower zip code	Upper zip code
P and O V Junction	1	Allegheny County	15136	
P and W Patch	1	Washington County	15312	
Packer Township	1	Carbon County		
Packerton	1	Carbon County	18235	
Packerton Junction	1	Carbon County		
Paddytown	1	Somerset County		
Pageville	1	Erie County	16401	
Paine	1	Elk County		
Paint	1	Somerset County	15963	
Paint Creek	1	Cambria County		
Paint Mills	1	Clarion County		
Paint Township	1	Clarion County		
Paint Township	1	Somerset County		
Painter Run	1	Tioga County	16946	
Painters Crossroads	1	Delaware County		
Paintersville	1	Mifflin County	17044	
Paintersville	1	Westmoreland County	15672	
Paintertown	1	Westmoreland County	15642	
Paisley	1	Greene County	15320	
Palanka	1	Washington County		
Palestine	1	Clearfield County	16858	
Paletown	1	Bucks County	18944	
Pallas	1	Snyder County		
Palm	1	Montgomery County	18070	
Palmdale	1	Dauphin County	17033	
Palmer	1	Crawford County	16406	
Palmer	1	Fayette County		
Palmer	1	Northampton County	18043	
Palmer Heights	1	Northampton County	18042	
Palmer Township	1	Northampton County		
Palmerton	1	Carbon County	18071	
Palmerton	1	Indiana County	15716	
Palmerton East	1	Carbon County	18071	
Palmyra	1	Lebanon County	17078	
Palmyra Township	1	Pike County		
Palmyra Township	1	Wayne County		
Palo Alto	1	Bedford County	15545	
Palo Alto	1	Schuylkill County	17901	
Palomino Farms	1	Bucks County	18976	
Pancake	1	Centre County		
Pancoast	1	Jefferson County	15851	
Panic	1	Jefferson County	15851	
Panorama	1	Centre County	16801	
Pansy	1	Jefferson County	15864	
Pansy Hill	1	Lebanon County	17042	
Panther	1	Clinton County		
Panther	1	Pike County	18445	
Paoli	1	Chester County	19301	
Paper Mill	1	Columbia County		
Paper Mills	1	Montgomery County	19009	
Paperville	1	Chester County		
Paradise	1	Lancaster County	17562	
Paradise	1	Schuylkill County	17963	
Paradise Falls	1	Monroe County	18326	
Paradise Furnace	1	Huntingdon County		
Paradise Township	1	Lancaster County		
Paradise Township	1	Monroe County		
Paradise Township	1	York County		
Paradise Valley	1	Monroe County	18326	
Parcel Post	1	Allegheny County	15233	
Parcel Post	1	Berks County	19611	
Pardee	1	Clearfield County	16866	
Pardee	1	Union County		
Pardeesville	1	Luzerne County	18243	
Pardoe	1	Mercer County	16137	
Pardus	1	Jefferson County	15851	
Paris	1	Washington County	15021	
Park	1	Westmoreland County	15690	
Park Crest	1	Schuylkill County	18214	
Park Forest Village	1	Centre County		
Park Gate	1	Lawrence County	16117	
Park Heights	1	York County	17331	
Park Hills	1	Centre County	16801	
Park Hills	1	York County	17331	
Park Junction	1	Philadelphia County		
Park Manor	1	Berks County	19607	
Park Manor	1	Delaware County		
Park Meadows	1	Westmoreland County	15642	
Park Place	1	Delaware County		
Park Place	1	Schuylkill County	17948	
Park View	1	Allegheny County	15238	
Park View Heights	1	Centre County	16823	
Parkchester	1	Chester County	19380	
Parker	1	Armstrong County	16049	
Parker City	1	Armstrong County	16049	
Parker Ford	1	Chester County	19457	
Parker Township	1	Butler County		
Parkers Glen	1	Pike County		
Parkers Landing	1	Armstrong County		
Parkers Landing	1	Clarion County		
Parkersville	1	Chester County	19380	
Parkesburg	1	Chester County	19365	
Parkhill	1	Cambria County	15945	
Parkhill-Goods Corner	1	Cambria County		
Parkland	1	Bucks County	19047	
Parkland Heights	1	Bucks County		
Parks	1	York County		
Parks Crossroad	1	Susquehanna County		
Parks Township	1	Armstrong County		
Parkside	1	Delaware County	19013	
Parkside	1	Monroe County		
Parkstown	1	Cambria County		
Parkstown	1	Lawrence County		
Parkvale	1	Susquehanna County		
Parkview Gardens	1	Lehigh County	18052	
Parkville	1	York County	17331	
Parkway Center	1	Allegheny County	15220	
Parkwood	1	Indiana County	15774	
Parnassus	1	Westmoreland County	15068	
Parrish	1	Forest County		
Parrs Mill	1	Columbia County	17820	
Parryville	1	Carbon County	18244	
Parsons	1	Luzerne County		
Parsonville	1	Butler County	16050	
Parsonville	1	Clearfield County	16651	
Parvin	1	Clinton County	17751	
Paschall	1	Philadelphia County	19142	
Passer	1	Bucks County		
Passmore	1	Berks County	19505	
Patagonia	1	Mercer County		
Patchel Run	1	Venango County	16323	
Patchinville	1	Clearfield County	15724	
Patience	1	Bedford County		
Patricksburg	1	Northumberland County		
Patterson Grove	1	Luzerne County	18655	
Patterson Heights	1	Beaver County	15010	
Patterson Hill	1	Allegheny County	15037	
Patterson Township	1	Beaver County		
Pattersons Mill	1	Washington County	15312	
Pattersonville	1	Schuylkill County	17967	
Patton	1	Cambria County	16668	
Patton	1	Washington County		
Patton Township	1	Allegheny County		
Patton Township	1	Centre County		
Pattonville	1	Armstrong County	16226	
Paulton	1	Westmoreland County	15613	
Paupack	1	Pike County	18451	
Paupack Township	1	Wayne County		
Pavia	1	Bedford County	16655	
Pavia Township	1	Bedford County		
Paxinos	1	Northumberland County	17860	
Paxinosa	1	Northampton County		
Paxtang	1	Dauphin County	17111	
Paxton	1	Dauphin County	17017	
Paxtonia	1	Dauphin County	17112	
Paxtonville	1	Snyder County	17861	
Peacedale	1	Chester County	19363	
Peaceful Valley	1	Butler County		
Peach Bottom	1	Lancaster County	17563	
Peach Bottom Township	1	York County		
Peach Bottom Village	1	Lancaster County	17563	
Peach Glen	1	Adams County	17375	
Peale	1	Clearfield County		
Pealertown	1	Columbia County	17859	
Peanut	1	Lawrence County	16116	
Peanut	1	Westmoreland County	15627	
Pearl	1	Venango County	16342	
Pebble Acres	1	Bucks County	18901	
Pebble Hill	1	Bucks County	18901	
Pecan	1	Venango County	16342	
Pechin	1	Fayette County	15431	
Pecks Pond	1	Pike County	18328	
Peckville	1	Lackawanna County	18452	
Peely	1	Luzerne County		
Pemberton	1	Huntingdon County	16686	
Pembroke	1	Delaware County		
Pen Argyl	1	Northampton County	18072	
Penarth	1	Montgomery County	19004	
Penbrook	1	Dauphin County	17103	
Penbryn	1	Tioga County		
Pencoyd	1	Montgomery County	19004	
Pendle Hill	1	Delaware County	19086	
Penfield	1	Clearfield County	15849	
Penfield	1	Delaware County	19083	
Penfield Downs	1	Montgomery County	19151	
Penllyn	1	Montgomery County	19422	
Pen Mar	1	Franklin County	17268	
Penn	1	Westmoreland County	15675	
Penn Allen	1	Northampton County	18064	
Penn Avon	1	Snyder County		
Penn Center	1	Philadelphia County	19102	
Penn Five	1	Centre County	16666	
Penn Forest Township	1	Carbon County		
Penn Glyn	1	Westmoreland County	15642	
Penn Haven Junction	1	Carbon County		
Penn Heights	1	York County	17331	
Penn Hill	1	Lancaster County	17563	
Penn Hills	1	Allegheny County	15147	15235
Penn Lake Park	1	Luzerne County	18661	
Penn Pines	1	Delaware County	19018	
Penn Pitt	1	Greene County	15338	
Penn Ridge	1	Allegheny County	15235	
Penn Rose	1	Allegheny County	15147	
Penn Rose Park	1	Lancaster County	17601	
Penn Run	1	Indiana County	15765	
Penn Square	1	Montgomery County		
Penn Square Village	1	Montgomery County	19401	
Penn State College	1	Montgomery County		
Penn Township	1	Berks County		
Penn Township	1	Butler County		
Penn Township	1	Centre County		
Penn Township	1	Chester County		
Penn Township	1	Clearfield County		
Penn Township	1	Cumberland County		
Penn Township	1	Huntingdon County		
Penn Township	1	Lancaster County		
Penn Township	1	Lycoming County		
Penn Township	1	Perry County		
Penn Township	1	Snyder County		
Penn Township	1	Westmoreland County		
Penn Township	1	York County		
Penn Valley	1	Bucks County		
Penn Valley	1	Montgomery County	19072	
Penn Valley Terrace	1	Bucks County	19047	
Penn View	1	Centre County		
Penn Village	1	Montgomery County	19464	
Penn Wood	1	Bedford County		
Penn Wynne	1	Montgomery County	19096	
Pennbrook	1	Montgomery County	19446	
Penncraft	1	Fayette County	15433	
Penndel	1	Bucks County	19047	
Pennersville	1	Franklin County	17268	
Pennfield	1	Bucks County	19007	
Pennhall	1	Centre County	16875	
Pennhurst	1	Chester County	19475	
Pennington	1	Huntingdon County		
Pennline	1	Crawford County	16424	
Penns Creek	1	Snyder County	17862	
Penns Park	1	Bucks County	18943	
Penns Woods	1	Westmoreland County	15642	
Pennsburg	1	Montgomery County	18073	
Pennsburg-East Greenville	1	Montgomery County		
Pennsbury Heights	1	Bucks County	19067	
Pennsbury Township	1	Chester County		
Pennsbury Village	1	Allegheny County	15205	
Pennsdale	1	Lycoming County	17761	
Pennside	1	Berks County	19606	
Pennside	1	Erie County	16401	
Pennsville	1	Fayette County	15425	
Pennsville	1	Northampton County	18067	
Pennsylvania Furnace	1	Huntingdon County	16865	
Pennsylvania Military College	1	Delaware County		
Pennvale	1	Lycoming County	17705	
Pennville	1	York County	17331	
Pennwyn	1	Berks County	19607	
Pennypack Woods	1	Philadelphia County		
Penobscot	1	Luzerne County	18707	
Penoke	1	Forest County		
Penowa	1	Washington County	15312	
Penryn	1	Lancaster County	17564	
Pensyls Mill	1	Columbia County		
Pentland	1	York County		
Pequea	1	Lancaster County	17565	
Pequea Township	1	Lancaster County		
Percy	1	Fayette County	15456	
Perdix	1	Perry County	17020	
Perkasie	1	Bucks County	18944	
Perkiomen Heights	1	Montgomery County	18073	
Perkiomen Junction	1	Chester County	19460	
Perkiomen Township	1	Montgomery County		
Perkiomen Village	1	Montgomery County	19426	
Perkiomenville	1	Montgomery County	18074	
Perrine Corners	1	Mercer County	16153	
Perry Township	1	Armstrong County		
Perry Township	1	Berks County		
Perry Township	1	Clarion County		
Perry Township	1	Fayette County		
Perry Township	1	Greene County		
Perry Township	1	Jefferson County		
Perry Township	1	Lawrence County		
Perry Township	1	Mercer County		
Perry Township	1	Snyder County		
Perrymont	1	Allegheny County	15237	
Perryopolis	1	Fayette County	15473	
Perry Square	1	Erie County	16507	
Perrys Corners	1	Mercer County		
Perrysville	1	Allegheny County	15237	
Perrysville	1	Westmoreland County	15618	
Perryville	1	Clarion County	16049	
Perryville	1	Lycoming County	17728	
Perryville	1	Potter County		
Perryville	1	Westmoreland County	15618	
Peru	1	Centre County		
Peru Mills	1	Juniata County		
Perulack	1	Juniata County	17021	
Peters Corner	1	Bucks County	18934	
Peters Creek	1	Allegheny County	15025	
Peters Store	1	Lehigh County	18080	
Peters Township	1	Franklin County		
Peters Township	1	Washington County		
Petersburg	1	Huntingdon County	16669	
Petersburg	1	Mercer County	16130	
Petersburg	1	York County		
Petersville	1	Butler County		
Petersville	1	Northampton County	18067	
Petroleum Center	1	Venango County		
Petrolia	1	Butler County	16050	
Pettis	1	Crawford County	16335	
Pew	1	Clarion County	16240	
Pheasant Hill	1	Lancaster County	17601	
Philadelphia	1	Philadelphia County	19101	99
Philadelphia International Airport	1	Philadelphia County	19153	
Philadelphia Naval Regional Medical Center	1	Philadelphia County	19145	
Philadelphia Naval Shipyard	1	Philadelphia County	19112	
Philadelphia Naval Support Activity	1	Philadelphia County	19112	
Philipsburg	1	Centre County	16866	
Philipsburg	1	Washington County	15419	
Philipston	1	Clarion County	16248	
Phillips	1	Fayette County	15401	
Phillips	1	Tioga County	16950	
Phillipston	1	Clarion County	16248	
Phillipsville	1	Chester County	19320	
Phillipsville	1	Erie County	16442	
Philmont Country Club	1	Montgomery County		
Philmont Manor	1	Montgomery County	19006	
Philmont Park	1	Montgomery County	19006	
Philson	1	Somerset County		
Phoenix	1	Armstrong County		
Phoenix Park	1	Schuylkill County	17901	
Phoenixville	1	Chester County	19460	
Piatt	1	Sullivan County		
Piatt Township	1	Lycoming County		
Pickering	1	Chester County		
Picture Rocks	1	Lycoming County	17762	
Pierce	1	Allegheny County	15025	
Pierce	1	Armstrong County	16240	
Pierceville	1	York County	17327	
Pigeon	1	Forest County	16239	
Pigs Ear	1	Elk County		
Pike Township	1	Berks County		
Pike Township	1	Bradford County		
Pike Township	1	Clearfield County		
Pike Township	1	Potter County		
Pike Mine	1	Fayette County		
Pikeland	1	Chester County	19425	
Pikes Creek	1	Luzerne County		
Pikes Peak	1	Indiana County		
Piketown	1	Dauphin County	17112	
Pikeville	1	Berks County	19547	
Pilgerts	1	Berks County		
Pilgrim Gardens	1	Delaware County	19026	
Pilgrimham	1	Clarion County	16232	
Pillow	1	Dauphin County	17080	
Pilltown	1	Somerset County		
Pindleton	1	Cambria County		
Pine	1	Clinton County	17748	
Pine	1	Tioga County	16938	
Pine Bank	1	Greene County	15341	15354
Pine City	1	Clarion County		
Pine Creek Township	1	Clinton County		
Pine Creek Township	1	Jefferson County		
Pine Flats	1	Indiana County	15728	
Pine Flats	1	Pike County		
Pine Forge	1	Berks County	19548	
Pine Furnace	1	Armstrong County		
Pine Glen	1	Centre County	16845	
Pine Glen	1	Mifflin County	17054	
Pine Grove	1	Cambria County		
Pine Grove	1	Clearfield County		
Pine Grove	1	Lancaster County		
Pine Grove	1	Perry County	17047	
Pine Grove	1	Schuylkill County	17963	
Pine Grove Township	1	Schuylkill County		
Pine Grove	1	Susquehanna County		
Pine Grove Furnace	1	Cumberland County	17324	
Pine Grove Mills	1	Centre County	16868	
Pine Grove Township	1	Warren County		
Pine Hall	1	Centre County	16801	
Pine Hill	1	Armstrong County	16201	
Pine Hill	1	Schuylkill County	17901	
Pine Hill	1	Somerset County	15530	
Pine Junction	1	Schuylkill County		
Pine Mill	1	Wayne County		
Pine Ridge	1	Delaware County	19063	
Pine Run	1	Bucks County	18901	
Pine Run	1	Lycoming County	17744	
Pine Summit	1	Columbia County	17846	
Pine Swamp	1	Chester County	19520	
Pine Township	1	Allegheny County		
Pine Township	1	Armstrong County		
Pine Township	1	Clearfield County		
Pine Township	1	Columbia County		
Pine Township	1	Crawford County		
Pine Township	1	Indiana County		
Pine Township	1	Lycoming County		
Pine Township	1	Mercer County		
Pine Valley	1	Warren County	16405	
Pine View	1	Luzerne County	18707	
Pine Waters	1	Berks County		
Pinecreek	1	Jefferson County		
Pinecrest	1	Bucks County	19047	
Pinecroft	1	Blair County	16601	
Pinedale	1	Schuylkill County	17961	
Pinegrove Township	1	Venango County		
Pinehurst	1	Beaver County		
Pineton	1	Indiana County		
Pinetown	1	York County	17339	
Pinetree	1	Westmoreland County	15683	
Pineview Drive	1	Allegheny County		
Pineville	1	Bucks County	18946	
Pineville	1	Warren County	16420	
Pinewood	1	Bucks County		
Piney Fork	1	Allegheny County	15129	
Piney Township	1	Clarion County		
Pink	1	Wayne County	18436	
Pink Ash Junction	1	Luzerne County		
Pinkerton	1	Somerset County		
Pinney Corners	1	Crawford County		
Pinola	1	Franklin County	17257	
Piolett	1	Clarion County		
Pioneer	1	Venango County		
Piper	1	Clearfield County	16845	
Pipersville	1	Bucks County	18947	
Pitcairn	1	Allegheny County	15140	
Pitco	1	Washington County		
Pithole City	1	Venango County		
Pitman	1	Schuylkill County	17964	
Pitt Gas	1	Greene County	15322	
Pittock	1	Allegheny County	15136	
Pitts	1	Tioga County		
Pittsburgh	1	Allegheny County	15201	99
Pittsburgh Plate Plan	1	Armstrong County	16226	
Pittsburgh Valley	1	Lancaster County	17516	
Pittsburgh West End	1	Allegheny County		
Pittsfield	1	Warren County	16340	
Pittsfield Township	1	Warren County		
Pittston	1	Luzerne County	18640	44
Pittston Junction	1	Luzerne County		
Pittston Township	1	Luzerne County		
Pittsville	1	Venango County	16374	
