= Peanut (disambiguation) =

Peanut or groundnut (Arachis hypogaea) is a species in the pea family Fabaceae, native to South America.

Peanut or Peanuts may also refer to:

== Places ==
- Peanut, California, an unincorporated community
- Peanut, Pennsylvania, an unincorporated community
- Peanut, Arkansas, an unincorporated community
- Peanut Island, Florida
- The Peanut, a neighbourhood in Toronto, Ontario, Canada

== Arts and entertainment ==
=== Games ===
- Peanuts or Nertz, a form of double solitaire
- Peanuts, another name for Mercy (game), a hand war game

=== Music ===
- The Peanuts, a singing duo
- "Peanuts", a 1957 song by Little Joe and the Thrillers
- "Peanuts", a song from The Police's 1978 album Outlandos d'Amour

=== Film ===
- Peanuts (1996 film), a Japanese film by Takashi Miike
- Peanuts (2006 film), a Japanese film

=== Peanuts franchise ===
- Peanuts, a comic strip
  - Peanuts (TV series), a television series based on the comic strip
  - The Peanuts Movie, a 2015 film based on the comic strip

=== Fictional characters ===
- Peanut, a puppet of ventriloquist Jeff Dunham
- Peanut, a television character in Harvey Birdman
- Peanut Otter, one of the main characters of the show PB&J Otter
- Peanut, a recurring character in SuperKitties
- Peanut Big Top, a Lalaloopsy doll and character in the TV series
- Peanut, character on Animal Crossing
- Peanut, a nickname for the character SCP-173

=== Other uses in arts and entertainment ===
- Peanut (gamer), stage name of League of Legends player Han Wang-ho
- Peanut the Elephant, a Beanie Baby collectible toy

== Other uses ==
- Peanut (nickname), a list of people nicknamed either "Peanut" or "Peanuts"
- Foam peanuts, a packing material
- Mr. Peanut, mascot of the snack-food company Planters
- Peanut (squirrel), a pet squirrel who became well-known on social media
- Peanuts (horse), an American Thoroughbred racehorse
- Peanut, name for IBM PCjr, a computer manufactured by IBM starting in 1984
- Peanut, a type of small pocketknife with two blades
- The smallest legally harvestable hard clams

== See also ==
- P-Nut, the bassist for 311
