= Pittsville =

Pittsville may refer to a location in the United States:

- Pittsville, Maryland
- Pittsville, Missouri
- Pittsville, Pennsylvania
- Pittsville, Texas
- Pittsville, Virginia
- Pittsville, Wisconsin

== See also ==
- Pittsville School District, Wisconsin
