= Economy of Vancouver =

Vancouver's economy is one of the most vibrant in Canada. The British Columbian city is Canada's official gateway to the Pacific Rim, a major port, and the main western terminus of transcontinental highway and rail routes. Vancouver has successfully transitioned from a predominantly resource-based economy to a diverse knowledge-based one, and in recent years has been the fastest growing economy in Canada. According to the Conference Board of Canada, in 2017 Vancouver's GDP was CA$137 billion, with a GDP growth rate of 4.5%, meaning that Vancouver represents approximately 7.5% of Canada's overall economy. Major economic sectors include trade, film and TV, technology, tourism, natural resources, and construction.

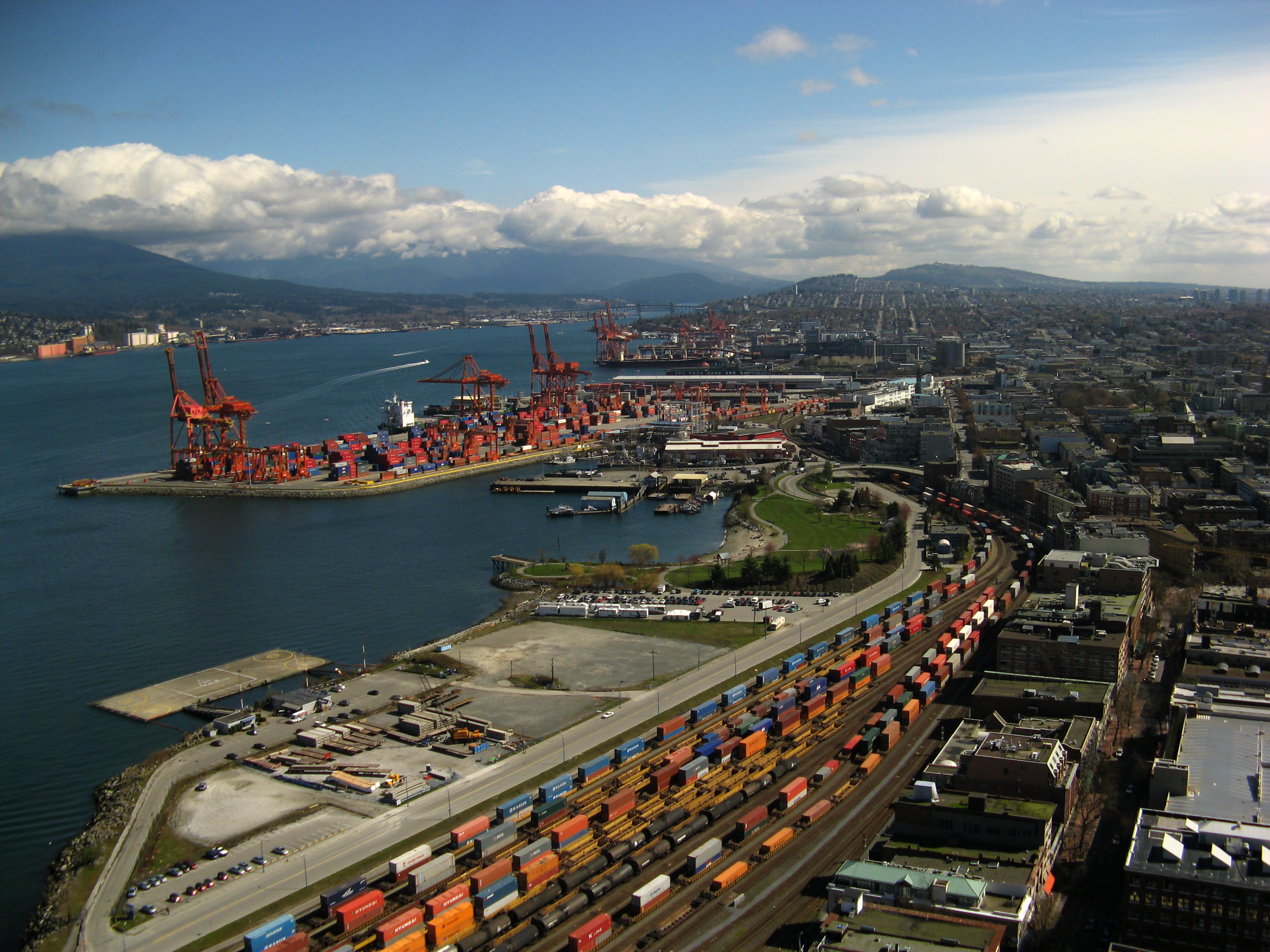
The Port of Vancouver is the largest port in Canada and the third largest port in the Americas (by tonnage).

== International trade ==
International commerce and trade is a key sector for Vancouver's economy. The city has Canada's largest port and is one of North America's major gateways for pan-Pacific trade. The Port of Vancouver ranks first in North America in total foreign exports and second on the west coast in total cargo volume. The Port of Vancouver is Canada's largest and most diversified port, landing and transferring more than 142 million tons of cargo, valued at $200 billion. The Port of Vancouver supports 115,300 jobs in Canada and provides $1.4 billion a year in tax revenues.

Vancouver's central area has 60% of the region's office space and is home to headquarters of forest products and mining companies as well as branches of national and international banks, accounting and law firms. In recent years, Vancouver has expanded as a centre for software development and biotechnology, while film studios and the streets provide a backdrop for the developing film industry. Two of the Port of Vancouver's container docks are located in the city. The Fraser River has barge and log traffic serving forestry and other water related industries. Around 1,800 acres (7.3 km^{2}) of industrial land provide an important range of support services, manufacturing and wholesale premises for businesses throughout the city and region.

== Film and television ==
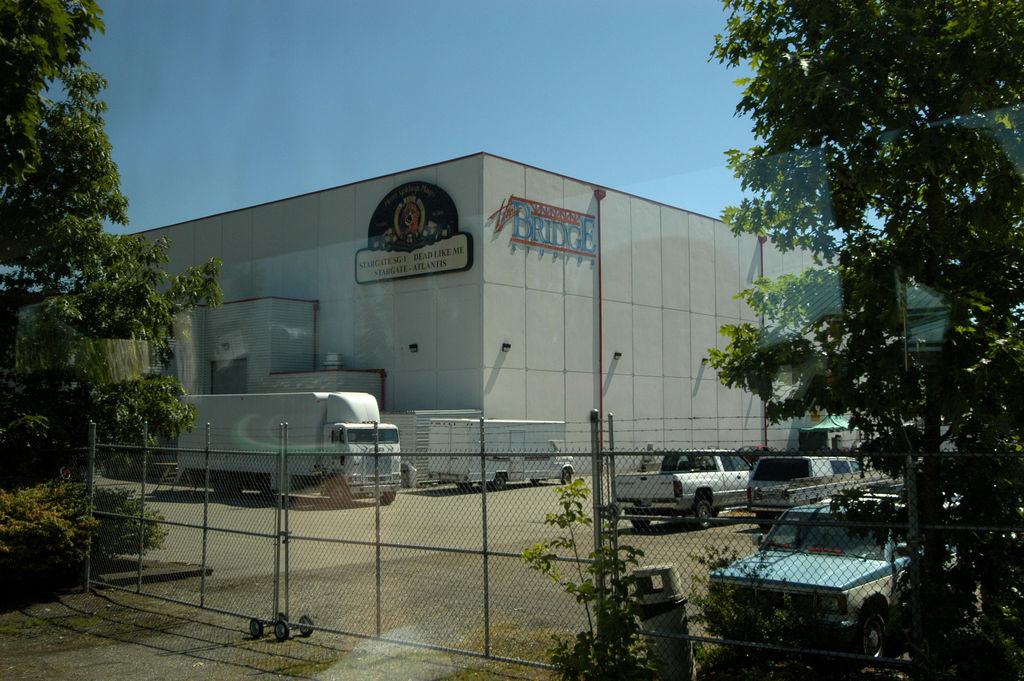
The Bridge Studios is a film studio in Metro Vancouver.

The sobriquet "Hollywood North" has been applied to Vancouver: it hosts approximately 65 movies and 55 TV series annually and is the third largest film and TV production centre in North America. The film industry supports 20,000 jobs in Vancouver. Many U.S. television and films series are shot exclusively in Vancouver. This is due to multiple factors, including being close to and in the same time zone as Los Angeles, tax credits provided by the BC government, and a record of handling major Hollywood productions well. Additionally, in the city and its environments there are numerous "looks" that can make Vancouver seem like many different locations around the world.

== Technology ==
Because of its local universities and reputation for having a very high standard of living, Vancouver has a growing high-technology sector – including software development such as Maximizer Software and e-commerce such as Cymax Stores. Foreign technology companies which have organically grown an operational presence in Vancouver include Netgear, Samsung, IBM, Microsoft, Sage, and Amazon. Arista Networks moved its Vancouver office into the former location of Nokia's Vancouver Research and Development Centre shortly after Nokia shut down its operations in Vancouver.

Foreign technology companies which have an established operational presence in Vancouver via acquiring a Vancouver-based company include: Best Buy (via acquisition of Future Shop), Intel (via acquisition of Recon Instruments), Boeing (via acquisition of AeroInfo Systems), Mastercard (via acquisition of NuData Security), NetApp (via acquisition of Bycast), Broadcom (via acquisition of HotHaus Technologies) CDC Software (via acquisition of Pivotal Corporation), McKesson Corporation (via acquisition of locally based startup ALI Technologies Corp), SAP (via acquisition of Business Objects, which itself had previously acquired Crystal Decisions), Kodak (via acquisition of Creo), and Ericsson (via acquisition of Redback Networks, which itself had previously acquired a locally based startup, Abatis Systems).

The city has also developed a particularly large cluster of video game developers, the largest of which, Electronic Arts, employs over two thousand people. Greater Vancouver is also home to MDA, a pioneering space and defense company behind technologies such as the Canadarm and RADARSAT-2. Additionally, Vancouver is emerging as a world leader in fuel cell technology, accounting for 70 percent of Canadians employed in the industry. The National Research Council Institute for Fuel Cell Innovation is located in Vancouver, and the headquarters of Ballard Power Systems is in neighboring Burnaby.

== Tourism ==
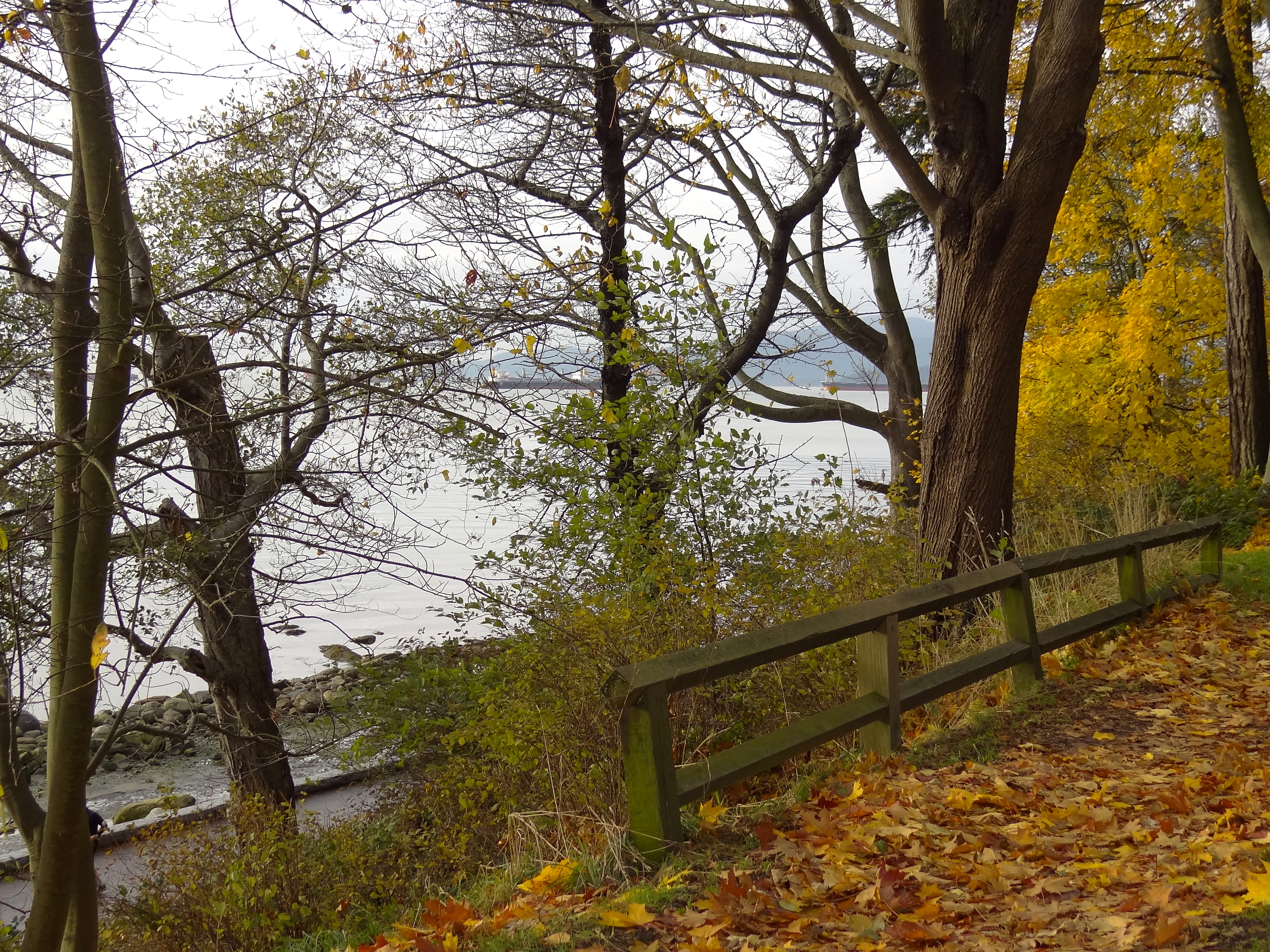
Stanley Park is a major tourist attraction within Vancouver.

The tourism industry is vital to Vancouver. Tourism Vancouver is currently the official destination marketing organization and as such is the official resource for visitors to Greater Vancouver. Vancouver is a major tourist destination, as over 10.3 million people visited Vancouver in 2017. Annually, tourism contributes approximately $4.8 billion to the Metro Vancouver economy and supports over 70,000 jobs. In addition to the city's scenic location, visitors frequent the many gardens and Stanley Park, one of more than 180 city parks, and a combination of natural forest and parklands near the city centre.

The Whistler-Blackcomb Resort, 126 kilometres north of Vancouver, is among the most popular skiing resorts in North America, and was the site of the downhill events of the 2010 Winter Olympics. Grouse Mountain, Mount Seymour, and Cypress Mountain, each with a variety of summer and winter leisure activities, are within a 30 km drive of downtown and all have bird's-eye views of the city and the surrounding region. Vancouver's numerous beaches, parks, waterfronts, and mountain backdrops, combined with its cultural and multi-ethnic character, all contribute to its unique appeal and style. Over a million people annually pass through Vancouver en route to a cruise ship vacation, usually to Alaska. Also of note, the 1986 World Exposition was held in Vancouver.

== Banking and finance ==
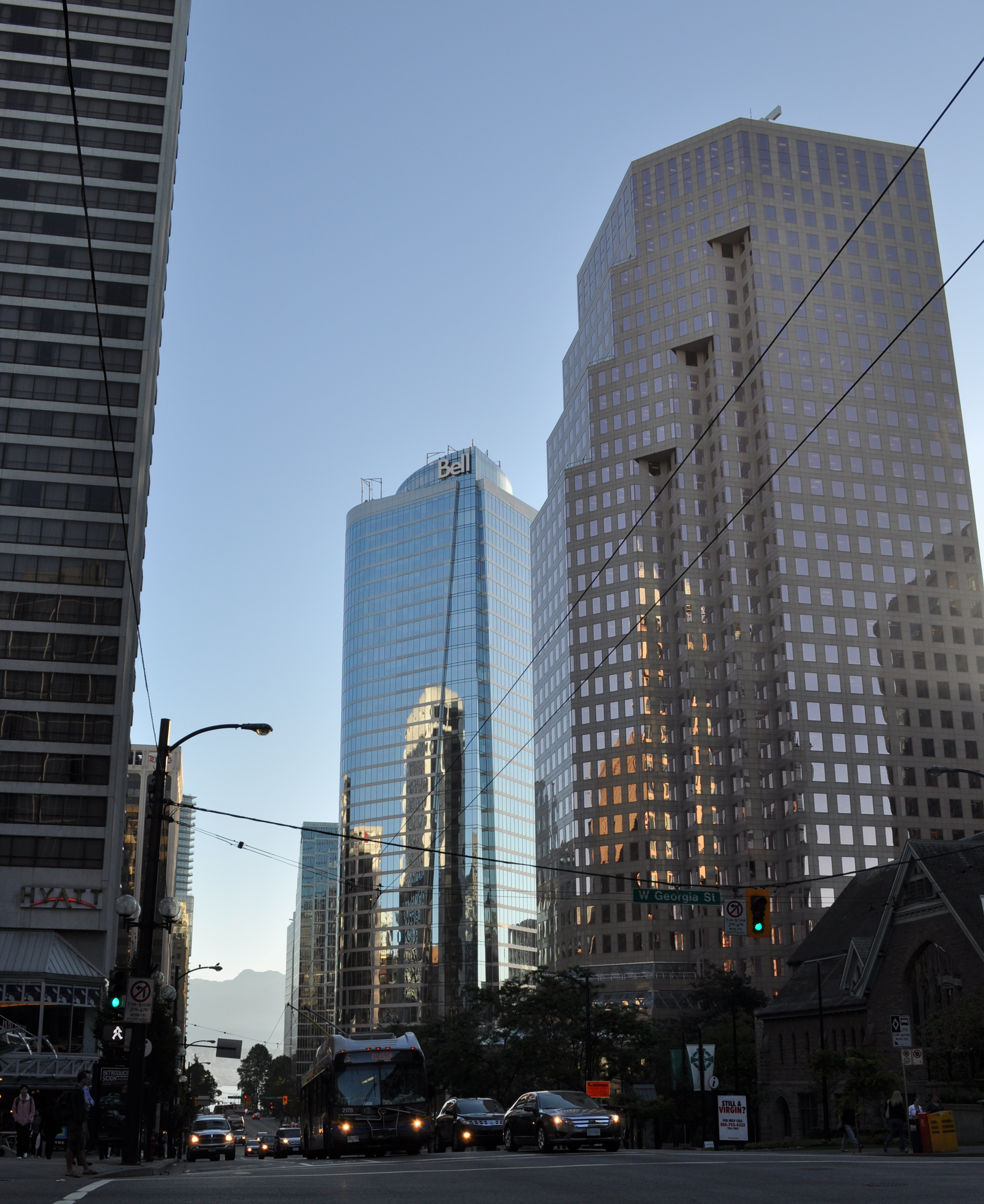
The intersection of West Georgia and Burrard Street serves as the focal point for Vancouver's Financial District.

The headquarters for Canaccord Genuity and Vancity are located in the financial district in downtown. The Big Five Canadian banks also have modest regional operations located in Vancouver, although they occupy only a portion of the space in the downtown buildings they lease the right to have their logos on. In the 2018 Global Financial Centres Index, Vancouver was ranked as having the 18th most competitive financial center in the world and second most competitive in Canada after Toronto.

== Aviation ==
Located in Richmond, Vancouver International Airport (YVR) is the principal international airport in western Canada and is the second busiest in the nation. As the premier gateway to Asia, it hosts many airlines' regional offices and their flights daily to Asia, Europe, and the United States. Vancouver has the closest North American air-link to Pacific Rim cities, with daily non-stop flights to Tokyo, Osaka, Seoul, Busan, Beijing, Shanghai, Hong Kong, Taipei, Manila and Sydney. Vancouver is also served by the Abbotsford International Airport, fast becoming a reliever to YVR convenient for the eastern suburbs and transborder United States. Operating from Vancouver Harbour Water Aerodrome on the Downtown waterfront, several floatplane operators support both tourist scenic flights and practical transportation, with extensive operations during daylight hours.

== Housing ==
In its 2016 second quarter report, the Canada Mortgage and Housing Corporation said there were high levels of home sales but small increases in supply in Vancouver, which was then Canada's most expensive city to purchase a home. The average detached home cost was $1.56 million in Metro Vancouver that June, and town homes and apartments ratio of sales to new listings had shifted into overheated conditions, with price acceleration a factor. CMHC singled out Vancouver for "high" evidence of problematic conditions in its housing market.

Problematic conditions are defined as imbalances in the housing market. CMHC says those imbalances can occur when overbuilding, overvaluation, overheating and price acceleration, or combinations of those factors, move away from historical averages.

In 2021, the Statistics Canada census reported that, in Vancouver, 166,490 households were renters, which represented about 55% of all private households in Vancouver.

The City of Vancouver regulates housing conditions to the extent its bylaws allow, while the provincial government regulates landlord and tenants disputes. In certain cases, the two government bodies will impact each other to improve repair and maintenance bylaws and to ensure dwellings are safe for renters. In 2025, the Cardero case illustrated the impact a provincial legal decision can have on altering municipal bylaws to better protect Vancouver residents against unsanitary living conditions and indoor air pollution.

== International relations ==
Downtown also plays host as a major centre for diplomacy and foreign relations. 54 countries have a consulate or consulate general offices in the city. In addition, major diplomatic meetings have been hosted by the city, including the Yeltsin–Clinton summit in 1993 and the APEC annual meeting in 1997. The city hosted the United Nations' World Urban Forum III in 2006. Finally, Greenpeace was founded in Vancouver and had its world headquarters there in the past. As a result of the powerful influence of green politics, Vancouver was among the first North American cities to declare itself a Nuclear Weapons Free Zone and a Fair Trade city.
