= Paupack =

Paupack may refer to:

- Paupack, Pennsylvania, an unincorporated community in Pike County
- Paupack Township, Pennsylvania
