= Oley Valley =

Coordinates: 40.383°N 75.776°W

Oley Valley, Pennsylvania
- Region
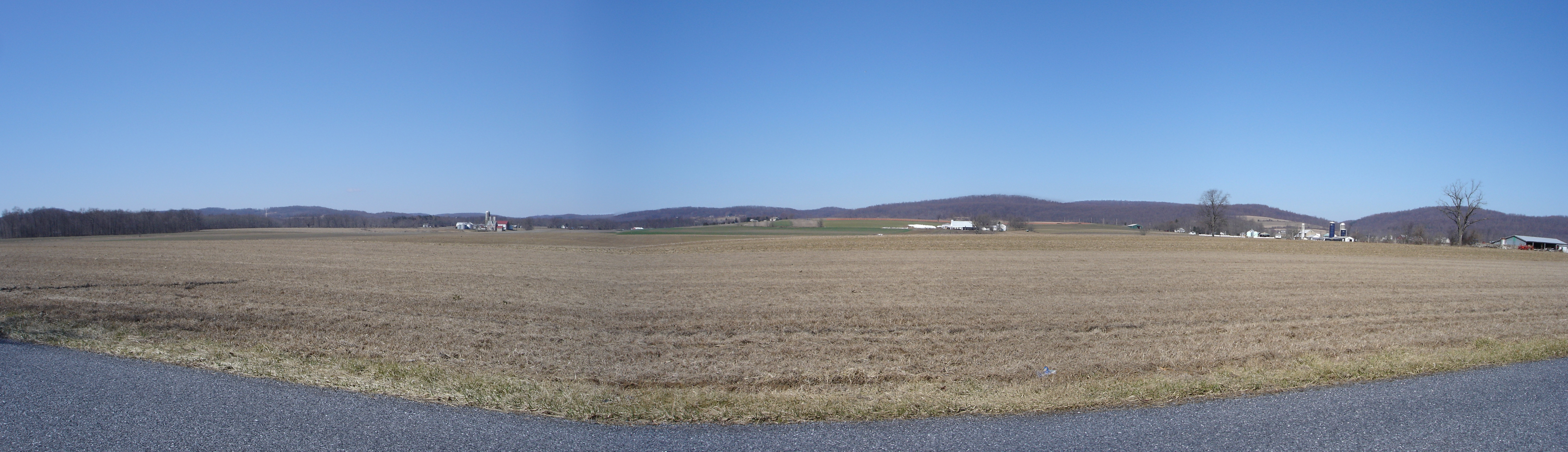
- Oley Valley, Pennsylvania in March 2008
- Interactive map of Oley Valley, Pennsylvania
- Country: United States
- State: Pennsylvania
- County: Berks
- Time zone: UTC-5 (Eastern (EST))
  - Summer (DST): UTC-4 (EDT)
- Area codes: 610 and 484

The Oley Valley is a valley 10 miles (16 km) northeast of Reading, Pennsylvania. It covers all of Oley, Pike, Ruscombmanor, Alsace, and part of Exeter Township. The valley is drained by Manatawny and Pine Creeks, and is a part of the Schuylkill River system.

At the center of the valley is the village of Oley. The village has a strong historical heritage. In March 1983, the entire Township of Oley was listed on the National Register of Historic Places.

== History ==
Before European settlers arrived the valley was home to a tribe of Lenape Native Americans, who gave Oley its name. In the Lenape's Unami language, "Olink" means Bowl, which is roughly the shape of the valley, which was an important meeting place for Native Americans. The Sacred Oak, which is located about one mile (1.6 km) from Main Street is an oak tree that is over 500-years-old, where the Lenape made treaties and settled differences.

The first European settlers arrived in the Oley Valley in the early 1700s. The settlers were primarily German along with French Huguenots and Swiss seeking religious freedom. One of the Valley's early residents was Mordecai Lincoln, the great-grandfather of Abraham Lincoln, the 16th President of United States. The Lincoln Homestead can still be seen and visited in what is now Exeter Township. The Moravian Church had a congregation for a time in Oley and operated one of the first schools in the area. The first settler, named John Palmer Fleck of Wyomissing, Pennsylvania, moved to the Maxatawny region of the Oley Valley.

When they arrived, they found prosperous Lenape villages and fields of corn. The settlers and the Native Americans existed peacefully for many years with some of the Indians converting to Christianity. However, when the French and Indian War began relations between the settlers and the Lenape became strained. One day it was reported that a nearby farmer had been killed by Indians and the entire town gathered in the largest house. That night, sentries were posted and all men with their muskets were positioned at small firing ports cut in the building's wall. The next morning, a man was seen walking down the road, who at first was perceived to be an Indian but turned out to be the farmer who had supposedly been murdered. The farmer had no knowledge of his supposed death and informed the townspeople that in the middle of the night all the Lenape had disappeared from the Oley Valley. It is believed that Native Americans of the Valley left to fight in the war although it is still a mystery since none of them ever returned. The Indians' dwellings were left standing and undisturbed for many years until the last house collapsed in 1856.

Another one of the Valley's early residents was the Boone family. Daniel Boone the famous pioneer was born in Oley in 1734. Oley played an important role during the early days of the Revolutionary War. During George Washington's encampment at Valley Forge, Oley's farmers sent large amounts of food along with cannonballs made at the Oley Furnace to bolster Washington's Continental Army.

One of the most prominent people in the history of early Oley was Mountain Mary Originally named Anna Maria Jung, she was a German immigrant who practiced pow-wow, also known as Braucherei, and she had an extensive understanding of herbal remedies for various ailments. Jung was a resource for those seeking advice and offered remedies and comfort to the sick. She kept one cow and did her own baking and some light farming, common for the era, but made her income primarily by keeping bees and making butter. Her secluded log cabin was located on a ridge above Pikeville, where she lived a reclusive life with her two sisters, no longer stands, but her spring house on a farm along Mountain Mary Road is still standing. The 1790 census, the nation's first, lists Mountain Mary as an "abbess," suggesting that her home was seen as a kind of convent. She became ill, and died in November 1819.

The Annals of Oley Valley were written in 1926 and continue to be a genealogical resource to this day. The town was originally named "Friedensburg" but that was changed after World War II because it was too often confused with a different Friedensburg PA located farther north.

Prior to World War II, Pennsylvania Dutch was still the primary language of the native residents. After the war use of the language decreased and today it is only fluently spoken by the older residents of the valley. Even though the language is almost gone a strong heritage remains among the people of the valley.

Wallace Stevens, the American poet, was raised in Reading, and the Oley Valley influenced some of his poetry. Stevens' poem "Credences of Summer", published in his 1947 collection Transport to Summer, makes reference to Ole Valley:

One of the limits of reality
Presents itself in Oley when the hay,
Baked through long days, is piled in mows. It is
A land too ripe for enigmas, too serene.

== Community ==
Oley is the small village located at the center of the Oley Valley at the intersection of PA Route 73 and PA Route 662.

=== The Oley Fair ===
In 1946, the Oley Valley Community Fair Association was officially established. A year later, in 1947, the first annual Oley Valley Community Fair was held from October 2 to October 4. The first Oley Fair included exhibits of locally produced goods, exhibits from local businesses, entertainment, and food.

The Oley Fair originally began on the Oley School grounds. Classes were dismissed early in order to set up for the fair, in fact, students continue to be dismissed early on the Friday during the week of the fair. Various exhibits were housed inside the school including the Home Economics, Fruit and Vegetable Departments, as well as some commercial displays. A few Oley citizens lent money to the Fair to purchase surplus tents from the Army. These tents were erected on the playing fields behind the school to house the Farm Crops and Livestock.

In 1958, building expansions on the Oley School grounds limited the availability of buildings to the Fair Association. For this reason other locations were considered and the Oley Fire Company grounds, which were adjacent to the school grounds, were selected as an alternate location for the fair. The fair was also able to purchase 2.5 acres (10,000 m^{2}) of land adjacent to the Oley Fire Company grounds which is used for additional parking. All of these projects have helped to better display and promote many of the fair's exhibits and activities.

The Oley Fair still continues strong to this day with the Fair celebrating its 60th anniversary in 2006. The Fair has become a community tradition and some people work hard for the entire year to grow a prize-winning fruit or vegetable. The Fair offers the people of the Valley an opportunity to show their prize-winning livestock, produce, and handiwork. The fair is also famous for its food, which is prepared by volunteers, not commercial vendors, and is cooked in traditional Pennsylvania Dutch style.

=== Reading Motorcycle Club ===
Oley is home to the Reading Motorcycle club which has met annually in Oley for the past 65 years. Officially, the Reading Motorcycle Club is 97 years old. Although research has turned up evidence of an organized motorcycle club in Reading as early as 1905, it wasn't until 1914 that the club was officially incorporated. Oley is home to a rural community which welcomes the motorcycle community.

=== Oley Valley development ===
Beginning in the summer of 2006, two developments were built in Oley. Cricket Slopes includes 12 homes. Middlecreek Farms, the second development, has 35 homes. These are the first large scale developments to be built in the Valley in nearly three decades. In the winter of 2006, construction began on a 130 home 55 and older community built on 30 acres (120,000 m^{2}) of land, next to the elementary and middle school. Many people have complained that these developments harm the rural and historical heritage of Oley and increase the tax burden, and that local government has failed to enact appropriate zoning to protect and preserve farmland. In 2008, construction began on a new building to house the Post Office and the Oley Fire Company Ambulance. The Post Office and Fire Company began using the building in late 2009.

In 2012, an Old Order Mennonite community was established in the Oley Valley, buying two large farms. The Old Order Mennonites in the area belong to the Groffdale Conference Mennonite Church and use the horse and buggy as transportation.

== See also ==
- Oley Township, Pennsylvania
- Oley Valley High School
