= Park Place =

Park Place may refer to:

== Media ==
- Park Place (TV series), a 1981 CBS sitcom

== Places ==
=== Canada ===
- Park Place (Barrie), a shopping centre in the city of Barrie, Ontario
- Park Place (Vancouver), a skyscraper
- Park Place Mall, Lethbridge, Alberta

=== United Arab Emirates ===
- Park Place (Dubai), a 234 m (768 ft) tower in the United Arab Emirates completed in 2007

=== United Kingdom ===
- Park Place, Berkshire, a historic house
- Park Place (Croydon), a proposed shopping centre
- the former name of Castle Park House in Frodsham, Cheshire

=== United States ===
- Park Place (Atlanta), a skyscraper
- Park Place (Tucson, Arizona), an indoor shopping mall
- Park Place, Houston, a neighborhood
- Park Place (Norfolk, Virginia), a neighborhood
- Park Place Entertainment, a casino and hotel operator which changed its name to Caesars Entertainment
- Park Place Hotel and Casino, a hotel and casino located in Atlantic City, later named Bally's Atlantic City
  - Park Place, a street in Atlantic City, New Jersey, featured on Monopoly
- Park Place, Schuylkill County, Pennsylvania, a census-designated place in Schuylkill County
- Park Place (Pittsburgh), a neighborhood in Point Breeze, Pittsburgh, Pennsylvania
- Park Place School in Pittsburgh, Pennsylvania, a building on the National Register of Historic Places

== See also ==
- Park Place station (disambiguation)
