= Sacred Oak =

Chinkapin Oak in Oley Valley, Pennsylvania

Coordinates: 40°22′30.5″N 75°48′40.9″W

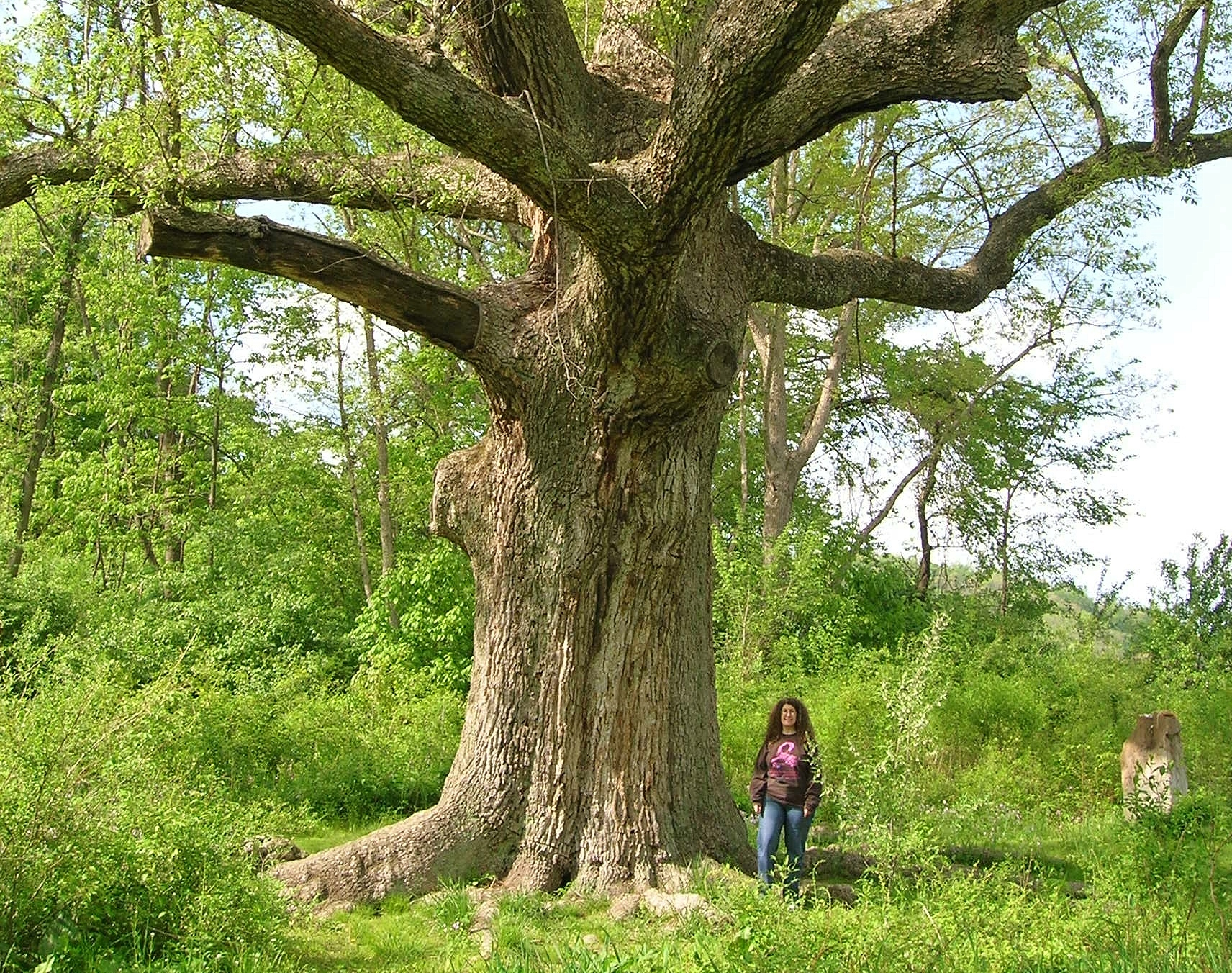
Sacred Oak Tree with visitor for size comparison.

The Sacred Oak is a more-than-500-year-old Chinkapin Oak located in the Oley Valley, Pennsylvania. It sits in a grove of trees just off Friedensburg Road.

== The legend of the Sacred Oak ==
According to Native-American legend, a beautiful woman, the wife of a powerful chief, became very ill. All the tribe's medicine men were called in; they "pow-wowed" and administered herbal medicines, to no effect. Slowly, the chief's wife became weaker and sicker. Finally, desperate for a cure, the young chief traveled to the Sacred Oak and there prayed to the Great Spirit for his wife to be saved. Amazingly, when he returned to camp, his wife was well again. Several years went by and the tribe was threatened by a hostile tribe. Once again, the chief traveled to the Sacred Oak and prayed to the Great Spirit, who gave him guidance. The chief gathered blankets and beads and journeyed to the enemy's camp. His gifts were accepted, and before he left, he smoked the pipe of peace with the chief of the other tribe. From then on, the Sacred Oak was looked upon as the shrine tree of the Delaware Indians. They went to the Sacred Oak in times of trouble to pray, and legend has it that help was always given to them. Legend says that the oak also has caused adverse effects to ones who have wronged or disrespected the oak. According to legend, the son of a high Lenape chief once urinated on the oak. Later that same day the ten-year-old disappeared into the woods of Oley never to be found.

== The Sacred Oak today ==
Today, the Sacred Oak still grows in a forested area just off Friedensburg Road in Oley Township. In the past, people were allowed to visit the tree, but now the land is considered private property and, due to evidence and sightings of pagan worship ceremonies, is typically off limits to visitors. This includes numerous spottings of robed individuals near the tree, ritualistic items on the surrounding rocks, and multiple animal carcasses. The land was recently sold to a new owner, who has begun raising money to help preserve the Sacred Oak. In 2007, the leader of the Lenape Nation Council, Chief Gentlemoon led two ceremonies to revitalize the tree. The tree was fertilized and deadwood was trimmed to help the tree continue to grow. The wood is being used for a variety of things, including being made into pens by a local craftsmen and Native-Americans all over the country. The Sacred Oak is currently the biggest tree in Berks County and is on the Pennsylvania Forestry Association's Champion Trees of Pennsylvania website.

Elders of the Lenni Lenape tribe have certified the tree has been venerated for 480+ years. The current owner, a horticulturist, places the tree's age at approximately 700 years.

== Dimensions of the Sacred Oak ==
- Height: 73 feet
- Girth: 21 feet 2 inches
- Spread: 118 feet
- Age: 500+ years old

== Gallery ==
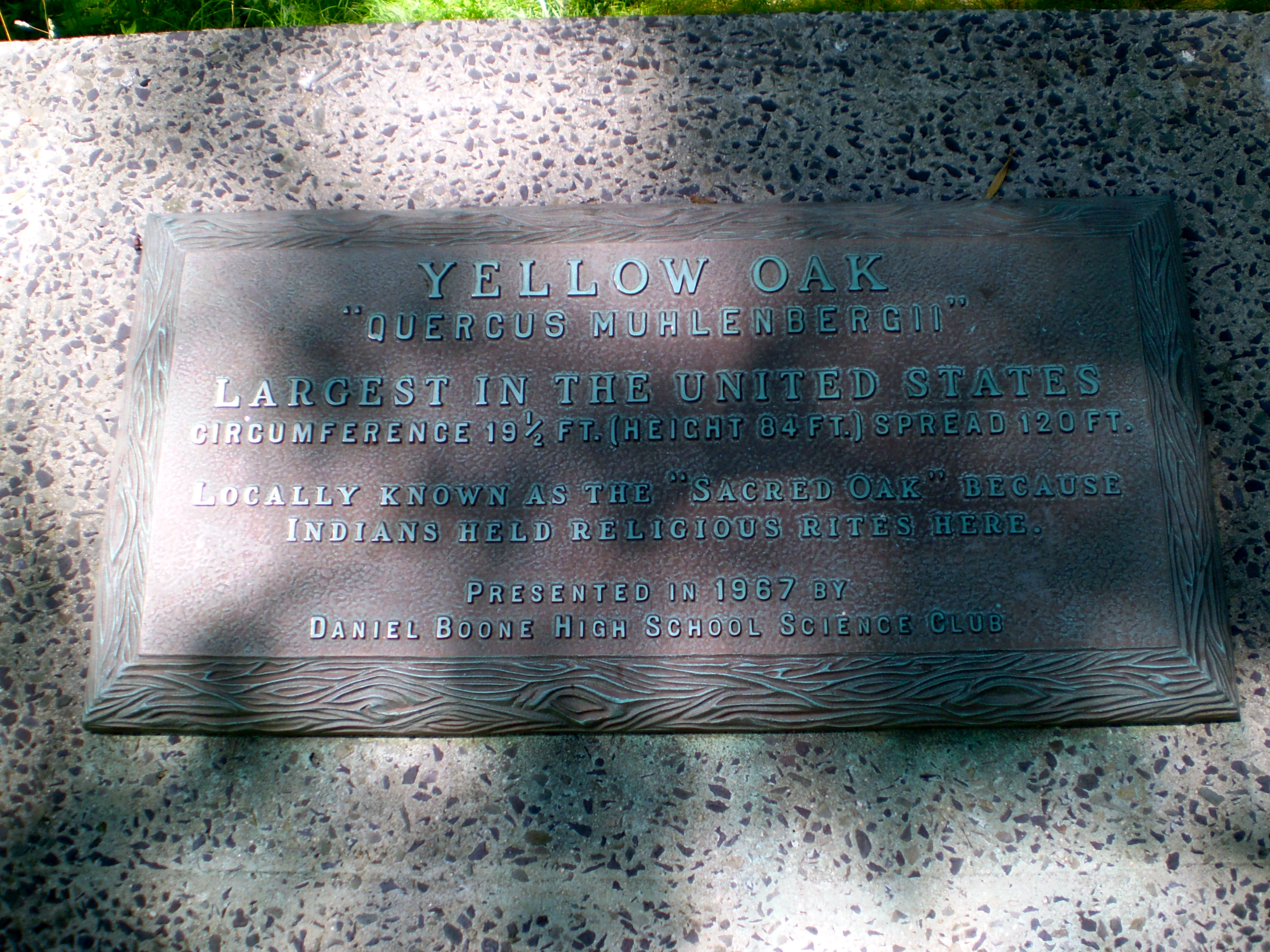

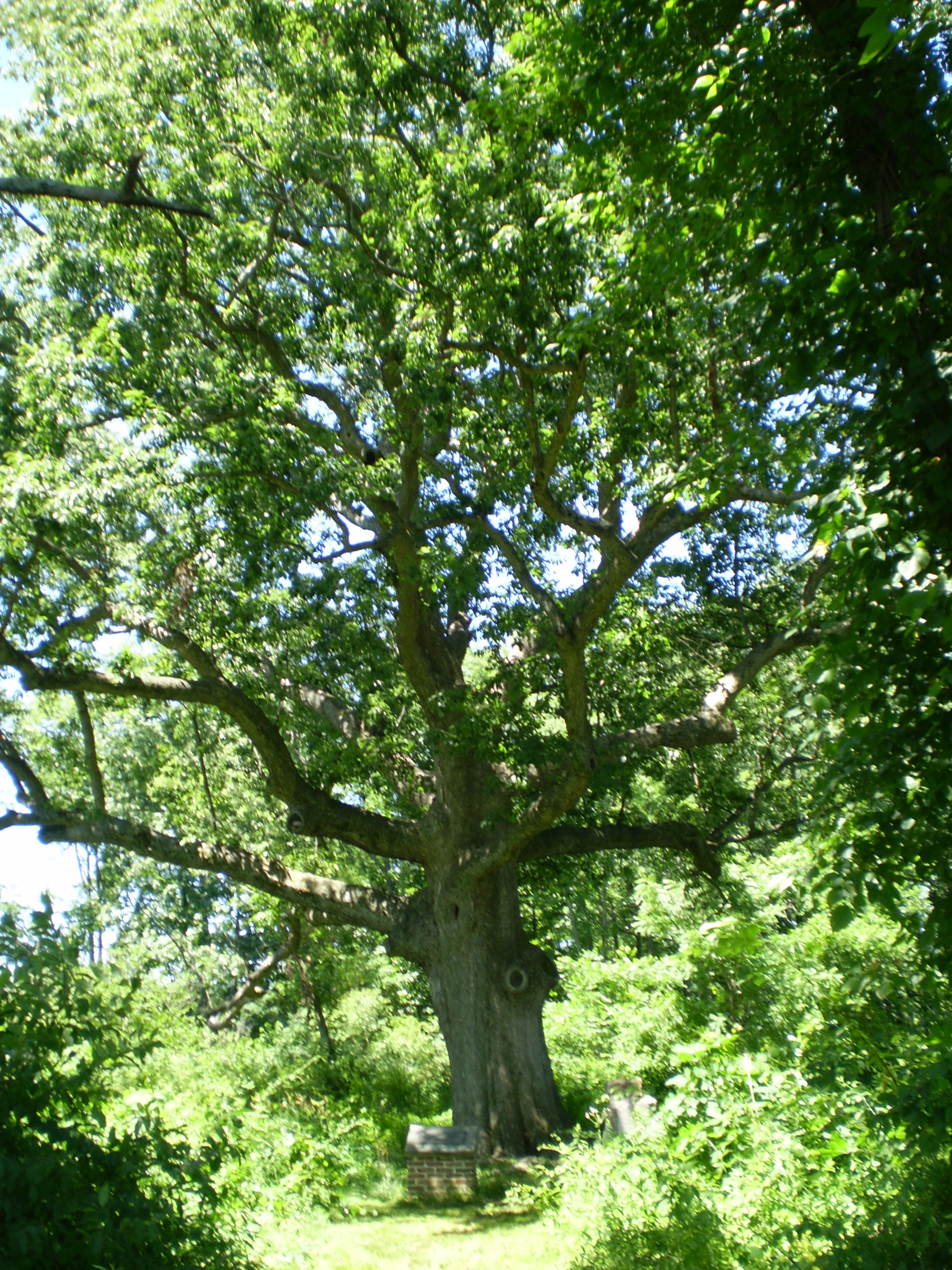

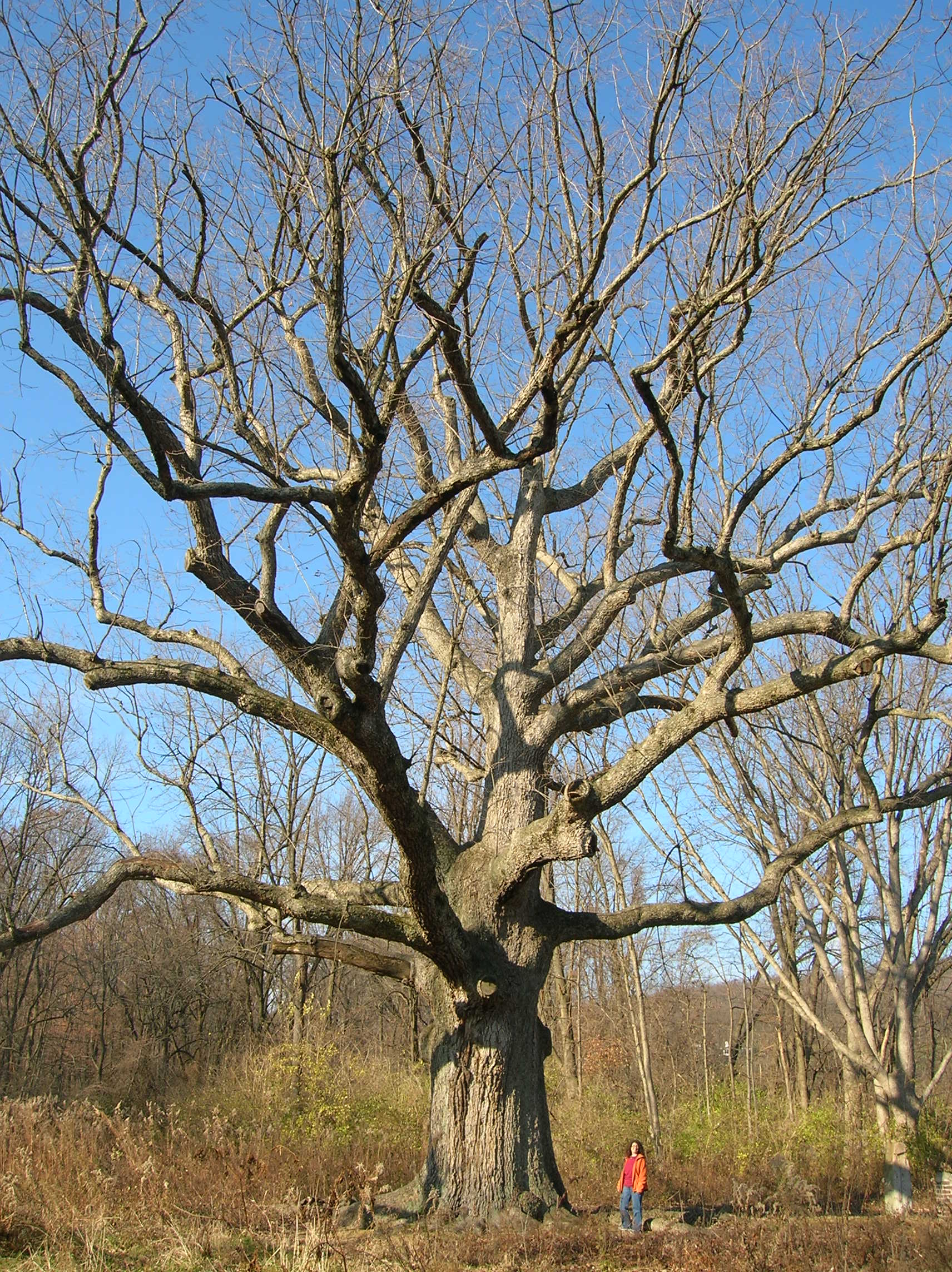
November 2012

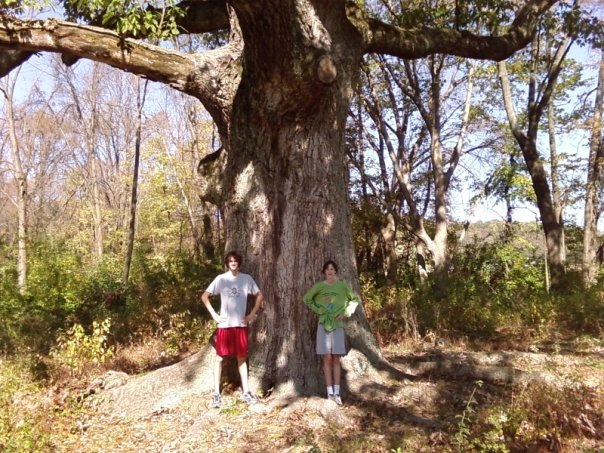
Sacred Oak Tree with visitors for size comparison.

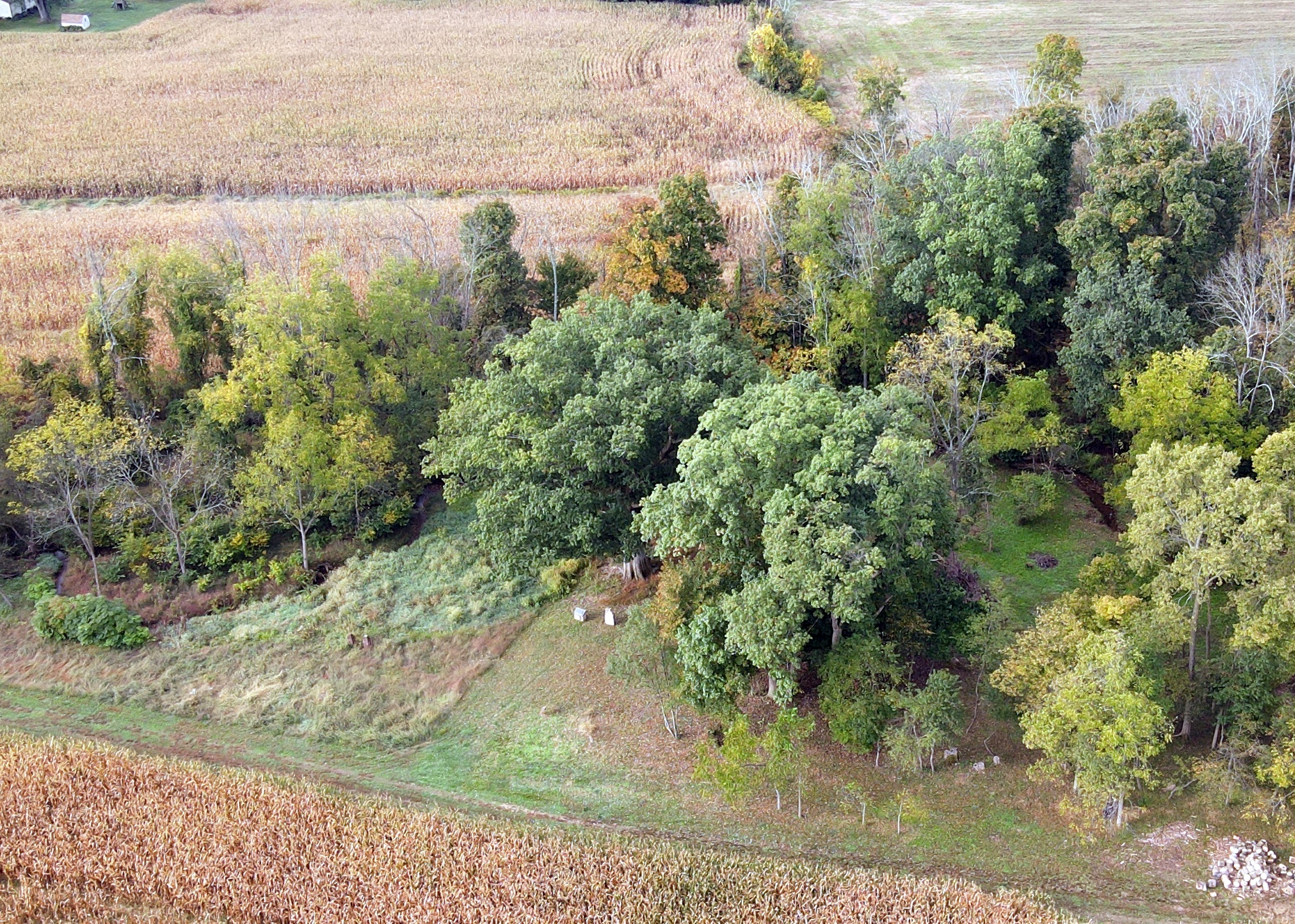
Sacred Oak Tree from the Air.

== See also ==
- List of oldest trees
- List of individual trees
- Oley Valley
- Oley Township
