= QuadReal Property Group =

Canadian real estate company

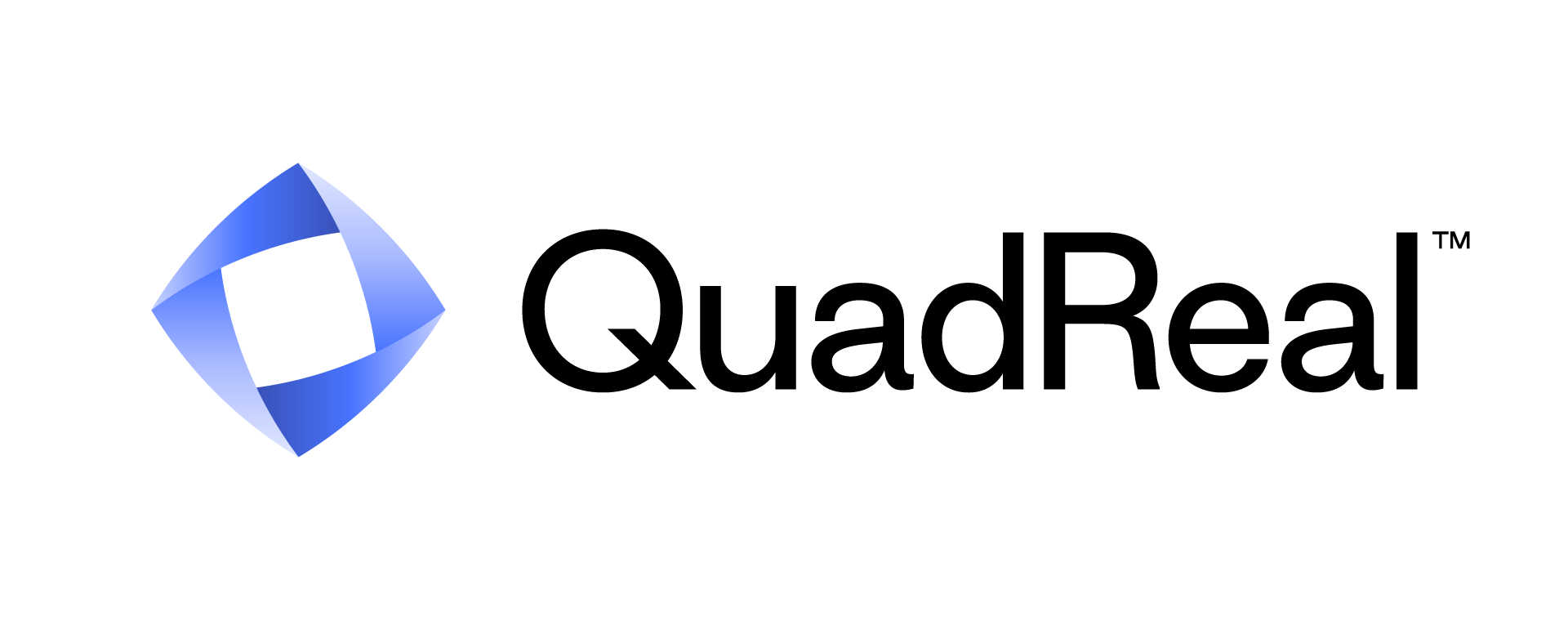

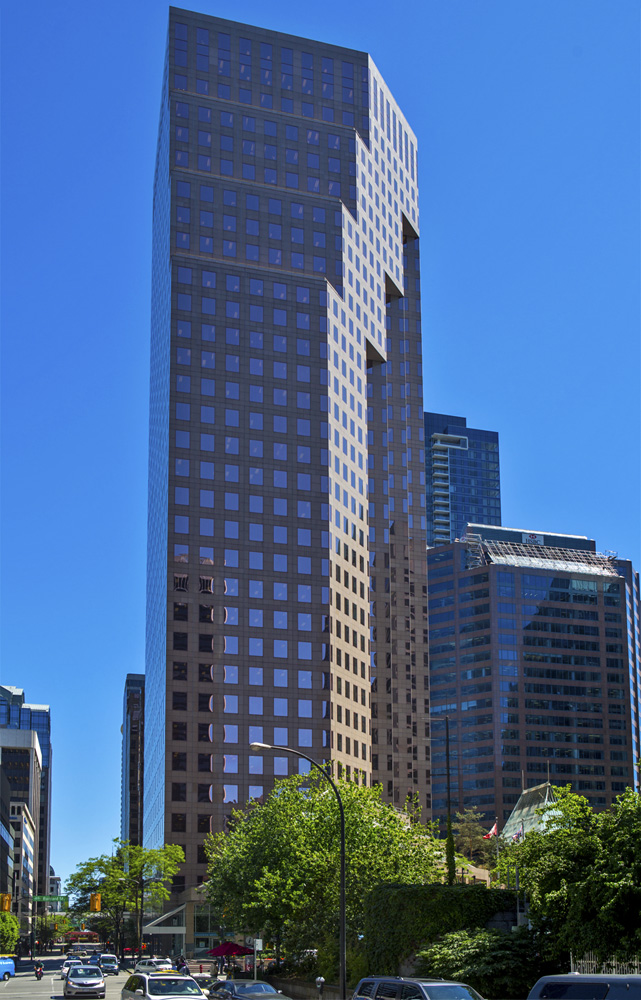
- Headquarters at Park Place
- Type: Private
- Industry: Real estate
- Founded: June 1, 2016; 10 years ago
- Headquarters: Park Place, Vancouver, Canada
- Key people: R. Scott Hutcheson (Chairman); Dennis Lopez (CEO)
- AUM: CA$94 billion (2025)
- Number of employees: 1,900 (2025)
- Parent: British Columbia Investment Management Corporation
- Subsidiaries: Maple Leaf Storage; Parkbridge; Article Student Living
- Website: www.quadreal.com

QuadReal Property Group (QuadReal) is a Canadian company headquartered in Vancouver that invests, operates, and develops real estate. It is wholly owned by British Columbia Investment Management Corporation (BCI) and acts as its real estate investment arm.

Outside Canada and the United States, the firm has offices in London and Hong Kong.

== History ==
QuadReal Property Group was established on June 1, 2016, as a wholly owned real estate subsidiary of British Columbia Investment Management Corporation (BCI), a crown corporation established to provide investment services to British Columbia’s public sector. On that date, BCI announced QuadReal would manage CA$18 billion in real estate assets. This was done to align with its peers who also had their own real estate investment arms: Caisse de dépôt et placement du Québec had Ivanhoé Cambridge, OMERS had Oxford Properties and Ontario Teachers' Pension Plan had Cadillac Fairview. However these were all acquired and then integrated while QuadReal was to be an entirely new entity set up. Prior to QuadReal, BCI's real estate assets were managed by Bentall Kennedy, GWL Realty Advisors and Realstar which were subsequently transferred to QuadReal in February 2017. In addition, staff who managed the assets at Bentall Kennedy were moved to QuadReal.

In May 2017, QuadReal named its first CEO, Dennis Lopez who was previously the global chief investment officer of Axa Investment Managers. Around this time, QuadReal had 87% of investments in Canada and aimed to have more investments internationally to diversify its holdings.

In March 2018, QuadReal announced it would be opening an office in London and would be expanding its operations to Europe. At the time most of its investments were in the Americas but the plan was to reduce it to 50% while 25% would be allocated to Europe and Asia each to be more balanced.

In 2021, it was reported that QuadReal in less than five years since its launch, had become the third-largest real estate owner in Canada, surpassing CPP Investment Board and Cadillac Fairview. It took advantage during the COVID-19 pandemic when it bought listed hotel platforms at steep discounts, stepped in as an equity partner for groups during a difficult fundraising environment and invested in alternative properties such as data centers and life science facilities. As a result, the company had significant growth where by the end of 2020, its holdings had grown 41% year-on year. Originally with CA$18 billion, its assets at this time increased to CA$58.4 billion. This was despite market and property levels dropping to their lowest volume in seven years. In addition its performance surpassed the benchmark on both a one- and five-year basis.

In May 2023, due to rising tensions between Canada and China, BCI paused all further investments in China. QuadReal which in the last few years had significantly invested in China was affected by the change.

== Acquisitions ==
In March 2019, RBC, British Columbia Investment Management Corporation and QuadReal Property Group formed a partnership to give RBC’s newly formed Canadian Core Real Estate Fund access to more than 40 real estate assets valued at over $7 billion, with QuadReal managing the portfolio.

At the end of 2020, QuadReal partnered with AXA SA, Public Sector Pension Investment Board, Temasek Holdings, to complete 22 Bishopsgate in London, which became fully leased by July 2025.

In July 2023, Parkbridge, an operating platform of QuadReal, operated 60 land lease communities across Canada. In November 2024, QuadReal expanded its manufactured housing portfolio outside of Canada with the acquisition of more than 17,000 units in the US.

In May 2025, QuadReal and GPT Group formed a $1 billion joint venture to invest in Australian logistics, their second partnership after a similar deal in 2021. QuadReal holds an 80 percent share. The next month, QuadReal purchased eight student housing properties in the UK from Apollo for £500 million. Also in 2025, QuadReal partnered with Valor Real Estate Partners to refinance a UK logistics portfolio of 14 assets with a £260 million loan from Blackstone Inc. and a five-property urban logistics portfolio in Paris and Lyon with a €105 million loan from Deutsche Pfandbriefbank. In September 2025, the Financial Times reported QuadReal expanded its UK and Ireland real estate debt platform and planned to deploy more than £2.5 billion in lending over the following three to five years. That same month, QuadReal acquired Realstar’s UK and Ireland residential operating platform, expanding its presence in build-to-rent and student living. In January 2026, QuadReal financed UK self-storage and logistics projects in an £86 million deal.
