= Financial District, Vancouver =

Financial District
- Central business district
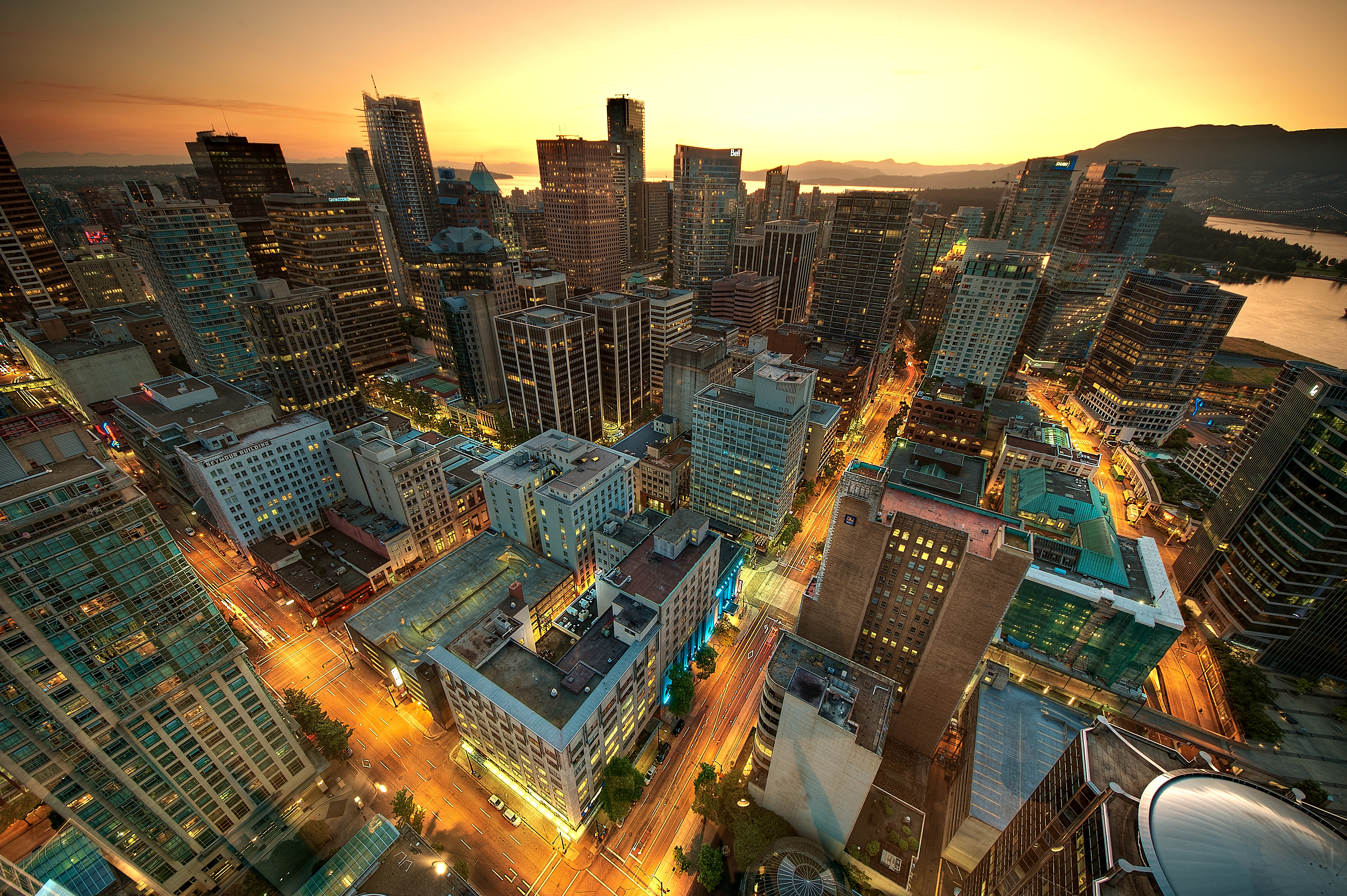

- Location in Vancouver
- Coordinates: 49.281762°N 123.117718°W
- Country: Canada
- Province: British Columbia
- City: Vancouver
- Time zone: UTC-8 (PST)
  - Summer (DST): UTC-7 (PDT)

The Financial District is the central business district of Downtown Vancouver, British Columbia, Canada. It is located on the Downtown Peninsula, bounded roughly by Burrard Street and West Hastings Street.

It is one of the densest areas of Vancouver, containing more than 60% of the city's office space, and is home to many major banks, corporate headquarters, accounting and law firms, and financial services companies. The area also contains various government buildings, embassies and consulates, non-governmental organizations, and luxury hotels.

== History ==
The financial district emerged in the early 1900s following the building boom in the area, in part driven by the Canadian Pacific Railway Company's efforts to attract banks westward from Main and Hastings toward CPR's newly-surveyed Granville Street. From 1907 to 1913, a number of office buildings were built along West Hastings Street, including:

- Sun Tower
- Dominion Trust Building
- Vancouver Stock Exchange

The financial district quickly expanded after the 1970s, with many new buildings being erected in the 1980s and 1990s.

Vancouver's financial district is relatively compact in comparison to those of other major cities. Many of the skyscrapers in the district are regional offices of international or Big Five Canadian banks and various financial services institutions.

== Major skyscrapers and buildings ==
- Paradox Hotel Vancouver (formerly Trump International Hotel and Tower)
- RBC Place
- Harbour Centre
- One Wall Centre
- Guinness Tower
- Burrard Building
- Royal Centre
- Park Place
- MNP Tower
- Canaccord Tower
- Scotia Tower
- Oceanic Plaza
- Living Shangri-La
- Cathedral Place
- Fairmont Hotel Vancouver
- FortisBC Centre
- 745 Thurlow
- Western Forest Products
- 1075 West Georgia Tower
- Four Seasons Hotel Vancouver
- Hyatt Regency Vancouver
- Pacific Centre
- Bentall Centre, Vancouver
- Sinclair Centre
- Sun Tower
- Electra Building
- TD Tower
- Fairmont Pacific Rim
- Commerce Place

== Transit ==
Vancouver's Financial District is well served by numerous local and commuter bus routes running along Burrard and Georgia streets. In the heart of the Financial District lies Burrard Station, providing metro rail access to thousands of commuters daily via SkyTrain Expo Line. A short distance to the north is Waterfront Station which provides access to Seabus, West Coast Express commuter rail, and SkyTrain Canada Line.

== See also ==
- Downtown Vancouver
- Economy of Vancouver
