= Park Place (Vancouver) =

Office building in Vancouver, British Columbia

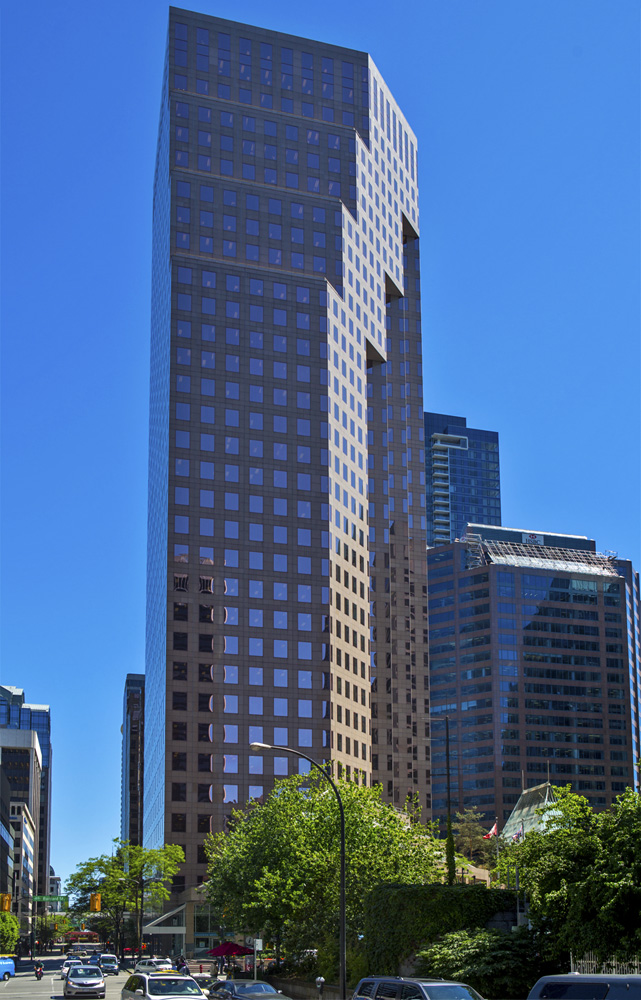
- Interactive map of the Park Place area

General information
- Status: Completed
- Type: Office, Retail
- Architectural style: Postmodern
- Location: 666 Burrard Street; Vancouver, British Columbia
- Coordinates: 49.284893°N 123.118875°W
- Completed: 1984

Height
- Roof: 140 m (459 ft)

Technical details
- Floor count: 35
- Floor area: 64,856 square metres (698,104 sq ft)

Website
- https://www.parkplace.ca

Park Place is a signature skyscraper located at 666 Burrard Street in Downtown Vancouver's Financial District. Park Place has 35 storeys, and was completed in 1984. It stands at 140 m (459 ft) and is one of the tallest buildings in the city. It is currently managed by QuadReal Property Group.

== Description ==
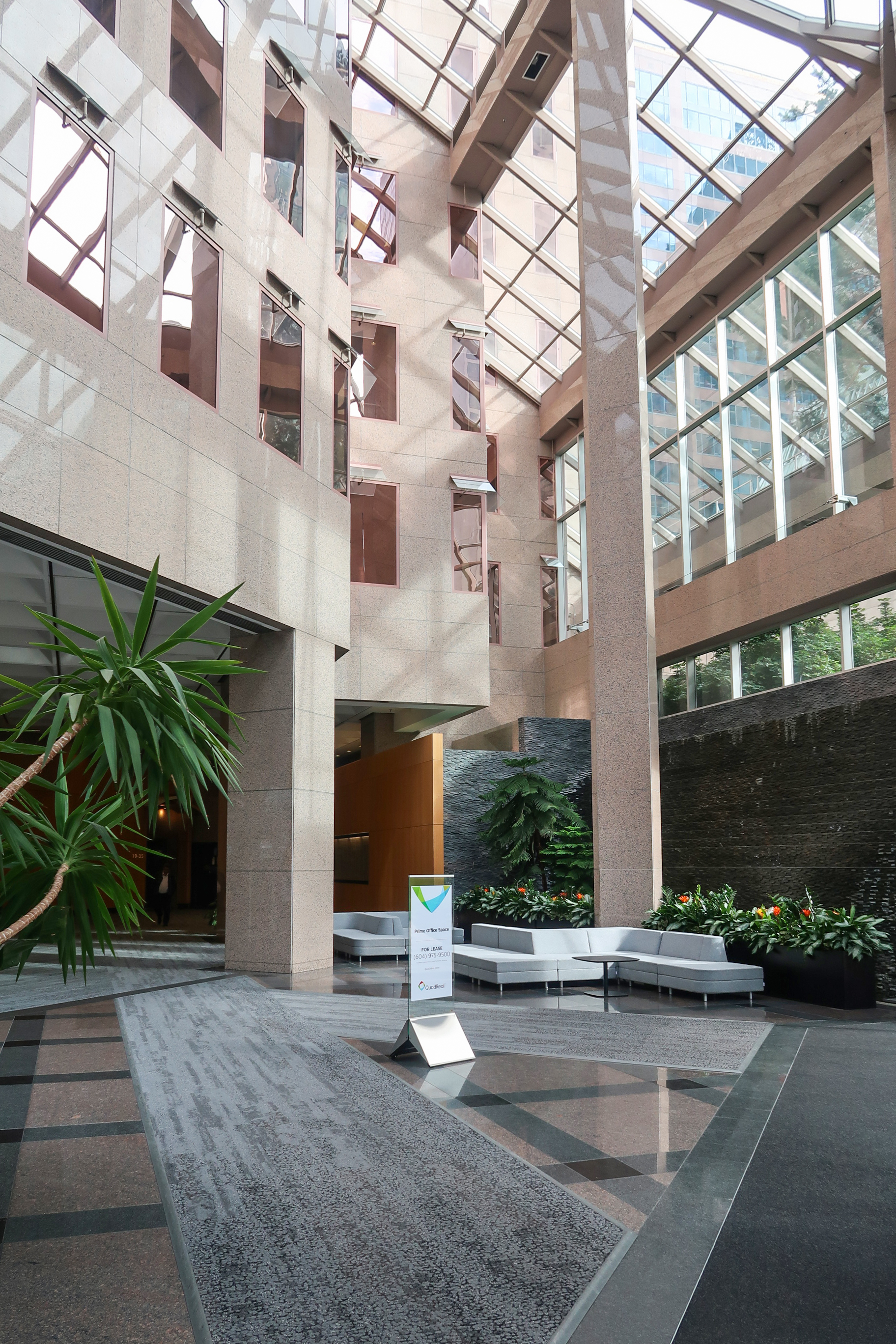
Entrance lobby

The building is located at the corner of Burrard Street and Dunsmuir Street, across the street from the Burrard SkyTrain station. Although the building only uses 35% of the site, at 64,856 square metres (698,100 ft^{2}) it is the largest office building in British Columbia. The rest of the site is dedicated to open green space, including water features and a small amphitheatre.

The Postmodern architecture of the building is expressed through its pink granite facade adorned with flush-mounted copper-glazed windows that match the granite's appearance. The building bears many similarities to the Brookfield Place in New York City, which was constructed around the same time.

This building is rare in its use of the address 666, because of the negative connotations of that number in North American culture. However, in Chinese culture 666 is considered one of the luckiest numbers. The decision was likely motivated by the city's large population of Chinese Canadians and strong ties to China, especially Hong Kong.

== Notable tenants ==
- Willis Towers Watson - multinational risk management, insurance brokerage and advisory company
- PI Financial - a regional investment firm
- DLA Piper- international law firm
- Stikeman Elliott LLP - international law firm
- RBC Capital Markets - the bank-owned dealer subsidiary of RBC Financial Group
- B2 Gold
- QuadReal Property Group - real estate
- Consulate General of Brazil
- Powerex - wholly owned energy marketing and trading subsidiary of BC Hydro

== See also ==
- List of tallest buildings in Vancouver
- Park Place, other places with the name
