= Cymax Group =

ECommerce company based in Burnaby

Cymax Group Technologies
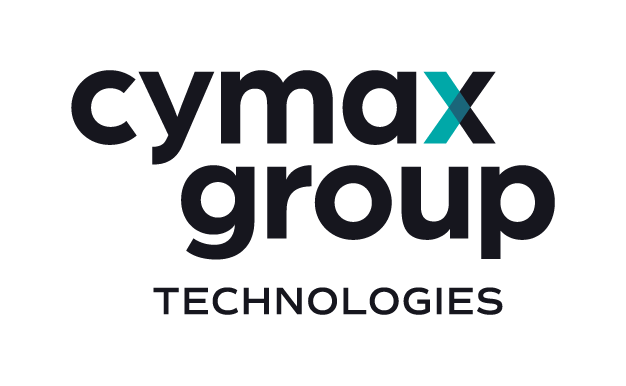
- Company type: Technology
- Industry: eCommerce
- Founded: 2004
- Founders: Arash Fasihi
- Successor: Markus Frind
- Headquarters: Vancouver, British Columbia, Canada
- Area served: International
- Key people: Markus Frind, Arash Fasihi
- Number of employees: 120 (2025)
- Website: www.cymaxgroup.com

Cymax Group Technologies Ltd. is a privately held eCommerce company headquartered in Vancouver, British Columbia, Canada. The Cymax Group of brands includes two retail websites, Cymax Business and Home Square, which sell furniture and decor; plus Freight Club and Channel Gate, which are eCommerce logistics and technology enablement platforms.

== History ==
Cymax Group was founded in 2004 by Arash Fasihi as an online retailer. The company developed a vendor portal and around 170 micro-sites. Currently, Cymax Group operates two online retail properties, Cymax Business and Home Square.

A Series A funding round in 2015, led by Frind Holdings, Salman Partners and BDC Capital Corporation, brought the organization's total funding amount to $25 million.

The same year, the company launched Freight Club in the US with 100+ carriers offering nationwide drop shipping services at enterprise rates. Freight Club offers application programming interfaces that integrate with core systems. In 2020, Freight Club launched a cart-level, real-time shipping quote integration on the Shopify app store.

In 2018, the company launched Channel Gate, offering a digital supply chain platform for furniture manufacturers.

== Ratings ==
- 2007 – Ranked 247th in the Internet Retailer Top 500 Internet Companies index
- 2008 – Ranked 200th in the Internet Retailer Top 500 Internet Companies index
- 2009 – Ranked 167th in the Internet Retailer Top 500 Internet Companies index
- 2010 – Ranked 168th in the Internet Retailer Top 500 Internet Companies index
