= Peanut (nickname) =

Peanut or Peanuts is the nickname of:

- Chiang Kai-shek (1887–1975), derisively called "Peanut" by U.S. Army General Joseph Stilwell
- Nick "Peanut" Baines (born 1978), English rock keyboardist
- Jim Davenport (1933–2016), American Major League Baseball player and coach
- Peanut Louie Harper (born 1960), American retired tennis player
- Peanuts Holland (1910–1979), American jazz trumpeter
- Peanuts Hucko (1918–2003), American jazz clarinetist
- Mamie Johnson (1935–2017), American baseball player, first female pitcher in the Negro leagues
- Erv Kantlehner (1892–1990), American Major League Baseball pitcher nicknamed "Peanuts"
- Paul Lehner (1920–1967), American Major League Baseball player, nicknamed "Peanuts"
- Peanuts Lowrey (1917–1986), American Major League Baseball player
- Peanuts O'Flaherty (1918–2008), Canadian National Hockey League player
- Ed Pinnance (1879–1944), Canadian Major League Baseball pitcher in 1903, nicknamed "Peanuts"
- Charles Tillman (born 1981), American National Football League player
