= Penn Township, Perry County, Pennsylvania =

Township in Pennsylvania, US

Coordinates: 40°22′00″N 77°02′59″W

- Township
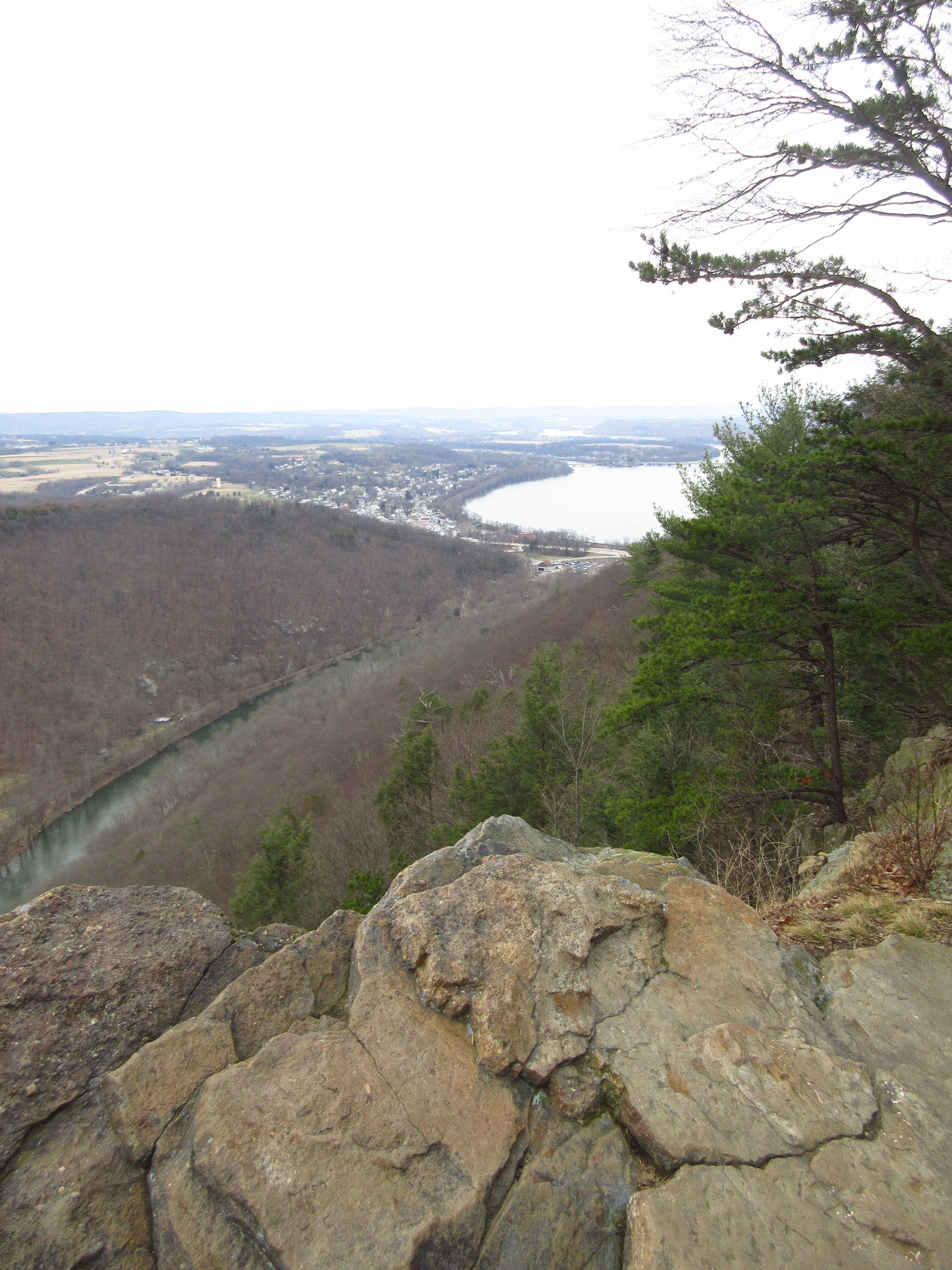
- Hawk Rock, a popular overlook accessed via the Appalachian Trail, is located in the township.

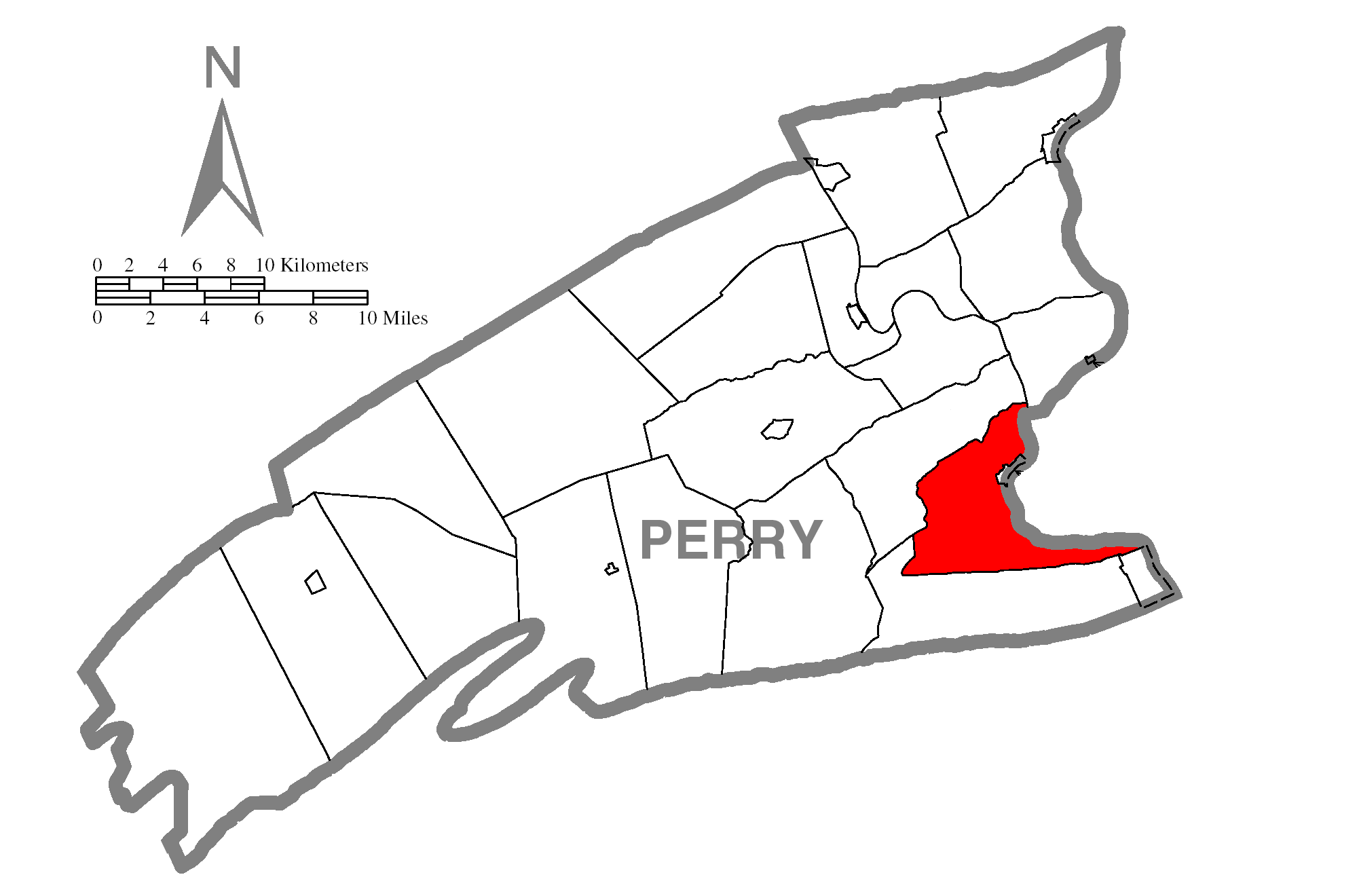
- Map of Perry County, Pennsylvania highlighting Penn Township

- Map of Perry County, Pennsylvania
- Country: United States
- State: Pennsylvania
- County: Perry
- Settled: 1732
- Incorporated: 1826

Government
  - Type: Board of Supervisors
  - Chairman: Mrs. Karen Potteiger
  - Supervisor: Mr. Forrest Woodward
  - Supervisor: Mr. John Keller

Area
  - Total: 21.48 sq mi (55.63 km^{2})
  - Land: 21.19 sq mi (54.88 km^{2})
  - Water: 0.29 sq mi (0.75 km^{2})

Population (2020)
  - Total: 3,100 ▼
  - Estimate (2023): 3,128
  - Density: 151.9/sq mi (58.64/km^{2})
- Time zone: UTC-5 (Eastern (EST))
  - Summer (DST): UTC-4 (EDT)
- Area code: 717
- FIPS code: 42-099-58856
- Website: https://www.penntownship.net/

Penn Township is a township in Perry County, Pennsylvania, United States. The population was 3,100 at the 2020 census.

== Geography ==
According to the United States Census Bureau, the township has a total area of 21.6 square miles (55.9 km^{2}), of which 21.4 square miles (55.5 km^{2}) is land and 0.2 square mile (0.4 km^{2}) (0.74%) is water. It is located along the right bank of the Susquehanna River, which Highway 11/15 follows. The township's villages include Aqueduct, Cove, Kinkora Heights, Losh Run (also in Miller Township,) Perdix.

== Demographics ==
Historical population
Census	Pop.	Note	%±
2010	3,225		—
2020	3,100		−3.9%
2023 (est.)	3,128		0.9%
U.S. Decennial Census

As of the census of 2000, there were 3,013 people, 1,159 households, and 846 families residing in the township. The population density was 140.5 inhabitants per square mile (54.2/km^{2}). There were 1,242 housing units at an average density of 57.9 per square mile (22.4/km^{2}). The racial makeup of the township was 98.54% White, 0.30% African American, 0.20% Native American, 0.10% Asian, 0.03% Pacific Islander, 0.03% from other races, and 0.80% from two or more races. Hispanic or Latino of any race were 0.33% of the population.

There were 1,159 households, out of which 32.4% had children under the age of 18 living with them, 59.3% were married couples living together, 8.9% had a female householder with no husband present, and 27.0% were non-families. 22.6% of all households were made up of individuals, and 10.1% had someone living alone who was 65 years of age or older. The average household size was 2.48 and the average family size was 2.90.

In the township the population was spread out, with 22.8% under the age of 18, 7.0% from 18 to 24, 29.1% from 25 to 44, 25.0% from 45 to 64, and 16.0% who were 65 years of age or older. The median age was 40 years. For every 100 females, there were 93.6 males. For every 100 females age 18 and over, there were 92.5 males.

The median income for a household in the township was $43,198, and the median income for a family was $51,627. Males had a median income of $35,819 versus $24,561 for females. The per capita income for the township was $19,457. About 4.6% of families and 5.4% of the population were below the poverty line, including 8.0% of those under age 18 and 7.1% of those age 65 or over.
