= Parkland, Pennsylvania =

- Unincorporated community Census designated place
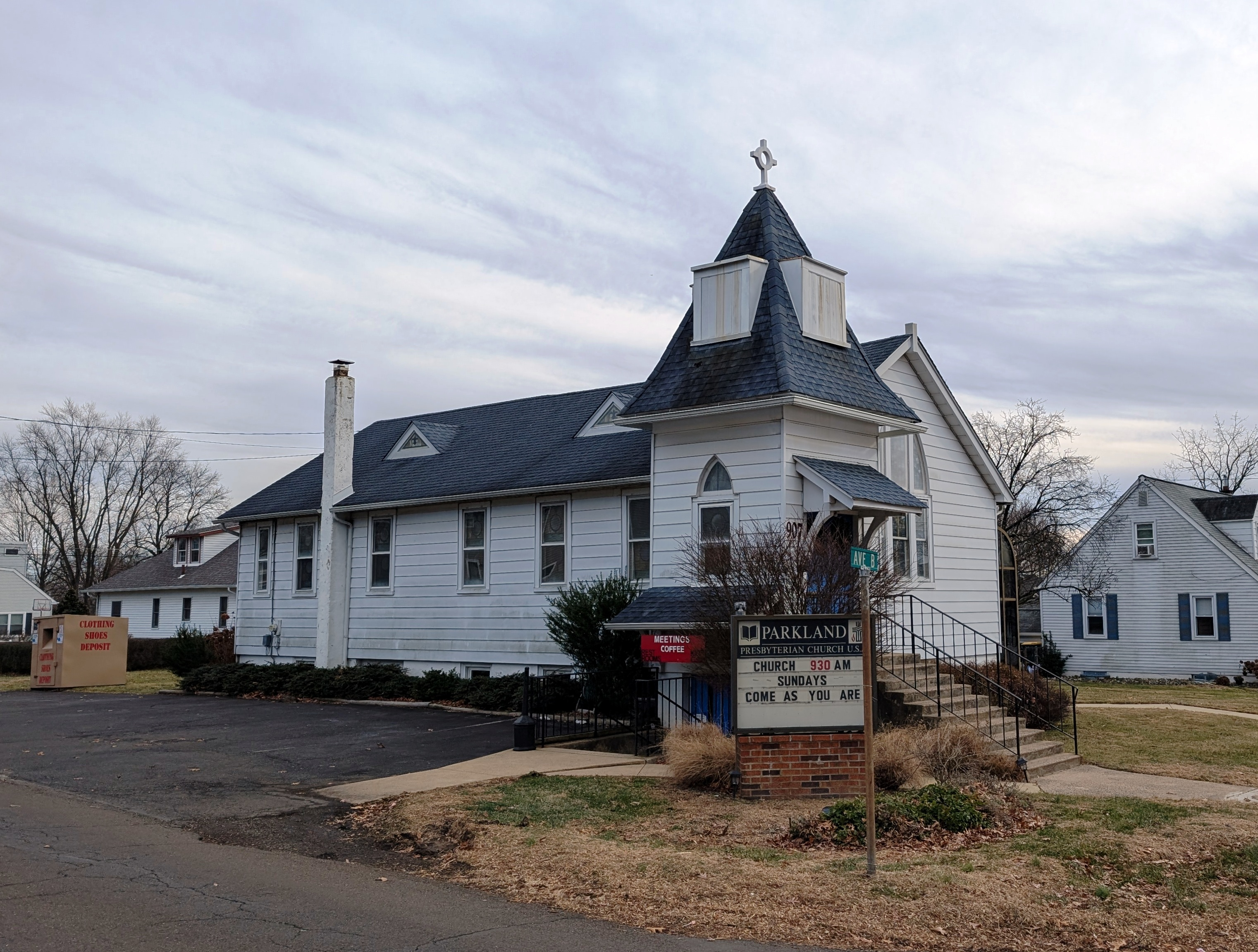
- Parkland Presbyterian Church

- Location within Pennsylvania Location within the United States
- Coordinates: 40°9′32.4″N 74°55′55.2″W
- Country: United States
- State: Pennsylvania
- County: Bucks
- Township: Middletown

Area
  - Total: 0.505 sq mi (1.31 km^{2})
  - Land: 0.505 sq mi (1.31 km^{2})
  - Water: 0.00 sq mi (0 km^{2})
- Elevation: 187 ft (57 m)
- Time zone: UTC-5 (Eastern (EST))
  - Summer (DST): UTC-4 (EDT)
- FIPS code: 4258088
- GNIS feature ID: 2830873

Parkland is an unincorporated community and census designated place (CDP) in Middletown Township, Bucks County, Pennsylvania.

== Demographics ==
Historical population
Census	Pop.	Note	%±
U.S. Decennial Census

The United States Census Bureau first defined Parkland as a census designated place in 2023.
