= Perdix, Pennsylvania =

Village in Pennsylvania, U.S.

Coordinates: 40°21′20″N 76°57′29″W

Perdix is a village between the Susquehanna River and Cove Mountain in Penn Township, Perry County, Pennsylvania, United States. U.S. Route 11/15 passes through the village, which uses the Duncannon zip code of 17020.
