= Peanut, Pennsylvania =

Unincorporated community in Pennsylvania, US

Peanut
- Unincorporated community
- Location within the state of Pennsylvania Peanut (the United States)
- Coordinates: 40°20′9″N 79°18′55″W
- Country: United States
- State: Pennsylvania
- County: Westmoreland
- Elevation: 1,178 ft (359 m)
- Time zone: UTC-5 (Eastern (EST))
  - Summer (DST): UTC-4 (EDT)
- GNIS feature ID: 1183422

Peanut is an unincorporated community and coal town in Westmoreland County, Pennsylvania, United States.

Peanut was, because of its name, chosen by the Peanut Advisory Board for a celebration of peanut butter and, on November 6, 1993, a 40-foot (12 m) long peanut butter and jelly sandwich – claimed to be the world's largest – was created in Peanut.
