= Park Place, Schuylkill County, Pennsylvania =

Census-designated place in Pennsylvania

Park Place
- Census-designated place
- Location within the U.S. state of Pennsylvania Park Place (the United States)
- Coordinates: 40°50′16.83″N 76°5′49.94″W
- Country: United States
- State: Pennsylvania
- County: Schuylkill
- Time zone: UTC−5 (Eastern (EST))
  - Summer (DST): UTC-4 (Eastern Daylight Time (EDT))

Park Place is a census-designated place (CDP) situated in the Mahanoy Township in Schuylkill County, Pennsylvania, United States. It has a population of approximately 5,029 residents and the population density is around 44 people per square mile. The community's median age is 42.5 years. The home in this area is valued at approximately $30,600, which is lower than both the state and national averages.

== Demographics ==
Historical population
| Census | Pop. | Note | %± |

The United States Census Bureau defined Park Place as a census designated place (CDP) in 2023.
