= Pikeville, Pennsylvania =

Unincorporated community in Pennsylvania, US

- Unincorporated community
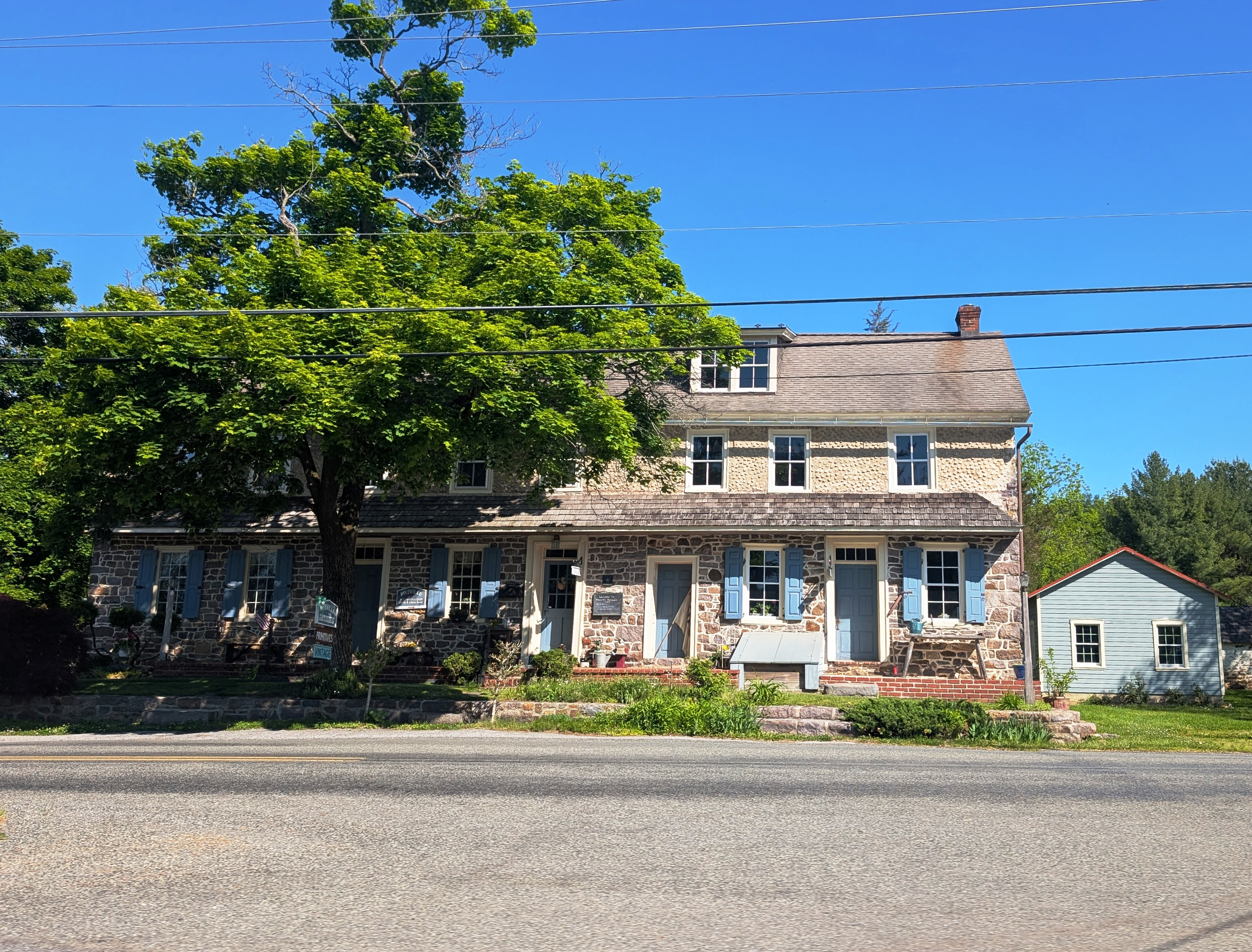
- Antique shop in Pikeville

- Location within Pennsylvania
- Coordinates: 40°23′54″N 75°43′25″W
- Country: United States
- State: Pennsylvania
- County: Berks
- Township: Pike
- Elevation: 371 ft (113 m)
- Time zone: UTC-5 (Eastern (EST))
  - Summer (DST): UTC-4 (EDT)
- Area codes: 610 and 484
- GNIS feature ID: 1183737

Pikeville is an unincorporated community in Pike Township in Berks County, Pennsylvania, United States. Pikeville is located near the intersection of Lobachsville Road and Oysterdale Road.

The community's name is derived from Pike Township.
