= Pittsville, Pennsylvania =

Unincorporated community in Pennsylvania, US

Pittsville
- Unincorporated community
- Location within the state of Pennsylvania Pittsville (the United States)
- Coordinates: 41°15′22″N 79°44′26″W
- Country: United States
- State: Pennsylvania
- County: Venango
- Township: Rockland
- Elevation: 1,309 ft (399 m)
- Time zone: UTC-5 (Eastern (EST))
  - Summer (DST): UTC-4 (EDT)
- GNIS feature ID: 1183983

Pittsville is an unincorporated community located within Rockland Township, Venango County, Pennsylvania.
