= Paupack, Pennsylvania =

Unincorporated community in Pennsylvania, US

- Unincorporated community
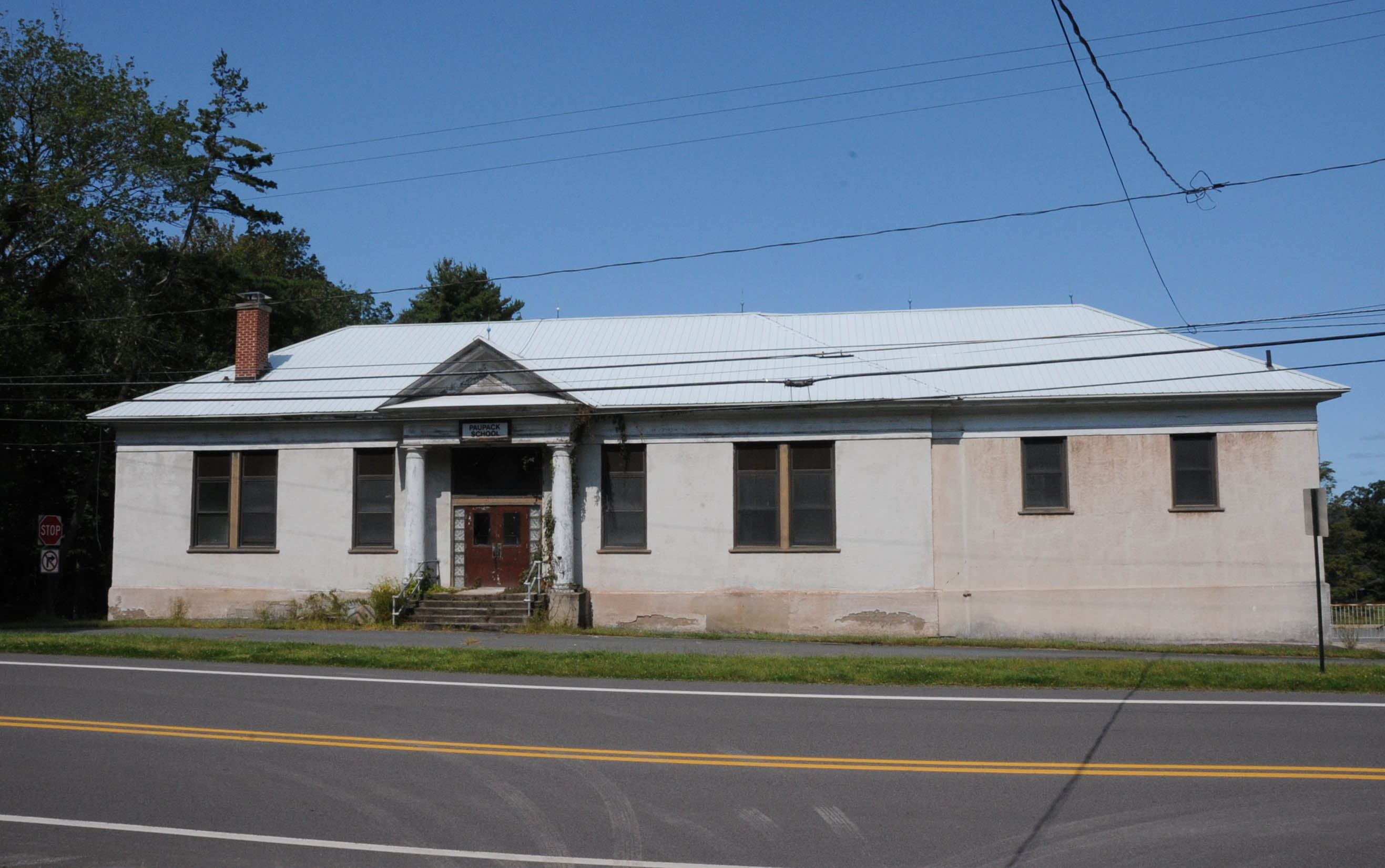
- Paupack School

- Location within Pennsylvania
- Coordinates: 41°23′46″N 75°11′47″W
- Country: United States
- State: Pennsylvania
- County: Pike
- Elevation: 1,565 ft (477 m)
- Time zone: UTC-5 (Eastern (EST))
  - Summer (DST): UTC-4 (EDT)
- ZIP code: 18451
- Area codes: 272 & 570
- GNIS feature ID: 1199282

Paupack is an unincorporated community in Pike County, Pennsylvania, United States. The community is 5.5 miles (8.9 km) south of Hawley. Paupack has a post office with ZIP code 18451, which opened on October 19, 1900. The community derives its name from Wallenpaupack Creek. The area was originally served by Paupack Consolidated School, which dates back to 1925 and is on the National Register of Historic Places.
