= Holt Renfrew Centre =

- Interactive map of the Holt Renfrew Centre area

General information
- Status: Open
- Type: Shopping mall
- Location: 50–60 Bloor Street West, Toronto, Ontario, Canada
- Coordinates: 43.670389°N 79.388317°W
- Opened: 1979; 47 years ago
- Renovated: 1996
- Owner: Morguard
- Management: Morguard

Technical details
- Floor count: 4
- Floor area: 274,914 square feet (25,540.3 m^{2}) of gross leasable area

Other information
- Number of stores: 39
- Number of anchors: 1
- Public transit access: Bloor–Yonge: Line 1 Yonge–University; Line 2 Bloor–Danforth

Website
- holtrenfrewcentre.com

The Holt Renfrew Centre is a shopping mall on Bloor Street West in downtown Toronto, Ontario, Canada, on the Mink Mile in the Yorkville neighbourhood. It opened in 1979, and is owned and managed by Morguard. The mall spans approximately 275,000 square feet (25,500 m^{2}) of gross leasable area, of which 190,000 square feet (18,000 m^{2}) is occupied by the Holt Renfrew flagship store. The Path pedestrian tunnel connects the mall to facilities including the nearby Bloor–Yonge station serving the Toronto subway, and the 2 Bloor East complex.

== History ==
The mall originated with the opening of the Holt Renfrew flagship store at 50 Bloor Street West in March 1979. It cost CA$6,000,000 (equivalent to CA$23,565,000 in 2023) to build and spanned 85,000 square feet (7,900 m^{2}) of selling space. The store replaced the previous Toronto location at 144 Bloor Street West, and overtook the previous flagship store on Sherbrooke Street in Montreal when that city declined in economic performance. The basement level that was later built connected the mall to the Path pedestrian tunnel system, which itself is connected to facilities including the nearby Bloor–Yonge subway station and The Bay then-flagship store (now closed) in the Hudson's Bay Centre (now 2 Bloor East).

A street-level escalator previously existed that connected directly to the basement level. It has since been incorporated into the Aritzia store, which expanded into the adjacent, former BCBGMAXAZRIA store and reopened as its 10,700-square-foot (990 m^{2}) Canadian flagship store on 14 February 2019. HMV also operated a record shop in this section from 1997 until 2016.

== Performance ==
As of March 2023, the Holt Renfrew Centre exceeds 6.4 million annual visitors and $994 in sales per square foot. The Retail Council of Canada classified the property as a "highly productive mall" in downtown Toronto, alongside Royal Bank Plaza and Toronto Eaton Centre, in 2016.

== Proposed skyscraper ==
Morguard and WZMH Architects proposed a 755-foot (230 m) skyscraper, inspired by Rockefeller Center in New York City, above the existing Holt Renfrew Centre in 2013. Office space would be added to the retail space on the lower levels, and the upper levels would house 600 residential units, bringing the entire property to 1,513,000 square feet (140,600 m^{2}). The municipal government recommended approval of the rezoning application in July 2014, however, the project has yet to materialize as of April 2025.
