= Two Bloor West =

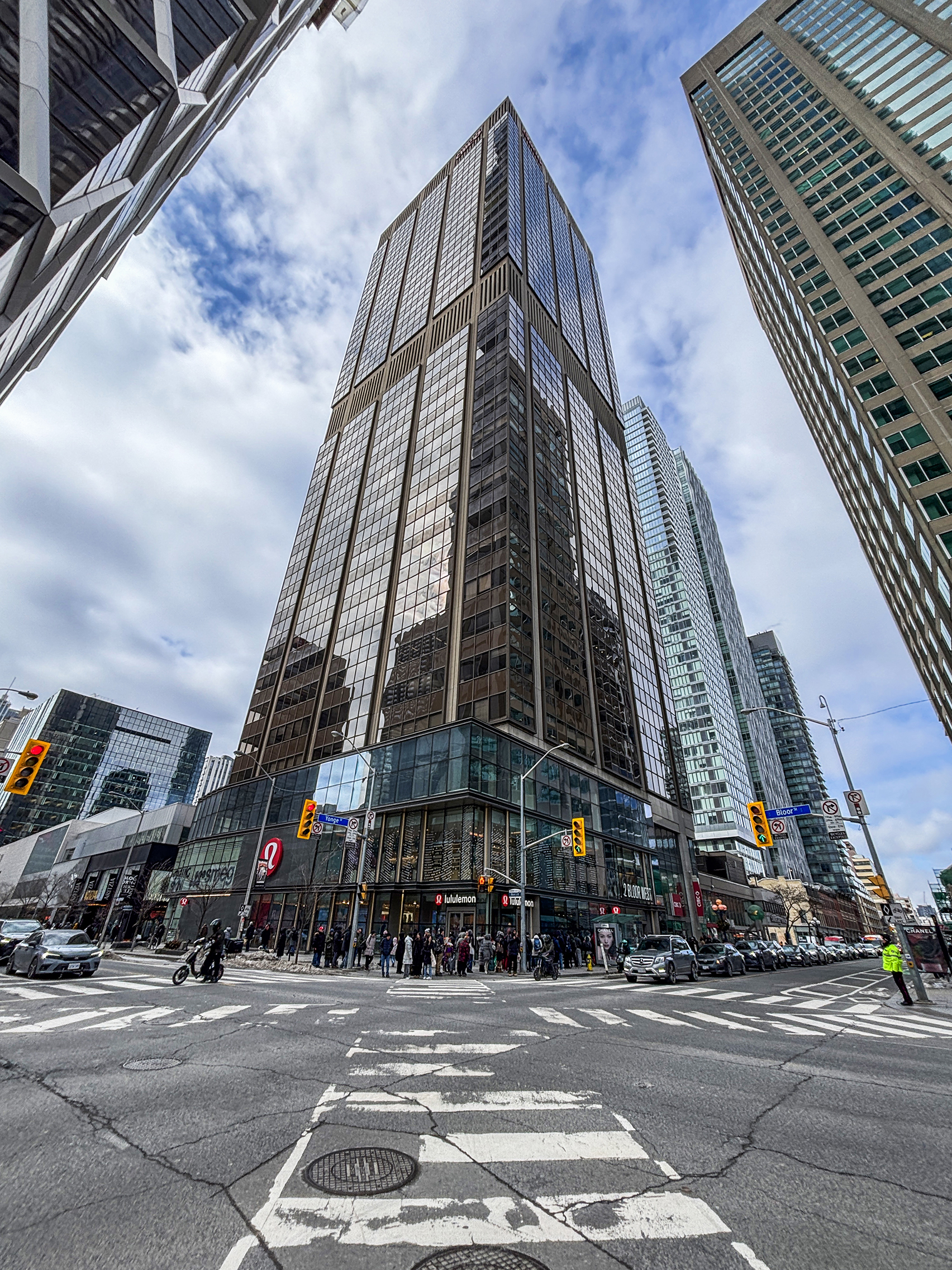
- Interactive map of the Two Bloor West area
- Alternative names: CIBC Building

General information
- Type: Commercial offices
- Location: 2 Bloor Street West; Toronto, Ontario, Canada
- Coordinates: 43.6702°N 79.3872°W
- Completed: 1972
- Management: Triovest Realty Advisors Inc.

Height
- Roof: 148.74 m (488.0 ft)

Technical details
- Floor count: 34
- Lifts/elevators: 10

Design and construction
- Architects: Ogus and Fisher; Peter Caspari

Other information
- Public transit access: Bloor–Yonge station

Two Bloor West is a 34-storey office tower in Toronto, Ontario. It is sometimes referred to as Toronto's CIBC building, but that name can also refer to Commerce Court.

Located at the intersection of Yonge and Bloor along the Mink Mile, 2 Bloor Street West is a 34 storey "A" class office tower in the heart of mid-town Toronto. The building features floor plates of approximately 1,208 m^{2} (13,000 sq ft), a renovated main lobby and a vast array of shops and services. 2 Bloor Street West has direct underground access to Bloor–Yonge station, the Bloor Street underground pedestrian walkway and is located steps away from Yorkville's shops, restaurants and hotels. It has 40,133 m^{2} (431,990 sq ft) of space and is managed by Triovest Realty Advisors Inc.

The building was completed in 1972 and underwent renovations in 1986.

== History ==
The tower was a project of Bloorwest Holdings Limited, which was a subsidiary of Oddenino's Property and Investment Company Limited of London, England. Construction was carried out by V. K. Mason Limited. The building cost $20 million.

== Anchor tenants ==
- BBDO
- CDI (Career Development Institute)
- RAC (Ronald A. Chisholm)
- Ministry of Community & Social Services
- Canadian Imperial Bank of Commerce (CIBC)

== Consulates ==
- Spain (12th floor)
- Czech Republic (15th floor)
- Chile (18th floor)
- Denmark (21st floor)
- Norway (21st floor)
- Sweden (21st floor)
- France (22nd floor)
- Germany (25th floor)

== See also ==
- 2 Bloor East
- One Bloor - neighbouring condominium at 1 Bloor E
- One Bloor West - approved construction project at intersection
