= Holt Renfrew =

Canadian department store

Holt, Renfrew & Co., Limited

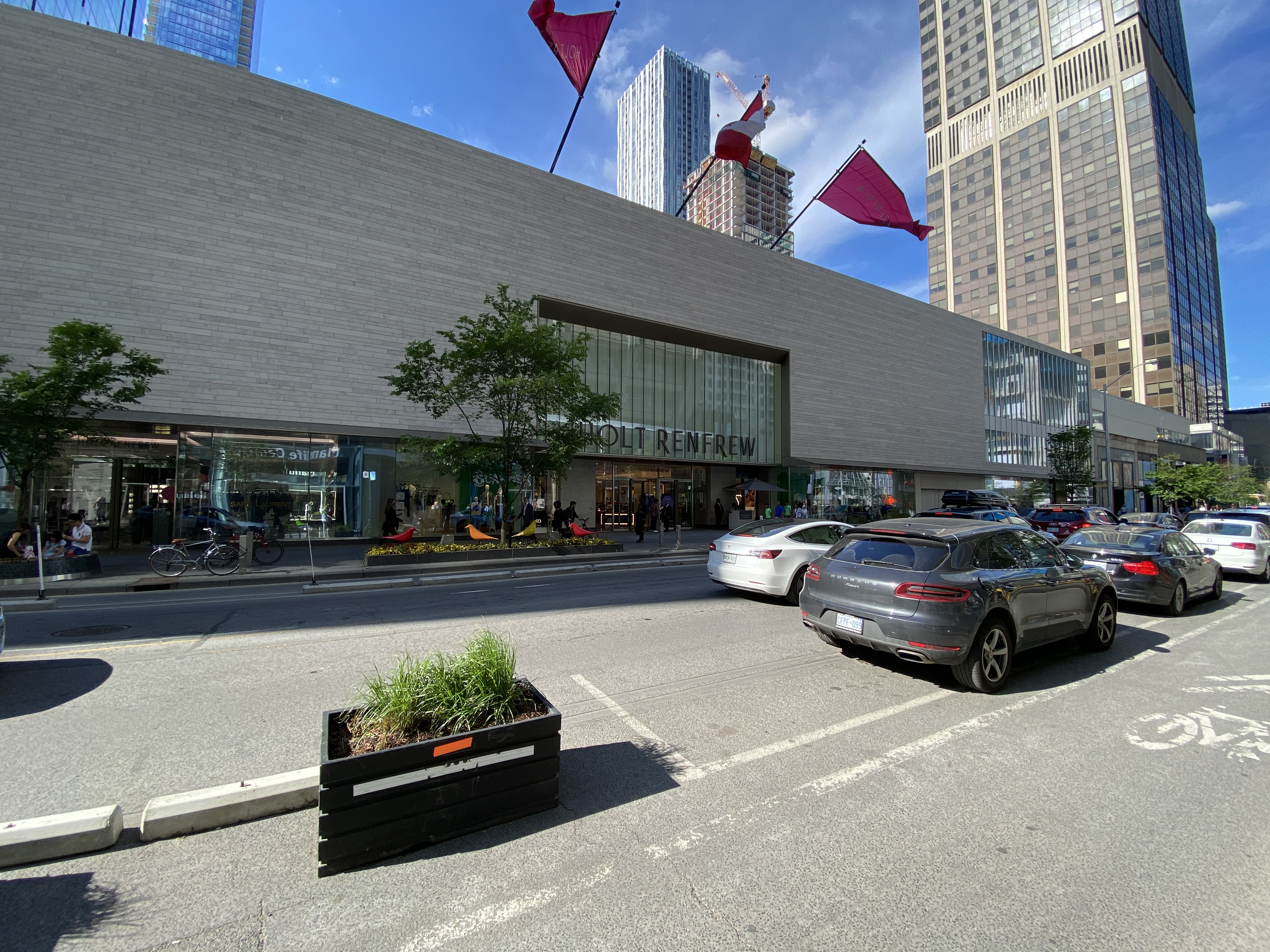
- Flagship store on Mink Mile in Yorkville, Toronto (2022)
- Trade name: Holt Renfrew
- Formerly: William Ashton & Co.; William S. Henderson & Co.; John Henderson & Co.; Henderson, Renfrew & Co.; Renfrew & Marcou; G.R. Renfrew & Co.
- Type: Private
- Industry: Retail
- Founded: 1837; 189 years ago in Quebec City, Lower Canada
- Founder: William S. Henderson
- Headquarters: 60 Bloor Street West, Toronto, Ontario, Canada
- Number of locations: 6 (2024)
- Area served: Canada
- Products: Clothing; accessories; footwear; fragrances; jewellery; beauty products
- Owner: Weston family (1986–present)
- Parent: Wittington Investments (1986–present)
- Website: holtrenfrew.com

Holt, Renfrew & Co., Limited (doing business as Holt Renfrew and colloquially Holt's) is a Canadian luxury department store chain founded in 1837 by William S. Henderson. The original William Ashton & Co. store in Quebec City, Lower Canada (now Quebec) operated as a fur shop. The company serviced the greater North American and European markets with its mail order catalog beginning in the late 1800s, and was appointed Furriers in Ordinary to several members of the British royal family from 1886 to 1921.

The present-day Holt Renfrew name comes from the additions of business partner George Richard Renfrew in 1862, and company president John Henderson Holt in 1900. The company became a full-line retailer with the opening of the multi-level Sherbrooke Street store in Montreal in 1937. It was acquired by Wittington Investments (owned by the Weston family) in 1986, and was affiliated with the European department stores Selfridges, Brown Thomas, and de Bijenkorf until the Weston family divested of the Selfridges Group in 2022. As of 2024, Holt Renfrew operates six department stores in four Canadian provinces, including the flagship store at the Holt Renfrew Centre on Bloor Street West in Toronto and the former Ogilvy store (now Holt Renfrew Ogilvy) on Saint Catherine Street in Montreal.

Holt Renfrew and Simons, both founded in the 1800s in Quebec City, are the only Canadian department stores operating as of June 2025. Holt Renfrew is comparable to American department stores Nordstrom, Neiman Marcus and Saks Fifth Avenue.

== 19th-century history ==
In 1837, William S. Henderson, an Irish-born merchant, bought his partners' interest in their Quebec City fur shop and went into business for himself, thereby marking the traditional founding date of Holt Renfrew. Three years earlier, Henderson had arrived by ship from Londonderry with a load of hats and caps. The merchandise sold well and other overseas crossings followed. Eventually, Henderson set up shop at Quebec under the name William Ashton & Co. An early company advertisement noted a line of wholesale and retail garments and accessories that included Ladies' fur muffs, boas and tippets, in addition to Buffalo Robes and Bear skins, procured as well as "manufactured on this premises." By 1847, the store, then renamed William S. Henderson & Co., had established itself at 12 Buade Street. Eventually the store moved to larger premises at 35 Buade where it remained for many years. Over the decades that followed, the store's ownership changed hands, as various partners came and went, and the firm's name underwent revision. W.S. Henderson eventually sold the store to his brother John, a Montreal businessman, and it became John Henderson & Co. In 1862, with the addition of business partner George Richard Renfrew, the store's name changed to Henderson, Renfrew and Company. By the time of Confederation, in 1867, Henderson had retired and Renfrew and V.H. Marcou, whom Henderson had sent to Quebec to manage the business, had become the new principals, with the firm renamed Renfrew & Marcou.

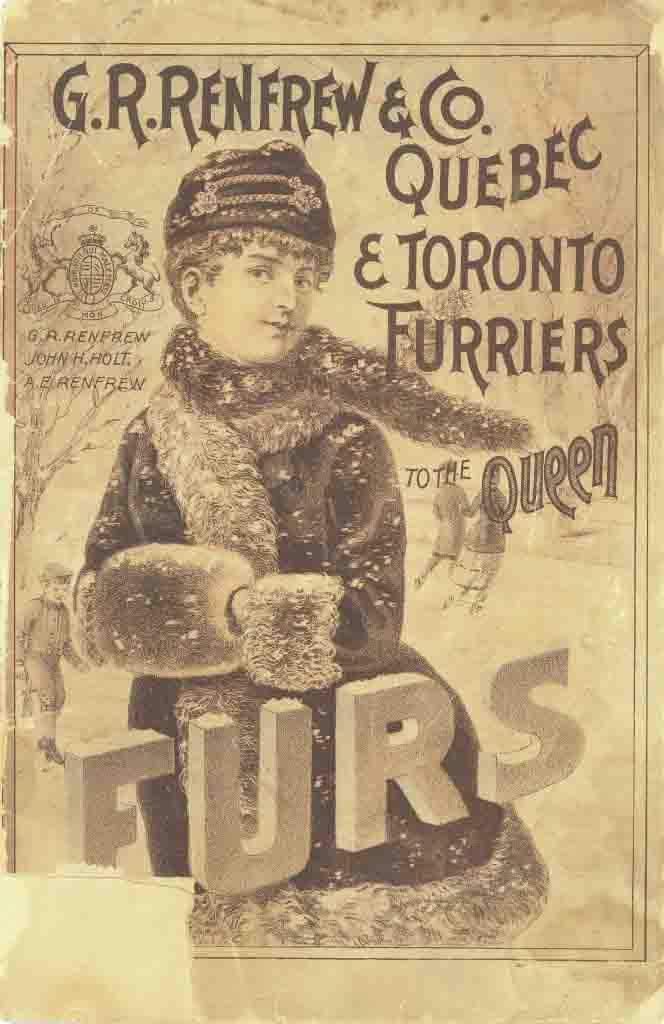
Cover for a Holt Renfrew catalogue in 1890, advertising that the company is the "furriers to the Queen"

By the middle of the 19th century, the company had begun promoting its fur garments beyond Quebec to a larger North American and European market. An 1890 mail order fur catalogue listed nine different medals and diplomas won at London, Paris, and Philadelphia exhibitions from 1851 to 1888. During its history, the store served many notable patrons. Admirers of John A. Macdonald, Canada's first Prime Minister, had decided the coat he had worn during an 1883 visit to Quebec City was not befitting his status as first minister and bought him a new fur coat from the company. Then, in 1886, G.R. Renfrew & Co. received its most prestigious honour, being named "Furriers in Ordinary" by Her Majesty Queen Victoria. The Queen had purchased a number of fur items from the company's display at the Indian & Colonial Exhibition held that year at London, England. The Quebec Daily Telegraph wrote at length about the appointment:

Visitors to the late provincial exhibition in this city will remember that lithographed copies in duplicate were shown of the royal letters patent from the Mistress of the Robes at Windsor Castle, notifying Messrs. G.R. Renfrew & Co. of their appointment as furriers to the Queen. At the same exhibition this firm exposed a duplicate set in sable to that purchased from them by Her Majesty the Queen in person, at the Indian & Colonial Exhibition in London. In common with many of our readers, we are not of opinion that a firm, any more than a private individual is the better individually, for rubbing against royalty, but we are speaking of business affairs in a business sense, and there is no doubt that Queen Victoria would not have patronized Messrs. G.R. Renfrew & Co. when she wanted a new muff, nor appointed them as her special furriers, unless she was satisfied that their articles were the very best of the kind manufactured, and that she could not do as well elsewhere. It is upon the knowledge of these facts that we congratulate Messrs. G.R. Renfrew & Co., and feel a legitimate pride in the success of our fellow citizens abroad. At home their success is exemplified by the large number of awards made [by] their exhibits, and also by the splendid stock which they always keep on hand in the mammoth establishment.

It was, in fact, the first of a series of royal warrants issued by members of the British royal family. In 1901, Holt, Renfrew & Co. was appointed furriers to Her Majesty Queen Alexandra and then to His Royal Highness the Prince of Wales, later King Edward VII, in 1903. In 1910, the company was appointed by royal warrant furriers to His Majesty King George V. The last of the royal warrants was issued by the Prince of Wales, later King Edward VIII, in 1921.

In 1889, the company established its first store outside of Quebec City with a new retail outlet at 71 and 73 King Street East, Toronto. William Henderson had by this time retired and his nephew, Allen E. Renfrew, had become partner.

== 20th-century history ==
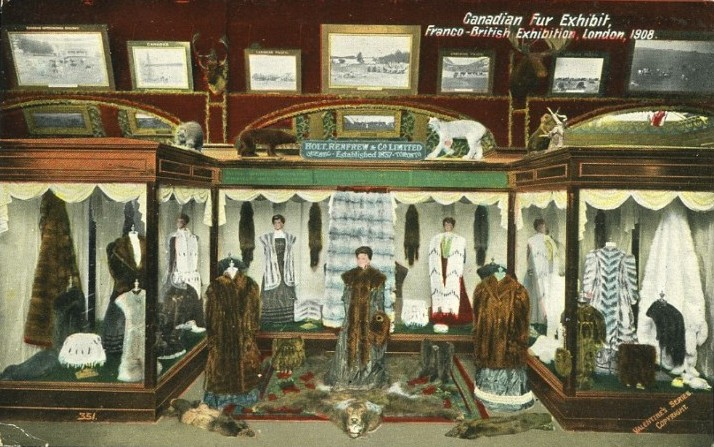
Holt Renfrew's Canadian fur display at the Franco-British Exhibition in 1908

In 1900, John Henderson Holt, who began his career as a company clerk, was appointed president and the firm became known as Holt, Renfrew & Co. By 1908, the company's structure had changed again and it had become Holt, Renfrew & Co., Limited. Meanwhile, the company continued to display its furs at various international expositions, such as the Franco-British Exhibition, held in London, England, that same year. Described as a "great merger of fur firms" by the press, in 1910 Holt Renfrew acquired Dunlop, Cook Co. Limited, and established new premises at Montreal, on fashionable St. Catherine St. W., in addition to taking over the firm of W. J. Hammond, "the largest fur house in the West," at Winnipeg, Manitoba. With the death of John H. Holt in 1915, A.E. Renfrew was appointed company president, a position he held until his retirement in 1919.

In 1937, in conjunction with the company's 100th anniversary, Holt Renfrew unveiled a new six-storey Montreal headquarters and flagship store. Designed by the Canadian architectural firm of Ross and Macdonald, the structure was built in what became known as the Streamline Moderne style of Art Deco. Women’s Wear Daily wrote of the limestone structure, located at the corner of Sherbrooke and Mountain streets, as "one of the most modernly and attractively appointed retail establishments on this continent" and further commented that "throughout the store the aim has been to secure an effect of luxury and good taste." Press reports also noted the new store's commitment to haute couture and how "New York fashions, as well as London and Paris models, are represented in the dress, coat, sportswear, millinery and other fashion departments." Holt Renfrew also retailed the work of Canadian high-fashion designers such as Marie-Paule Nolin, whose salon and workroom were hosted by the store during the 1940s.

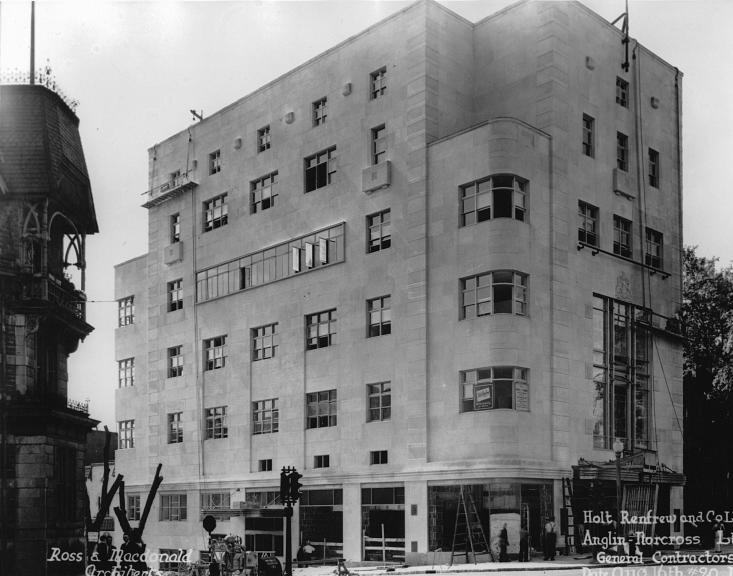
The company's Art Deco-styled flagship store in Montreal in 1937.

With the outbreak of armed conflict in Europe and Canada's early entry into World War II, Holt Renfrew's fashion reflected the new homefront realities. With the rationing of textiles and other materials, the company's designs featured shorter sleeves and raised hemlines. Retail expansion during this time was muted, with the exception of Holt Renfrew's acquisition of Simon Furs of Ottawa in 1945.

=== After World War II ===
The conclusion of war saw Holt Renfrew re-emerge as Canada's leading furrier and fashion retailer, closely associated with the haute couture of the post-war era. In 1947, on the eve of the impending marriage of Princess Elizabeth, heir to the British throne, and Prince Philip, the company was commissioned by the Canadian government to design the country's official wedding gift for the princess. President Alvin J. Walker flew to London, England, with a selection of 85 samples to personally show and take measurements for the Labrador wild mink coat.

Early in the post-war period, Holt Renfrew re-established close working relationships with the leading fashion houses of Europe and North America. By 1947, Alvin Walker signed an agreement with the House of Christian Dior to sell its Paris haute couture in Canada. With Dior's "New Look," and its renewed emphasis on luxury and femininity in women's fashion making headlines, it was the beginning of an extended relationship that "linked the name of Holt Renfrew to the most famous fashion designer in the world at the time." The arrangement soon evolved into an exclusive one as Walker secured an agreement to solely represent Dior in the Canadian marketplace. Newspaper ads for Dior fashion explicitly noted, "only at Holt Renfrew in all of Canada." Along with Dior, the couture models of other well-known Paris designers were also featured:

Holt Renfrew's own fashionists attended the recent Winter Openings of the leading couturiers in Paris. The models selected by them are here...they have arrived by air express. This collection...the largest ever imported by H.R...presents a composite and perfect picture of the New Fashion created by Paris...the dramatic "Wing Line" by CHRISTIAN DIOR...the lovely subtle straightline with sudden flare sponsored by PIERRE BALMAIN...the flattering backward drapery by JACQUES FATH...the sylph-line skirt and Bryonic corsage by MOLYNEUX...the higher waistline ROBERT PIGUET...the tubular skirt with stiffened pockets by JACQUES GRIFFE...and the most perfect black dresses by BALENCIAGA. Included are all types of costumes from the typically Parisian tailleur...for the morning promenade in the Bois...to gay short evening dresses and formal gowns with daring decolletes and short irregular trains.

Holt Renfrew also secured exclusive Canadian rights to the haute couture of Italian designers Simonetta Visconti and Fabiani. Its representatives not only made frequent trips to the fashion houses of Paris, London, New York and Milan but also attended all major fur and fashion shows. One magazine writer commented on how the "eternal watchfulness of Holt Renfrew buyers on the world's fashion fronts and their close liaison with outstanding designers and creators of fashions plays an important part in the rapidly growing roster of Holt Renfrew customers." The company hosted some of the leading international designers. In 1952, Mr. Christian Dior was guest of honour at Holts in Montreal. Three years later, Dior was present for a fashion show of his creations at Holt Renfrew's new Toronto store, located along the Mink Mile at 144 Bloor Street West – the country's first ever all stainless steel building, noteworthy for its "modern facade of blue glass and gleaming material." Dior models, from Paris and New York, were specially flown in for the runway event.

=== 1950–1999 ===
The 1950s, also saw the retailer establish new stores in secondary markets, including Edmonton in 1950, Calgary and London in 1953. The chain also opened outlets in some of the country's most prominent luxury hotels, including the Royal York, the Chateau Frontenac, and the Château Laurier.

The 1960s, saw Holt Renfrew build on its reputation as a high-end luxury retailer, closely associated with the leading European fashion houses. In 1962, the company announced that it had secured an exclusive agreement to represent Paris designer Yves Saint Laurent and his haute couture in Canada. At the same time, the chain promoted new, more affordable, ready-to-wear fashion designed to attract a younger clientele. It established in-store shops for its Miss Renfrew line, marketed to "Young Careerists, College Girls, and Young Matrons," who wished to dress fashionably on a budget.

Holt Renfrew's retail expansion continued with mall openings at Toronto's Yorkdale Shopping Centre in 1964, and Place Ste-Foy, Quebec City, in 1965. By the mid-Sixties, Holt Renfrew experienced a change of ownership with the announcement that the Canadian Acceptance Corporation, a wholly owned subsidiary of C.I.T. Financial of New York, had acquired 93 percent of the company's shares – that after a brief period of ownership by English retailer Blackett & Son Ltd. In 1971, Canadian Acceptance Corporation sold Holt Renfrew to Los Angeles-based department store holding company Broadway-Hale (later renamed Carter Hawley Hale).

The decade also saw a change in leadership as Alvin J. Walker retired after 25 years as company president in 1967. He was succeeded by Lenard M. Shavick. Shavick, who joined Holt Renfrew in the post-war years as a buyer, saw to the chain's continued close relationship with the fashion houses of Europe and North America with frequent buying trips aboard. "Every year, Shavick makes three or four trips to the fashion capitals while his staff of 18 buyers follow through with as many as 60 or 70 of their own." Shavick further saw to the expansion of the chain's retail footprint with eleven new stores for a total of 23 outlets by 1971. He unveiled Holt Renfrew's first West Coast store at the new Pacific Centre, Vancouver, British Columbia, in 1975. Four years later, he oversaw the development of the company's new Toronto flagship store, at 50 Bloor Street West, with some 73,000 square feet (6,800 m^{2}) of retail space, at a cost of $6.5 million. In 1983, the chain's Edmonton branch opened a $6 million, 45,000-square-foot (4,200 m^{2}) store in Manulife Place – the city's newest and tallest building.

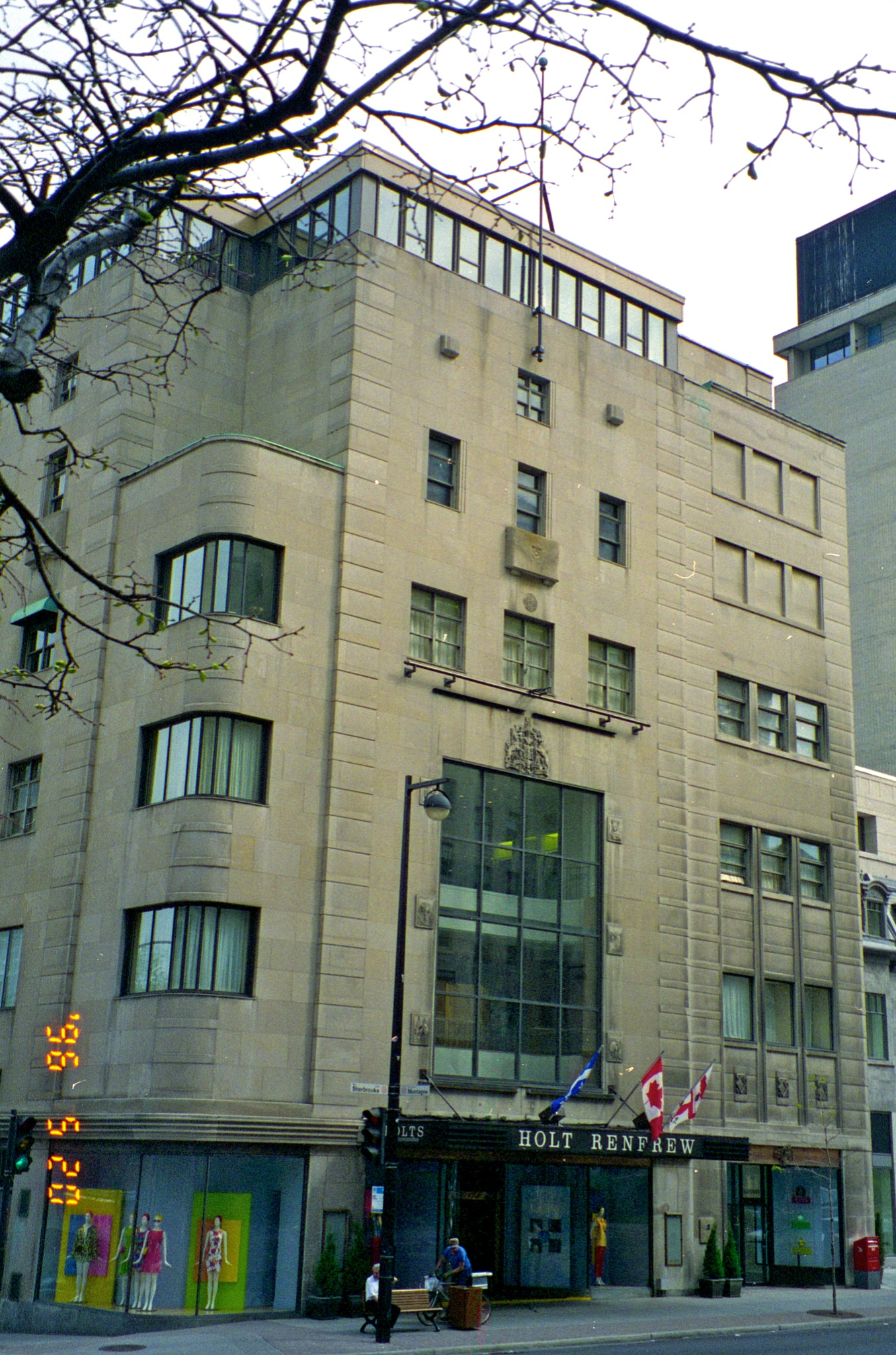
Holt Renfew's store in Montreal in 2007. The company did restoration work to the building during the 1980s.

The 1980s, saw Holt Renfrew return to Canadian ownership after Carter Hawley Hale of Los Angeles put Holt, its only foreign asset, up for sale. In April 1986, an agreement with Wittington Investments Limited, a Weston family holding company led by W. Galen Weston, was announced. With Michael Brickell as company president, Galen Weston as chairman and wife Hilary M. Weston as vice-chairman, the chain underwent dramatic changes, including the introduction of new retail formats and extensive interior renovations to its lead Toronto and Montreal stores. The new owners gutted some 7,000 square feet (650 m^{2}) at the Bloor Street West flagship to accommodate new designer boutiques, as the retailer moved to restore a sense of luxury and intimacy. They hired New York retail designer Naomi Leff to guide the renovations and changes to its merchandising mix. In Montreal, they began work to revitalize the grandeur of the original 1937 Art Deco architecture of the Sherbrooke St. store and added Giorgio Armani and Yves Saint Laurent shops to both Toronto and Montreal. A new high-end Holt Renfrew retail magazine, called "Point of View," was launched a year later.

The 1990s, under president Joel Rath, saw further expansion with some 62 thousand square feet of retail space added, in particular to Holt's landmark Montreal store. The Sherbrooke Street site doubled its space in a $30 million expansion that pushed into adjoining buildings to accommodate luxury brand boutiques including Chanel. The decade closed with the appointment of veteran British retailer Andrew Jennings as company president. Jennings vowed to make Holt Renfrew "one of the world's great fashion and lifestyle stores."

== 21st-century history ==
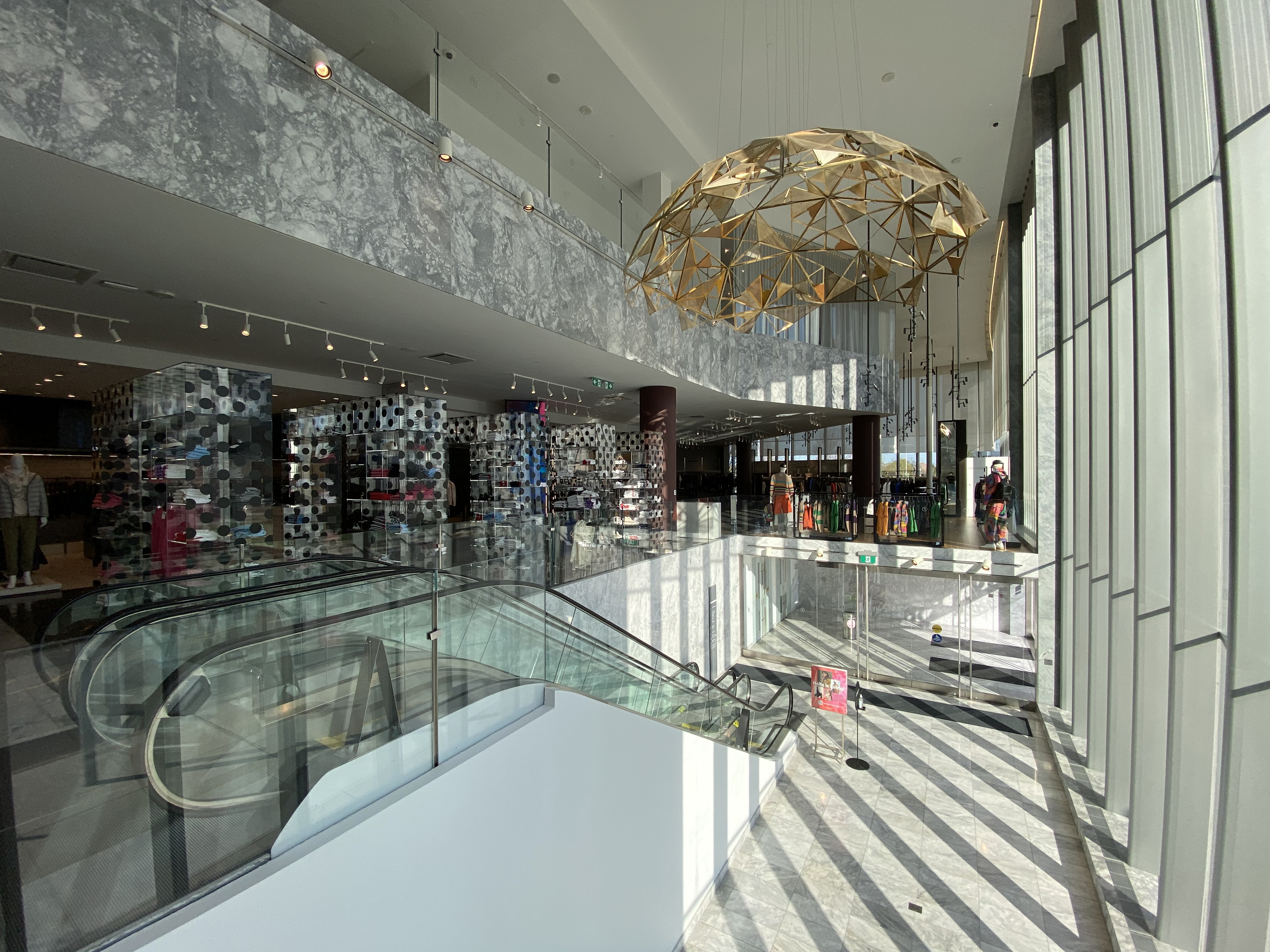
Interior of the Holt Renfrew at Square One Shopping Centre in Mississauga

The company entered the new millennium with the relaunch of its retail magazine under the name "Holts." The seasonal publication became separate women's and men's editions in 2006. Holt Renfrew also began sponsoring a series of large scale promotional events. In 2002, it hosted 'Viva Italia,' a celebration of Italian fashion and the performing arts. A year later, the retailer marked 'Flick,' a Sixites theme gala that coincided with the Toronto International Film Festival. In 2004, Holt Renfrew and Vanity Fair presented 'Vinyl,' a "hot pink, style-in-the-groove" celebration of music and fashion.

With the departure of Andrew Jennings, Caryn Lerner took over as president in 2004. Lerner, the first woman to lead Holt Renfrew, had previously held senior management positions at QVC, Jones New York, Barneys New York and Bloomingdale's and Escada. In 2005, Holt Renfrew underwent an extensive rebranding. Led by Alannah Weston, creative director at Selfridges and daughter of Holt Renfew chairman W. Galen Weston, a new logo, reflecting the company's historic past, and magenta colour was adopted across the chain. Other changes included the return of children's wear and more retail space devoted to footwear.

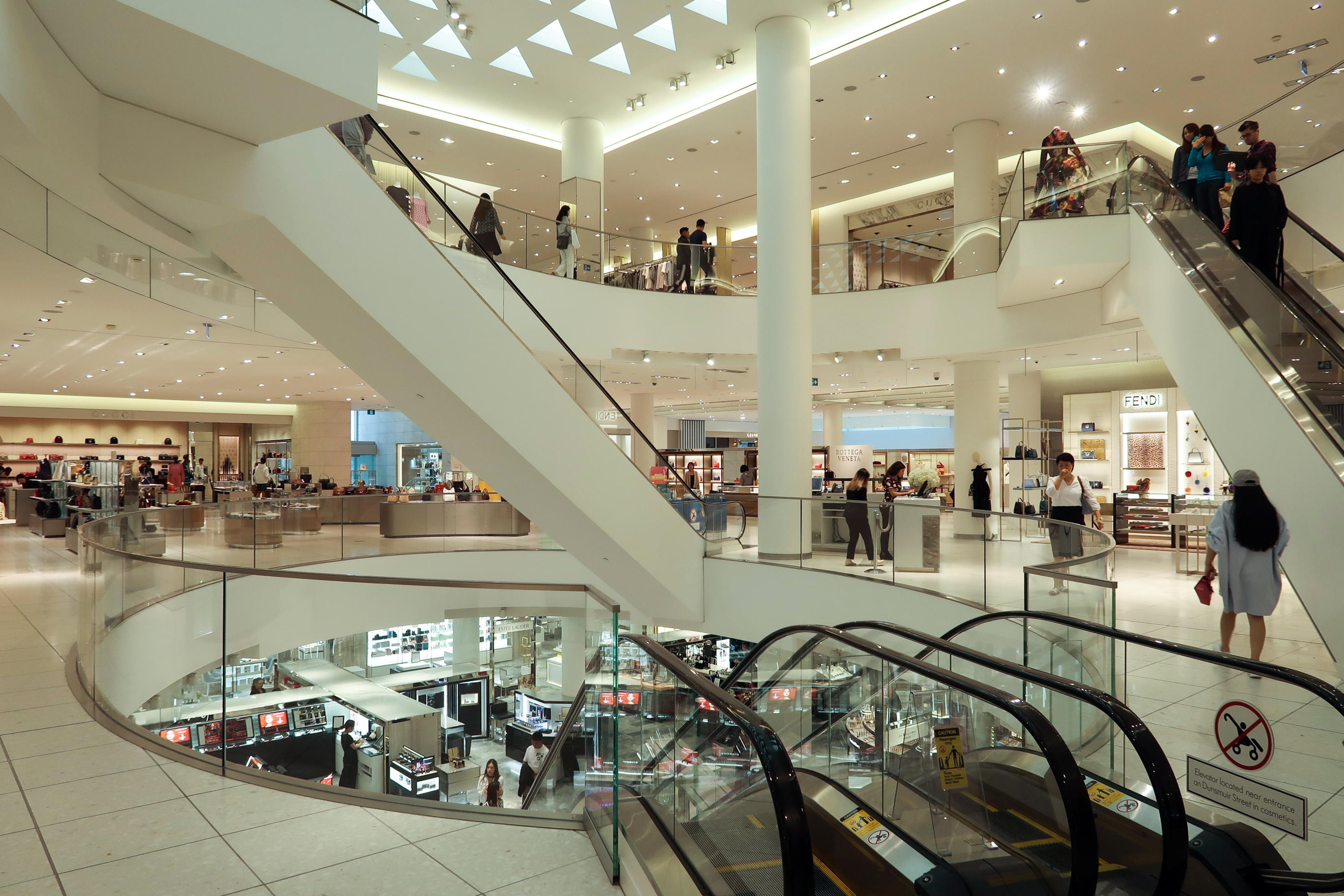
Interior of the Holt Renfrew at Dunsmuir Street in Vancouver in 2018

More than three decades after opening its first Vancouver outlet, Holt Renfrew unveiled a new store at 737 Dunsmuir Street in June 2007. Described by one design critic as a "glossy monument to high-end chic the store featured a pillowed glass exterior and a three-storey atrium. At 110,000 square feet (10,000 m^{2}), the new space represented more than double the retail square footage of the old store at 633 Granville Street, located at the opposite end of the Pacific Centre. Two years later, a new Calgary store was officially unveiled. Both retail spaces were the design work of the New York City firm of Janson Goldstein.

=== 2010–present ===
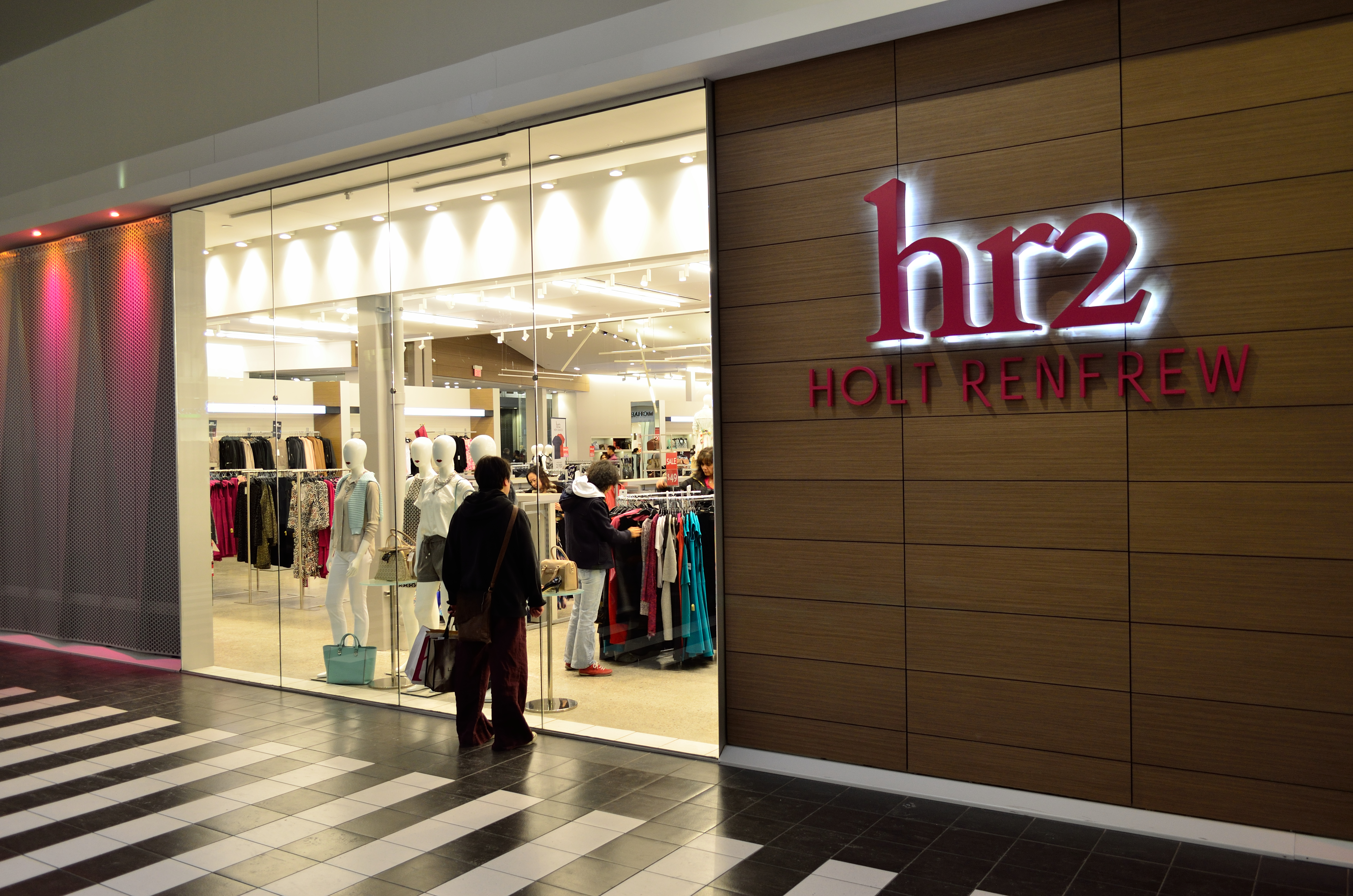
An hr2 at Vaughan Mills. The chain was a new initiative from the company.

In 2010, Canadian retail executive Mark Derbyshire replaced Caryn Lerner as president. Derbyshire expressed his desire to do more to appeal to the men's segment of the fashion market.

In 2012, Holt Renfrew marked its 175th anniversary with a series of major events across the country. Birthday celebrations were capped off with the release of limited edition HR175 designer merchandise and a large street party at its Bloor Street West store. In 2013, the company announced a new retail initiative called "hr2," a chain of outlets focused on mid-priced designer merchandise and luxury goods. The hr2 stores were closed in 2017.

== Retail formats ==
=== Full-line stores ===
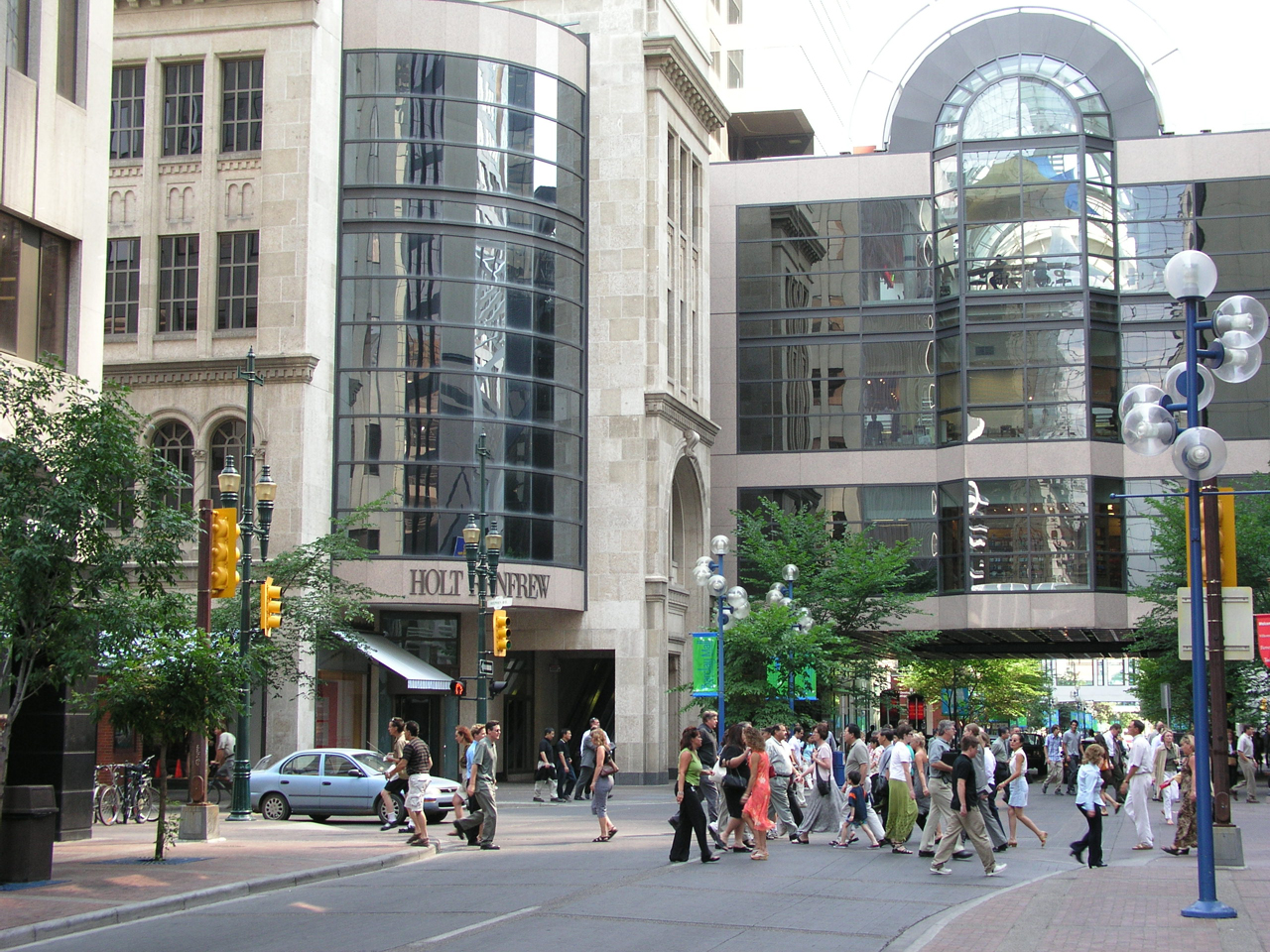
Exterior entrance to Holt Renfrew at The Core in Calgary

Holt Renfrew also has contributed to promote new brands, such as Greta Constantine, designed by Kirk Pickersgill and Stephen Wong.

In October 2014, the company opened a 16,500-square-foot (1,530 m^{2}) menswear-only location called Holt Renfrew Men at 100 Bloor St W, next to the 55,000-square-foot (5,100 m^{2}) Harry Rosen Inc. flagship store, to complement the existing Holt Renfrew flagship store at 50 Bloor St W.

In July 2016, the company opened a 130,000-square-foot (12,000 m^{2}) location at Square One Shopping Center in Mississauga, Ontario, while a smaller Sherway Gardens location nearby closed the same month.

The closure of the Ottawa and Quebec City stores was announced in August 2014.

List of Holt Renfrew stores
Province	City	Shopping center or district	Size	Year opened	Year closed	Notes
Alberta	Calgary	The Core	147,000 sq ft (13,700 m^{2})	2009	—N/a	
Alberta	Edmonton	Manulife Place	47,000 sq ft (4,400 m^{2})	1950	2020	
British Columbia	Vancouver	Pacific Centre	68,000 sq ft (6,300 m^{2})	1975	2007	
British Columbia	Vancouver	Pacific Centre	190,000 sq ft (18,000 m^{2})	2007	—N/a	
Manitoba	Winnipeg	Portage Place	2,990 sq ft (278 m^{2})	1982	2015	
Ontario	Mississauga	Square One Shopping Centre	130,000 sq ft (12,000 m^{2})	2016	—N/a	
Ontario	Ottawa	C.D. Howe Building	36,000 sq ft (3,300 m^{2})	1945	2015	
Ontario	Toronto	Holt Renfrew Centre	180,000 sq ft (17,000 m^{2})	1979	—N/a	Flagship store
Ontario	Toronto	Bloor Street West	16,500 sq ft (1,530 m^{2})	2014	2024	Men's store; re-combined with Toronto flagship store in 2024
Ontario	Toronto	Sherway Gardens	33,670 sq ft (3,128 m^{2})	1971	2016	Moved to Square One
Ontario	Toronto	Yorkdale Shopping Centre	120,000 sq ft (11,000 m^{2})	1964	—N/a	
Ontario	Vaughan	Vaughan Mills	26,000 sq ft (2,400 m^{2})		2017	original Holt Renfrew Last Call store, later hr2
Quebec	Brossard	Quartier Dix30	30,000 sq ft (2,800 m^{2})	2013	2017	hr2 store
Quebec	Montreal	Sherbrooke Street	84,000 sq ft (7,800 m^{2})	1937	2020	Moved to Sainte-Catherine West
Quebec	Montreal	Sainte-Catherine Street West	250,000 sq ft (23,000 m^{2})	2019	—N/a	Co-branded with Ogilvy and renamed Holt Renfrew Ogilvy
Quebec	Mount Royal	Rockland Centre	21,000 sq ft (2,000 m^{2})	1959	2003	
Quebec	Quebec City	Place Sainte-Foy	33,000 sq ft (3,100 m^{2})	1965	2015	

==== Holts Café ====
The Bloor Street, Yorkdale, Montreal, and Vancouver locations include Holts Café, an informal diner-like restaurant concept, that features tartine made from Poilane bread that is flown in directly from Paris, France. The 80-seat Vancouver location was designed by Yabu Pushelberg. Holts Cafés long planned for Square One and Calgary have not materialized.

=== Defunct formats ===
Other recent closures include the "Last Call" end-of-the-line store at Vaughan Mills in Vaughan, Ontario, and the Last Call outlet in Winnipeg. The remaining Holt Renfrew personal shopping suites and a cosmetics outlet in Winnipeg closed in 2015. The Edmonton store which had been in the podium of Manulife Place since 1982 closed on January 11, 2020, ending the chain's 70 years of continuous operation in the city. This is as the company has been focusing on larger stores with 130,000 square feet (12,000 m^{2}) or more.

== See also ==
- List of Canadian department stores
- Retail apocalypse
