= 2 Bloor East =

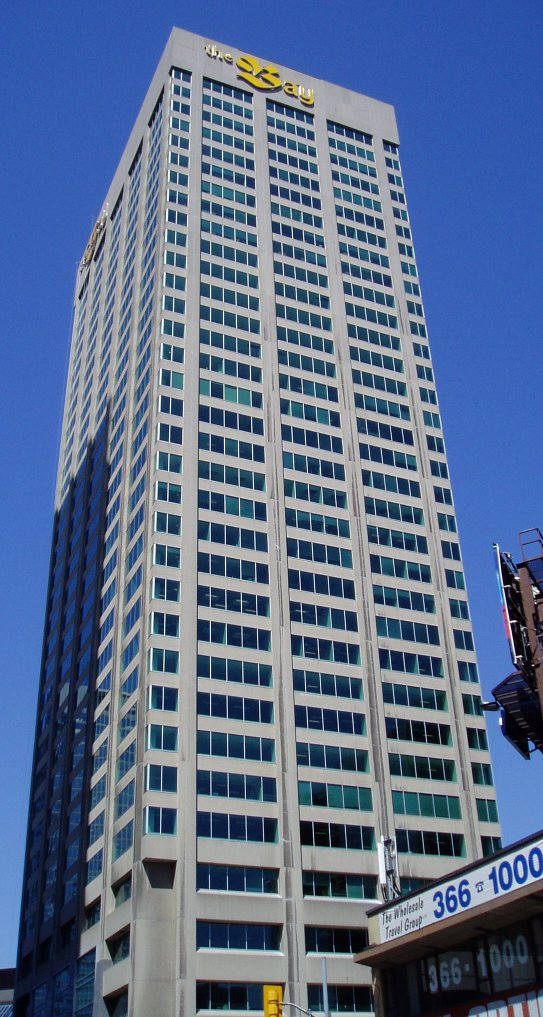
- Exterior of 2 Bloor East, April 2005
- Interactive map of the 2 Bloor East area
- Former names: Hudson's Bay Centre

General information
- Location: 2 Bloor Street East; Toronto, Ontario; M4W 1A8
- Coordinates: 43.670724°N 79.386606°W
- Construction started: 1972
- Completed: 1974

Height
- Roof: 135 m (443 ft)

Technical details
- Floor count: 35
- Floor area: 535,000 sq ft (49,700 m^{2})

Design and construction
- Architecture firm: Crang & Boake

2 Bloor East (formerly the Hudson's Bay Centre) is an office and retail complex at the intersection of Bloor Street and Yonge Street in downtown Toronto, Ontario, Canada, at the east end of the Mink Mile. Brookfield Properties owns and operates the centre. The centre is composed of a 35-storey office tower and a retail concourse. From its opening in 1974 until 2022 it had a Hudson's Bay department store as its anchor store.

== Description ==
The tower stands at 135 metres in height. It contains 35 floors and 535,000-square-foot (49,700 m^{2}), and its address 2 Bloor Street East, at the northeast corner of the intersection of Yonge and Bloor Streets. The extensive retail concourse was anchored by a flagship store of Hudson's Bay/The Bay (known as the "Toronto, on Bloor Street" store at 44 Bloor Street East, the main brand of HBC. The mall contains over 45 specialty shops, boutiques, services and eateries.

The complex includes a hotel tower, opened in 1976 as the Hotel Plaza II, a sister hotel of the nearby Park Plaza Hotel. The hotel suffered a deadly fire in 1982. It was later renamed the Toronto Marriott Bloor Yorkville Hotel. It closed in 2019 for major renovations and reopened in 2022 as the W Toronto Hotel.

The complex also has an RBC Royal Bank branch, a Jack Astor's Bar and Grill, apartments, and condominiums.

The centre has space for 1,200 cars in its underground and above-ground parking lots, multiple entrances located on Yonge, Bloor Streets, Park Road and Asquith Avenue and is surrounded by several parks and the Yorkville neighborhood which is known for upscale shopping.

The building is connected to the Bloor–Yonge subway station, the TTC's major east-west/north-south transfer point. There are also below-grade connections to the Holt Renfrew Centre and Cumberland Terrace, which continues westward to 60 Bloor Street West and Manulife Centre. The pedestrian tunnels stretch along Bloor Street West to the Bay subway station, making this Toronto's largest underground network after PATH.

== History ==
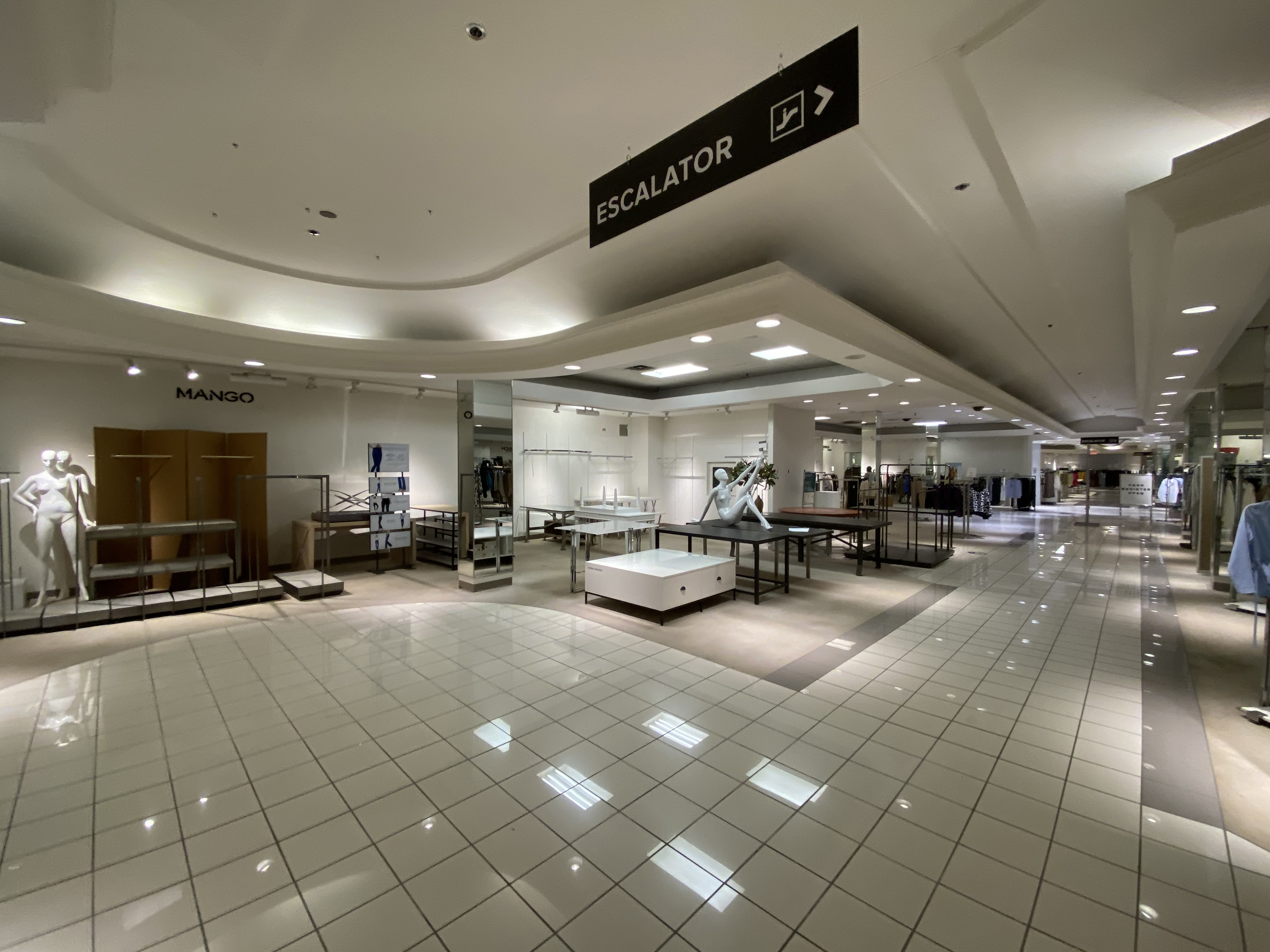
Yonge and Bloor department store before closure in March 2022

Plans for the project were announced in 1969 by Berhold Investments Limited, a Swiss development company. Berhold had acquired the property from Canadian Interurban Properties Limited and Dollar Land Corporation Limited. Berhold was an affiliate of Fidinam Ontario Limited, the Canadian subsidiary of Fidinam of Lugano, Switzerland. Fidinam served as a consultant on the project.

In December 1971, Fidinam announced that the Hudson's Bay Company had signed as the major tenant of the office tower. The other main tenant in the office would be the Workmen's Compensation Board of Ontario.

Completed in 1974, the International style office skyscraper has served as the headquarters for the retailer Hudson's Bay Company (HBC). The company remained the main tenant until 2022, although the company relocated its head office to the Simpson Tower in 1978. The department store opened with the tower and was the first location of The Bay within the former city of Toronto. It overtook the Winnipeg location to become the flagship branch of The Bay (despite being actually smaller in size than the former) and maintained this distinction until the conversion in 1991 of the larger Simpsons store also located in Toronto.

In 2013, it was announced that the 342,000 square feet (31,800 m^{2}) Hudson's Bay/The Bay store could undergo a CA$100 million renovation to become the Canadian flagship location of Saks Fifth Avenue, the American luxury department store chain which is now also owned by Hudson's Bay Company (HBC). However, it was subsequently announced that HBC would instead be renovating its flagship Hudson's Bay store at Yonge and Queen to include a 150,000 square foot Saks Fifth Avenue, and would leave the Yonge and Bloor location as a Hudson's Bay store.

In August 2014, the centre became the subject of controversy when its property manager, Brookfield Properties Ltd, admitted to regularly confiscating bicycles that were locked to a pole on a municipal right of way on Bloor St. outside of the mall. The City of Toronto assigned by-law officers to investigate.

In 2021, the iconic "The Bay" signage that was displayed on top of the office tower for nearly 50 years was removed. The following year, the Hudson's Bay Company announced that the Yonge and Bloor department store would close at the end of May 2022, and the site is expected to be redeveloped in conjunction with a major overhaul of the Bloor–Yonge TTC station. The store finally closed on May 13, 2022.

By April 2026, Brookfield Properties and Larco Investments proposed converting several floors of the former Hudson's Bay store into a storage warehouse. Urban Strategies Inc. submitted a zoning application to the City of Toronto to permit such a conversion. The self-storage space would occupy 20,100 square metres (216,000 sq ft) on the second through to the fifth levels of the building. The ground and concourse levels would contain 8,330 square metres (89,700 sq ft) of retail space. The proposal also sought permission to alter the concrete building façade for esthetic reasons.

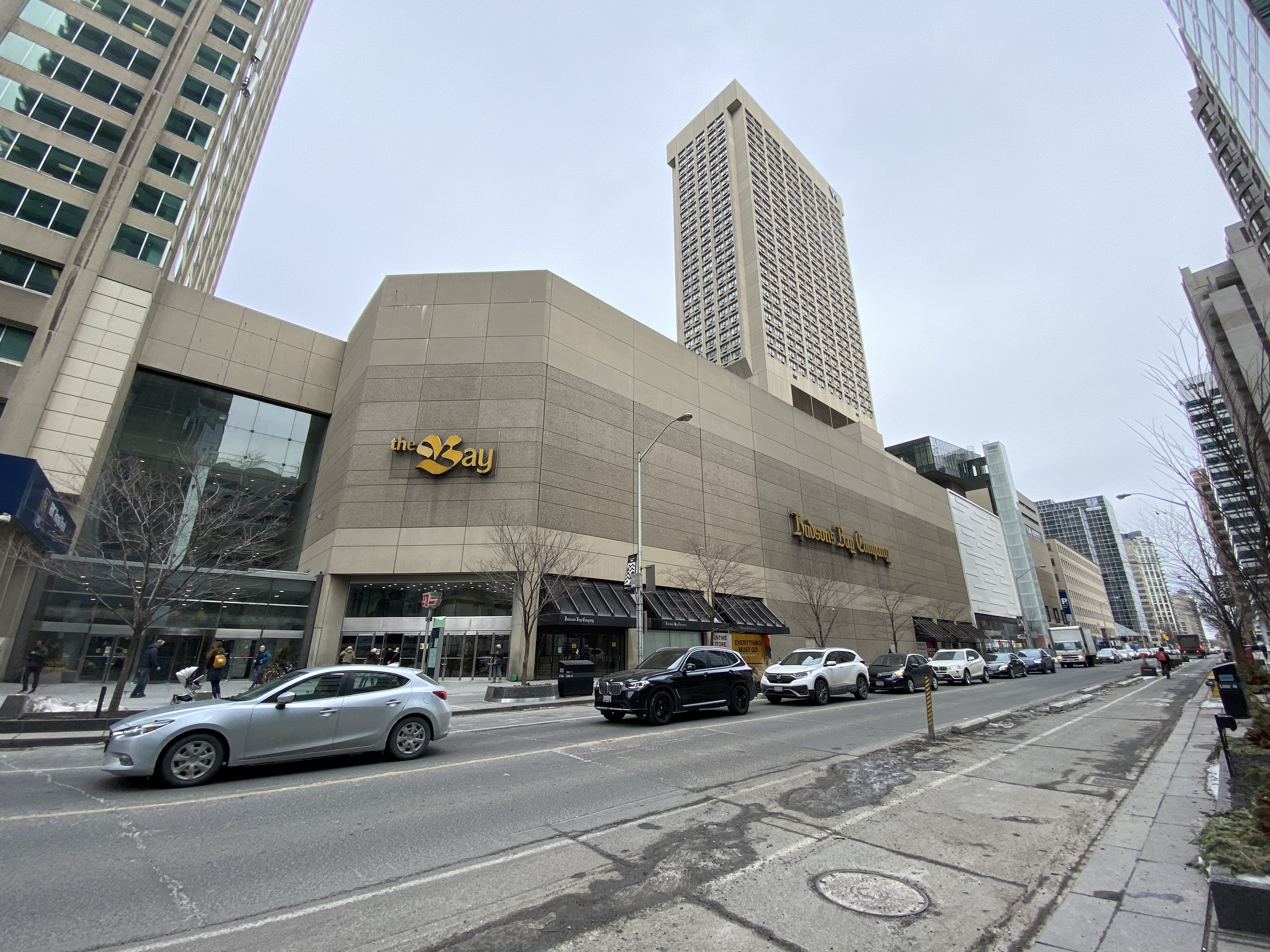
Facade of the department store, with W Toronto Hotel towering behind it

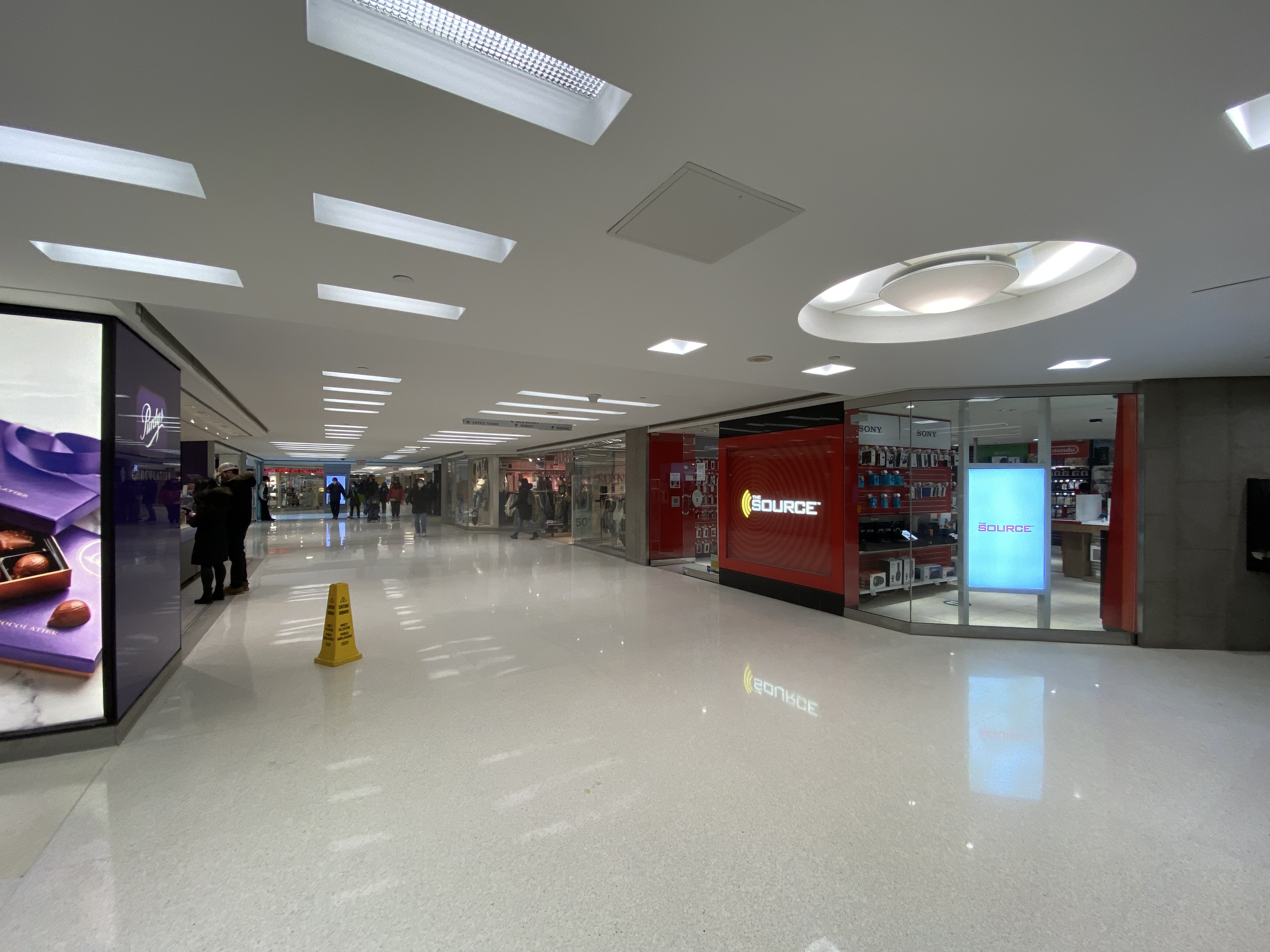
Concourse Level shops

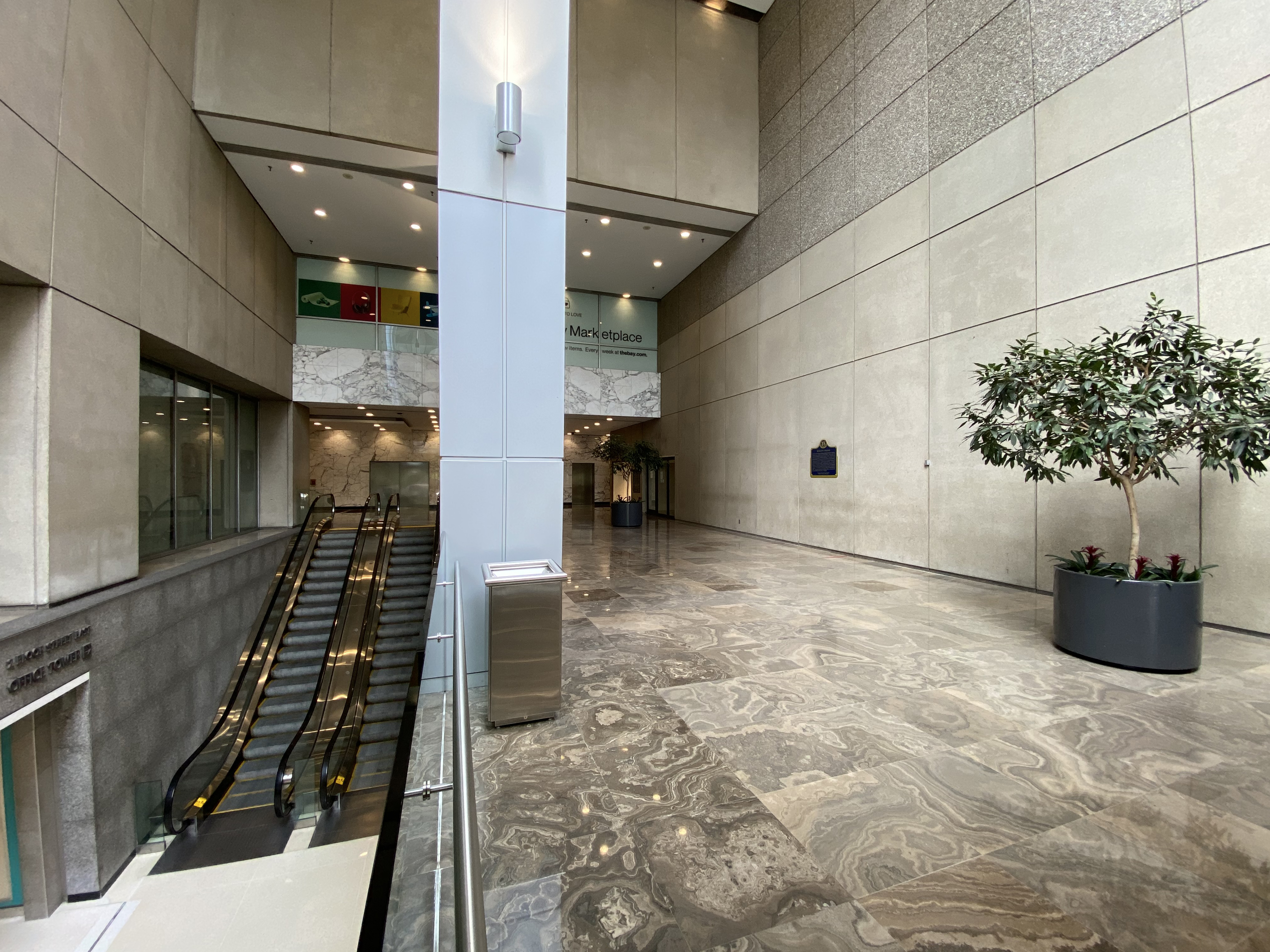
Office lobby

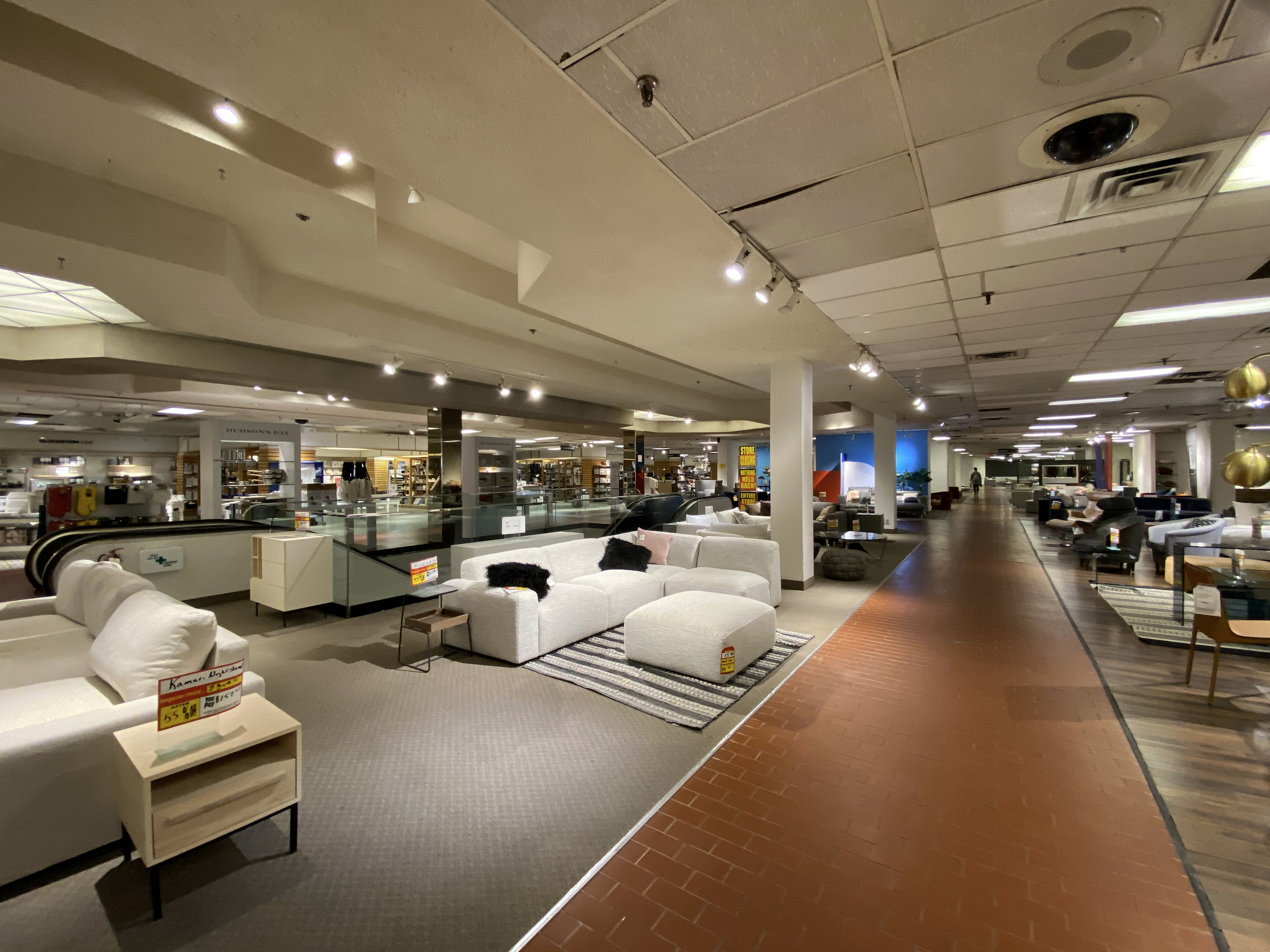
Yonge and Bloor department store Level 5

== See also ==
- 2 Bloor West
- One Bloor West
- 1 Bloor East
