= Nolin =

Nolin may refer to:

== Surname ==
- Charles Nolin (1837–1907), Métis farmer and political organiser, opposing the North-West Rebellion of 1885
- Gena Lee Nolin (born 1971), American actress and model
- Jean-Baptiste Nolin (c.1657–1708), French cartographer and engraver
- Joseph Nolin (1866–1925), Canadian provincial politician
- Marie-Paule Nolin (1908–1987), French Canadian high-fashion designer
- Michael Nolin, American motion picture producer, studio executive, writer/director and educator
- Pierre Claude Nolin (1950–2015), Canadian politician and Senator
- Rebecca Nolin (born 1983), English professional soccer player
- Sean Nolin (born 1989), American professional baseball pitcher

== Places ==
- Nolin, Oregon, unincorporated community in Umatilla County, Oregon, United States
- Nolin Lake State Park, park located in Edmonson County, Kentucky, United States
- Nolin River, tributary of the Green River, 105 mi (169 km) long, in central Kentucky in the United States
- Nolin River Lake, reservoir in Edmonson, Grayson, and Hart counties in Kentucky
