= Bloor–Yonge station =

Toronto subway station

Bloor–Yonge
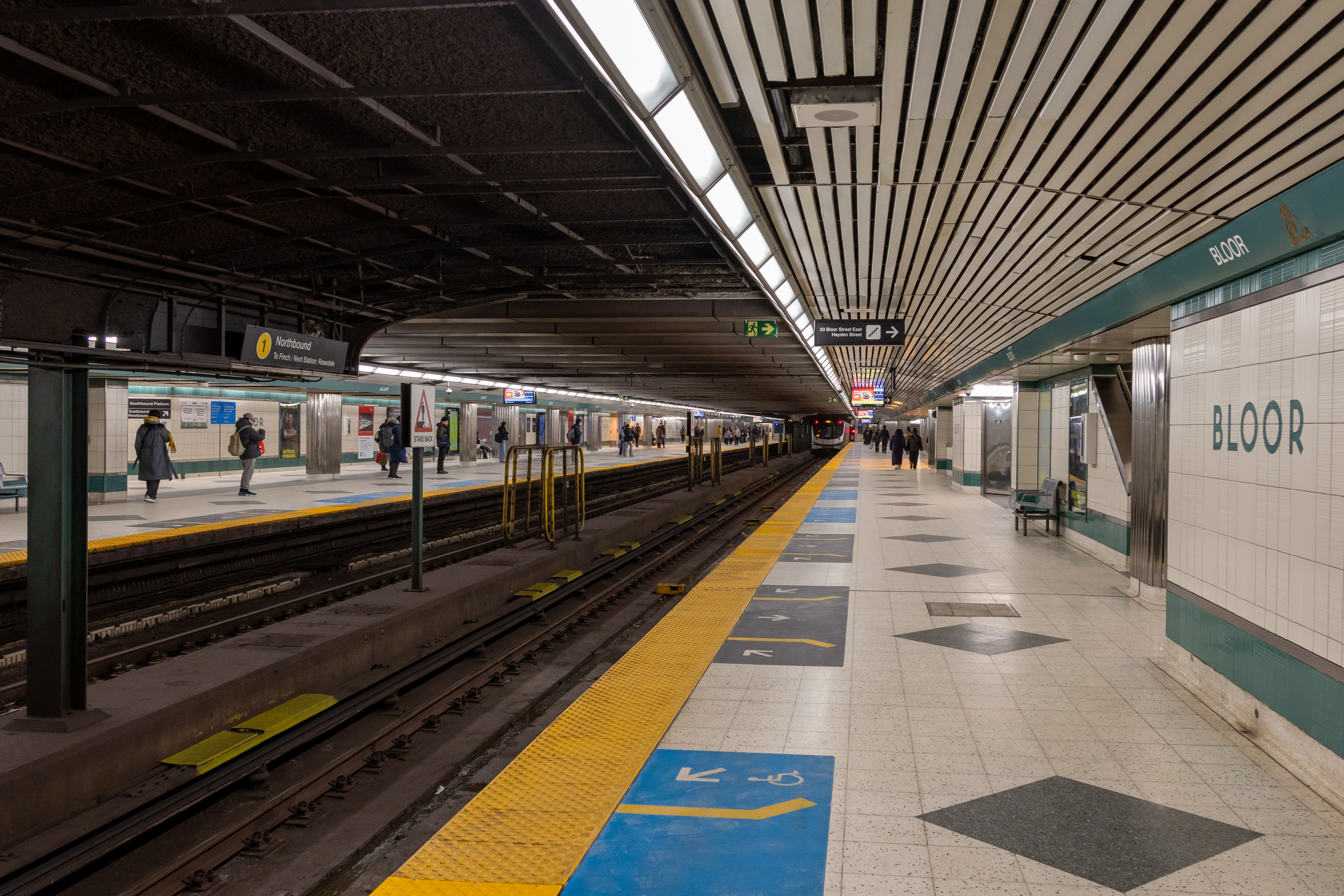
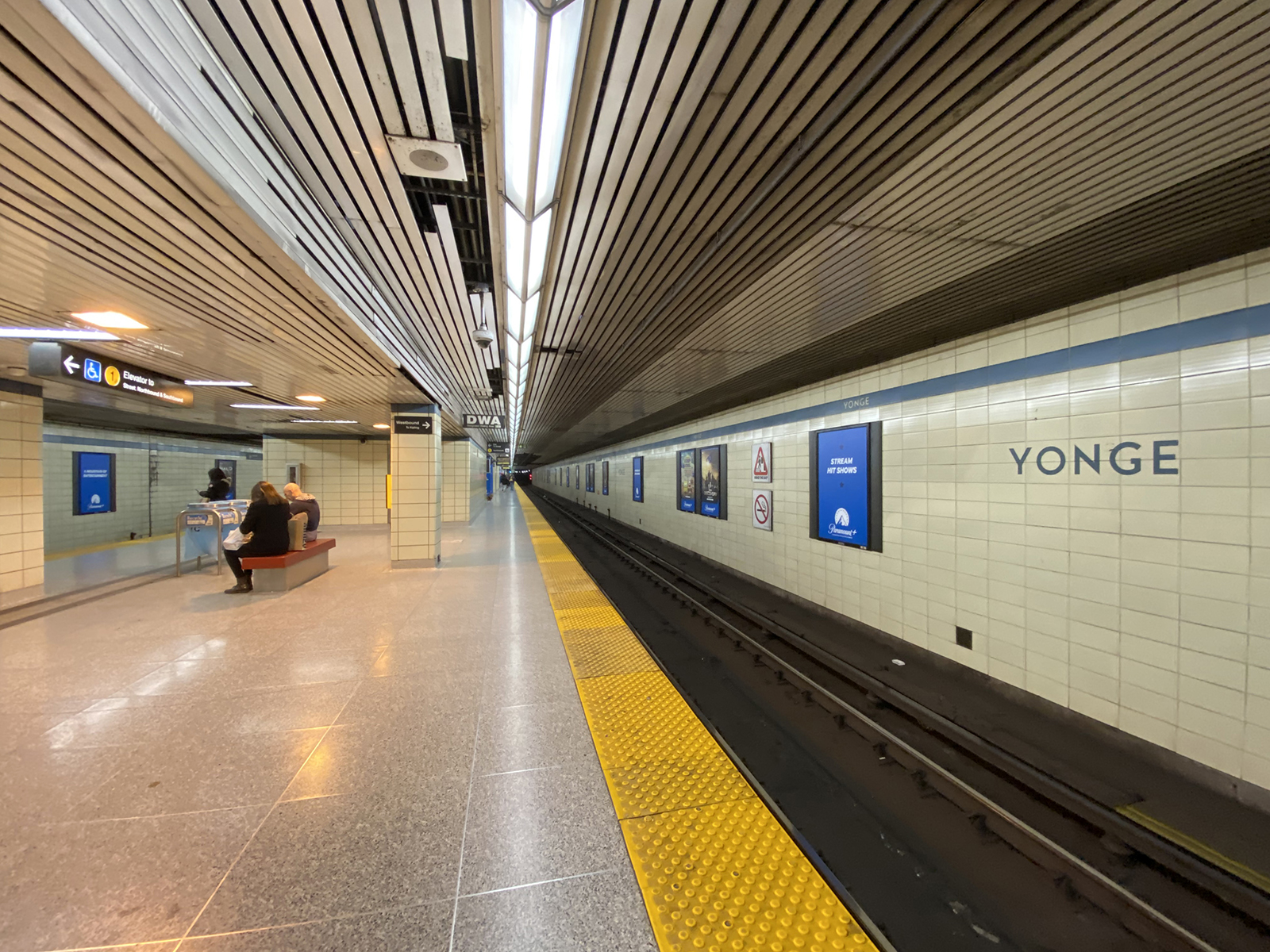
- Line 1 platform Line 2 platform

General information
- Location: 20 Bloor Street East, Toronto, Ontario; Canada
- Coordinates: 43°40′15″N 79°23′08″W
- Owner: Toronto Transit Commission
- Platforms: Side platforms (Line 1); Centre platform (Line 2)
- Tracks: 4 (2 on each level)
- Connections: TTC buses: 97 Yonge; 300 Bloor-Danforth; 320 Yonge

Construction
- Structure type: Underground
- Platform levels: 2
- Accessible: Yes
- Architect: Charles B. Dolphin

Other information
- Website: Official station page

History
- Opened: Line 1: March 30, 1954; 72 years ago; Line 2: February 26, 1966; 60 years ago

Passengers
- 2023–2024: 156,653 (Line 1); 121,531 (Line 2); 278,184 total (Note: Figure derived from adding the ridership of Bloor and Yonge platforms; therefore a passenger transferring from Bloor to Yonge or vice versa will be counted twice.)
- Rank: 1 of 70

Services
Preceding station	Toronto Transit Commission	Following station
Wellesley towards Vaughan	Line 1 Yonge–University	Rosedale towards Finch
Bay towards Kipling	Line 2 Bloor–Danforth	Sherbourne towards Kennedy
Track layout
Location

Bloor–Yonge is a subway station on Line 1 Yonge–University and Line 2 Bloor–Danforth in Toronto, Ontario, Canada. Located in Downtown Toronto, under the intersection of Yonge Street and Bloor Street, it is the busiest subway station in the system, handling over 200,000 passengers on an average weekday.

== History ==
The station was opened in 1954 and designed by Charles B. Dolphin. It was originally named Bloor and connected with a pair of enclosed platforms in the centre of Bloor Street to allow interchange with Bloor streetcars within the fare-paid zone. When the streetcars were replaced by the Bloor–Danforth subway (now Line 2 Bloor–Danforth) in 1966, the station began to be shown on maps as Bloor–Yonge. However, actual platform signs still show Bloor on Line 1 Yonge–University and Yonge on the Bloor–Danforth line, following a naming style common in New York subway station complexes, where only the platform's cross street is shown on the platform signs.

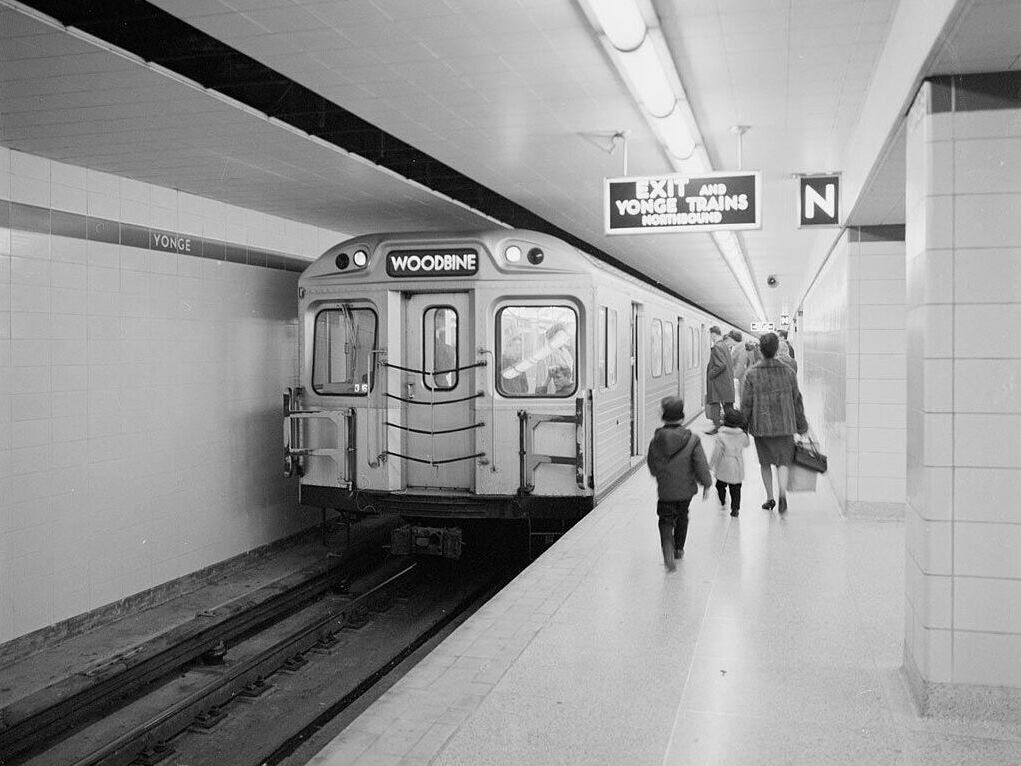
Passengers board a subway train at Yonge station, 1966

Similarly, the automated station announcement system installed on trains from 2007 to 2008 refers to the station as Bloor on Line 1 and Yonge on Line 2 respectively. The announcements on the Toronto Rocket subway trains that have operated on Line 1 since 2011 refer to the station as Bloor–Yonge along with announcing "transfer for Line 2 Bloor–Danforth" (as of December 2025). It is the only TTC station named in this way; all other interchanges share the same name for both lines; i.e. Sheppard–Yonge.

The station used to feature a small retail concourse along the corridor leading from the entrance at the south side of Bloor Street. This concourse was closed and disappeared during the construction of the office building at 33 Bloor Street East in the late 1980s.

Due to its congestion, the TTC has had to expand the station. In 1992, it took advantage of building construction over the Yonge–University portion of the station to open it out and widen the platforms.

In 1996, the station became accessible with elevators as one of the TTC's first accessible stations.

The TTC experimented with crowd-control measures on the southbound platform of the Yonge–University level on November 24, 2009, and made these permanent as they allowed for improved passenger flow by discouraging crowding near the stairs leading to the Bloor–Danforth level. These measures also reduced dwell times by a few seconds, such that a few more trains can enter the station during rush hour without building additional capacity.

Increasing ridership has led to overcrowding of the station and discussion of a potential Relief Line. The TTC took various crowd-control measures during peak periods; empty trains were often dispatched to the station to clear the platform. Signal upgrades and other improvements on Line 1 have relieved the station and line of some crowding, but a study conducted by Metrolinx concluded that the benefits would only last until 2031.

As of March 2014, a trial for new numerical signage referring to the subway routes such as Line 1 for the Yonge line and Line 2 for the Bloor line were phased in on signs and maps at the station.

In April 2019, as a 6-month trial project, the TTC installed floor decals along platform edges to direct rush-hour crowds boarding trains. The decals, located near where the train doors open, indicate where passengers on the platform should stand in order not to block passengers leaving the train. The decals have two background colours – grey and blue – where the blue decals (with a wheelchair symbol) indicate where passengers with mobility problems should board. The blue decals are installed near platform elevators. Such decals have already been successfully used at York University station.

== Subway infrastructure in the vicinity ==
North of the station the Yonge–University line crosses under Church Street in a tunnel then emerges to the surface at the Ellis Portal, continuing in an open cut through Rosedale Station. South to Wellesley Station, the line was constructed by cut-and-cover, with the surface areas now occupied by a Toronto Parking Authority multi-storey garage at Charles Street and three parks maintained by the City of Toronto – George Hislop Park, Norman Jewison Park, and James Canning Gardens south of that.

The east–west Bloor–Danforth centre platform was constructed under the existing north–south Yonge–University side platforms, and is fully accessible by elevator.

Between Yonge and Sherbourne Station to the east, the Bloor–Danforth line crosses to the south side of Bloor Street in a 2,250 feet (690 m) long section of bored tunnel, rather than the shallow cut-and-cover method used to construct most of the line. Cumberland Terrace, a two-storey shopping centre, has been built over the right of way west of Yonge Street to Bay Street.

== Entrances ==
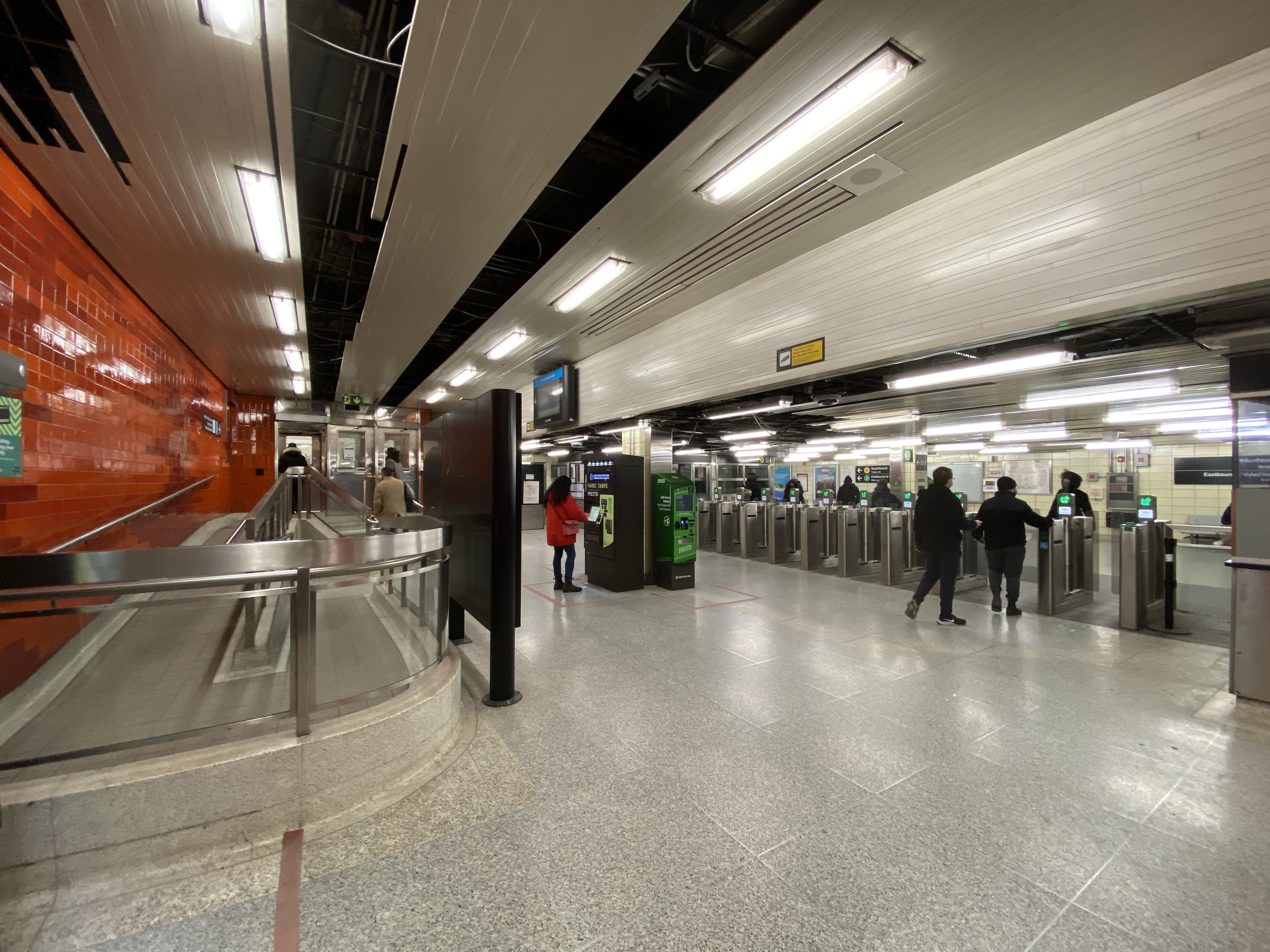
Bloor–Yonge station concourse at Hudson's Bay Centre

There are six entrances to Bloor–Yonge station. The main entrances along with the fare collector booth and elevators are located at the northeast side via the Hudson's Bay Centre and at the southeast side via the Xerox building. There is also an unstaffed automatic entrance at the northeast corner which leads directly to the Line 2 platform and is accessible only to Presto card holders since January 2018. All entrances are located near the intersection of Bloor and Yonge streets.

== Nearby landmarks ==
Nearby landmarks include the Toronto Reference Library, the Hudson's Bay Centre, and 2 Bloor Street West.

== Future expansion ==
Since April 2019, the TTC has been proposing a major upgrade to Bloor–Yonge station, including adding a second Line 2 platform similar to the platform added at Union station in 2014. The project is mainly to address platform crowding. At that time, the estimated cost was CA$1.1 billion. By October 2020, the project cost had risen to $1.5 billion and had a target completion of 2029. The project includes:

- A new Line 2 platform for eastbound traffic and conversion of the existing centre platform for westbound traffic only
- Extension and widening of both Line 1 platforms at the north end
- A new substation
- Five new fan plants
- A new station entrance
- Platform screen doors

== Surface connections ==
Transfers to buses occur at curbside stops located at Bloor Street and Yonge Street outside the station. TTC routes serving the station include:

Route	Name	Additional information
97C	Yonge	Northbound to Eglinton station and southbound to Union station
300A	Bloor–Danforth	Blue Night service; westbound to Pearson Airport and eastbound to Warden Avenue
300B	Bloor–Danforth	Blue Night service; westbound to West Mall and eastbound to Kennedy station
320	Yonge	Blue Night service; northbound to Steeles Avenue and southbound to Queens Quay
