= Marie-Paule Nolin =

Canadian fashion designer (1908–1987)

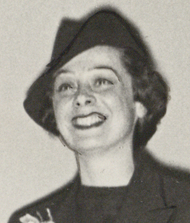
- Born: 9 July 1908; Saint-Hyacinthe
- Died: 15 October 1987 (aged 79); Montreal
- Occupation: Fashion designer

Marie-Paule Nolin (née Archambault; 1908 in Saint-Hyacinthe – 1987 in Montreal) was a French Canadian high-fashion designer who lived and worked in the province of Quebec, Canada.

Marie-Paule Archambault started out as a vendeuse for Raoul-Jean Fouré who had launched his fashion house in Montreal in about 1927. At the age of 26, she launched a dressmaking business on what would become the De Maisonneuve Boulevard. She received publicity early on through her participation in a charity fashion show at the Windsor Hotel, and after a trip to Paris where she visited several fashion salons, she came back to launch her own fashion salon at 648 Sherbrooke Street West, Montreal in 1936. From 1941–1949, she ran a couture workroom, employing about twenty workers, in the department store Holt Renfrew from Montréal, where her creations could be purchased from the Salon Marie-Paule.

Marie-Paule married Jean Nolin in 1949, and they had two daughters, Patricia and Marie-Claire.

From 1949 to 1955 Marie-Paule worked from home, until in 1955 she relocated her business to an office at 1426 Sherbrooke Street, operating as 'Marie-Paule Haute Couture'. The following year she became President of the Association of Canadian Couturiers (ACC), whose purpose was to promote Canadian high fashion design. Along with Fouré (the ACC's first President), other founding members included Colpron d'Anjou, Marcel Martel, Jacques de Montejoye, and Federica of Toronto.

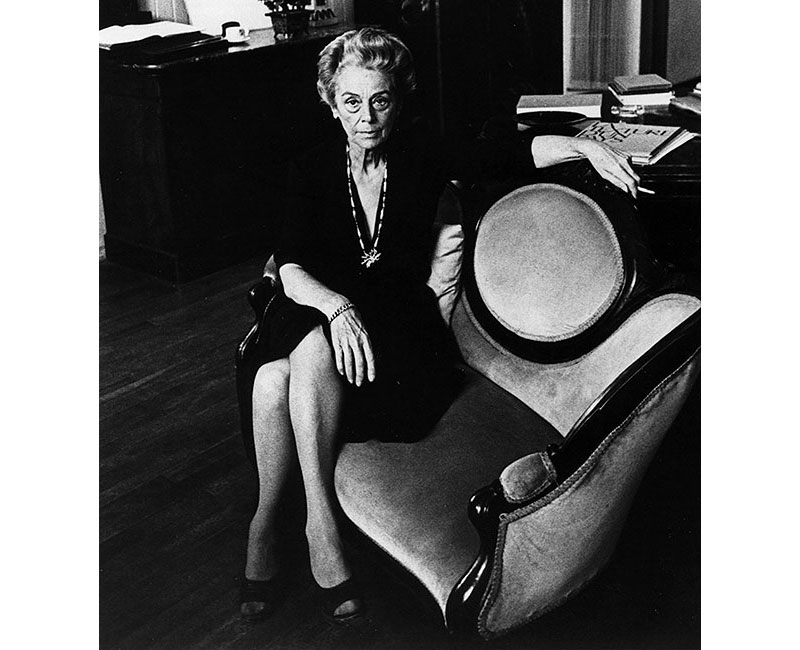

From 1959 to 1965, she was part of the crew of the weekly radio program Femina at the Canadian Broadcasting Corporation in Montreal, informing the audience about design and its philosophical and historical background and development. In 1962, Nolin lost a lot of her work in a house fire, and subsequently relocated to 420 Bonsecours Street. In 1969 she launched a ready-to-wear line, although her refusal to compromise by using cheaper fabrics led to the failure of the venture.

Marie-Paule Nolin retired in 1974, and closed her business, which was the last couture establishment in Montreal.

In 1984, a major retrospective of her work was presented by the McCord Museum in Montreal. The Museum also manages the Marie-Paule Nolin Study Award, an academic award whose aim is to support fashion and textile research projects which make specific use of the McCord's collections.
