= Mink Mile =

Upscale fashion district in Toronto

Coordinates: 43.6696°N 79.3902°W

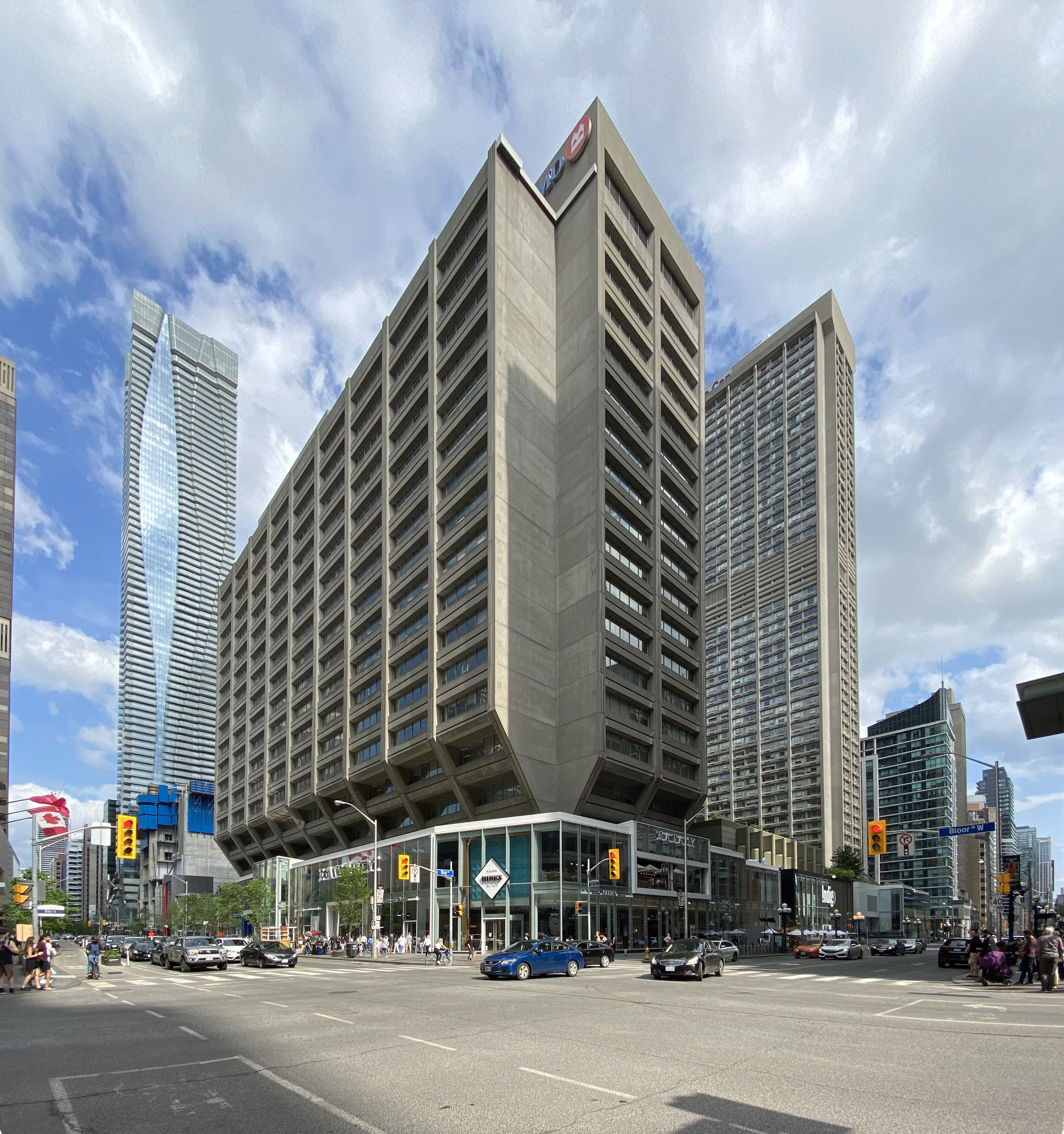
The intersection of Bloor Street and Bay Street, near the centre of Mink Mile.

Mink Mile is an upscale shopping district in the neighbourhood of Yorkville in Toronto, Ontario, Canada, along Bloor Street between Yonge Street and Avenue Road.

== History ==
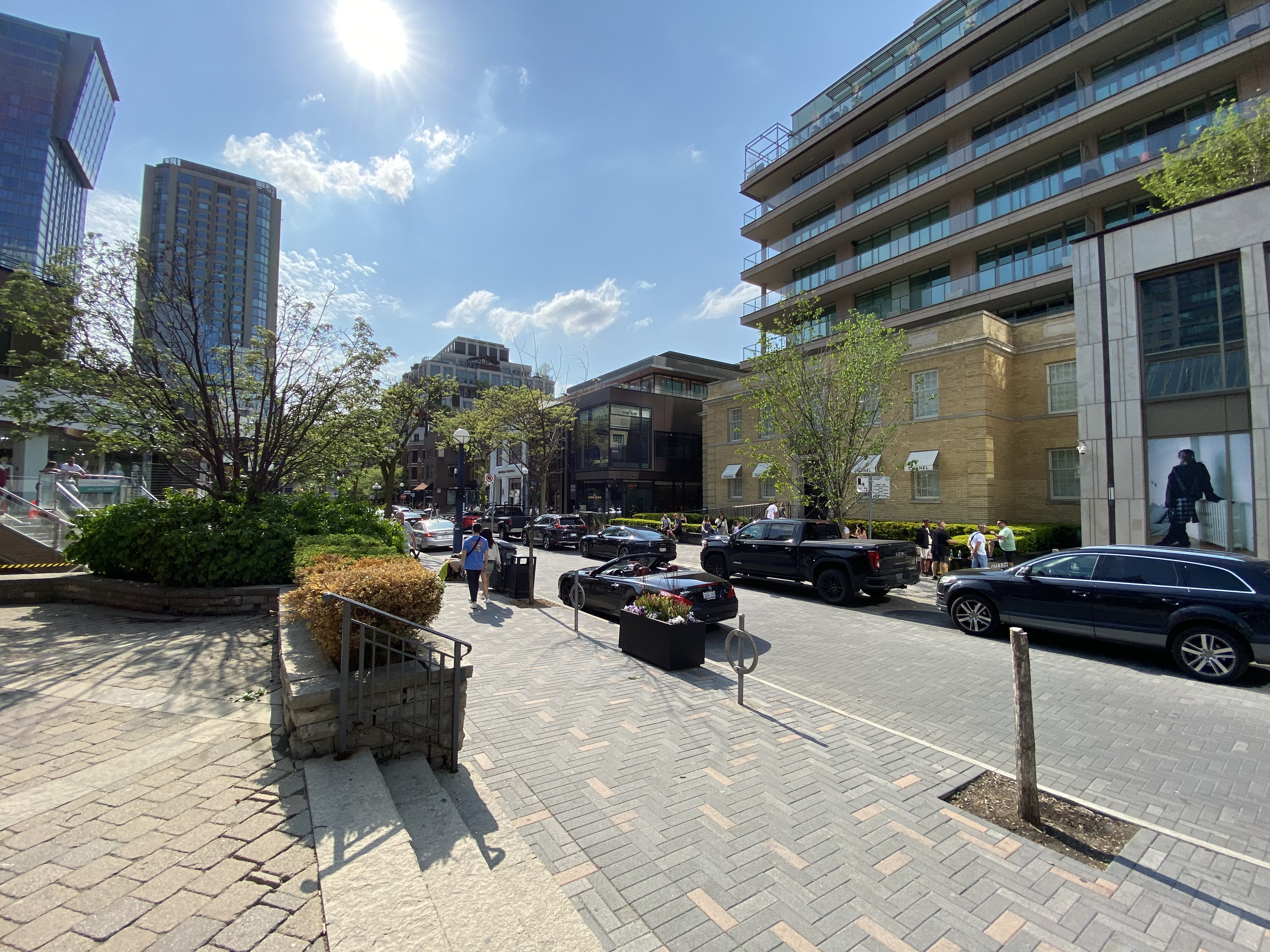
Shops on Yorkville Avenue

In the 21st century, mid-market retailers have begun to locate along the Mink Mile. In 2005, Winners and La Senza opened stores, later followed by Club Monaco, J. Crew, Banana Republic, French Connection, Puma, Aldo, Aritzia, American Apparel, Roots Canada Ltd, Guess, Nike, Zara, Roots, Lululemon, Sephora, Gap, and H&M. Discount retailer, Labels 4 Less, opened their own store in 2008, to the disappointment of many of its neighbours but was replaced shortly by Hugo Boss.

Begun in 2008, the Bloor-Yorkville Business Improvement Area and the City of Toronto updated the streetscape from Church Street to Avenue Road, creating an enhanced pedestrian experience with widened sidewalks, mature trees, flower gardens, modern lighting, and public art. The project was completed in 2013.

== Retail ==
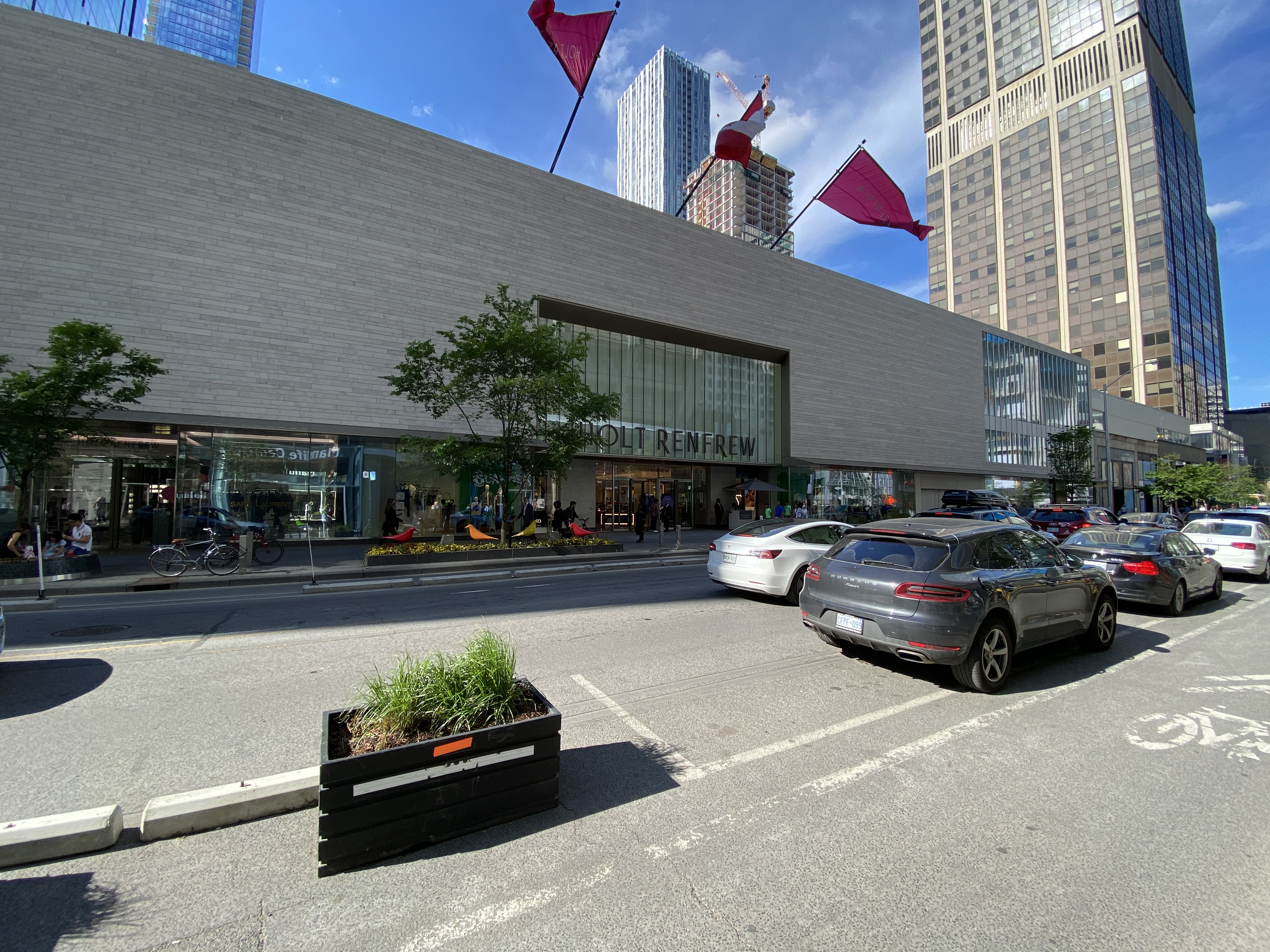
The Holt Renfrew Centre at Mink Mile.

Mink Mile has been recognized as one of the most luxurious shopping streets in North America, being compared to New York's Fifth Avenue, Chicago's Magnificent Mile, and Los Angeles' Rodeo Drive. Demand remained high on Mink Mile, according to real estate firm, Cushman and Wakefield. In 2005, retail space rents were $110 per square foot. The 2010 Cushman and Wakefield report indicate rents of $198 per square foot, while the Q407 Toronto Retail Report in 2010 mentions deals reaching $300 per square foot, making Mink Mile the third most expensive retail street in North America. This has led to higher rents on nearby Cumberland St. and Yorkville Ave., with several new developments asking $125 per square foot. Expensive Indian fashion boutique INDIVA, which moved to a smaller boutique on Yorkville Ave., claims that the monthly rent at their previous location was $85,000.

Many independent retailers struggle to meet these demands, and many in past years have closed or relocated to other streets. However, it is estimated that some retailers pull in more than $2,000 per square foot in sales. In 2008, the stretch of Bloor was named the seventh most expensive shopping street in the world by Fortune Magazine, claiming tenants can make $1,500 to $4,500 per square foot in sales. In 2012, Mink Mile commands an average rent of $310 per square foot, making it the most expensive place in Canada to lease retail space and the third most expensive retail space in North America.

Several retailers have shops in the area including Hermès, Louis Vuitton, Dior, Gucci, Prada, Chanel, Cartier, Burberry, Dolce & Gabbana, Escada, MCM, Versace, Brunello Cucinelli, Christian Louboutin, Tiffany & Co., Coach, Saint Laurent, and department stores Harry Rosen and Holt Renfrew, Max Mara, Moncler, Brooks Brothers, Roots Canada, Sephora, H&M, and Aritzia.

Eataly, a large format Italian marketplace, also operates a substantial flagship store on the street. Occupying a 50,000 square foot location in the newly renovated Manulife Centre.

=== Shopping centres ===
- Cumberland Terrace
- Manulife Centre
- 2 Bloor East (formerly Hudson's Bay Centre)
- Holt Renfrew Centre

== See also ==
- Robson Street
