= Yorkville, Toronto =

Yorkville
- Neighbourhood
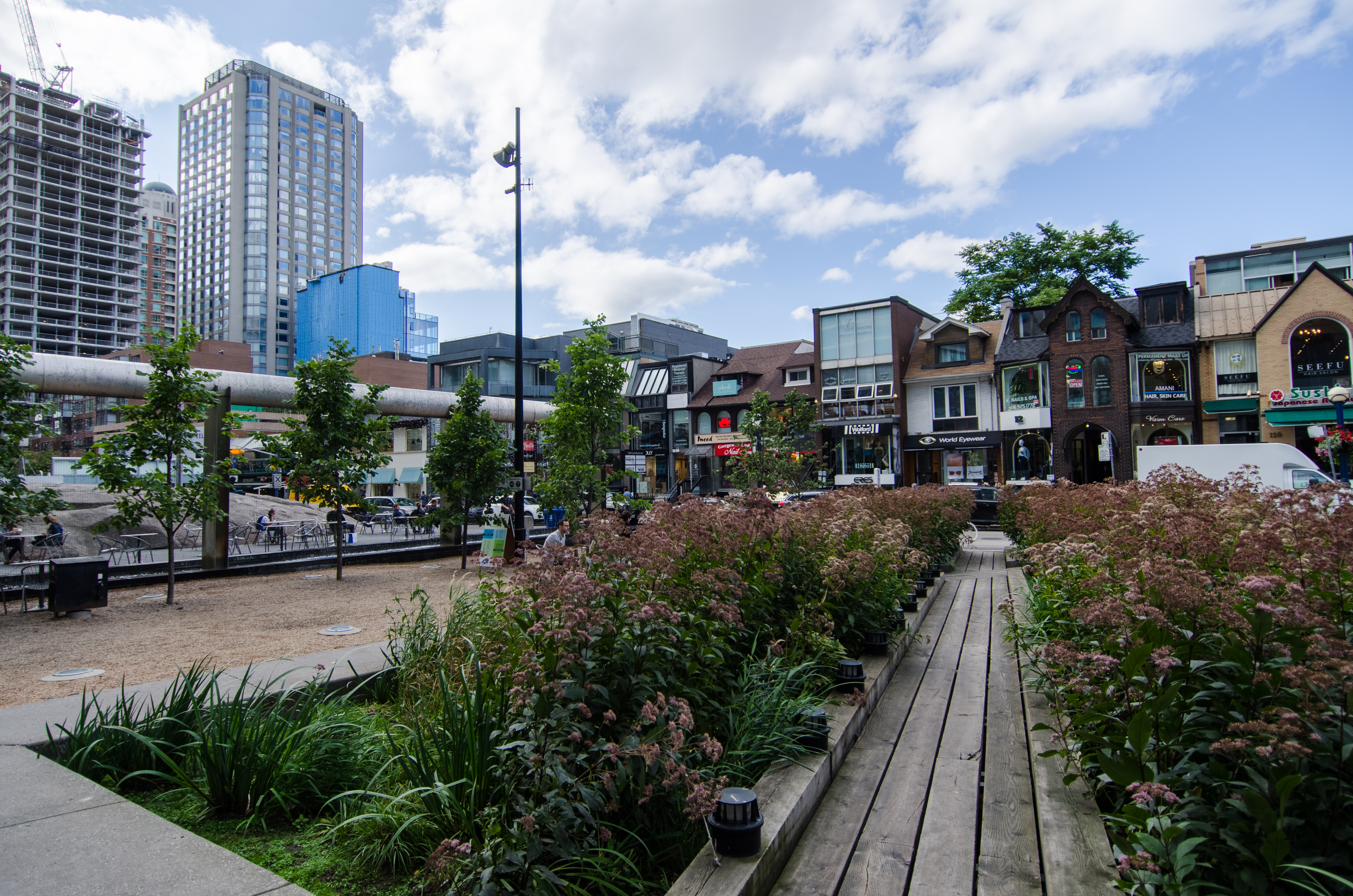
- Village of Yorkville Park in 2022

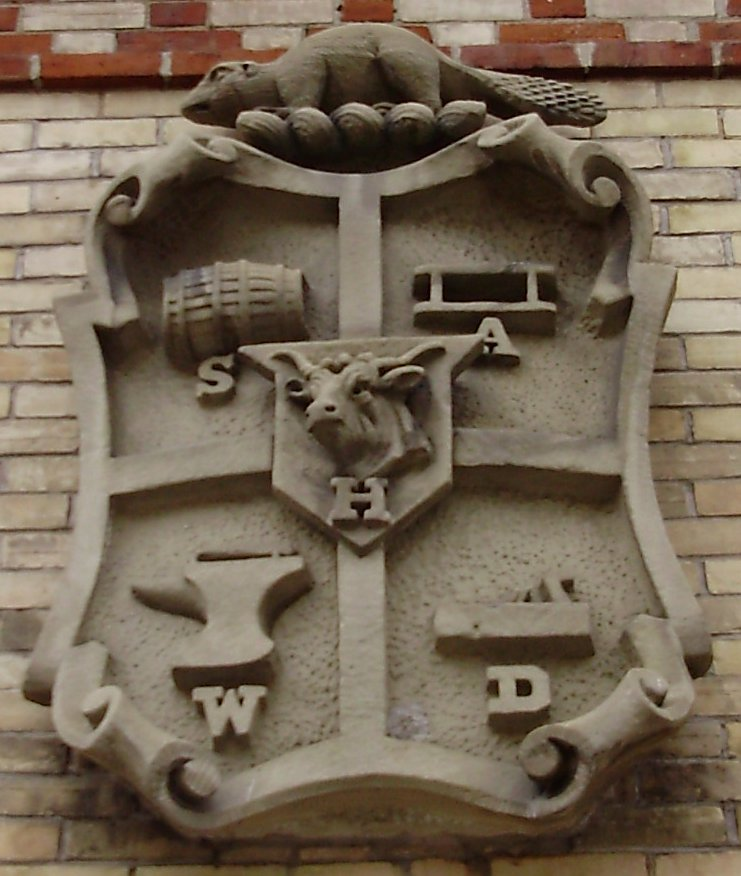
- Coat of arms

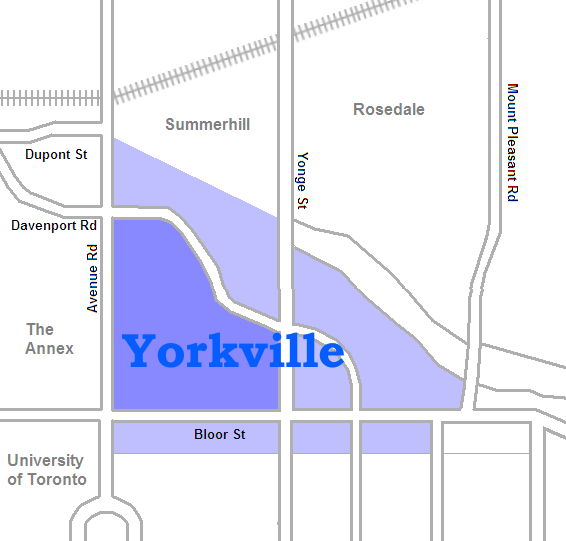
- Historically Yorkville was the area north of Bloor and east of Avenue Rd., today a number of other areas are also considered part of the district

- Location within Toronto
- Coordinates: 43°40′13″N 79°23′28″W
- Country: Canada
- Province: Ontario
- City: Toronto
- Established: 1830
- Incorporated: 1853 (as village)
- Annexed: 1883 (by City of Toronto)

Government
  - MP: Danielle Martin (Liberal)
  - MPP: Jessica Bell (NDP)
  - Councillor: Dianne Saxe (Green)

Area
  - Total: 0.329 km^{2} (0.127 sq mi)

Population (2021)
  - Total: 5,349
  - Density: 16,258/km^{2} (42,110/sq mi)
- Time zone: UTC-5 (EST)
  - Summer (DST): UTC-4 (EDT)
- Area codes: 416, 647

Yorkville is a neighbourhood and former village in Toronto, Ontario, Canada. It is roughly bounded by Bloor Street to the south, Davenport Road to the north, Yonge Street to the east and Avenue Road to the west, and it is part of The Annex neighbourhood. Established as a separate community in 1830, it was annexed into Toronto in 1883. Yorkville comprises residential areas, office space, and retail shopping.

The Mink Mile shopping district on Bloor Street is located in Yorkville.

== History ==
Federal census population history of North Yorkville
Year	Pop.	±%
1871	2,203	—
1881	4,825	+119.0%
Source: Statistics Canada

Yorkville was funded in 1830 by the entrepreneur Joseph Bloor (after whom Bloor Street, one of Toronto's main thoroughfares, is named) and William Botsford Jarvis of Rosedale and began as a residential suburb. Bloor operated a brewery northeast of today's Bloor and Church Street intersection, and Jarvis was Sheriff of the Home District. The two purchased land in the Yorkville area and subdivided it into smaller lots on new side streets for those interested in living in the cleaner air outside York.

The political centre of Yorkville was the Red Lion Hotel, an inn that was regularly used as the polling place for elections. It is there that William Lyon Mackenzie was voted back into the Legislature for 1832, and a huge procession took him down Yonge Street.

The community grew enough to be connected in 1849 by an omnibus service to Toronto. By 1853, the population of Yorkville had reached 1,000, the figure needed to incorporate as a village, and the "Village of Yorkville" was incorporated. Development increased and by the 1870s, "Potter's Field", a cemetery stretching east of Yonge Street along the north side of Concession Road (today's Bloor Street) was closed, and the remains moved to the Toronto Necropolis and Mount Pleasant Cemetery.

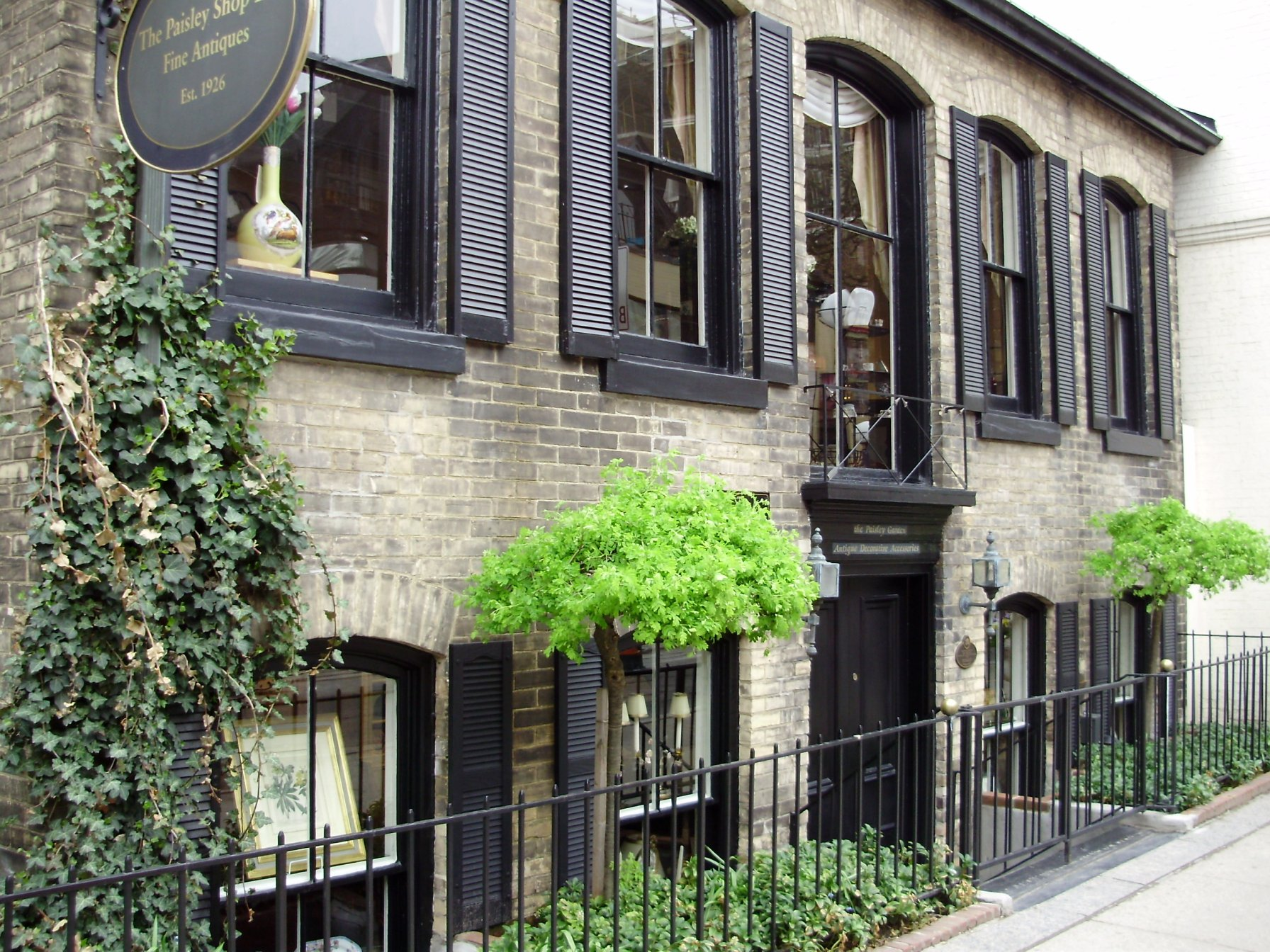
John Daniels' House, 1867

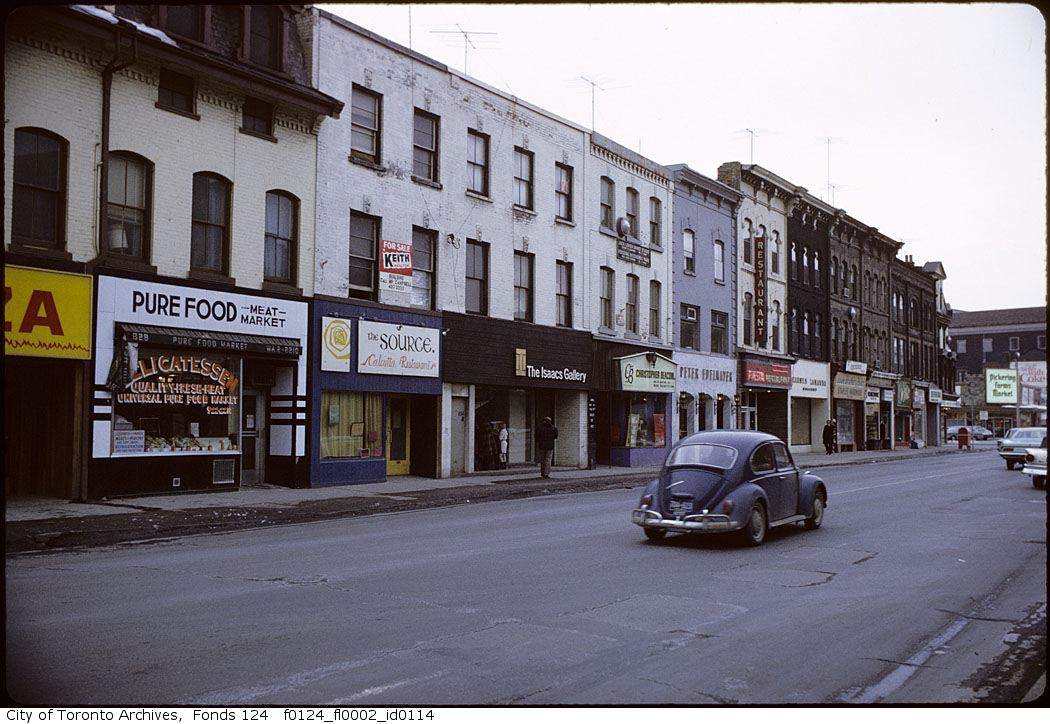
Stores in Yorkville, circa 1975

By the 1880s, the cost of delivering services to the large population of Yorkville was beyond the Village's ability. It petitioned the Toronto government to be annexed. Annexation came on February 1, 1883, and Yorkville's name changed officially from the "Village of Yorkville" to "St. Paul's Ward", and the former "Yorkville Town Hall" became "St. Paul's Hall".

The character of the suburb did not change, and its Victorian-style homes, residential streets, and gardens survived into the 20th century. In 1923, Toronto Hebrew Maternity and Convalescent Hospital was opened at 100 Yorkville Avenue, and a year later, its name was changed to Mount Sinai Hospital. The facade of the building still stands today and housed the retailer Chanel.

In the 1960s, Yorkville flourished as Toronto's bohemian cultural centre. It was the breeding ground for some of Canada's most noted musical talents, including Joni Mitchell, Neil Young, and Gordon Lightfoot, as well as then-underground literary figures such as Margaret Atwood, Gwendolyn MacEwen, and Dennis Lee. Yorkville was also known as the Canadian centre of the hippie movement. In 1968, the nearby Rochdale College at the University of Toronto was opened on Bloor Street as an experiment in counterculture education. Those influenced by their time in 1960s to 1970s Yorkville include the cyberpunk writer William Gibson.

Yorkville's domination by hippies and young people led MPP Syl Apps to refer to it as "a festering sore in the middle of the city" and call for its "eradication." Joni Mitchell captured a colourful impression of the nightlife scene on Yorkville Avenue in her song "Night in the City." The hippie scene was also depicted in the National Film Board of Canada documentary Christopher's Movie Matinée in 1968.

After the construction of the Bloor subway, the value of land nearby increased, as higher densities were allowed by the city's official plan. Along Bloor Street, office towers and The Bay and the Holt Renfrew department stores displaced the local retail. As real estate values increased, the residential homes north of Bloor along Yorkville were converted into high-end retail, including art galleries, fashion boutiques, antique stores, bars, cafes, and eateries along Cumberland Street and Yorkville Avenue. Many smaller buildings were demolished and offices and hotels were built in the 1970s, with high-priced condominium developments being built in subsequent decades.

== Demographics ==
Historical population
Year	2006	2011	2016	2021
Pop.	2,911	3,288	3,896	5,349
±%	—	+13.0%	+18.5%	+37.3%

== Attractions ==
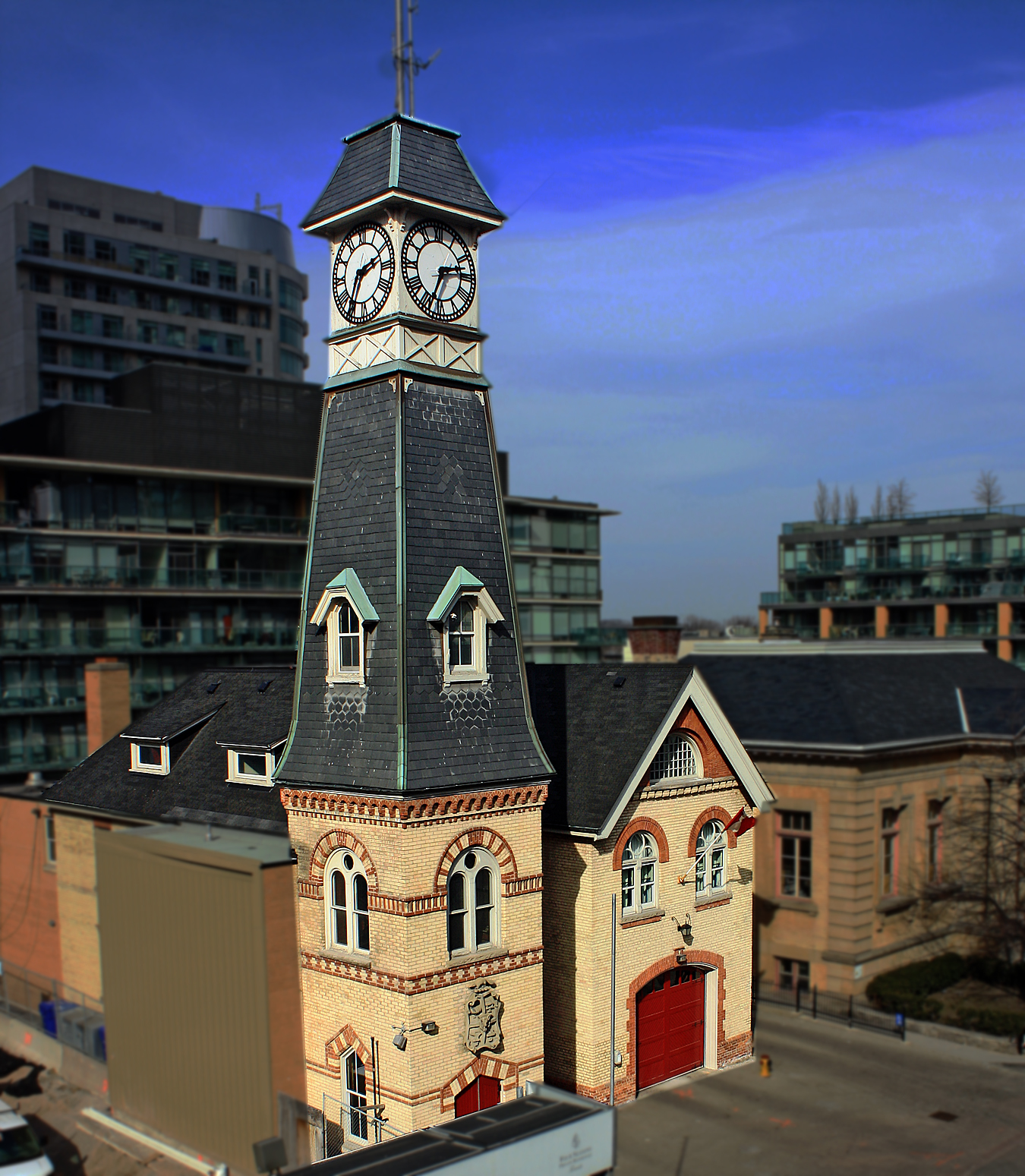
Fire Station 312

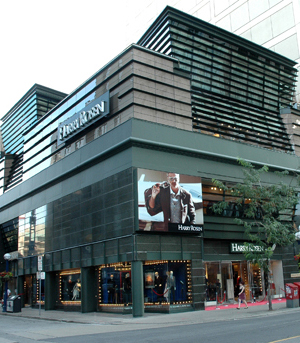
Harry Rosen store on the Mink Mile

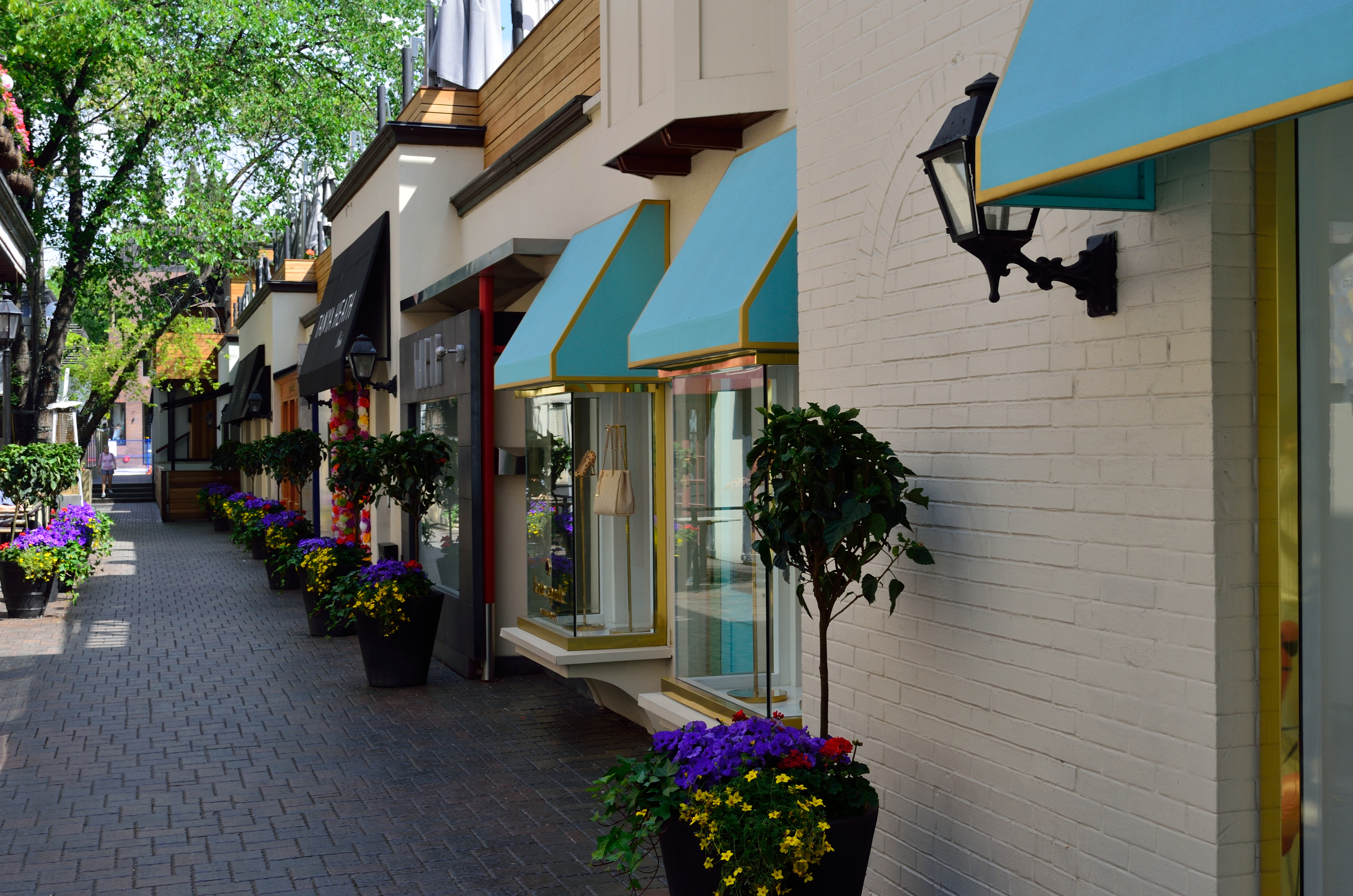
Boutique stores in Yorkville

=== Shopping and commerce ===
The Mink Mile shopping district is located on Bloor Street and includes office buildings with retail stores in the bottom one or two floors. The main streets of Avenue Road and Bay Street north of Bloor are similarly developed. North of Bloor, on Yorkville and Cumberland streets, between the main arteries, the character changes to smaller buildings containing art galleries, first-floor retail, and restaurants. Further north still are single-family detached and semi-detached homes dating to the 19th century.

Yorkville has shopping, restaurants, Yorkville Village mall, and the first five-star hotel in Canada. Hotels in include the Four Seasons Toronto, Park Hyatt Toronto, Hazelton Hotel, Windsor Arms Hotel, the Residence on Bay, The Yorkville Royal Sonesta Hotel and W Toronto.

=== Parks ===
The Village of Yorkville Park is a series of gardens that includes Scots Pines growing out of circular benches, a set of metal archways among a row of crabapple trees, a marshy wetland, a waterfall bordering one side of a courtyard filled with benches and chairs, and a 650-tonne granite rock.

Frank Stollery Parkette is a wedge-shaped park named for local businessman and politician Frank Stollery; the park commemorates the history of Davenport Road.

Jesse Ketchum Park is named for the Canadian politician Jesse Ketchum, and is a greenspace park with a playground, located next to Jesse Ketchum Public School.

Town Hall Square commemorates the site of Yorkville Town Hall and is an urban oasis with paths and benches sheltered between rows of hedges, trees, and oversized pots. It abuts the Yorkville branch of the Toronto Public Library.

== See also ==
- Bloor Street Culture Corridor
- List of neighbourhoods in Toronto
