= Forma (Toronto) =

Proposed skyscraper project

Forma East
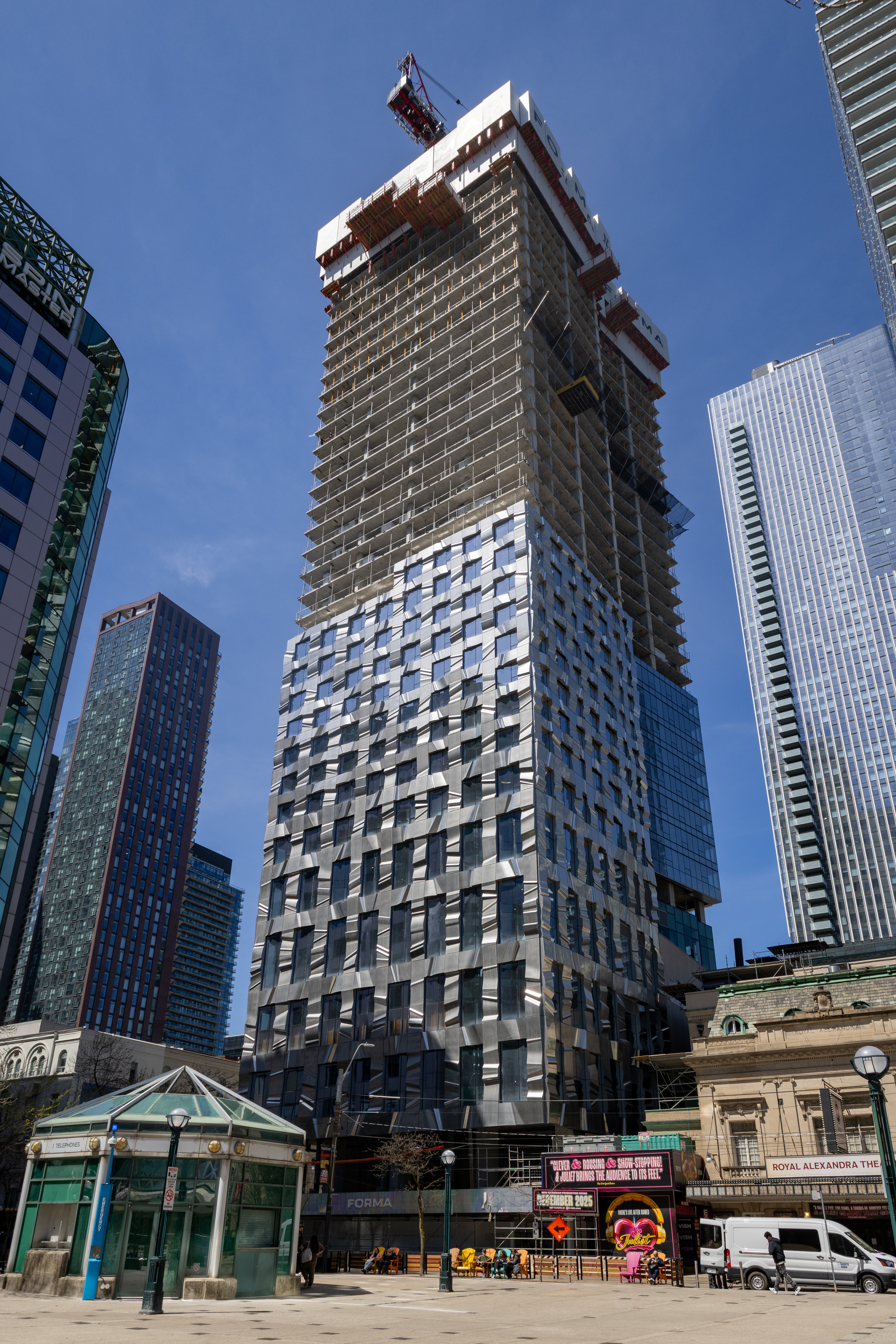
- Under construction in April 2026
- Interactive map of the Forma East area

General information
- Status: Under construction
- Type: Mixed-use
- Architectural style: Deconstructivism
- Location: 266 King Street West; Toronto, Ontario, Canada
- Coordinates: 43°38′50″N 79°23′17″W
- Groundbreaking: June 7, 2023
- Estimated completion: 2028

Height
- Height: 266.5 metres (874 ft)

Technical details
- Floor count: 84 and 74
- Floor area: 616,900 square feet (57,310 m^{2})

Design and construction
- Architects: Frank Gehry, Adamson Associates Architects (as executive architect)
- Developer: Great Gulf

Forma, also known as Mirvish+Gehry, is a planned two-tower mixed-use building complex in Toronto, Ontario, Canada. The towers were designed by Frank Gehry in partnership with David Mirvish. The project is located on King Street West at Duncan Street in Toronto's Entertainment District.

== Architecture ==
The two towers are to be 84 and 74 floors respectively. The towers are of irregular and twisting forms that go against traditional rigid structures, which is a hallmark of deconstructivist architecture. When completed, the taller of the two towers will be among the tallest skyscrapers in Toronto and one of the tallest skyscrapers in Canada (ahead of First Canadian Place). The smaller of the two towers will be 6 m (20 ft) shorter than Toronto's current tallest condo, Aura.

== Location ==
The two towers will lie on either side of Duncan street (a.k.a. Ed Mirvish Way). Together, they are set to have 2,038 units. Beneath the condos, earlier iterations of the development plan included a hotel in the west tower, a new campus for the OCAD University, and a public art gallery devoted to Mirvish's collection of abstract expressionist art. The design of the buildings has been compared to New York's IAC Building. Toronto-born Frank Gehry was also the main architect behind Toronto's Art Gallery of Ontario building.

== History ==
The former Reid Building on the site of the east tower next to the Royal Alexandra Theatre, 1981

The original plan, released in 2012, was for three towers and included demolition of the Mirvish-owned Princess of Wales Theatre and some early 1900s-era heritage buildings. Although the architecture was praised, the project was criticized for the demolition of the theatre and heritage buildings and the overall scale of the project. After consultation with the City of Toronto government, the project plan was changed to two towers, will spare the theatre, and preserve elements of the heritage buildings. The new complex plan was approved for construction in 2014. In October 2017, Mirvish sold the project to Great Gulf Corporation, builders of the One Bloor tower in Toronto, which will develop it.

In December 2018, height extension to both towers were submitted to the City of Toronto—328m for the west tower and 305m for the east tower, meaning both would be classified as 'supertall' skyscrapers (taller than 300m)—however, this request was not approved.

The plan was updated again in early 2021, with the height of the west tower reduced to 308m and the height of the east tower reduced to 268.5m. The updated designs also excluded a planned hotel that had been shown on previous iterations as occupying floors 10-20 of the west tower.

On June 7, 2023, construction on the east tower began, with Gehry speaking at the occasion.

In December 2025, the developers confirmed that the west tower will be built, but said that they will wait until market conditions improve.

== See also ==
- City of Capitals
- The One
