= One Bloor West =

Supertall skyscraper under construction in Toronto, Canada

- Under construction in November 2026

Record height
- Tallest in Canada from 2025 to 2026^{[I]}
- Preceded by: First Canadian Place
- Surpassed by: SkyTower at Pinnacle One Yonge

General information
- Status: Topped-out
- Type: Residential, retail, hotel
- Location: 1 Bloor Street West; Toronto, Ontario, Canada
- Coordinates: 43°40′11.7″N 79°23′13.3″W
- Groundbreaking: August 23, 2017
- Estimated completion: 2028
- Cost: CA$2 billion

Height
- Height: 308.6 metres (1,012.4 ft)

Technical details
- Floor count: 85

Design and construction
- Architecture firm: Foster and Partners; Core Architects
- Developer: Mizrahi Developments; Tridel (since May 2025)

Other information
- Public transit: Bloor–Yonge station

Website
- onebloorwest.com

One Bloor West, previously known as The One, is a supertall skyscraper currently under construction in Toronto, Ontario, Canada. When completed, it would have been the tallest building in Canada, but was surpassed during construction by Pinnacle One Yonge. At a revised 308.6 metres (1,013 feet) and a revised 85 storeys, it will be taller than First Canadian Place, which had been Canada's tallest building since 1975. It would have been Canada's first supertall (> 300 m) skyscraper, as defined by the Council on Tall Buildings and Urban Habitat. Construction of the building is estimated to be completed by 2028.

Located in Toronto's Yorkville neighbourhood at the intersection of Yonge Street and Bloor Street, One Bloor West is across the street from the 257-metre-tall (843 ft) One Bloor condominium building. It will also stand next to Two Bloor West, an existing skyscraper completed in 1972. The site of The One involved land assembly that includes properties at 768 Yonge Street, in addition to those at 1 and 11 Bloor Street West.

Developer Sam Mizrahi acquired the land in October 2014 for CA$300 million. Mizrahi received approval from the city to build on September 12, 2016. The total cost for the project was estimated to be $1 billion during planning stages, but that figure had ballooned to $2 billion at the time of the receivership filing in October 2023.

== Design ==
Mizrahi hired the London-based Foster and Partners as the design architect, and Core Architects as the local architect. He travelled to London to design the building using an exoskeleton structure. The design of the building was revised based on recommendations from RWDI and the organization's wind tunnel testing. The final design no longer features a structural exoskeleton; however, it retains diagonal hangers which maintain a triangulated appearance. The structural engineer of record for the project is RJC Engineers. The extra height of the building has been determined to not have increased shadowing impacts on nearby parks.

=== Retail and hotel ===
The first 18 storeys of One Bloor West will include restaurants, event spaces, two major retailers and a luxury Hyatt hotel created under its boutique Andaz brand. The 160-room Andaz Toronto will occupy the fourth to sixteenth floors of the building, with the lobby on the fourth floor and an outdoor pool deck on the sixth floor.

The original plan for the highly visible ground floor retail space was for an Apple Store move in to a space designed by Foster and Partners. As of December 2023, that space is without a tenant following One Bloor West’s receivership filing in October 2023. In March 2022, Apple launched a lawsuit to terminate its lease agreement with Mizrahi Developments, and claimed $6.9 million in delay damages, expressing "profound disappointment" with One Bloor West’s developers in regards to missed deadlines; Press reports following the receivership filing confirmed that the Apple will not move into the space.

According to photographer Pedro Marques, the store was to feature a three-story vaulted ceiling with a cantilevered mezzanine over the main floor, a build which was complicated by Apple's requirements that there be no interior columns, and was to be fronted by three-story glass panels. Manufactured in Gersthofen, Germany, each glass panel measures over 2.3 metres (7 ft 7 in) wide, 11.5 metres (38 ft) high and 10.9 centimetres (4.3 in) thick, with eight sheets of laminated glass. The retail portion of the tower was originally scheduled to open in 2021.

=== Residential ===
Above the retail outlet, the tower's residential section will have a total of 416 units. One Bloor West will include four penthouse units. Four storeys of parking will exist underground, and the building will connect to the Bloor–Yonge station and nearby buildings via an underground walkway system similar to (but separate from) the city's PATH system.

== Acquiring the property ==
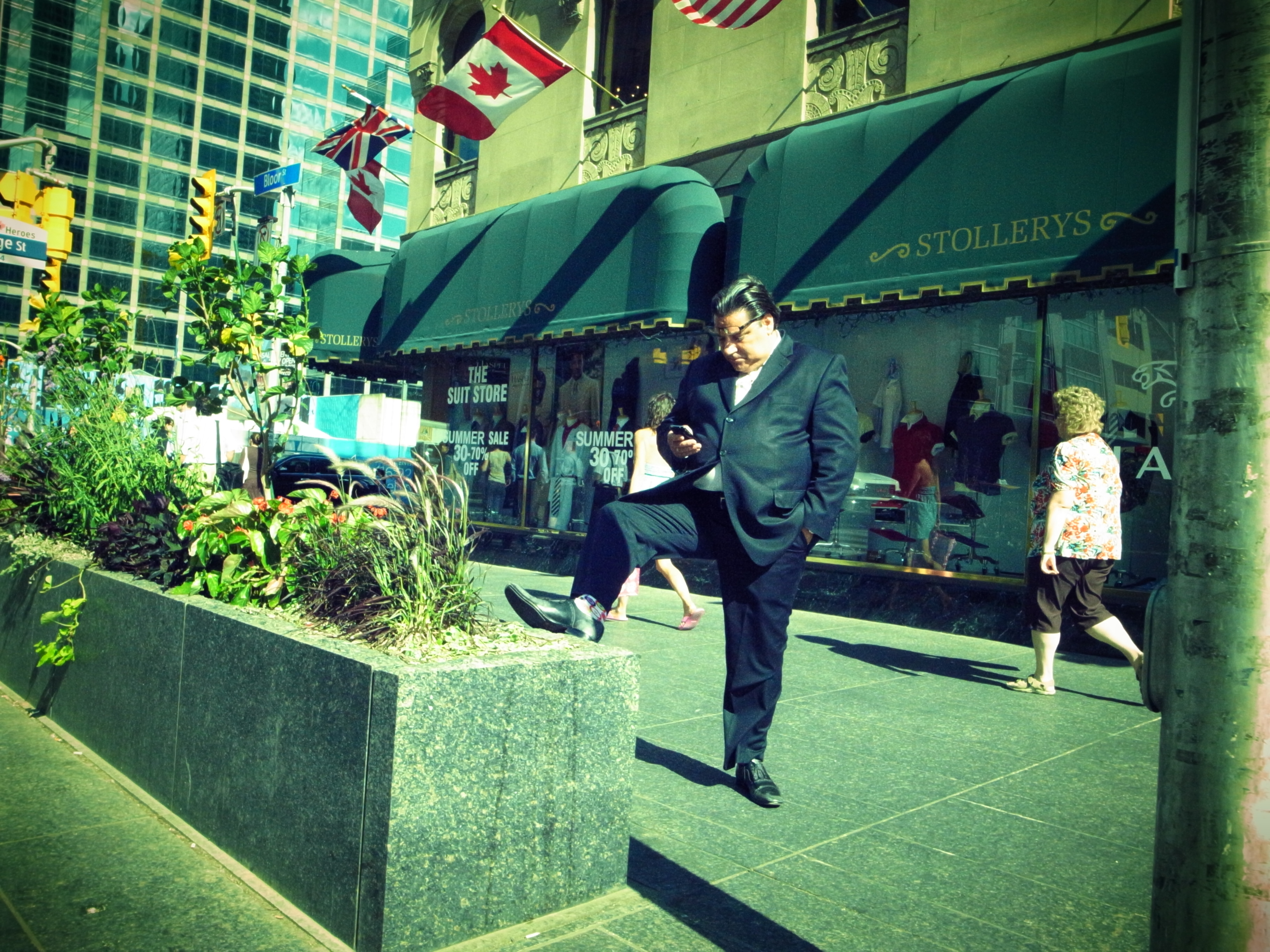
Stollerys building in 2011

For 114 years, where One Bloor West will be built, was the location of Stollerys, a men's and women's fine clothing store founded by president Ed Whaley and owned by his family. Other developers had interest in buying and developing One Bloor West. However, Mizrahi met with Whaley regularly and the two developed a friendship around shared values. Whaley called Mizrahi a "gentleman" and someone who "builds a quality building". After Mizrahi purchased the properties for One Bloor West, Mizrahi provided a written promise to Whaley that a monument, built from the stones of Stollerys, would be developed at the site of One Bloor West.

On January 7, 2015, Mizrahi applied for a demolition permit of the Stollerys building. Six days later, local Councillor Kristyn Wong-Tam put forward a motion at the Toronto and East York Community Council in order to designate the building as a heritage site. However, Mizrahi was granted the demolition permit on January 16, and in order to prevent the heritage designation, started to demolish the building on the weekend starting Saturday, January 17. These actions angered many in the heritage groups and prompted calls for new processes for heritage and demolition in the city of Toronto.

== Progress ==
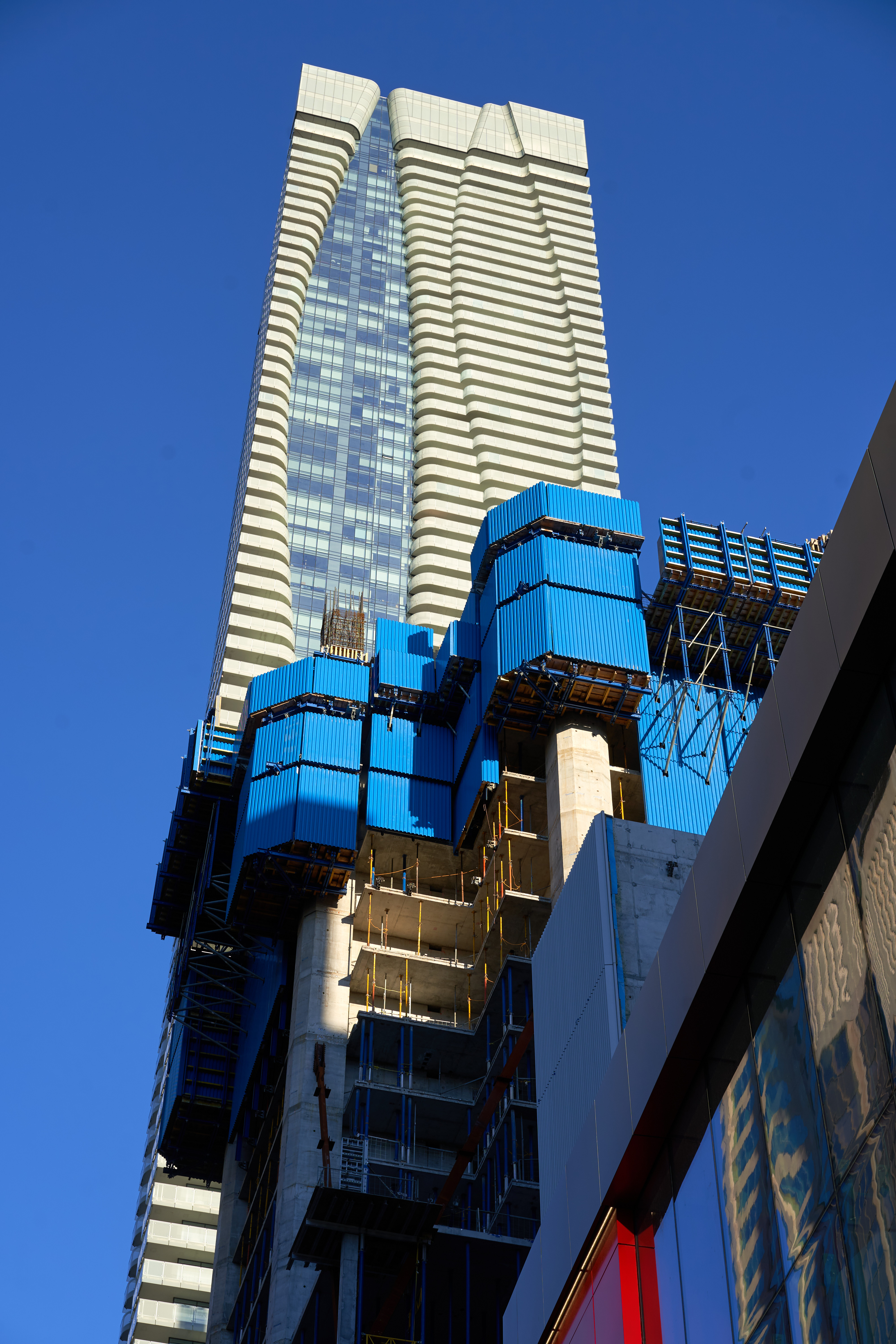
The One showing slip form construction in October 2022 next to One Bloor

In June 2016, the city of Toronto's planning staff gave a positive report on plans for One Bloor West’s development, including in their report a number of community benefit recommendations. The report found that plans for One Bloor West met Toronto's planning policies and guidelines. On April 18, 2017, the project was approved by the Ontario Municipal Board (OMB). With approval both by the OMB and by Toronto's city council, pre-construction as well as pre-sales of One Bloor West’s units began. By spring 2017, more than 3,000 people had pre-registered for the 416 residential units.

In August 2017, One Bloor West secured its new round of lending replacing existing debt, with Firm Capital Corp. lending CA$135 million (US$108 million) as a first mortgage on One Bloor West. In November 2017, One Bloor West’s presentation centre opened for the first time for people who pre-registered.

On August 23, 2017, construction of One Bloor West officially broke ground, with excavation nearly complete as of October 2018. In November 2018, a special crane, the Link-Belt TG2300B, described by a source as potentially the highest capacity crane deployed in Toronto, was brought to the site to begin construction of the tower. The creation of 32 mega caissons, which are used to support the tower, was completed in April 2019. On May 1, 2019, it was announced that The One was to include a 160-room Andaz hotel.

In September 2019, One Bloor West secured a new round of financing, with Korean fund IGIS Asset Management Co. Ltd. lending CA$560 million (US$423 million) to the project. In October 2019, a mock-up was installed to physically illustrate One Bloor West’s brushed aluminum and glazing cladding.

In December 2019, construction halted on the building, with the City of Toronto issuing a "stop-work order" on the site. On August 31, 2020, the building was issued a conditional above-grade permit by the City of Toronto, allowing for above-grade construction of the building to begin. Work on the second floor began in December 2020 with the laying of floor forms and assembly of rebar. Construction of the surrounding podium structure has also started. In January 2021, Mizrahi Developments applied through an addendum for a height increase for One Bloor West to 94 storeys with a planned height of 338.3 metres. In June 2023, the City of Toronto approved the final height to 91 storeys and 328.4 metres.

On January 9, 2024, the heritage facade restoration, part of the project, at 774 and 776 Yonge Street was revealed. The restored 19th-century heritage facade will become part of the ground-level retail at Yonge and Bloor.

== Receivership ==
In October 2023, almost a year past the planned December 2022 completion date, the condo was put into receivership by the lenders who claimed necessary payments had not been made. The project has multiple lenders and total debt in excess of $1.6 billion as of October 2023. The receivership request was made after Mizrahi Developments defaulted on $1.23 billion of the debt. Key lenders identified at the time of the receivership filing were:

- KEB Hana Bank of Korea, is described as being the main lender to the project.
- China-East Resources Import & Export Corporation, a Chinese state-owned bank is owed $182 million.
- Aviva Canada, an insurance company that is owed $130 million.

One Bloor West has substantial unsold units, with 70 of the 416 planned units being unsold at the time of the receivership filing. The retail space originally designed for Apple also remains without a tenant after Apple pulled out due the project's delays in 2022.

On October 18, 2023, it was announced the project received an additional $315 million in funding to go towards ongoing construction and development costs.

In August 2025, KEB Hana Bank filed an application demanding that Mizrahi and Jenny Coco repay $1.5 billion in principal. interest and fees. KEB, represented by Osler, Hoskin & Harcourt, claims that Mizrahi and Coco guaranteed the debt personally.

Since mid 2025 Tridel has taken over the development, construction and sales management of the property from Mizrahi. Tridel's first action was renaming The One to One Bloor West. In November 2025, Tridel announced they would cancel all prior presales contracts and return the approximately $105M in deposits, with a relaunch expected for early 2026.

== See also ==
- List of tallest buildings in Canada
- Mirvish+Gehry
- 2 Bloor East
- Number One Bloor – skyscraper across the street from One Bloor West, at 1 Bloor E
- Tridel
