= Sam Mizrahi =

Canadian real estate developer (born 1971)

- Born: Sam Mizrahi (Persian: سام میزراهی); 1971 (age 54–55); Tehran, Iran
- Citizenship: Canadian
- Occupation: Real estate developer
- Years active: 2007–present
- Known for: Real estate development in Toronto and Ottawa
- Notable work: The One

Sam Mizrahi (Persian: سام میزراهی or سام مزراحی; Hebrew: סם מזרחי, born 1971) is an Iranian-born Canadian real estate developer who is active in Toronto. Mizrahi is currently the president of a number of corporations, including Mizrahi Developments, Mizrahi Inc. and Mizrahi Enterprises Inc. He is best known for being the developer of The One skyscraper at the intersection of Yonge and Bloor streets in Toronto. In 2015, Toronto Life named him the 45th-most-influential person in Toronto.

== Early life ==
Mizrahi was born in Tehran, Iran, in 1971 to Iranian Jewish parents, Shamoil and Ziba Mizrahi. His father was a business owner who owned and operated shops in the famous market of Tehran. The family immigrated to Canada in 1977, two years before the 1979 Iranian Revolution, when Mizrahi was six years old. Mizrahi is Jewish and has described his upbringing as part of the Iranian Jewish community that emigrated from Iran during that period.

== Career ==
In 1992, Mizrahi formed a dry cleaning company known as Dove Cleaners. DoveCorp, as it came to be known in 2004, operated both in retail dry cleaning and commercial linen cleaning. Mizrahi listed the company on the TSX Venture Exchange in 2005 and ran it until 2007, when it filed for restructuring.

Mizrahi is the founder and President of Mizrahi Developments, a real estate developer that has developed projects in Toronto that include 133 Hazelton, 181 Davenport, 128 Hazelton and Forest Hill Jewish Centre, and 1451 Wellington in Ottawa. In 2024, his company initiated court-supervised restructuring proceedings to support the completion of the 1451 Wellington development. In 2011, Mizrahi started development of his first condominium project, a 9-story building in Toronto known as 133 Hazelton Residences. Three years later, in 2014, he made headlines when he purchased land at the southwest corner of Yonge Street and Bloor Street for development of what he called "The One", the tallest residential building in Canada.

=== The One (Toronto) ===
Proposed as an 91-story residential skyscraper with multi-level retail at the base, "The One" will be the tallest condominium tower in Canada, according to Mizrahi. Mizrahi paid over $300 million for the land acquisition alone. The total cost for the project is reported to be $1 billion.

Mizrahi hired the London-based Foster and Partners as the design architect, and Core Architects as the local architect. He travelled to London to design the building using an exoskeleton structure. The building's design and height have gone through multiple revisions; most recently, the expensive exoskeleton structure was removed from the tower and limited to the podium of the building.

Set to replace Stollerys as the podium tenant is Toronto's new Apple Store with approximately 19,000 square feet of ground floor retail space, superseding Apple's current store at Eaton Centre. The One's designer Foster and Partners also designed Apple's stores in Chicago, Miami, Hong Kong and Macau. According to photographer Pedro Marques, the store will feature a three-story vaulted ceiling with a cantilevered mezzanine over the main floor, a build which was complicated by Apple's requirements that there be no interior columns, and will be fronted by three-story glass panels. Manufactured in Gersthofen, Germany, each glass panel measures over 2.3 meters wide, 11.5 meters high and 10.9 centimeters thick, with eight sheets of laminated glass.

Construction of The One was plagued by delays. The project was placed in receivership by the Ontario Superior Court of Justice in October 2023. The project's total debt was reported at more than $1.6 billion. On October 18, 2023, it was announced the project received an additional $315 million in funding to go towards ongoing construction and development costs. In December 2024, Tridel was selected to complete the construction of The One while under receivership.

In December 2023, The One reached skyscraper status having crossed the 150-metre threshold in its construction. At this height it is over halfway towards its full height. Once complete it will include 647 residential units along with hotel and retail spaces.

== Personal life ==
Mizrahi is an active supporter of Israel and a member of the UJA, and has managed and participated in the annual Walk With Israel parade in Toronto. He is also on the board of directors of the Friends of Simon Wiesenthal Center for Holocaust Studies.
