= Millennium Hilton =

Millennium Hilton may refer to:

- Millennium Hilton New York Downtown, a Hilton hotel in lower Manhattan, New York City, United States
- Millennium Hilton New York One UN Plaza
- Millennium Hilton Seoul, a Hilton hotel in Seoul, South Korea
