= IGIS Asset Management =

South Korea real estate investment firm

IGIS Asset Management Co., Ltd
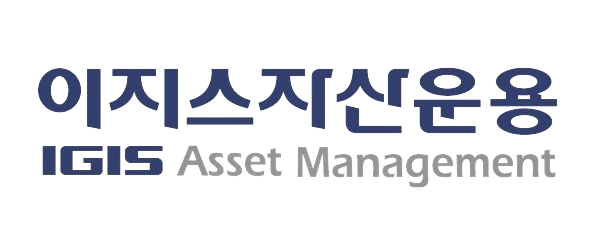
- Native name: 이지스자산운용
- Formerly: PS Asset Management
- Type: Private
- Industry: Private equity real estate
- Founded: 2010; 16 years ago
- Founder: Kim Dai Young
- Headquarters: Seoul, South Korea
- Key people: Kabjoo(KJ) Cho; Kyusung(Joseph) Lee; Donghoon Shin; Sockwoo Jung
- AUM: US$50.3 billion (2024)
- Number of employees: 439 (2025)
- Website: www.igisam.com

IGIS Asset Management (also IGIS; short for Integrated Global Investment Solution) is a real estate investment firm headquartered in Seoul, South Korea. IGIS is South Korea's largest real estate asset manager. In 2022, IREI ranked IGIS as the second largest real estate manager in Asia based on assets under management.

== Background ==
The firm was founded in 2010 as PS Asset Management by Kim Dai Young. In 2012, the firm was rebranded to IGIS Asset Management.

In 2015, Kim stepped down from managing duties of the firm and was succeeded by Cho Kab Joo and Andie Kang who would become Co-CEOs of the firm. Later on Joseph Lee also became an additional Co-CEO of the firm.

In 2018, the firm filed for an initial public offering on the Korea Exchange but the process was stopped after the death of Kim in October. There was a change in ownership of the firm where 45.5% of its shares were transferred to Kim's wife while their son and daughter will inherit none of the shares and would not be involved with management of the firm.

The firm established IGIS Private Equity in 2018. In 2021, it was acquired by BlackRock.

The firm has a venture capital arm named IGIS Investment Partners. In 2022, IGIS planned to spin it off into a joint venture with Kohlberg Kravis Roberts (KKR). However the deal was delayed after IGIS was put under investigation by the Financial Supervisory Service. By 2024, the deal had fallen through although some IGIS staff still the firm to join KKR.

In 2024, it was reported that IGIS was in a significant crisis due to the slump in the real estate sector, regulatory issues as well as poor financial performance.

IGIS has additional offices in Frankfurt, London, New York and Singapore.

== Overview and history ==
IGIS Asset Management is an independent investment manager specializing in alternative assets. It was founded in 2010 by the late chairman Kim Dae-young. Originally established as PS Asset Management, the company later adopted its current name and focused on commercial real estate investment.

From its early years, the company pursued international expansion alongside institutional investors, including South Korean pension funds. Its acquisition of a property in London in 2012 marked an early move into overseas real estate.

The company subsequently undertook domestic development projects while diversifying across property sectors and expanding into logistics and digital infrastructure. According to the company's history, it became the first South Korean asset manager to develop a logistics facility through a direct transaction with Amazon and the first to complete the development and sale of a data center.

IGIS has also expanded beyond real estate and infrastructure into traditional asset classes, including equities and bonds. According to the company, it manages assets for approximately 200 institutional investors in South Korea and abroad, including pension funds, mutual aid associations, and financial institutions.

== Assets under management ==
As of December 31, 2025, IGIS reported assets under management (AUM) of KRW 33.1456 trillion on the Korea Financial Investment Association's disclosure basis, which combines fund net asset value with the assessed value of discretionary investment mandates. Media reporting citing figures compiled by the company through fund administrators put total assets under management at approximately KRW 73.3 trillion, comprising roughly KRW 65 trillion in real estate, KRW 3.5 trillion in REITs, KRW 2.6 trillion in infrastructure, and KRW 2.2 trillion in securities.

== Global network ==
Headquartered in Seoul, South Korea, IGIS lists offices or operations in financial centers including New York, London, Tokyo, and Singapore.

== Selected portfolio ==
=== Centerfield ===
Centerfield is a mixed-use property on Teheran-ro in Seoul's Gangnam District, consisting of two towers with up to 36 above-ground floors and seven basement levels. Completed in 2021, it combines office space, a hotel, and retail.

The building uses a smart building management system and was reported in November 2025 as the first commercial property in South Korea to receive WELL Core Platinum certification. Its Gangnam business district location, post-completion leasing and operations, and tenant base have been covered in real estate reporting and company materials.

=== One Grove ===
One Grove is a mixed-use office and retail complex in the Magok area of Seoul's Gangseo District. It has a gross floor area of approximately 463,204 m^{2} (4,985,890 sq ft) across four buildings with 11 above-ground floors and seven basement levels, incorporating offices and the One Grove Mall retail complex, alongside a central garden of approximately 7,600 m^{2} (82,000 sq ft) and typical office floor plates of about 4,000 m^{2} (43,000 sq ft) per building.

Following completion, the property has undergone office leasing and retail operations.

=== One Centinel ===
One Centinel, in Seoul's Yeouido district, is a refurbished office and retail property on the site of the former Shinhan Investment Tower. Acquired in August 2022, it underwent roughly three years of refurbishment, with its retail space opening in September 2025.

The refurbishment expanded lower-level retail space from the first basement level through the third above-ground floor, updated exterior, circulation, and office areas, and adjusted food and beverage tenants and operations.

=== Data centers ===
Through the 40 MW Hanam IDC in Gyeonggi Province, IGIS was reported as the first South Korean asset manager to complete a data center development cycle from land acquisition and construction to sale. It subsequently completed the 80 MW Goyang Samsong Data Center in July 2026, with media reporting plans to pursue additional data center projects in the Seoul and Busan areas toward a target of 520 MW by 2031.

=== IOTA Seoul ===
IOTA Seoul is a planned mixed-use development in central Seoul with a reported gross floor area of approximately 460,000 m^{2} (5,000,000 sq ft), combining office, hotel, and retail space. Plans integrate sites near Seoul Station (including the Metro Building, Seoullo Tower, and former Millennium Hilton Seoul site) along the corridor toward Namsan.

Reporting on the project notes planned office towers (IOTA 1 and IOTA 2) alongside a hotel, large floor plates, building systems designed for AI workloads and energy efficiency, and planned public green space linking toward Namsan Park.

== Market position and recent developments ==
=== Market position and media coverage ===
South Korean and international financial media have covered IGIS in connection with its real estate AUM and corporate transactions. In May 2019, Pulse reported on plans to pursue a stock market listing. In November 2021, Pulse reported that IGIS ranked second in Asian real estate AUM in an Institutional Real Estate, Inc. (IREI) survey. In February 2025, KED Global covered plans regarding a controlling stake sale.

Largest shareholder Son Hwa-ja expressed an intention to sell her stake citing personal reasons, including health. Following a sale process, Hillhouse Investment was selected as preferred bidder in December 2025, and the transaction process ended in July 2026 without completion.

=== Kabjoo Cho's return and management developments ===
Kabjoo Cho, an early member of IGIS who previously served as CEO until 2021 and led new business development, returned as chief executive officer in April 2026. Media reported in May 2026 that a Financial Supervisory Service inspection regarding allegations of credit extension to a major shareholder's family-linked entity and information use concluded without adverse action. After the sale process ended, the company reorganized its leadership and operations.

In June 2026, IGIS was selected to manage the KRW 410 billion Regional Bank Financial Stability Support Fund II established by KAMCO and regional banks, and in July 2026 it was named preferred manager for a KRW 150 billion Korea Post mandate.

In October 2026, IGIS completed the KRW 1.05 trillion acquisition of K-Twin Towers in Seoul's Gwanghwamun area, alongside raising KRW 350 billion in equity for related investment plans and continuing work on projects such as the Yangjae-dong The-K Hotel site redevelopment and IOTA Seoul.

== Timeline ==
Year	Milestones	Sources
2010	Established as PS Asset Management on 22 March.	
2012	Renamed IGIS Asset Management in April. Acquired its first overseas asset in London, United Kingdom.	
2016	Established its first fund mandate focused on non-performing loans (NPLs).	
2018	Received approval to establish a REIT asset management company. Ranked first in Asia in the non-listed office category of the GRESB assessment. Plans for an initial public offering in the first quarter of 2019 were reported in September.	
2019	Established a New York subsidiary and a London office. Approval of changes to its ownership structure and renewed IPO plans were reported in May. Registered a UK establishment on 14 October.	
2020	Listed IGIS Value Plus REIT and IGIS Residence REIT on the South Korean stock market. Established a Singapore subsidiary.	
2021	Recorded KRW 59.9 trillion in AUM, according to the company's historical timeline. Reported as ranking second by Asian real estate AUM in an IREI survey. BlackRock Real Assets' acquisition of IGIS Private Equity was reported in July.	
2022	Established infrastructure and securities divisions. According to the company's historical timeline, became the first South Korean asset manager to sell a US logistics facility developed directly with Amazon.	
2024	Published its first ESG report. According to the company's historical timeline, became the first South Korean asset manager to complete the development and sale of a data center.	
2025	Recorded KRW 73.3 trillion in AUM. According to the company's historical timeline, achieved South Korea's first WiredScore Gold and WELL Core Platinum certifications. Launched the Shared Growth and Future Committee.	

== Properties ==
- Axa Equitable Center
- Millennium Hilton Seoul
- The One
- Trianon
