= Trianon (Frankfurt am Main) =

Skyscraper in Frankfurt, Germany

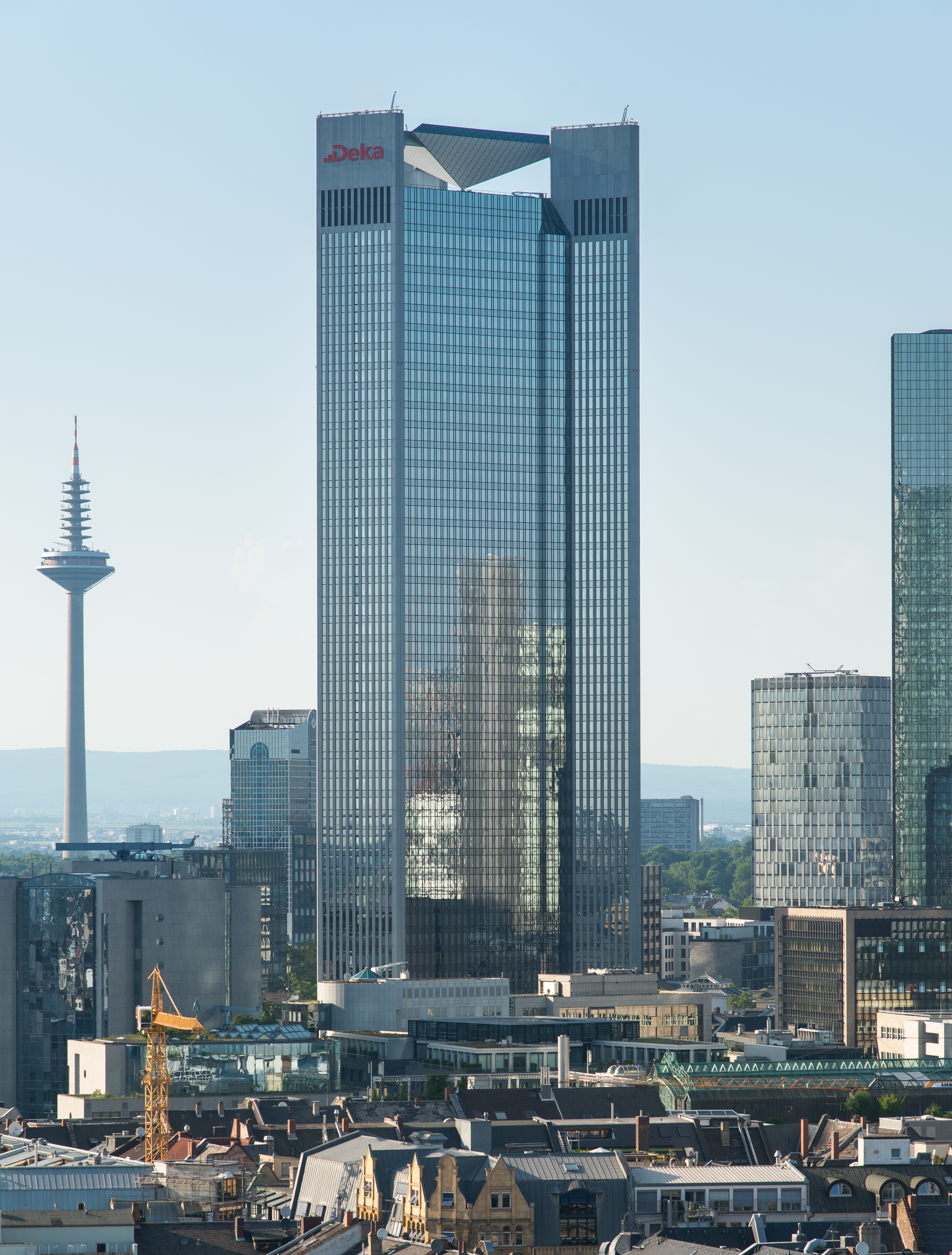
- Interactive map of the Trianon area

General information
- Type: Commercial offices
- Location: Mainzer Landstraße 16-24; Frankfurt; Hesse, Germany
- Coordinates: 50°06′45″N 8°40′00″E
- Construction started: 1990
- Completed: 1993

Height
- Roof: 186 m (610 ft)

Technical details
- Floor count: 45; 4 below ground
- Floor area: 118,000 m^{2} (1,270,000 sq ft)
- Lifts/elevators: 23

Design and construction
- Architects: Novotny Mähner Assoziierte; Hentrich Petschnigg & Partner; Albert Speer & Partner
- Developer: FVH Frankfurter Vermögens-Holding
- Structural engineer: Ingenieurbüro Fritz Nötzold; Philipp Holzmann AG

Other information
- Public transit: Taunusanlage

Trianon is a 45-storey, 186 m (610 ft) skyscraper in the Westend-Süd district of Frankfurt, Germany, completed in 1993. For several decades until 2024, it served as the headquarters for DekaBank; other tenants are Deutsche Bundesbank (since 2015) and Franklin Templeton. Atop the building is an inverted pyramid suspended from the three corners. As of 2023, the tower is the eighth-tallest skyscraper in Frankfurt and also in Germany.

The Trianon's layout is roughly the shape of an equilateral triangle, the corners of which are formed by three-sided towers. The end is an inverted three-sided pyramid on the roof. It is the first structure in Germany to use high-strength concrete.

== Ownership ==
In 2007, DekaBank sold the building to the Morgan Stanley European Office Fund (MSEOF). A 57% interest in the building was later transferred to the real estate investment fund Morgan Stanley P2 Value.

In June 2015, Morgan Stanley and Madison Real Estate sold the building to the US investor NorthStar Reality Europe for the equivalent of US$540 million. In November 2018 NorthStar Reality Europe sold Trianon to the South Korean financial consortium IGIS Asset Management and Hana Financial Investment for US$758 million.

In June 2024, Trianon's owner Geschaeftshaus am Gendarmenmarkt filed for insolvency in a Frankfurt court.

== Gallery ==
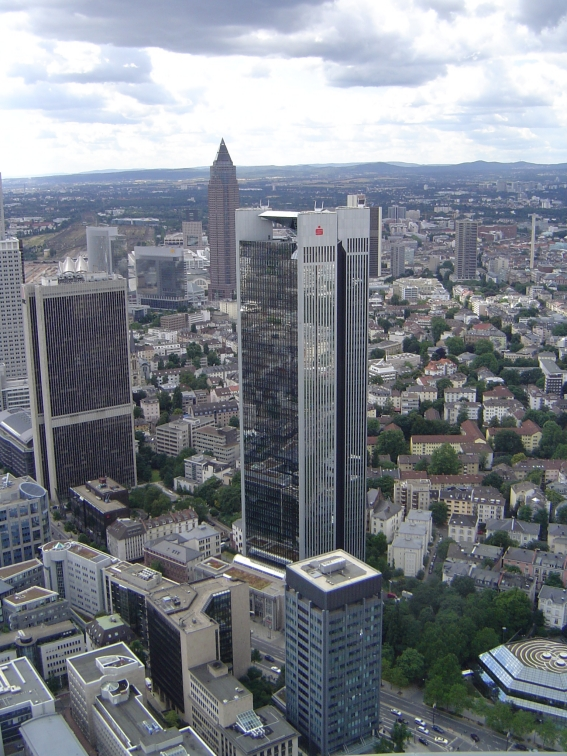
Trianon as seen from Main Tower

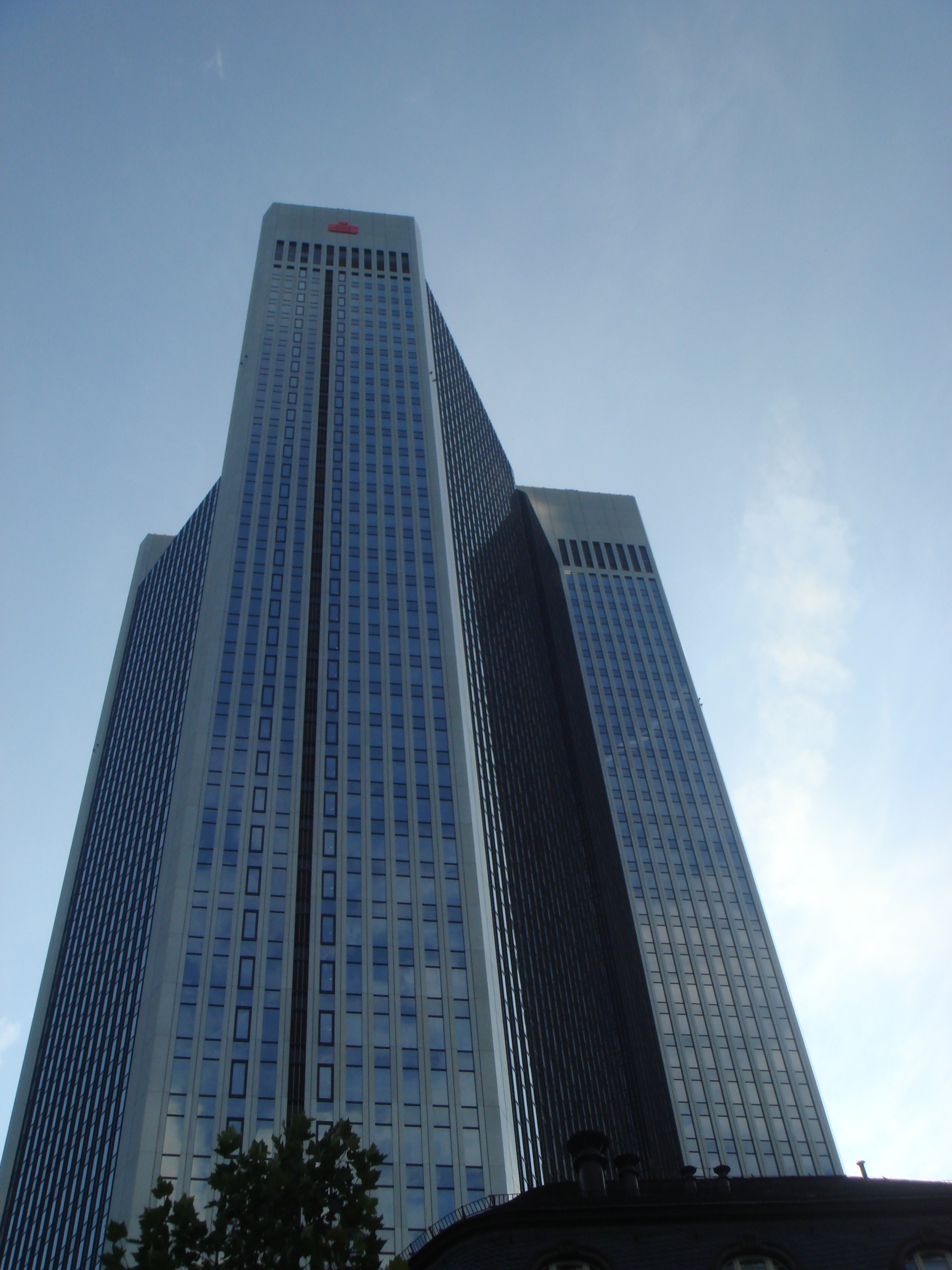
View from the base

== See also ==
- List of tallest buildings in Frankfurt
- List of tallest buildings in Germany
- List of tallest buildings in Europe
