= Millennium Hilton Seoul =

Hotel in Seoul, South Korea

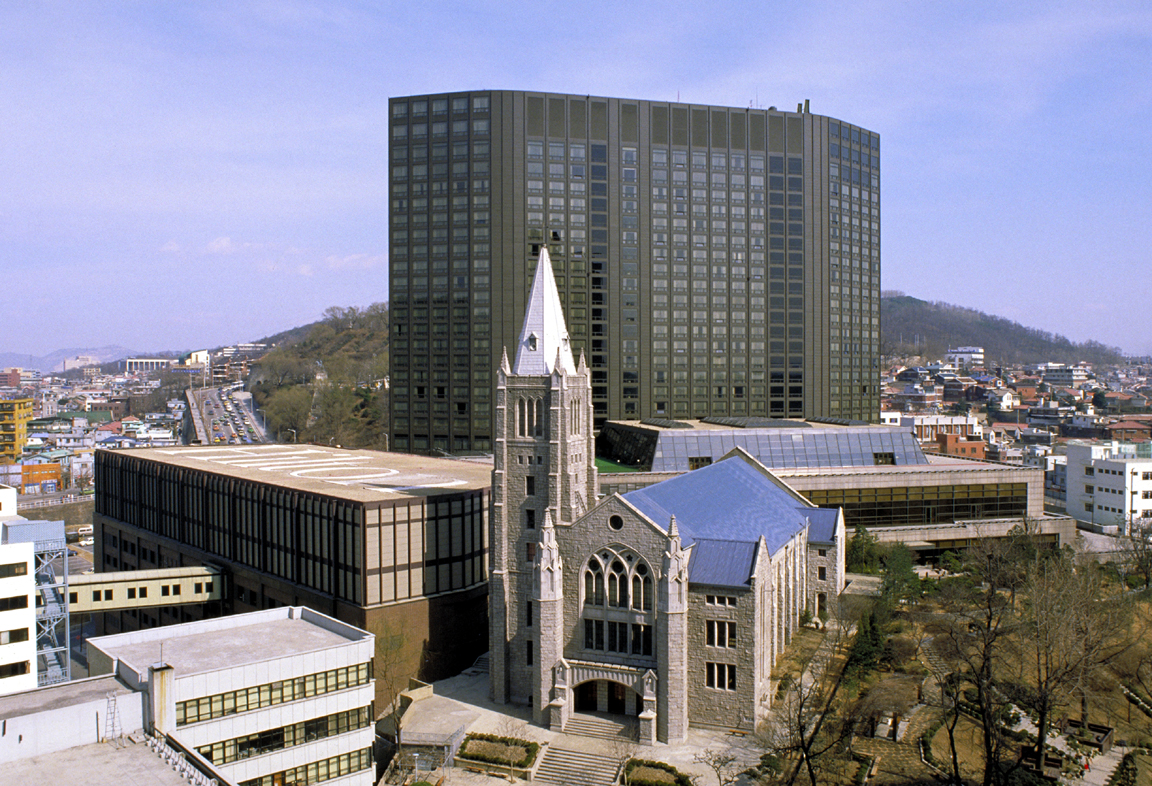
- Seoul Hilton in 1983

- Location within South Korea
- Hotel chain: Hilton Hotels & Resorts

General information
- Type: Hotel
- Location: 50 Sowol-ro, Jung-gu, Seoul, South Korea
- Coordinates: 37.555408°N 126.975538°E
- Opened: December 7, 1983
- Closed: December 31, 2022
- Owner: Millennium & Copthorne Hotels; Hilton Hotels & Resorts

Technical details
- Floor count: 24

Design and construction
- Architect: Khatib & Alami

Other information
- Number of rooms: 680

Website
- Official website

The Millennium Hilton Seoul was a luxury hotel in Seoul, part of Hilton Hotels & Resorts. It opened in 1983 as the Seoul Hilton and was located at 50 Sowol-ro, Jung-gu, in the central business and shopping district in downtown Seoul.

== History ==
Its opening in 1983 marked Hilton being one of the first international hotel brands to enter South Korea. The hotel was originally owned by Daewoo Group, which sold it to City Developments Limited in 1999. In December 2021, City Developments announced plans to sell the hotel and adjacent land to IGIS Asset Management, a Korean real estate firm, for 1.1 trillion won ($934 million).

The Millennium Seoul Hilton was listed in the Forbes Travel Guide.

The hotel closed on December 31, 2022 for demolition and redevelopment, and ceased to be affiliated with the Hilton brand.

Following the hotel's closure, Hyundai Engineering & Construction was contracted to redevelop the site into a high-end mixed-use complex.
