= One Bloor =

Skyscraper on Bloor Street and Yonge Street in downtown Toronto, Ontario, Canada

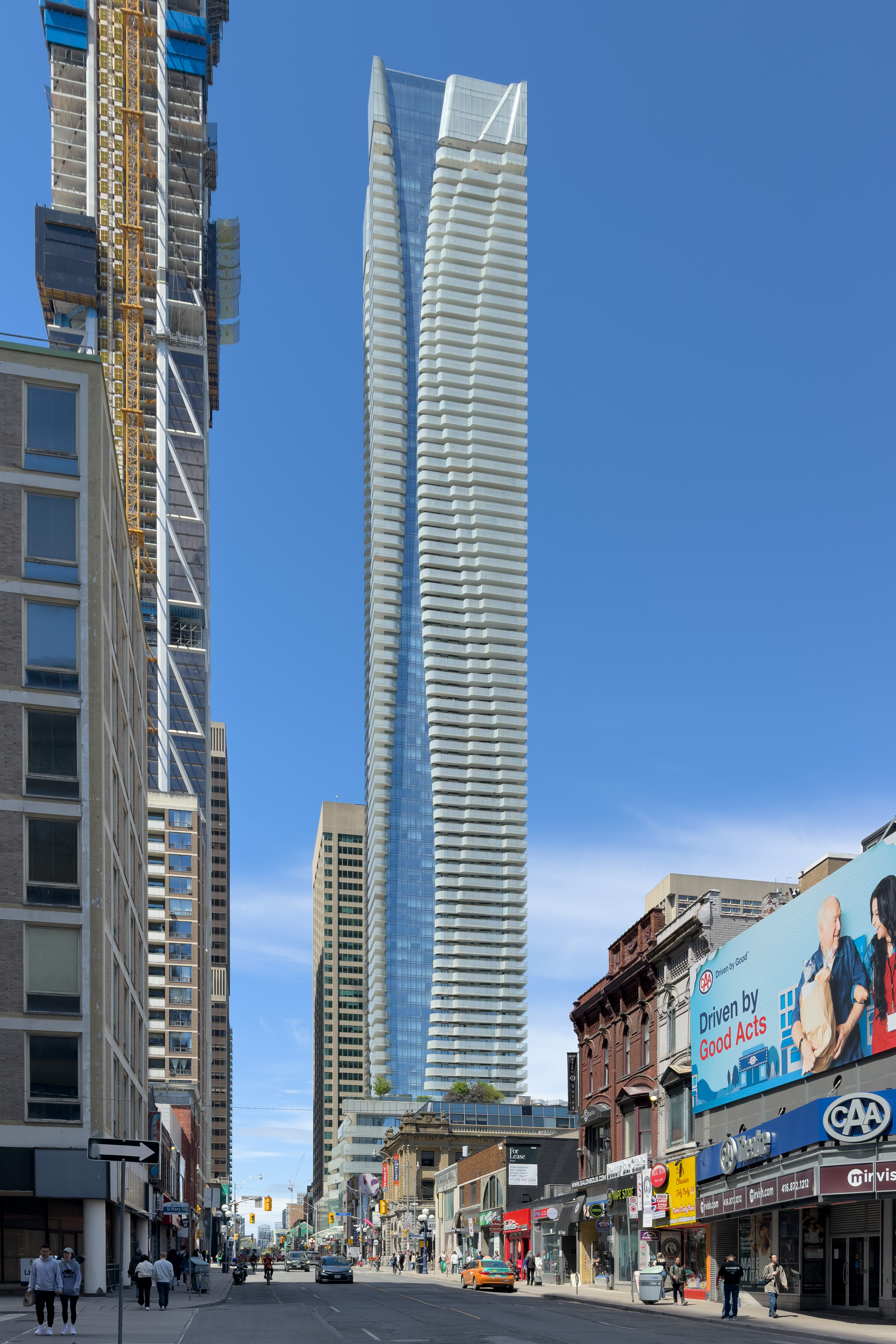
- View of the building from Yonge Street

General information
- Status: Completed
- Type: Residential and retail
- Location: 1 Bloor Street East; Toronto, Ontario
- Coordinates: 43.6702°N 79.3865°W
- Construction started: August 2011
- Topped-out: September 23, 2015
- Completed: December 2017

Height
- Roof: 257 m (843 ft)

Technical details
- Floor count: 76
- Floor area: 68,634 m^{2} (738,770 sq ft)

Design and construction
- Architecture firm: Hariri Pontarini Architects
- Developer: Great Gulf
- Structural engineer: Jablonsky, Ast and Partners
- Main contractor: Tucker Hi-Rise Construction

Other information
- Public transit: Bloor–Yonge station

One Bloor, previously One Bloor East and Number One Bloor, is a mixed-use skyscraper at the intersection of Bloor Street and Yonge Street in downtown Toronto, Ontario, Canada. The project was initially launched by developer Bazis International Inc. in 2007, before being cancelled and re-developed by Great Gulf. As of 2018, it is the tenth-tallest residential building outside Asia and the 40th tallest residential building in the world.

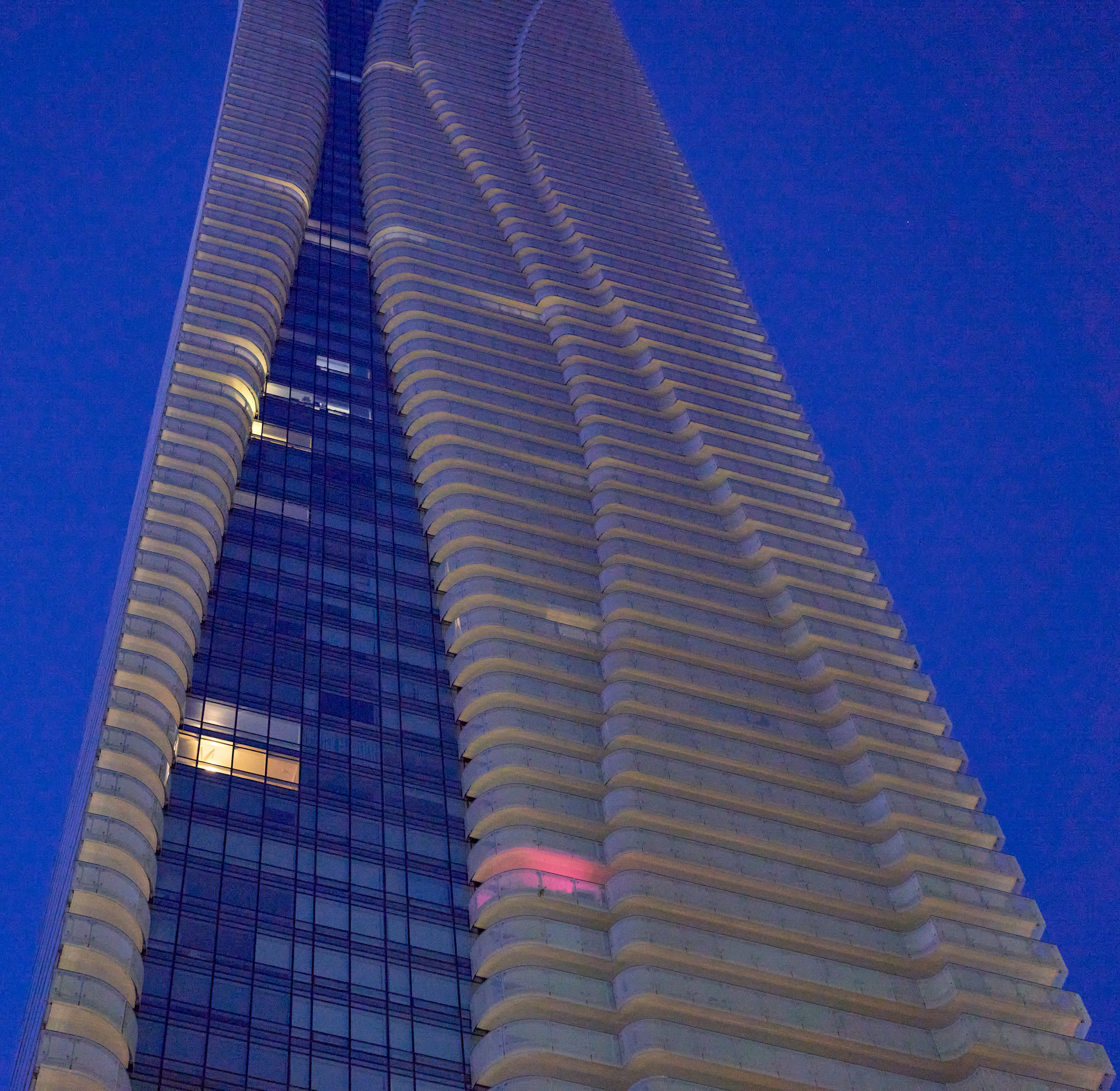
An early morning photo of One Bloor

== History ==
There were several attempts to build a residential building at No. 1 Bloor Street East. In 2005, a 60-storey tower was proposed by Young and Wright. The site was sold to Bazis International and then to Great Gulf Homes. The site was formerly a two storey retail building with a Harvey's and City Optical on the ground floor, which was demolished once the One Bloor project proceeded.

=== Bazis proposal ===
In 2007, an 80-storey proposal was announced with much fanfare by Bazis International. The existing two-storey buildings located on the site were demolished in December 2008.

It was to be approximately 275 metres (902 ft) tall and was designed by Rosario Varacalli. The proposal called for a semi-transparent metal and glass tower with environmentally friendly and efficient technology. The building planned to include 189 hotel rooms and 612 condominium units.

In July 2009, both the final scope and the eventual fate of the project were called into question. News reports stated that the height would be reduced to 67 storeys to reduce the construction costs. The Toronto Star also reported that a group of lenders sought to have their $46 million loan be repaid, or that the court allow them to buy the vacant land. The lenders reportedly made a failed bid of $50.5 million to Bazis for the land. Bazis purchased the site for $63 million in 2007, and cited the global lending crisis as a reason for the height reduction and the loan being in default.

=== Sale to Great Gulf ===
On July 22, 2009, the Toronto Star reported that Bazis had sold the property to privately held Great Gulf, who have expressed interest in building a skyscraper on the site. The Bazis proposal died as a result of the sale. Great Gulf relaunched the plans to build a condo tower there with a new design, reduced height (initially 91 to 80, but then 80 floors to 65), and a new name. Buoyed by strong sales, One Bloor grew from the downsized 65 floors to 70 floors and again to 75 floors. The skyscraper's final height is 257 metres (843 ft), making it the second tallest residential tower in Canada, after nearby Aura.

The building is designed by Hariri Pontarini Architects, overseen by David Pontarini. Number One Bloor features over 2,500 m^{2} (27,000 sq ft) of resort-inspired amenities on the sixth and seventh floors designed by Cecconi Simone. On the seventh floor terrace, there is 1,800 m^{2} (19,000 sq ft) of outdoor amenity space designed by Janet Rosenberg & Studio, Landscape Architecture/Urban Design. The six-storey podium includes 9,300 m^{2} (100,000 sq ft) of retail space. One major tenant, the Seattle-based Nordstrom Rack chain opened a 3,700 m^{2} (40,000 sq ft) store in May 2018 and closed it in May 2023. It was the chain's first Canadian location.

=== Chick-fil-A controversy ===
American chicken sandwich chain Chick-fil-A opened its first standalone Canadian location at street level on September 6, 2019 amid protests over the homophobic beliefs held by the evangelical owner of the restaurant chain and donations to anti-LGBT organizations, (Note: According to American civil rights organization Southern Poverty Law Center's definition of anti-LGBT organizations) especially given the location's proximity to Toronto's main LGBT community of Church and Wellesley.

== Construction ==
The final scheme comprises a 76-storey condominium tower built by Great Gulf. The two-storey buildings located on the site were demolished in December 2008. Construction began in August 2011, and the tower topped out in late 2015.

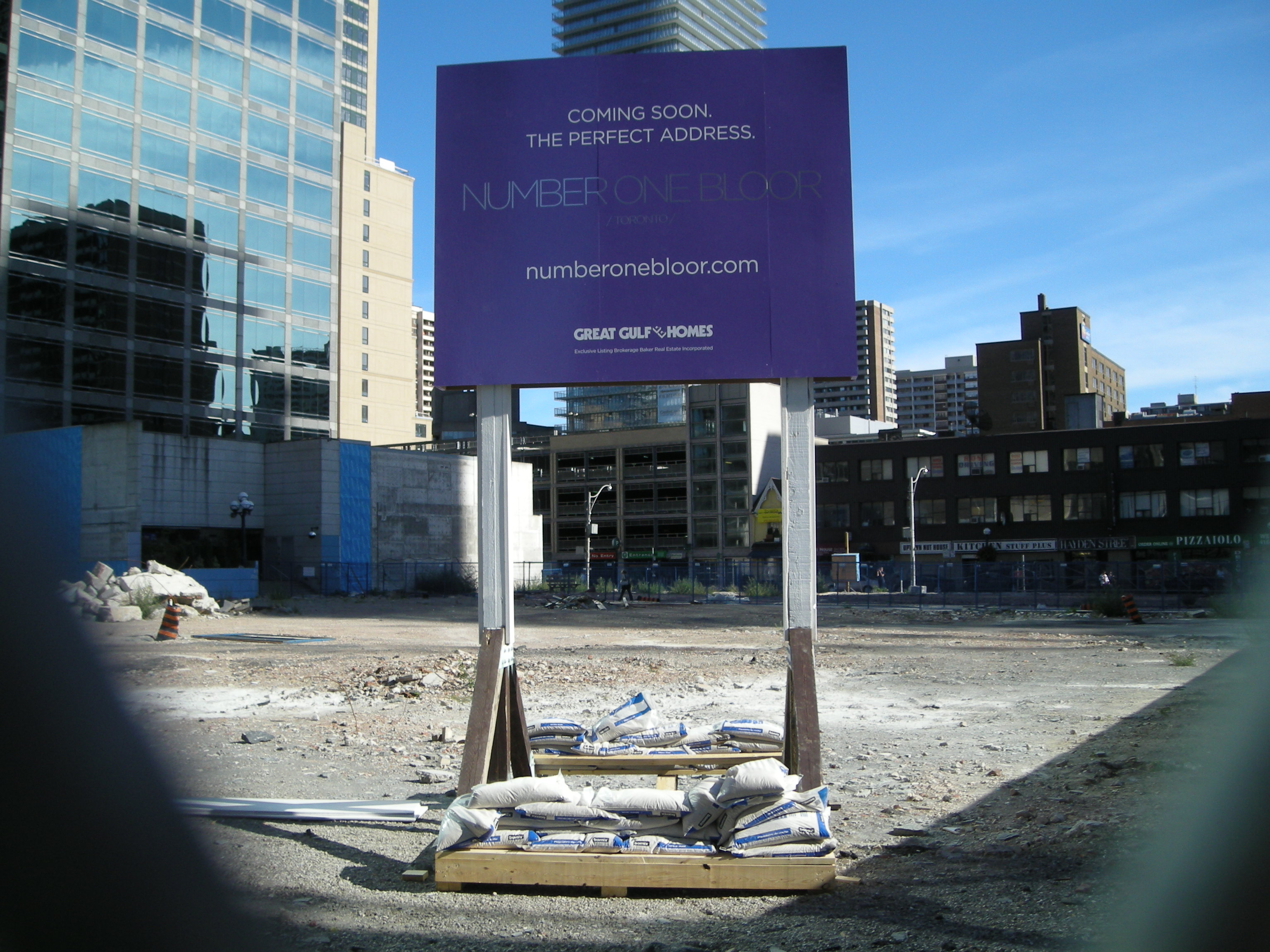
One Bloor site, September 2009

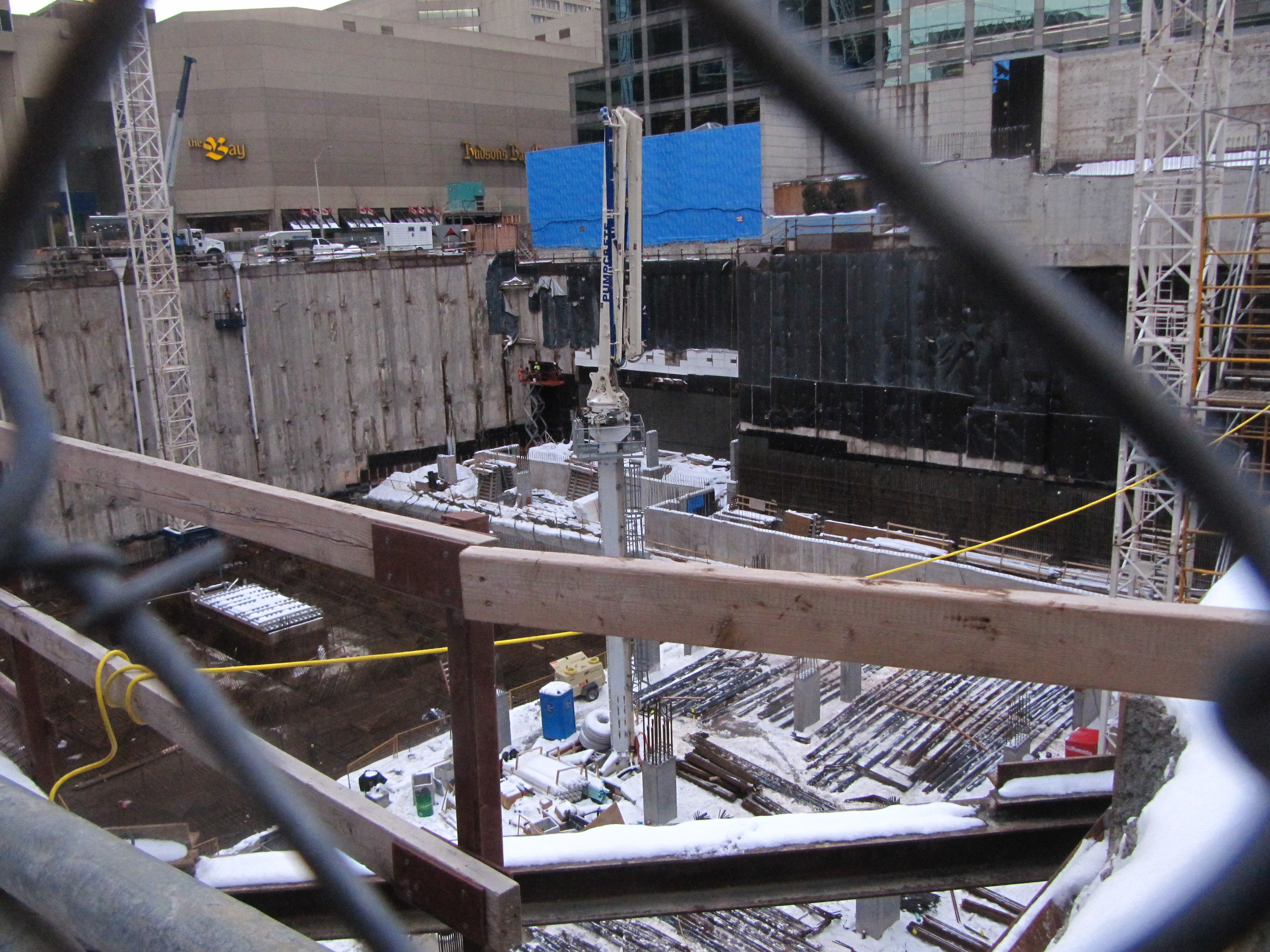
Foundations of One Bloor in January 2013

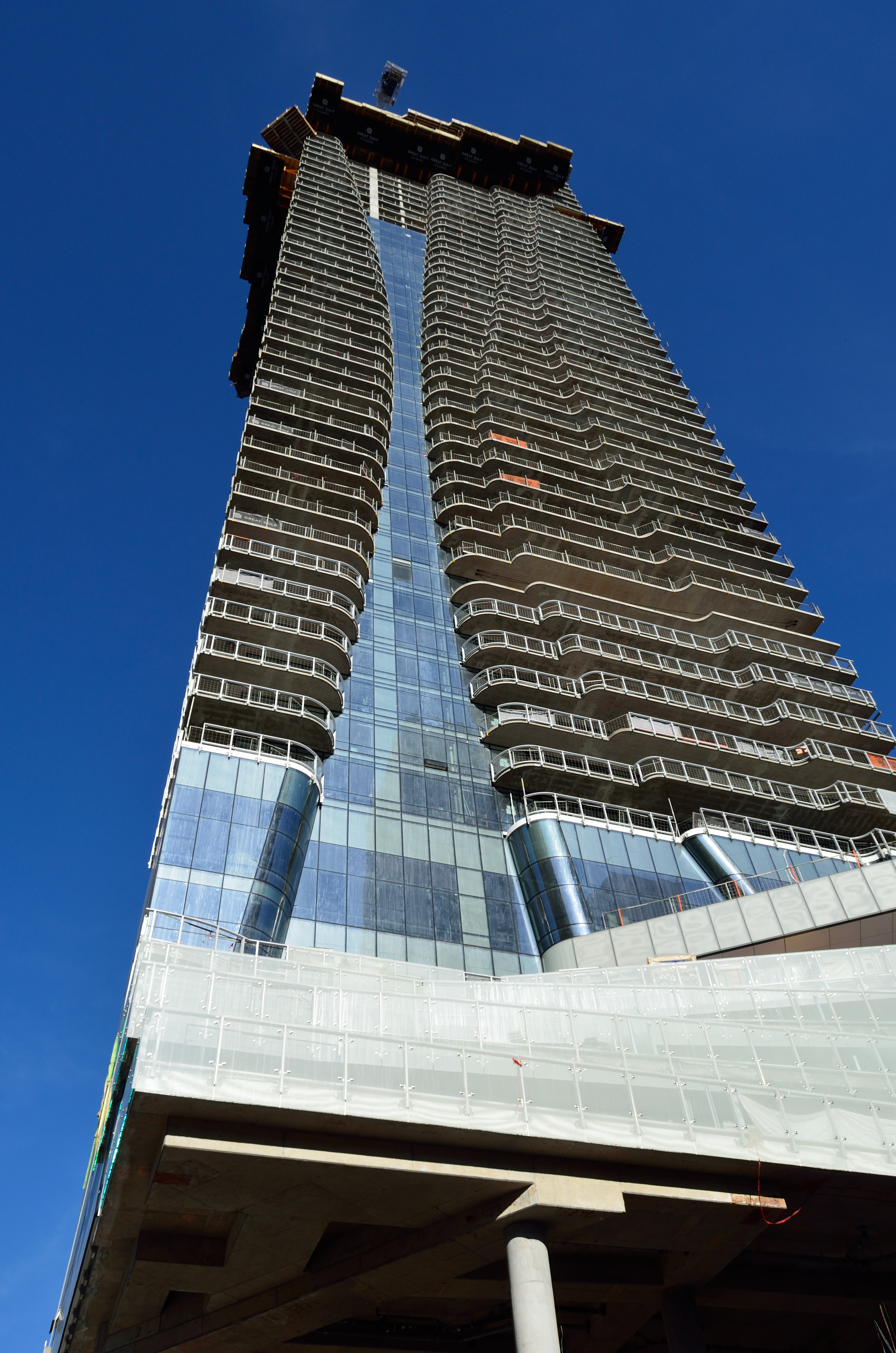
One Bloor construction site in April 2015

== See also ==
- List of tallest buildings in Toronto
- The One – supertall tower being developed across the street from One Bloor, at 1 Bloor W.
- 2 Bloor East
- Two Bloor West
