= First Canadian Place =

Skyscraper in Toronto, Ontario

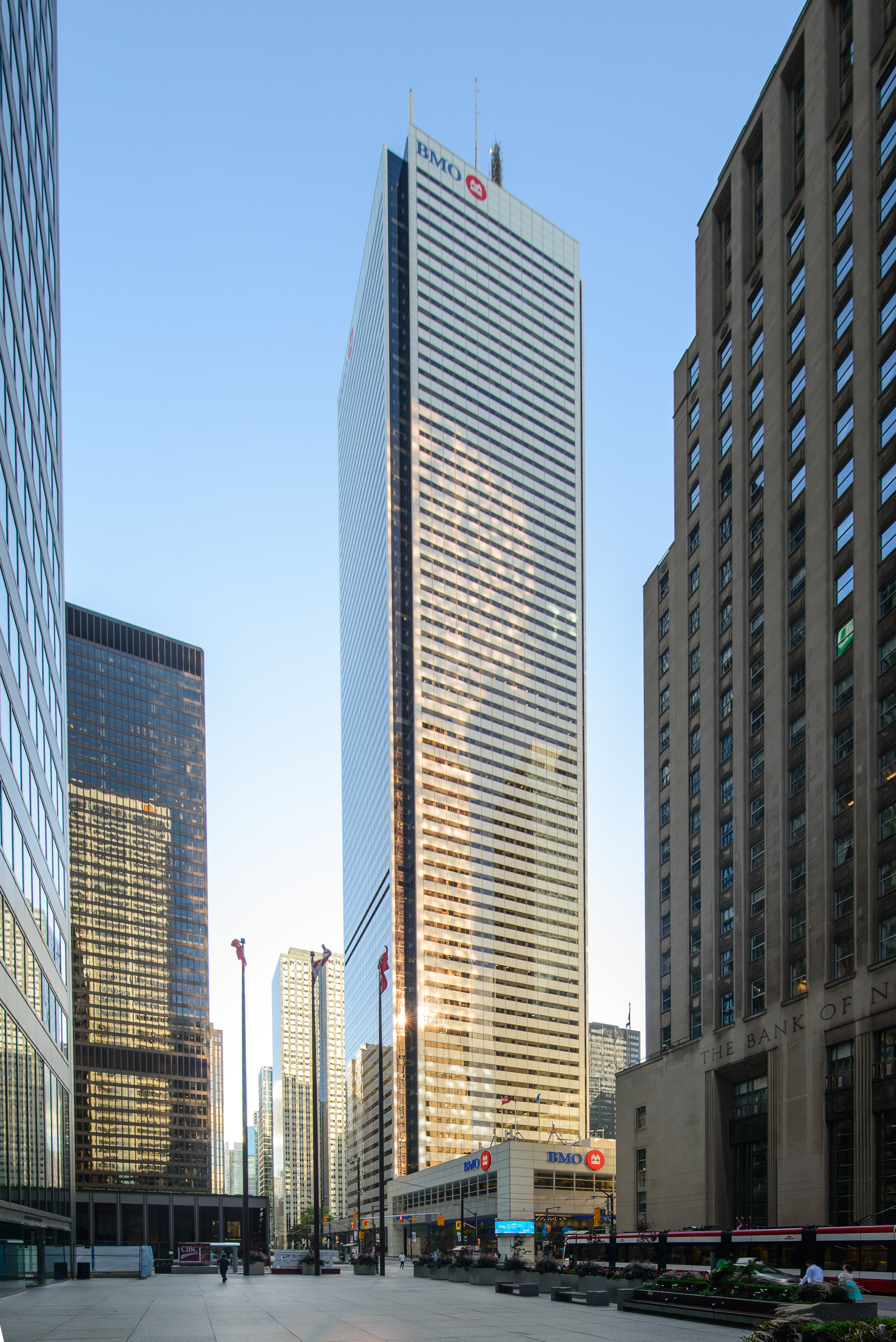
- First Canadian Place in 2017
- Alternative names: FCP

Record height
- Tallest in Canada from 1975 to 2025^{[I]}
- Preceded by: Commerce Court West
- Surpassed by: One Bloor West

General information
- Type: Commercial offices
- Location: 100 King Street West; Toronto, Ontario, Canada
- Coordinates: 43°38′55.6″N 79°22′54.1″W
- Completed: 5 June 1975
- Owner: Manulife Financial Corporation (50%), CPP (50%)
- Operator: Brookfield Properties

Height
- Architectural: 298.1 m (978 ft)
- Tip: 355 m (1,165 ft)
- Top floor: 289.9 m (951 ft)

Technical details
- Floor count: 72; 4 below ground
- Floor area: 250,849 m^{2} (2,700,120 sq ft)
- Lifts/elevators: 61

Design and construction
- Architects: Bregman + Hamann Architects; Edward Durell Stone & Associates
- Developer: Olympia and York
- Main contractor: EllisDon Corporation

Website
- fcpex.ca

First Canadian Place is a commercial skyscraper in the Financial District of Toronto, Ontario, at the northwest corner of King and Bay streets, and serves as the global operational executive office of the Bank of Montreal. At 298 metres (978 ft) tall, it is the third-tallest building in Canada, the 35th-tallest building in North America, and the 261st-tallest in the world. From its completion in 1975 until 2025, it held the title of being the tallest building in Canada. It is also the fourth-tallest free-standing structure in Canada, after the CN Tower (also in Toronto), the Inco Superstack chimney (projected to be demolished) in Sudbury, and The One (also in Toronto). It was Canada's tallest building from 1975 until June 2025, when it was surpassed by The One. The building is jointly owned by Manulife Financial Corporation (50%) and a private consortium of investors including CPP Investments. The building is managed by Brookfield Properties.

== History and architecture ==
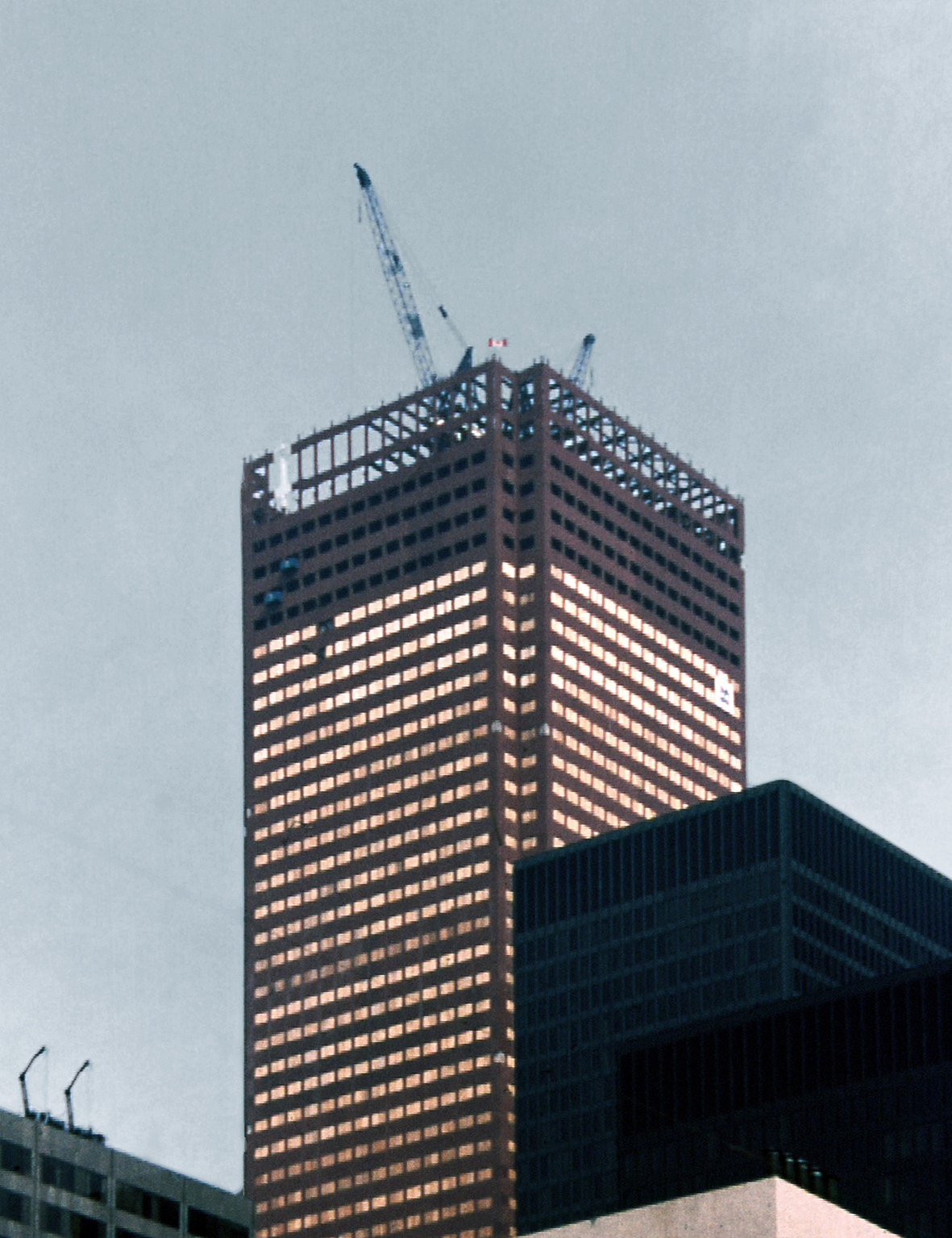
First Canadian Place under construction in 1975

First Canadian Place is named for Canada's first bank, the Bank of Montreal. The main building in the complex was intended to be known as "First Bank Tower". Designed by B+H Architects with Edward Durell Stone as a design consultant, construction was completed in 1975.

The tower and associated buildings occupy a block once home to two major newspapers, the Toronto Star's Toronto Star Building and The Globe and Mail's William H. Wright Building. The site was the last of the corners at King and Bay to be redeveloped in the 1960s and 1970s, and a major bidding war began over the property. The then-little-known firm of Olympia and York eventually obtained nearly the whole city block, but the election of reformist mayor David Crombie led to new rules banning skyscrapers. It took three years of lobbying before permission for First Canadian Place was granted. When completed, the building was nearly identical in appearance to Stone's Standard Oil Building in Chicago, Illinois; completed two years previous, the Chicago tower is of the same floor plan and clad in the same marble, the only overtly visible difference being the vertical orientation of the windows, as opposed to the horizontal run of those on First Canadian Place.

First Canadian Place was the 6th tallest building in the world to structural top (currently 103rd) and the tallest building overall outside of Chicago and New York when completed in 1975. It was also the tallest building in the Commonwealth of Nations until the completion of the Petronas Towers in Kuala Lumpur, Malaysia, in 1998. The Bank of Montreal "M-bar" logo at the top of the building was the highest sign in the world from 1975 until overtaken by the sign atop CITIC Plaza, in Guangzhou, China, in 1997. The roof is still the location of a number of antennas used for radio and television broadcasting. The structure contains 29 elevators, and is one of only a few buildings in the world that uses the double-decked variety, and is connected to the underground PATH system.

The building was pictured on the front and rear cover of the 1981 album This Is the Ice Age by Canadian New Wave band Martha and the Muffins and also their 7" single "Women Around the World at Work". The album featured two photos which were taken from the same place but at different times by Muffins guitarist Mark Gane using a time-lapse camera and features the building at midday and dusk. The 7" cover again features the same photo but has 9 small images taken at various times of the day and night.

=== Cladding ===
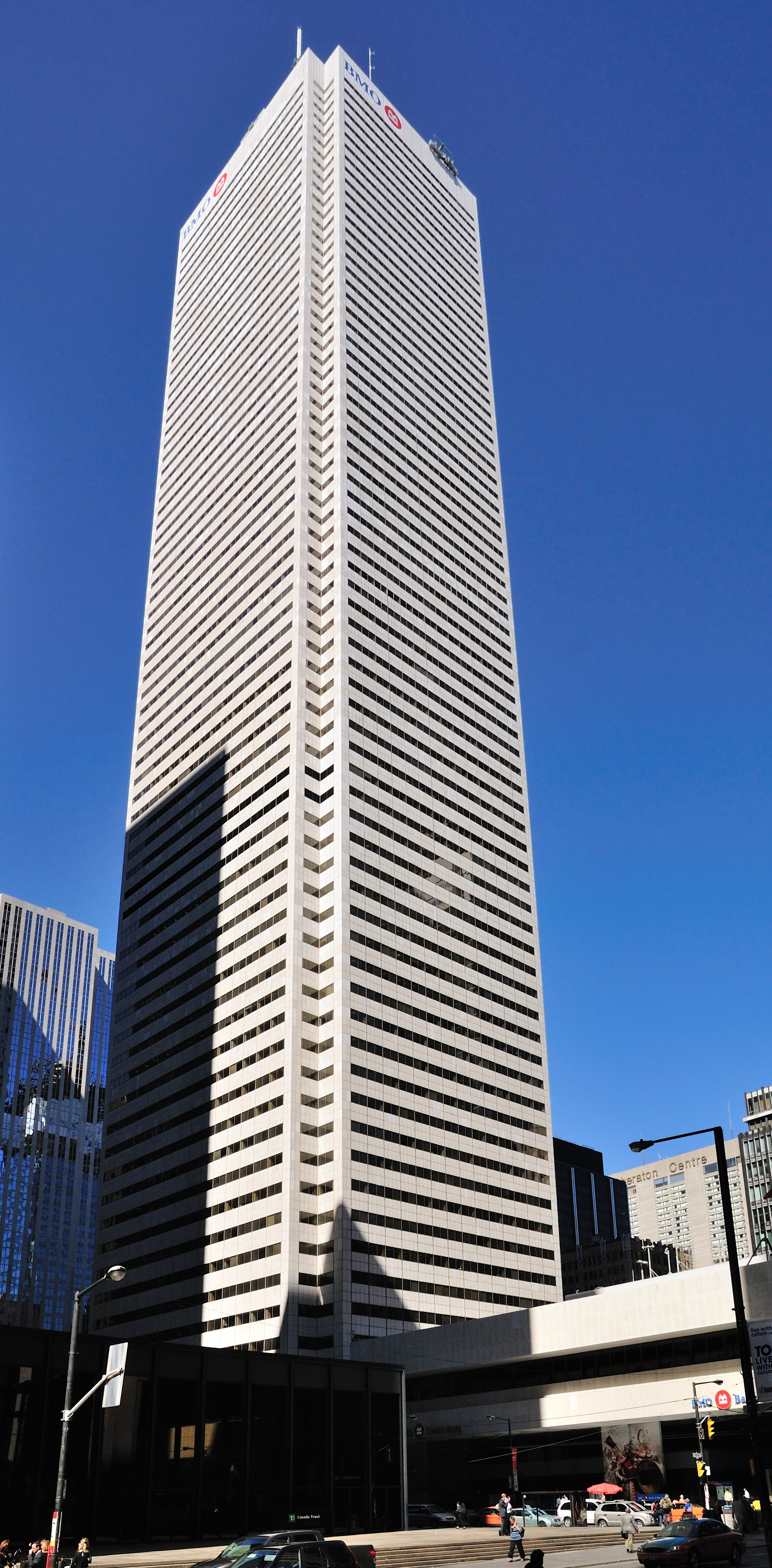
FCP in 2008 prior to recladding

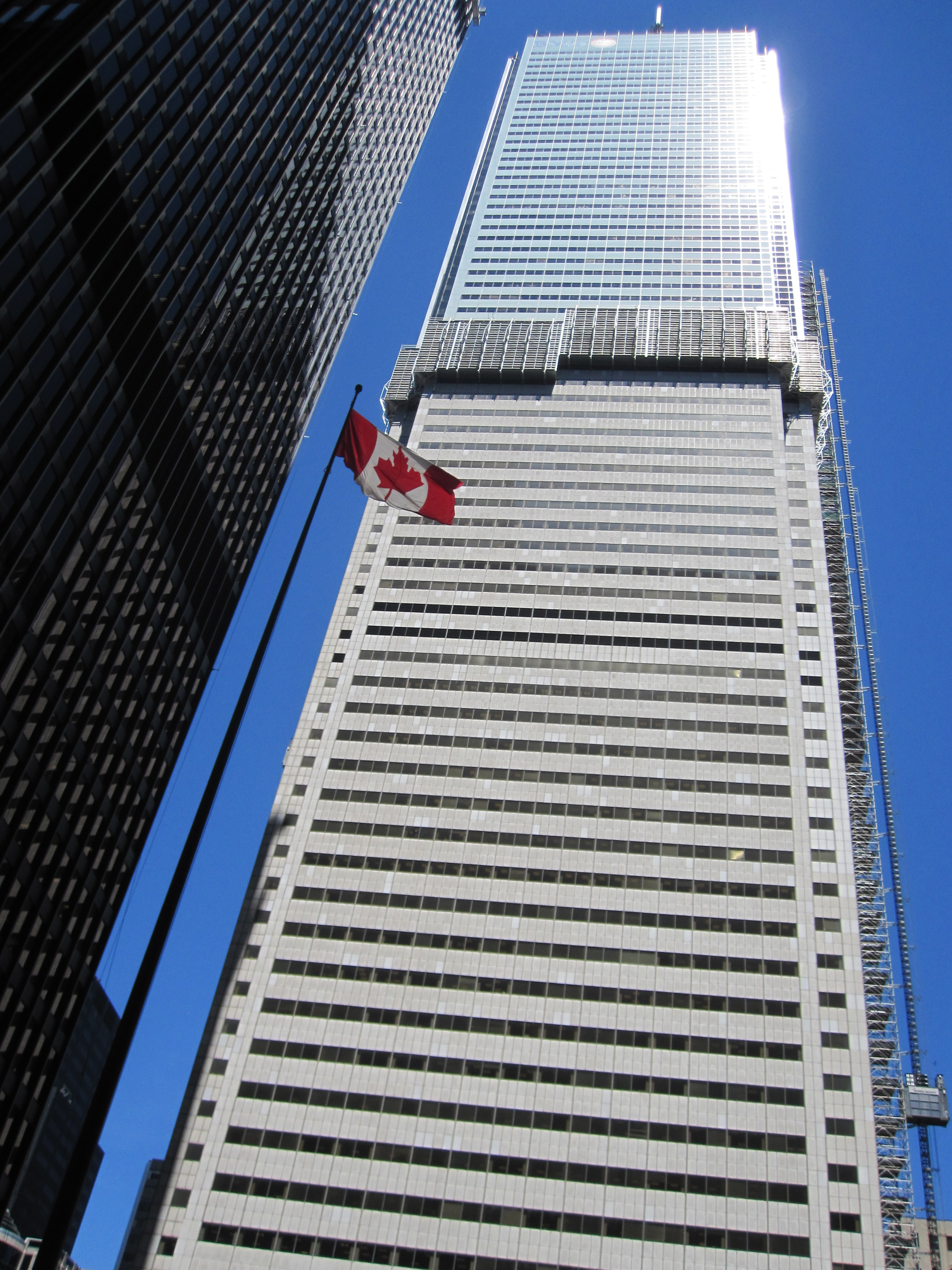
New cladding being installed in 2011

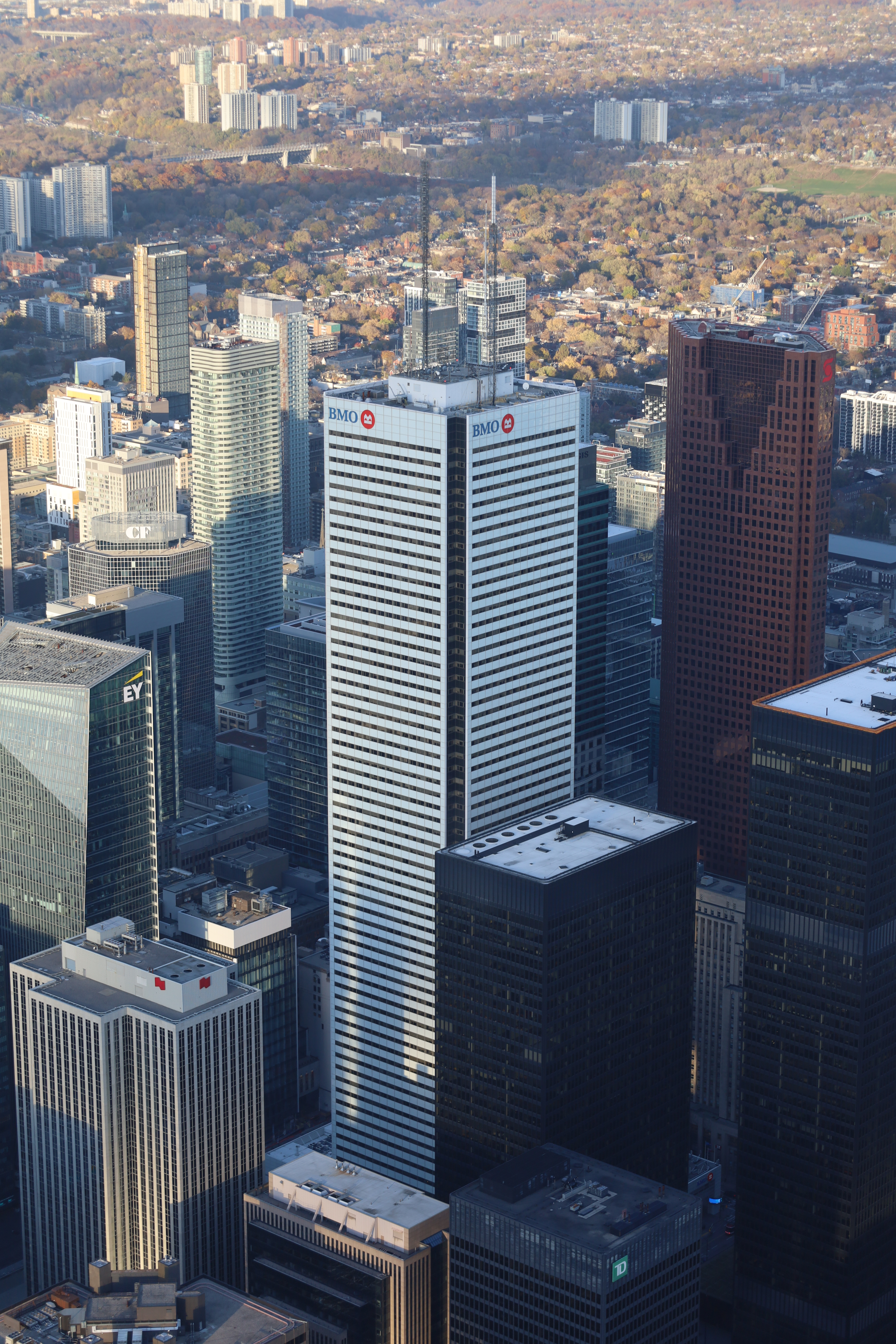
View from the CN Tower SkyPod in 2023

The same white Carrara marble used on Stone's Aon Center (in Chicago) was employed as an exterior cladding and interior finish for First Canadian Place, with approximately 45,000 marble panels weighing around 200 to 300 pounds (91 to 136 kg) each. Foreshadowing what would take place with First Canadian Place in 2007, one of the marble slabs of Aon Center, when it was named the Standard Oil Building, detached in 1974, falling and penetrating the roof of a neighbouring building, resulting in an eventual recladding of the entire Aon Center in white granite between 1992 and 1994. This problem would surface at First Canadian Place as well, during an intense storm on the evening of 15 May 2007, a 1-by-1.2-metre (3.3 by 3.9 ft), 310-pound (140 kg) white marble panel fell from the 60th storey of the tower's southern face onto the 3rd-floor mezzanine roof below, causing authorities to close surrounding streets as a precaution.

In late 2009, owner Brookfield Properties announced it would follow the example of Aon Center and, over three years, replace the tower's 45,000 marble panels with new ones in glass, those on the main expanses with a white ceramic frit and the corners in a bronze tint. Brookfield and the co-owners also launched a multi-faceted rejuvenation program, including "upgrades to the building's mechanical, electrical, and lighting systems that will redefine the standard for enhanced performance, comfort, and greening". FCP's common areas including upper and lower level entrance and elevator lobbies, the retail concourse and Market Place were to also undergo renovation, with new natural stone flooring, fritted glass accents, brushed metal handrails, landscaping, and water features. The rejuvenation program design architects were Moed de Armas & Shannon Architects and Bregman + Hamann Architects were the architects of record. The entire project, completed in 2012, cost was in excess of CA$100 million, paid by the owner. This extensive capital improvement project was intended to provide a new exterior for FCP and eliminate the maintenance costs associated with marble upkeep.

== Tenants ==
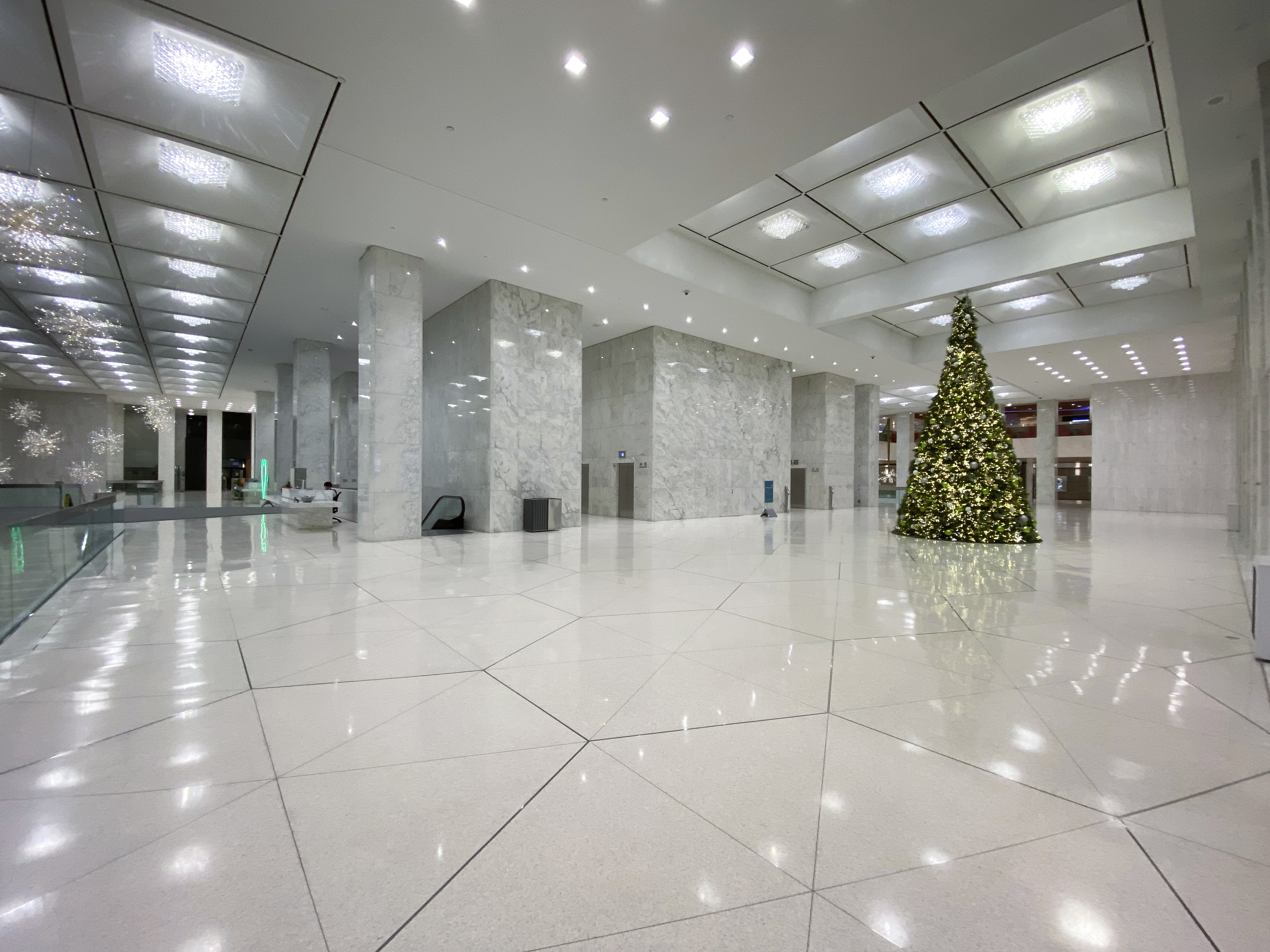
The office lobby in 2021

- Bank of Montreal
- Osler, Hoskin & Harcourt
- DLA Piper
- Bennett Jones
- Gowling WLG

=== Broadcasting ===
The following Toronto-area broadcasters have their transmitters atop First Canadian Place:

FM stations

- CIND-FM 88.1 (Indie 88)
- CKLN-FM 88.1 (The first radio station to use this transmitter tower. Now defunct.)
- CIRV-FM 88.9
- CIUT-FM 89.5
- CJBC-FM 90.3 (Radio-Canada Espace Musique)
- CKIS-FM 92.5 (Kiss 92.5)
- CFXJ-FM 93.5 (93.5 The Move)
- CJKX-FM-2 95.9 (KX96) +
- CFMZ-FM 96.3 (Classical 96)
- CFZM-1-FM 96.7 (AM740) *
- CKFG-FM 98.7 (G 98.7)
- CBLA-FM 99.1 (CBC Radio One)
- CJSA-FM 101.3 (CMR Diversity FM)
- CFNY-FM 102.1 (102.1 The Edge) #
- CFPT-FM 106.5 (First Peoples Radio)
- CILQ-FM 107.1 (Q107) #

# backup transmitter; main transmitter on CN Tower
+ synchronous transmitter; provides supplementary coverage to primary transmitter in Ajax
* fill-in transmitter; serves downtown core and surrounding inner-city neighbourhoods

In addition, an amateur radio digital mobile radio repeater for the Greater Toronto area (VA3XPR) has its antennas mounted just above the broadcast antennas on the radio mast. There are also other analogue ham repeaters on the building.

=== Shopping mall ===
According to the First Canadian Place website, the lower floors of the building, as part of the Toronto Path system, feature:

- 120 stores in three floors of Carrara marble
- 6 restaurants
- over 30 eateries
- medical centre, featuring an optometrist's office and dental clinics
- spas, beauty salons, and a barbershop
- banking and financial planning services from the Bank of Montreal
- dry cleaning and shoe repair
- post office
- FedEx and UPS dropbox
- a parkette on King Street, between the FCP and the Exchange Tower

== Gallery ==
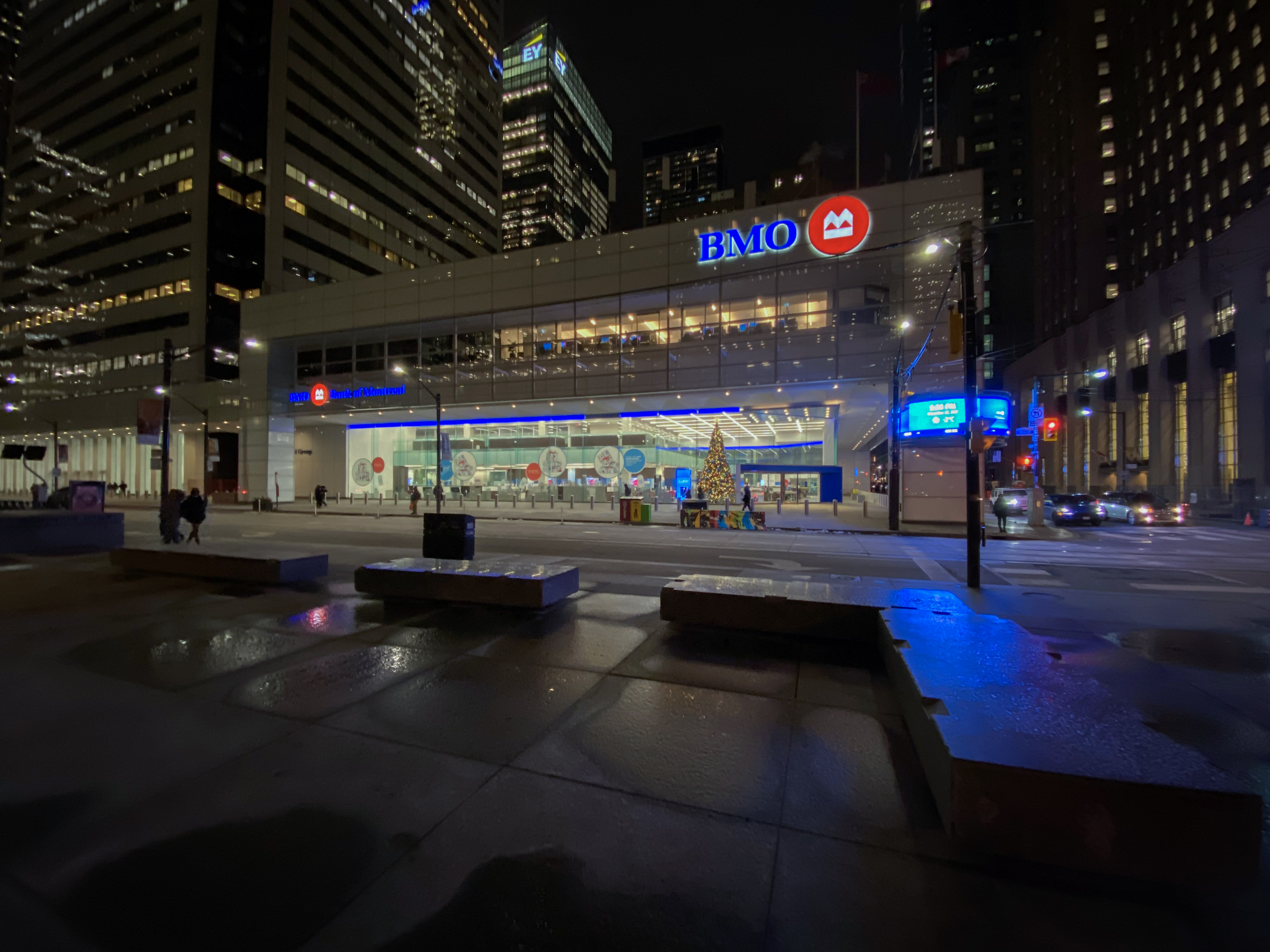
The building podium at the northwest corner of King and Bay streets

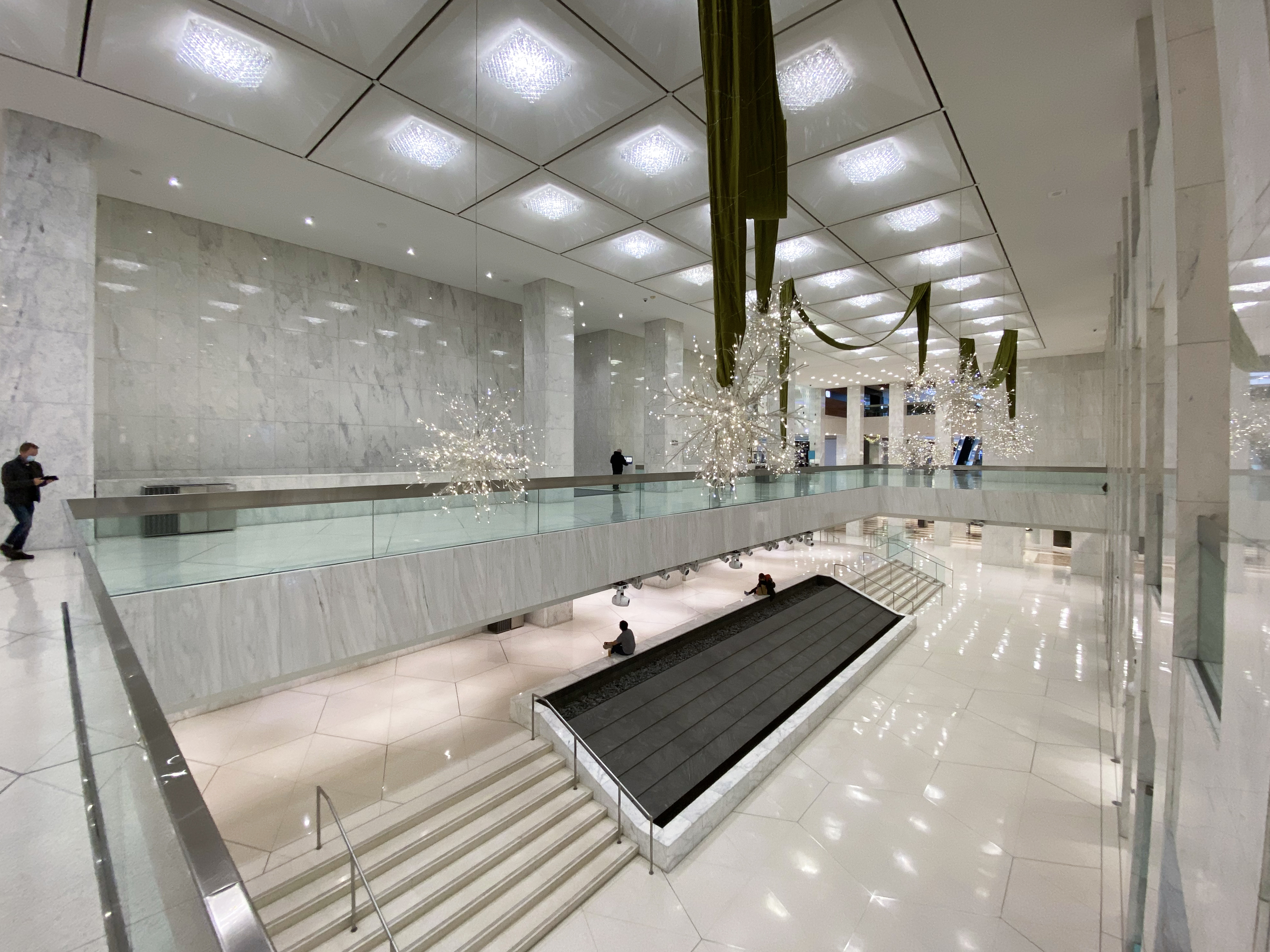
Fountain inside the building

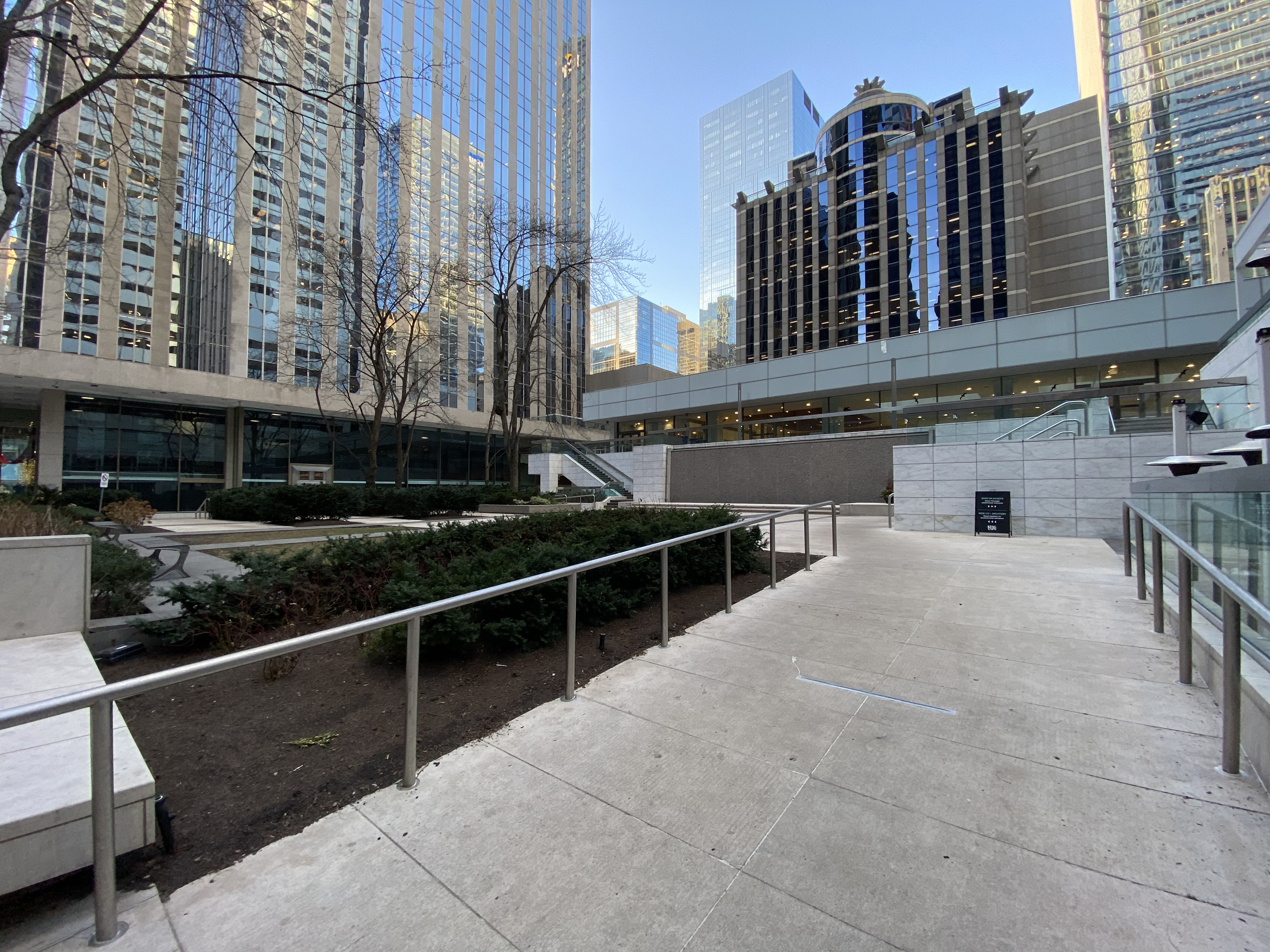
Open space

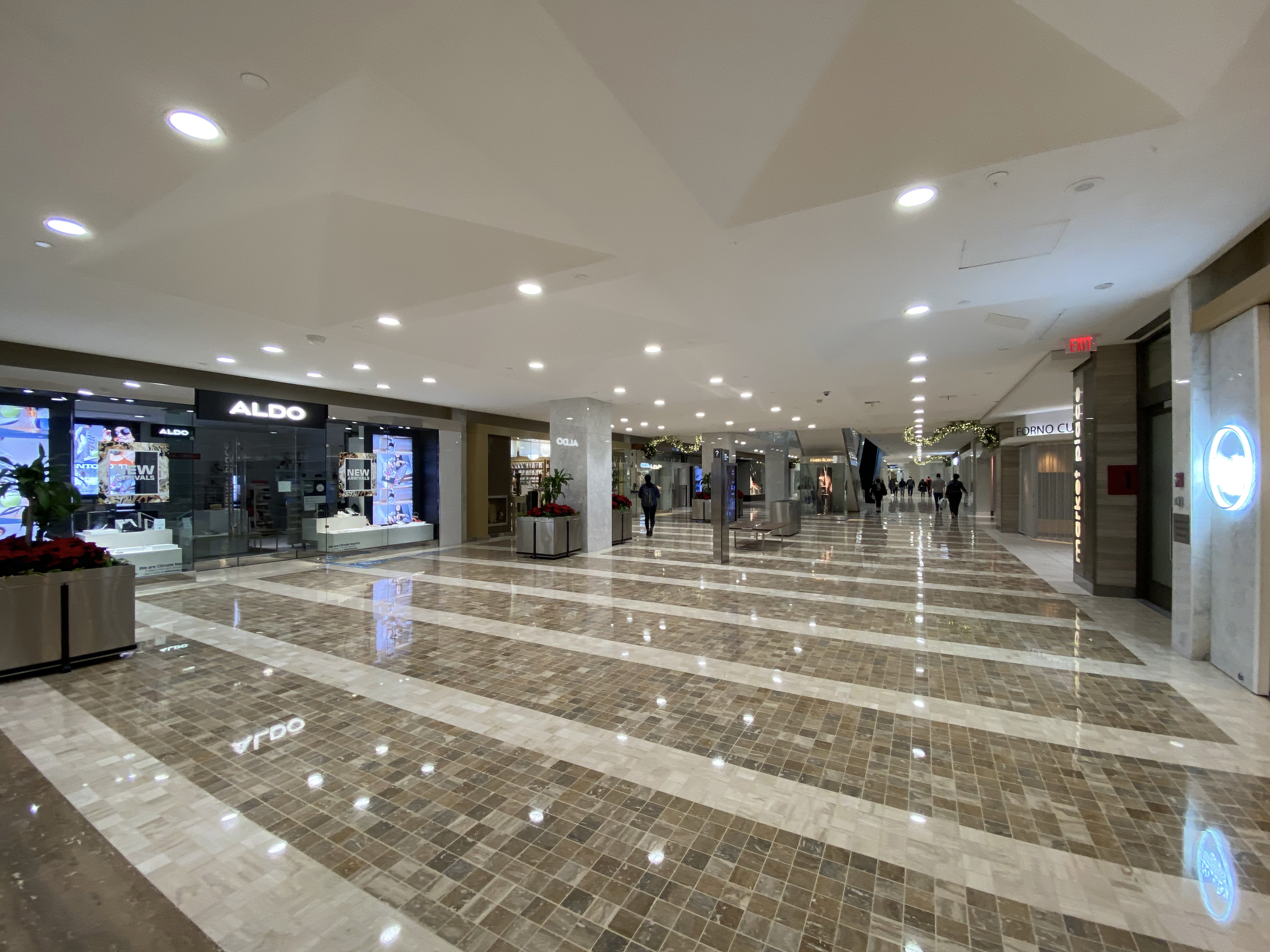
Basement Access

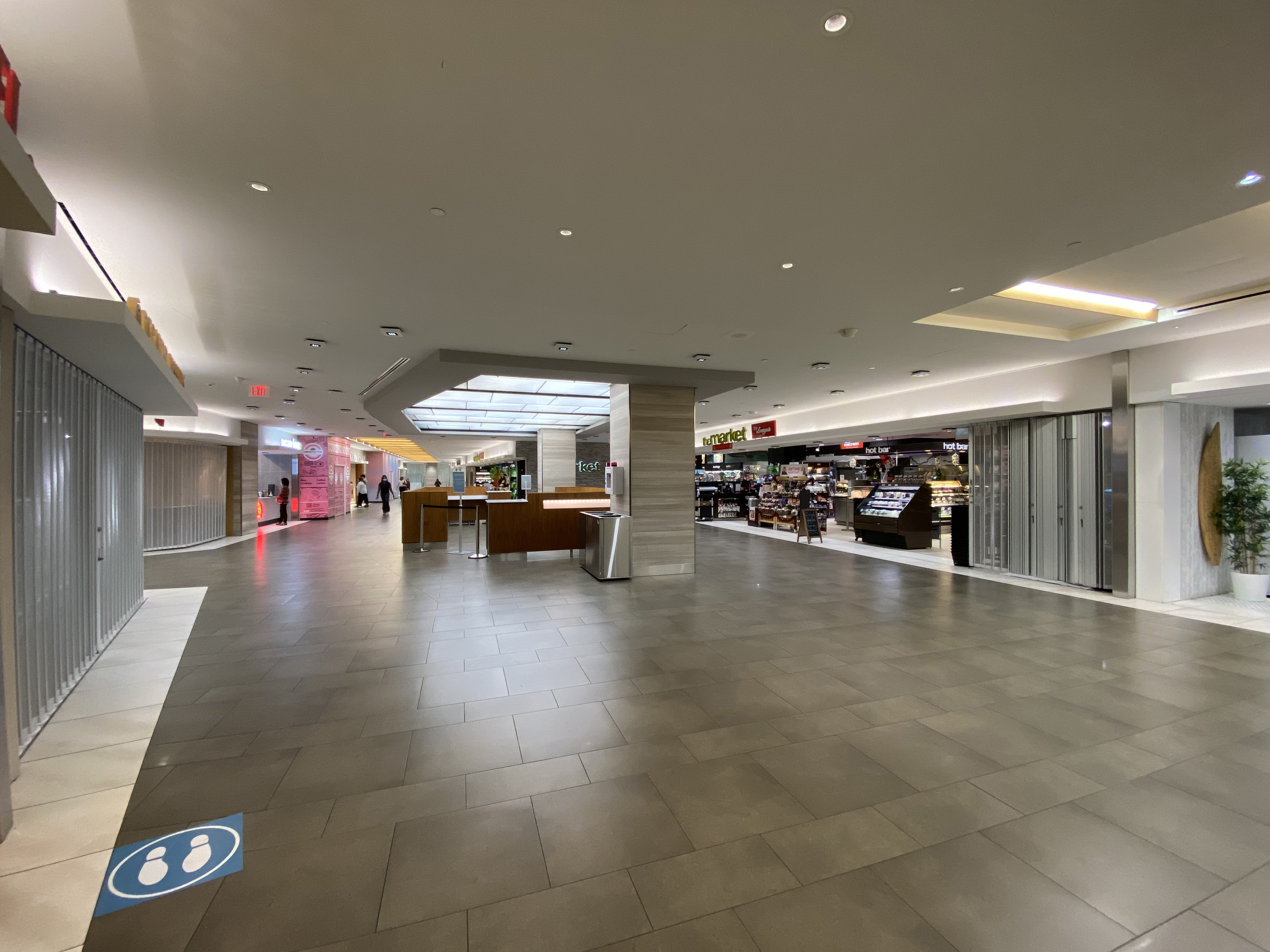
Basement supermarket and food stall

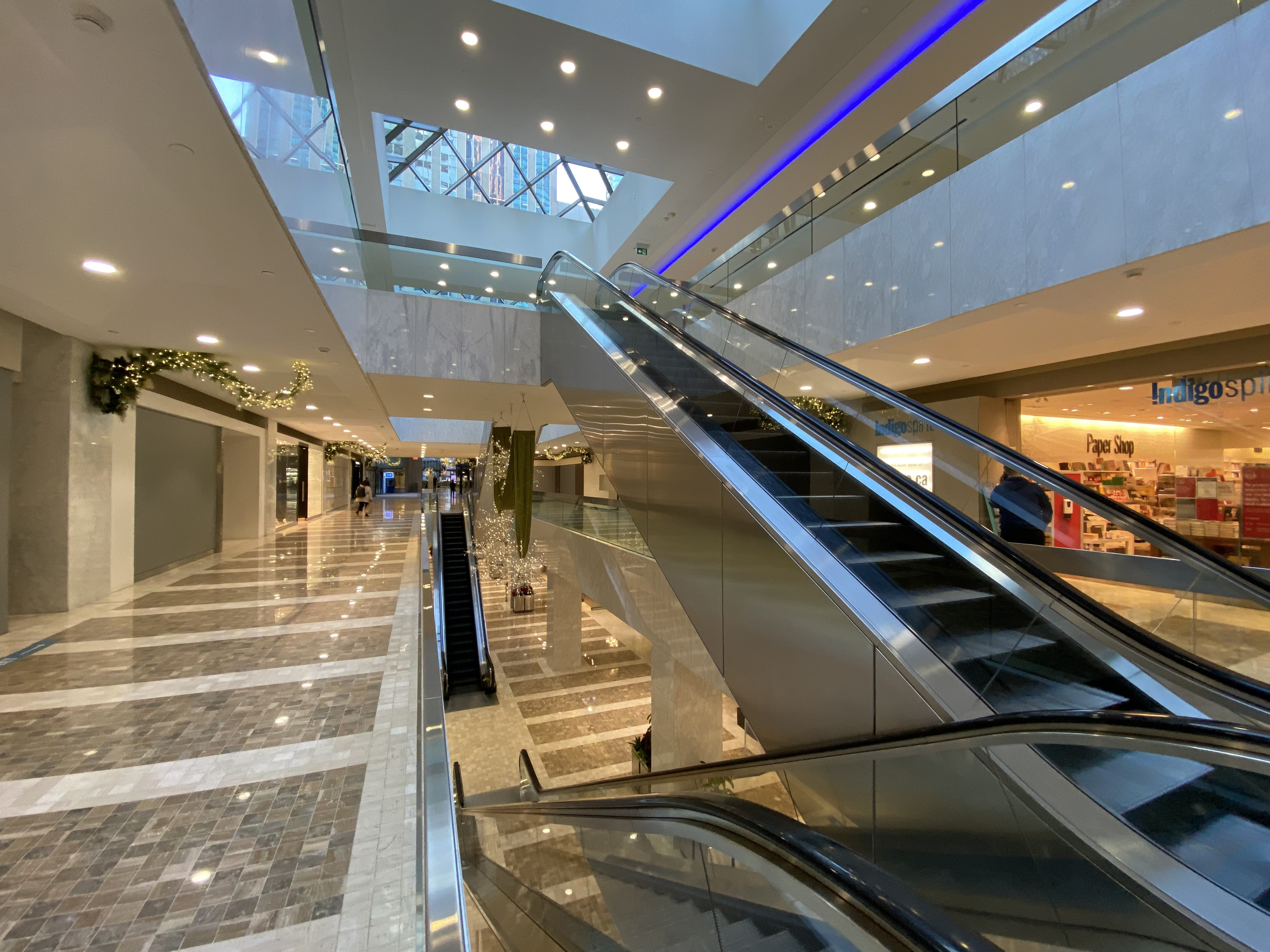
Shopping Mall

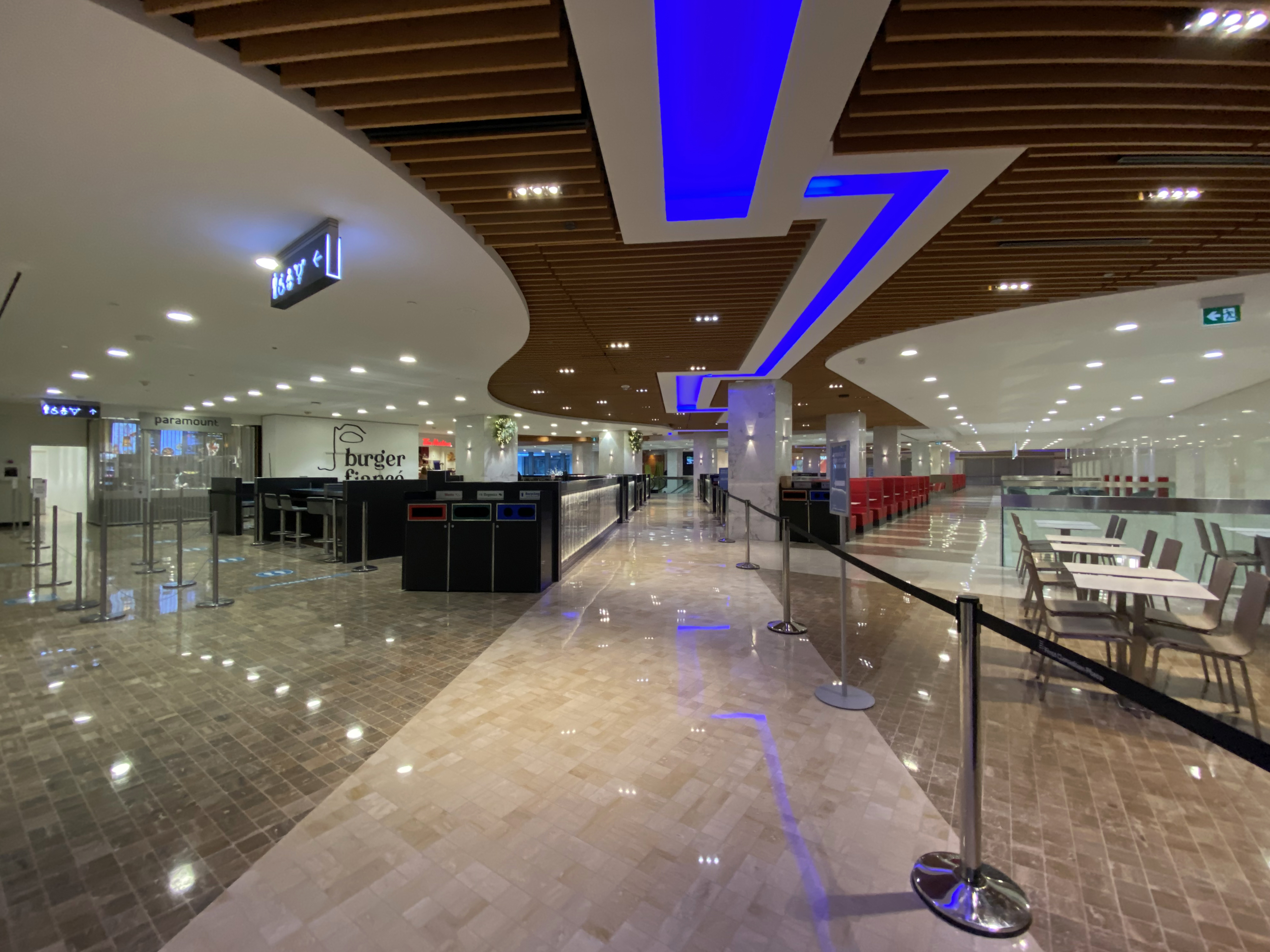
Food Court in Level 2

== See also ==
- Bank of Montreal Head Office
- List of tallest buildings in Canada
- List of tallest buildings in Toronto
- List of tallest freestanding steel structures
- List of tallest freestanding structures in the world

Records
Preceded by Commerce Court West	Tallest building in Canada; 298.1 metres (978 ft); 1975–2025	Succeeded by One Bloor West
Preceded by Commerce Court West	Tallest building in Toronto; 298.1 metres (978 ft); 1975–2025	Succeeded by One Bloor West
