= RJC Engineers =

RJC Engineers (Read Jones Christoffersen Ltd.) is a Canadian engineering firm involved in structural engineering, building science, and heritage restoration. Founded in 1948, the company operates across multiple offices in Canada and is frequently involved in significant heritage and adaptive reuse projects. Recent high-profile adaptive reuse projects include leading the conversion of underutilized office buildings into homeless shelters for the City of Toronto.

== Heritage restoration and adaptive reuse ==
RJC Engineers has contributed to the restoration and adaptive reuse of numerous historic buildings throughout Canada. The firm's Heritage Restoration group specializes in assessing, preserving, and repurposing heritage structures, allowing for the continued use of architecturally and culturally significant sites while meeting contemporary standards.

== Notable projects ==
One of the firm's most recognized adaptive reuse projects is the Simmons Mattress Factory in Calgary's East Village. Originally built in 1912 as an industrial mattress factory, the structure underwent extensive rehabilitation led by RJC Engineers in collaboration with local architects and developers. The project included structural upgrades and heritage restoration, enabling the building's transformation into a mixed-use destination featuring restaurants and community spaces. The Simmons Building is frequently cited as a leading example of adaptive reuse in Calgary, demonstrating how historic industrial buildings can be preserved and revitalized for modern urban life.

Other projects undertaken by the company include:

- Calgary City Hall restoration
- King Edward School Arts Hub, Calgary (cSPACE)
- Hudson's Bay Company Building restoration, Winnipeg

== See also ==
- List of historic places in Alberta
- Heritage conservation in Canada
- Culture of Alberta
