= Tridel =

Toronto based real estate developer

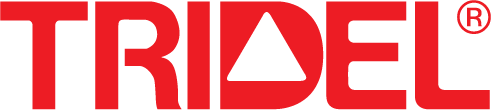
- Type: Private
- Industry: Real estate development
- Founded: 1934; 92 years ago
- Headquarters: Toronto, Ontario, Canada
- Number of employees: 500
- Website: www.tridel.com

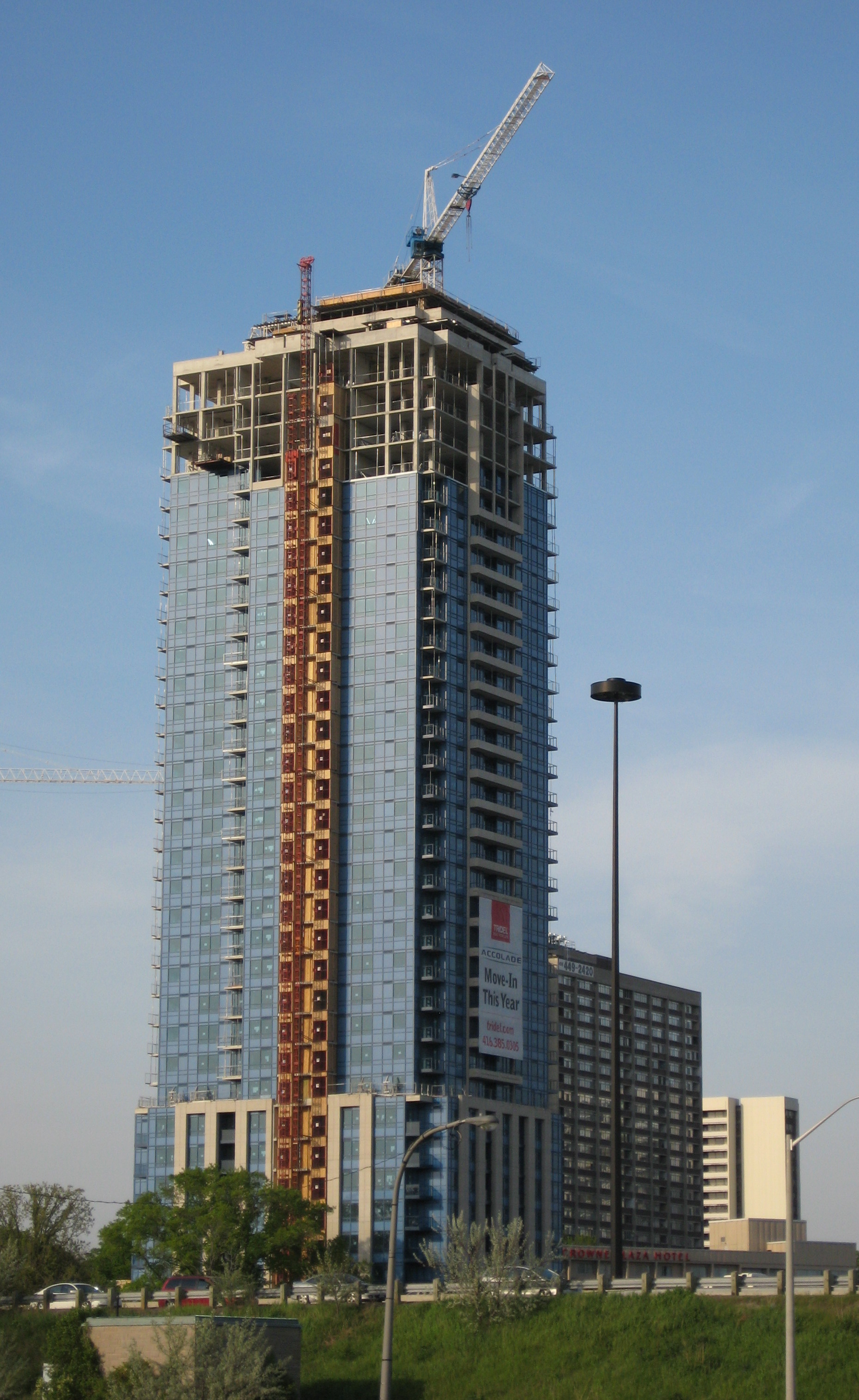
The Tridel Accolade under construction in Toronto, Ontario.

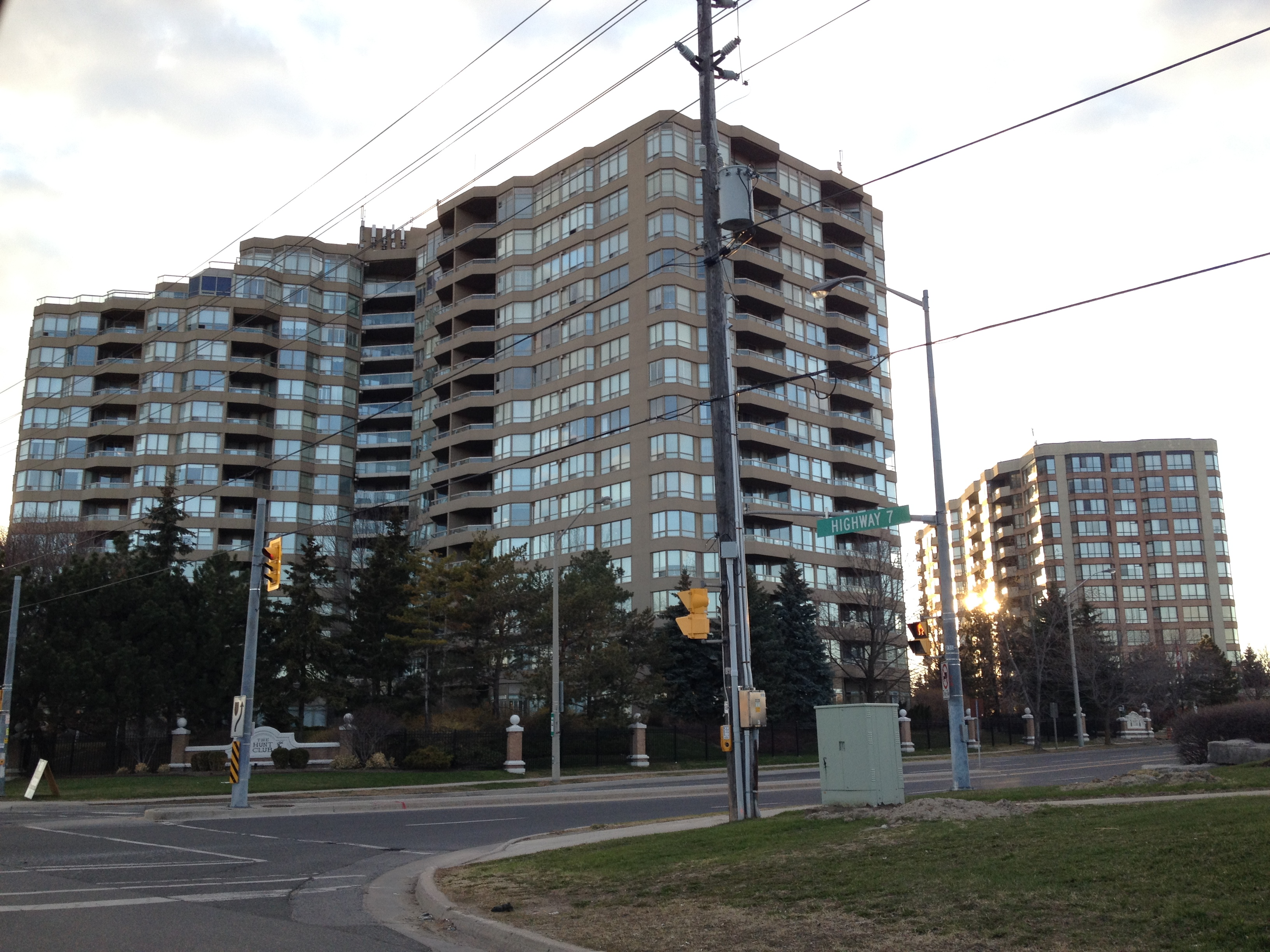
Condominiums built by Tridel in Markham, Ontario.

Tridel is a major Canadian real estate developer based in Toronto, Ontario. It is the largest builder of condominiums in the Greater Toronto Area. Since being founded in the 1930s it has built some 90,000 homes.

== History ==
=== Founding ===
The company was founded by Jack DelZotto, an Italian stonemason who came to Canada in 1927. He first worked in mines near Timmins, but soon came to Toronto where he helped lay bricks for the Park Plaza Hotel. DelZotto built his first single family home in 1934 in the Bloor and Dufferin area. His firm prospered in the building boom after the Second World War, erecting suburban houses across the Toronto area. The company was handed over to DelZotto's three sons, Angelo, Elvio and Leo. The name of the company refers to the three (tri) Delbrothers. In 1951 the company built its first rental apartment building, and in the following decades became one of the largest builders of apartment and condominium towers in Canada. Tridel played a central role in Toronto's skyscraper boom in the 1970s. With the collapse of the housing market in the early 1980s Tridel took on a number of government contracts building subsidized housing and housing co-ops. The company went public in 1986, though the DelZotto family remained in control of the firm. The public company TDZ Holdings Inc. was dissolved in October 2013. Today, the Tridel Group of Companies is privately held.

=== Restructuring ===
The end of the 1980s property boom placed the company in severe distress. The problems began in 1992 when subsidiary Aluma Systems Corp was unable to meet some $226 million in debt obligations. The company was unable to meet these needs and for several years bankruptcy threatened. Citibank, to whom the money was owed, seized a significant portion of the company. In 1998 a restructuring agreement was finally reached between the company, its creditors and the government. The DelZotto family had to give up a significant portion of their ownership of the firm, but Tridel was saved from bankruptcy.

=== Growth ===
Following a period of struggle, Tridel revived itself as one of the city’s biggest developers during the 2000s housing boom. The late 1990s and early years of the 21st century saw an unprecedented building boom occur in Toronto and Tridel was a central player. Today the Tridel group consists of a group of companies including building company Deltera (Construction Management), Del Realty Incorporated Brokerage (Real Estate Broker), Del Property Management (Condominium Property Management), DelSuites (Corporate Housing), Del Condominium Rentals (Condominium Rental Management), The DMS Group (Property Services) and Delmanor (Retirement Living). The boom has seen Tridel erect condominium towers across the Toronto area. Tridel has also been praised for its innovative technology and especially its focus on environmentally friendly design.

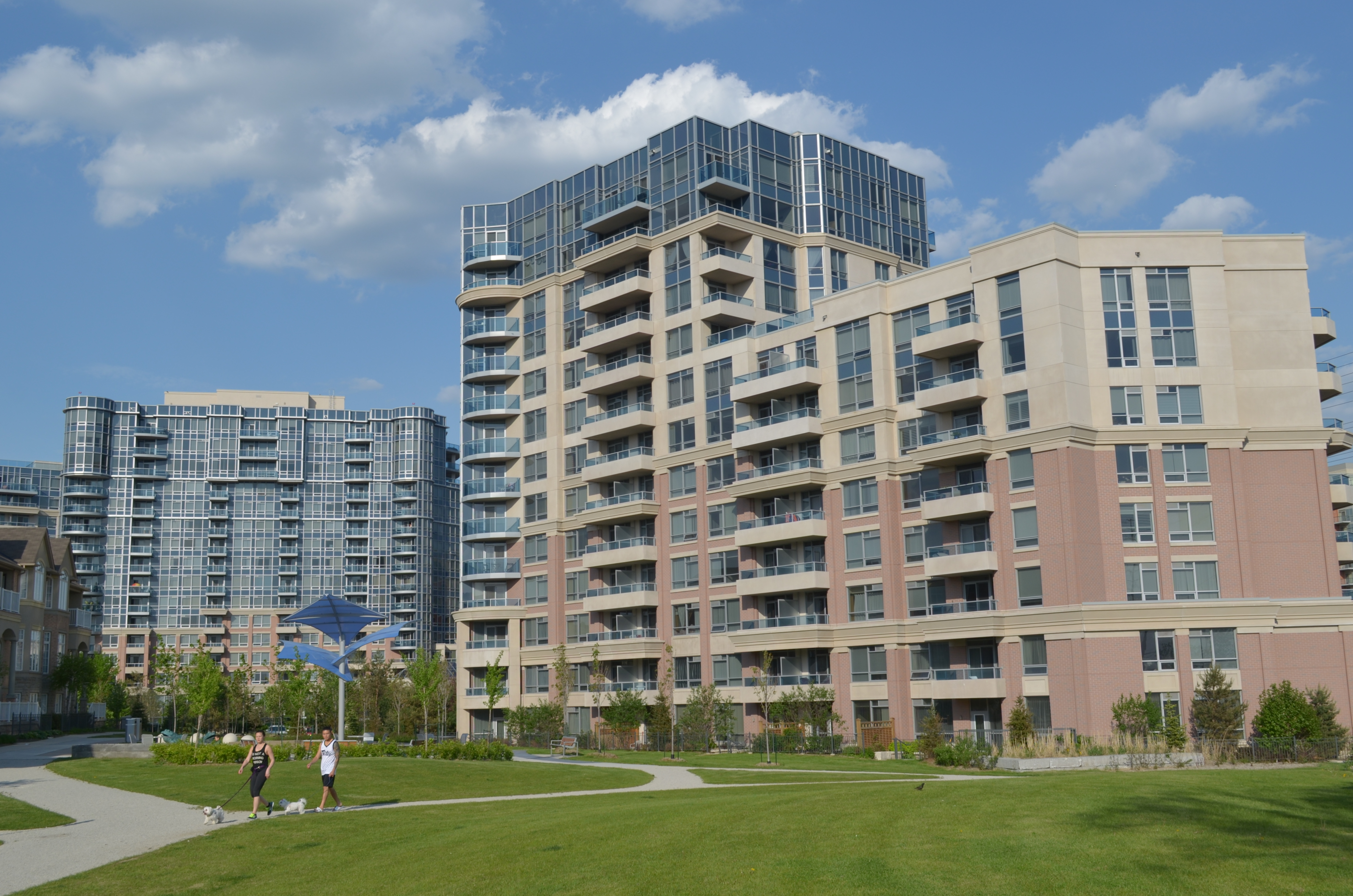
Tridel condos in Markham, Ontario.
