= Yonge Street Rapidway =

Bus rapid transit corridor in York Region, Canada

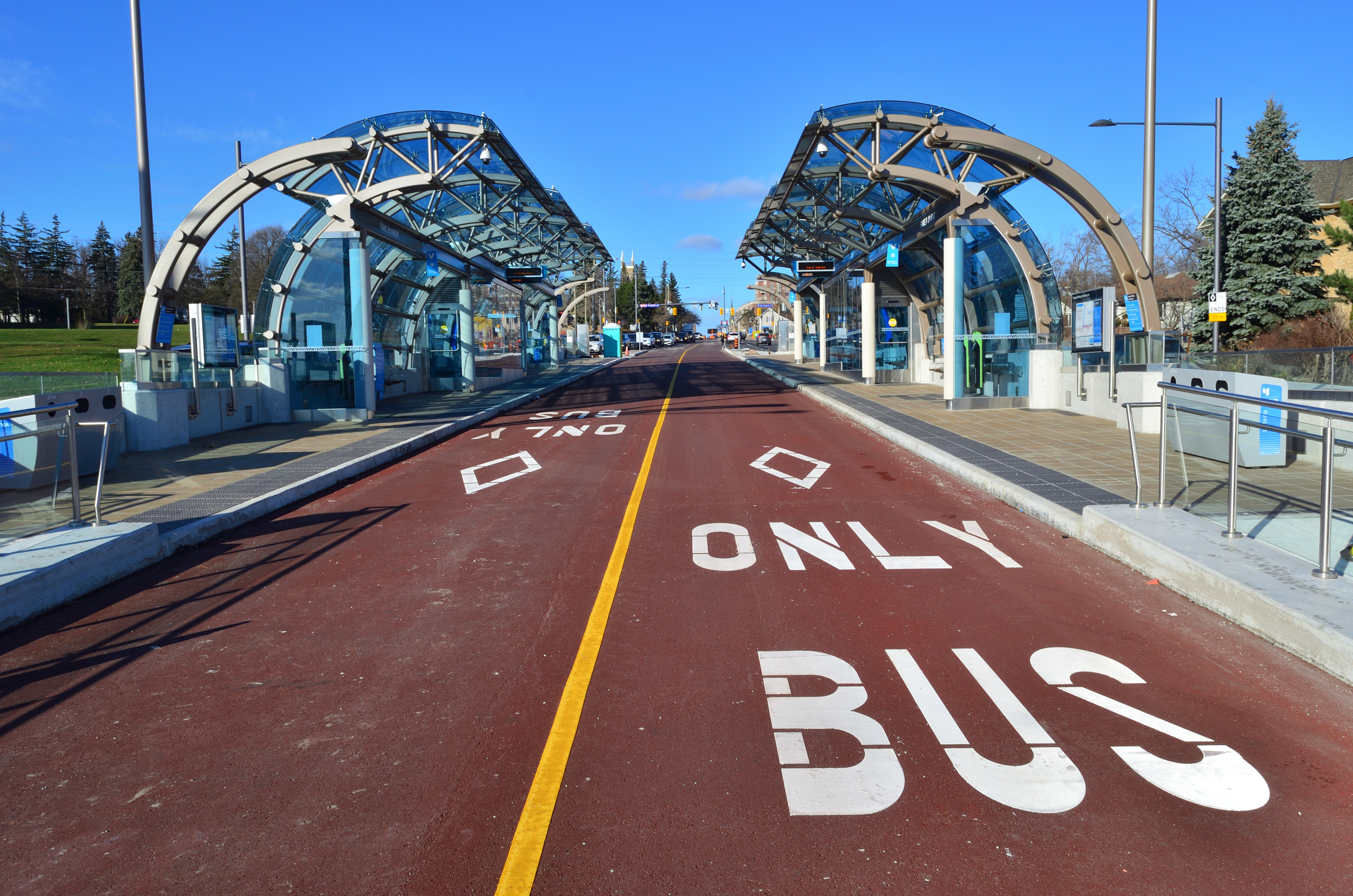
- Major MacKenzie Viva station in 2020

Overview
- System: Viva Rapid Transit
- Operator: York Region Transit
- Status: Open
- Began service: January 5, 2020; 6 years ago

Route
- Route type: Bus rapid transit
- Locale: York Region, Ontario (Newmarket; Aurora; Richmond Hill; Markham; Vaughan)
- Start: Newmarket Terminal
- End: Richmond Hill Centre Terminal
- Length: 8.9 km (5.5 mi)
- Stations: 10

The Yonge Street Rapidway is a bus rapid transit corridor on Yonge Street in York Region, Ontario, Canada. Construction of the Yonge Street portion of the network began in 2014. The Rapidway is primarily used by the Viva Blue service, but may also be used by emergency vehicles.

The Yonge Street Rapidway is central to the Vivanext transport masterplan and will eventually extend from the Richmond Hill/Langstaff Urban Growth Centre at Highway 7 to Green Lane in East Gwillimbury.

In February 2010, a public open house was held for the first segment of the Yonge Street Rapidway, which will extend from Mulock to Davis Drive in Newmarket.

The first segment from the Newmarket Bus Terminal on Davis Drive to Mulock Drive opened in January 2020. The second segment, from 19th Avenue to the Richmond Hill Centre Terminal at Highway 7, opened in December 2020.

The corridor was originally intended to continue south of Richmond Hill Centre Terminal towards the regional bus terminal at Finch subway station in Toronto. However, with the anticipated northward extension of the Yonge–University subway, Richmond Hill Centre will remain the Rapidway's southern terminus.

== Stations ==
Excluding the terminals, there will be up to 19 Rapidway stations between Newmarket and Richmond Hill. Ten stations were open by the end of 2020.

Stations
| Name | Opening date | Municipality |
| Newmarket Terminal | N/A | Newmarket |
| Davis | January 5, 2020 | Newmarket |
| Eagle | January 5, 2020 | Newmarket |
| Mulock | January 5, 2020 | Newmarket |
| Savage | TBD | Newmarket |
| Orchard Heights | TBD | Aurora |
| Wellington | TBD | Aurora |
| Golf Links | TBD | Aurora |
| Henderson | TBD | Aurora |
| Bloomington | TBD | Aurora / Richmond Hill |
| Regatta | TBD | Richmond Hill |
| King | TBD | Richmond Hill |
| Jefferson | TBD | Richmond Hill |
| 19th–Gamble | December 20, 2020 | Richmond Hill |
| Bernard | December 20, 2020 | Richmond Hill |
| Elgin Mills | December 20, 2020 | Richmond Hill |
| Crosby (heritage area) | December 20, 2020 | Richmond Hill |
| Major Mackenzie | December 20, 2020 | Richmond Hill |
| Weldrick | December 20, 2020 | Richmond Hill |
| 16th–Carrville | December 20, 2020 | Richmond Hill |
| Bantry–Scott | December 20, 2020 | Richmond Hill |
| Richmond Hill Centre | N/A | Richmond Hill |
