= Thorncliffe =

Thorncliffe or Thorncliff is the name of the following places:

In Canada

- Thorncliffe, Calgary
- Thorncliff, Edmonton
- Thorncliff, Ontario
- Thorncliffe Park, a neighbourhood in Toronto, Ontario

In England

- Thorncliffe, Staffordshire
- Thorncliffe, West Yorkshire

== See also ==
- Thorncliffe Park Raceway
- Thorncliffe Stable
