= East York Town Centre =

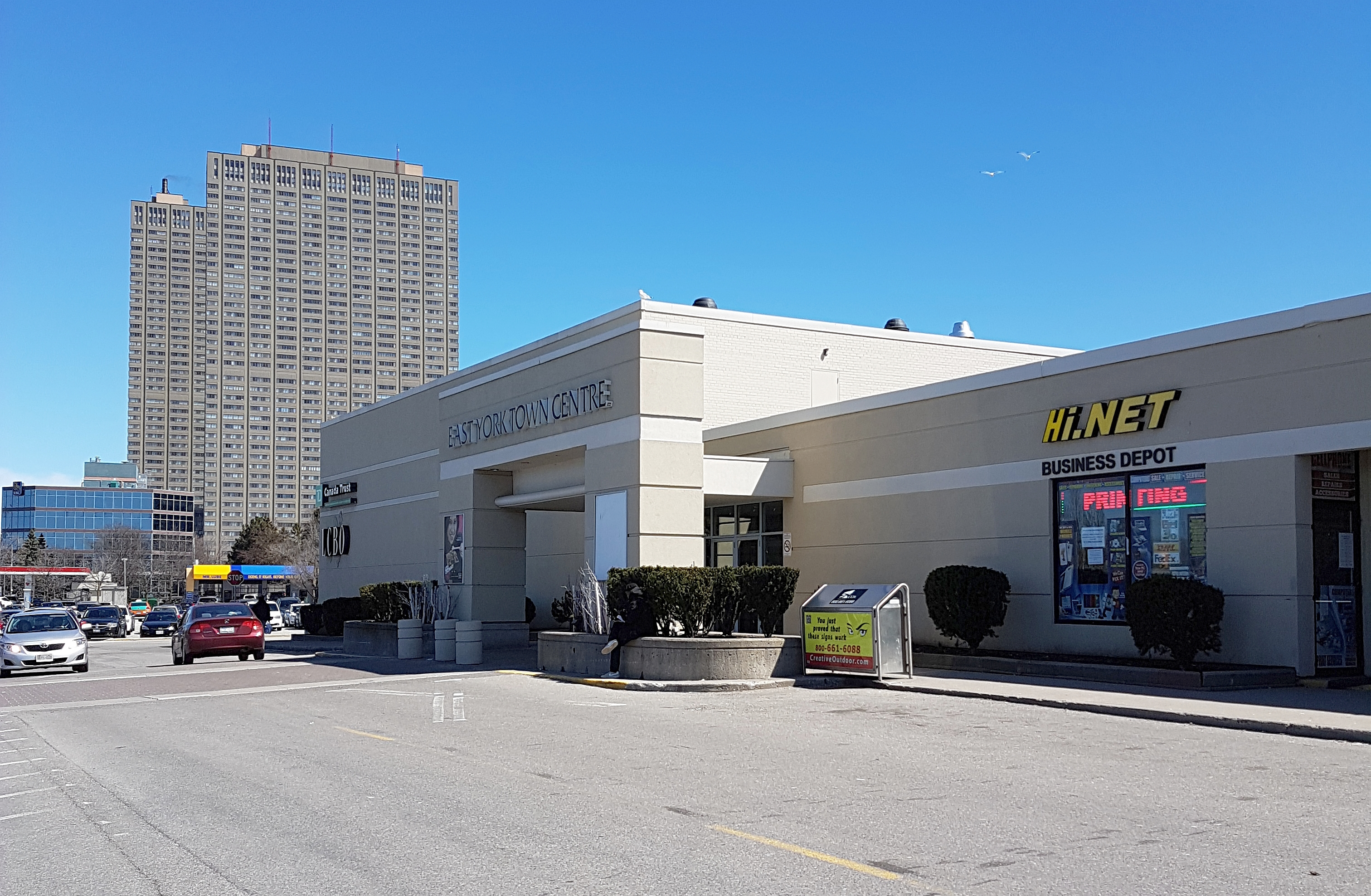
- East York Town Centre with Leaside Towers in the background
- Coordinates: 43.7057°N 79.3461°W
- Address: 45 Overlea Boulevard; Toronto, Ontario; M4H 1C3
- Opened: 1960
- Manager: Morguard
- Owner: Morguard
- Num. of stores: 100+
- Num. of anchor tenants: 2 (Food Basics and Shoppers Drug Mart)
- Floor area: 360,045 square feet (33,449.3 m^{2})
- Floors: 1 (Former Target has 2 floors, the mall has a ground floor for offices and an upper floor for a banquet hall)
- Website: www.eastyorkshops.com

East York Town Centre is a shopping centre located in the Thorncliffe Park neighbourhood of Toronto, Ontario, Canada. The centre serves the surrounding community and contains a variety of retail stores, restaurants, and services. Its tenants include businesses in categories such as grocery, pharmacy, banking, food services, and personal services. Located on Overlea Boulevard, It continues to operate as a local shopping centre serving residents of Thorncliffe Park and surrounding areas.

== History ==
The shopping centre was opened to the public in 1960 as the Thorncliffe Market Place in the town of Leaside. Before 1954 the area was the northeast corner of racetrack and grassy area south of where the stables of the old Thorncliffe Park Raceway were. It began with two anchors, Sayvette and Steinberg's. The Sayvette department store dissolved in 1977. Woolco opened in the space where Sayvette previously occupied. Woolco was bought by Walmart in 1994. This location was unionized and eventually was sold to Zellers.

Zellers went in liquidation and closed in June 2012, making way for Target's entry into the Canadian market. Construction began in December 2012 to convert the Zellers store into a Target store, which opened March 25, 2013. Target Canada announced its closure of all its 133 stores in Canada (including the East York Town Centre location). In mid-2016, Thorncliffe Bowlerama closed down and was replaced with Fit4Less.

In 2021, the former Target location was used as a pop-up vaccine clinic during the COVID-19 pandemic in Toronto.

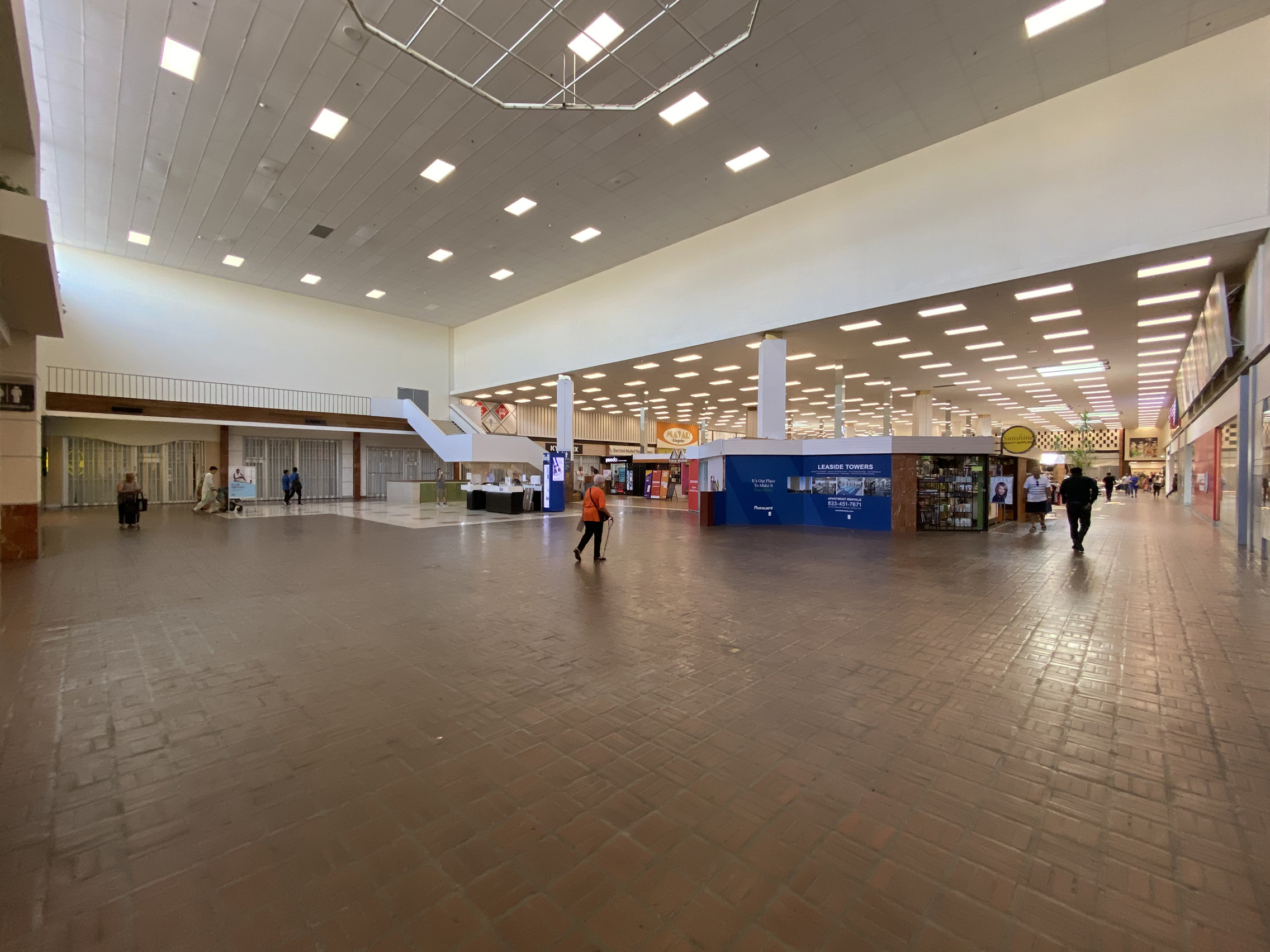
Atrium

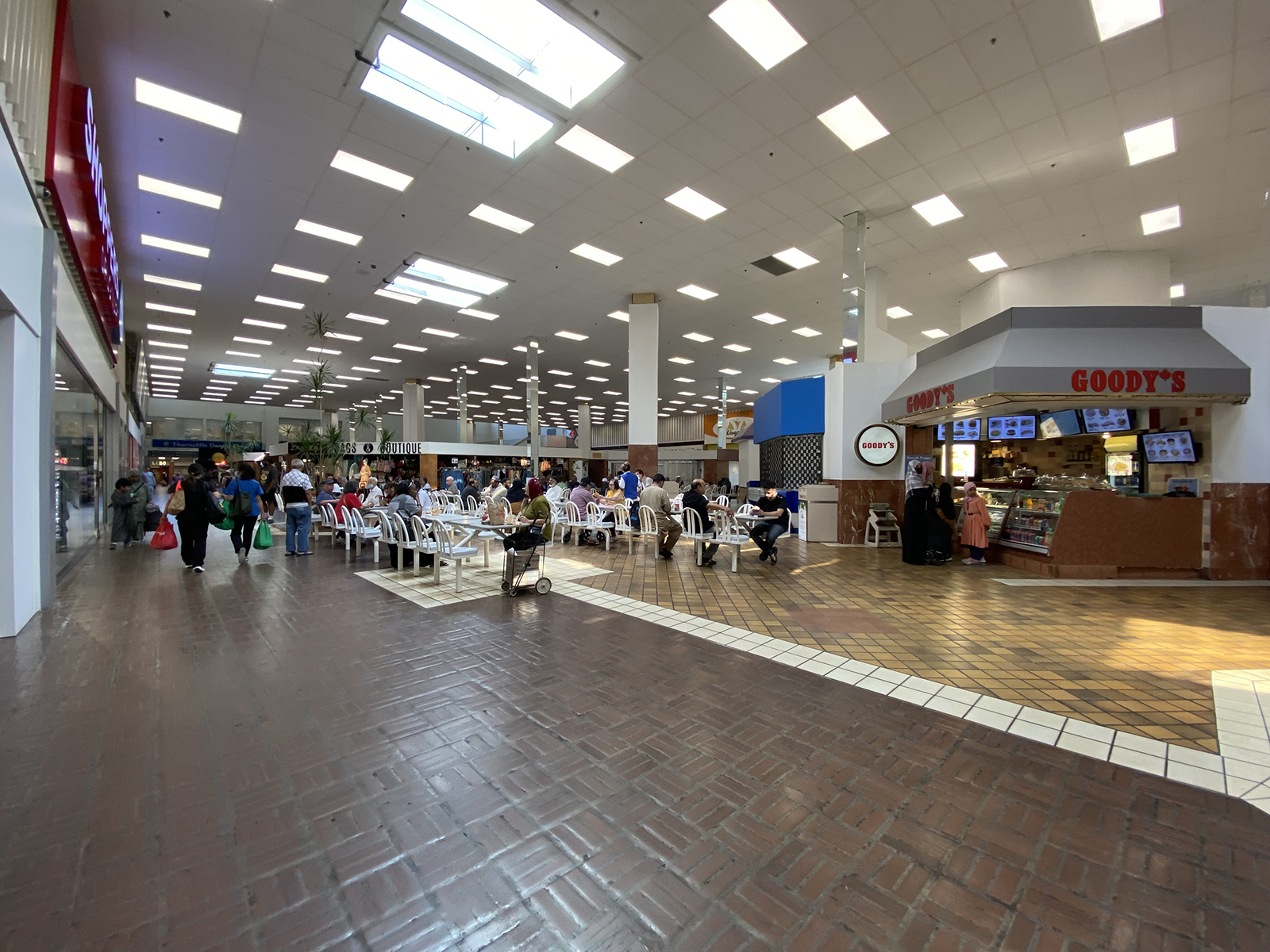
Food Court

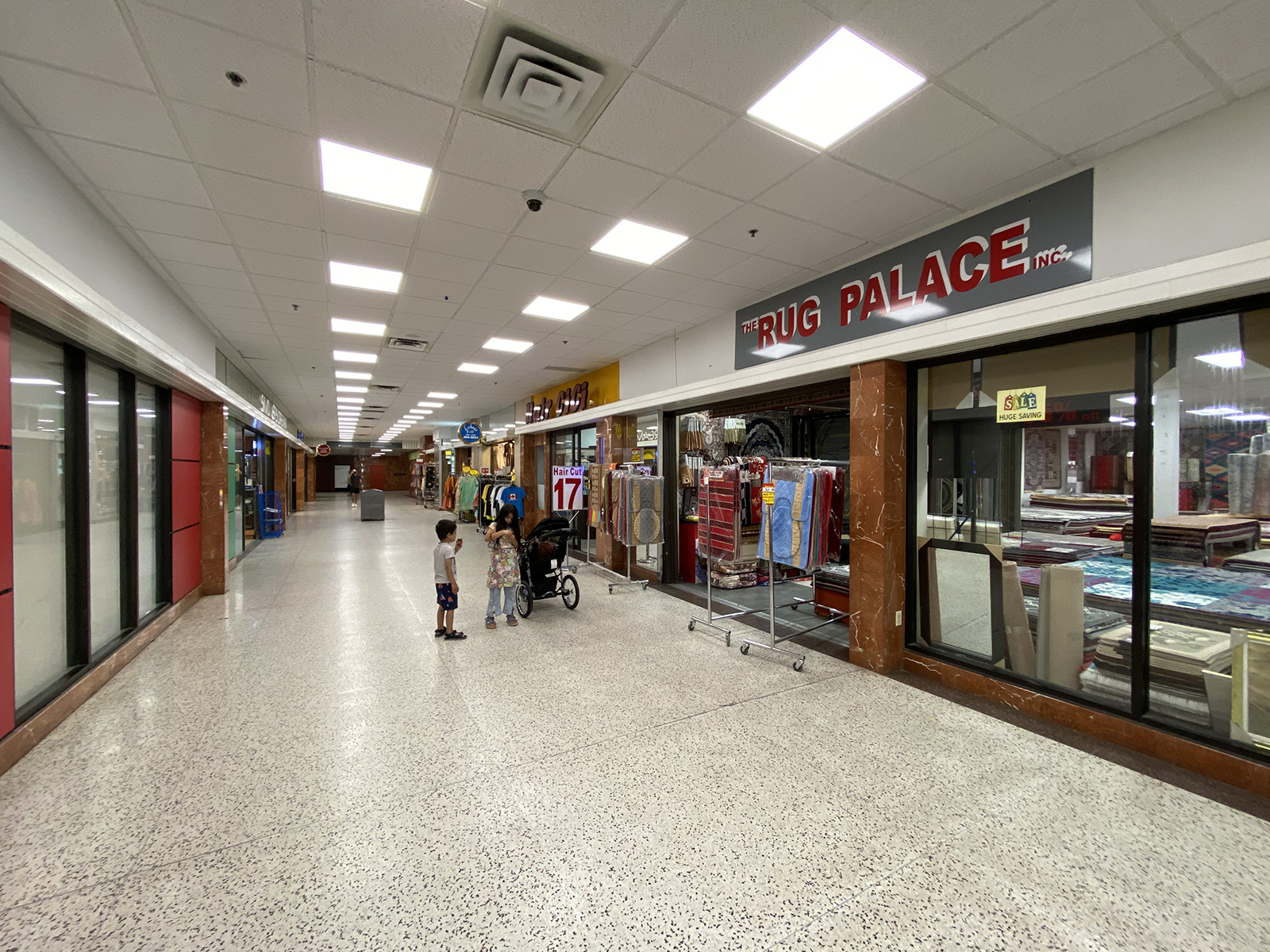
Mall Access

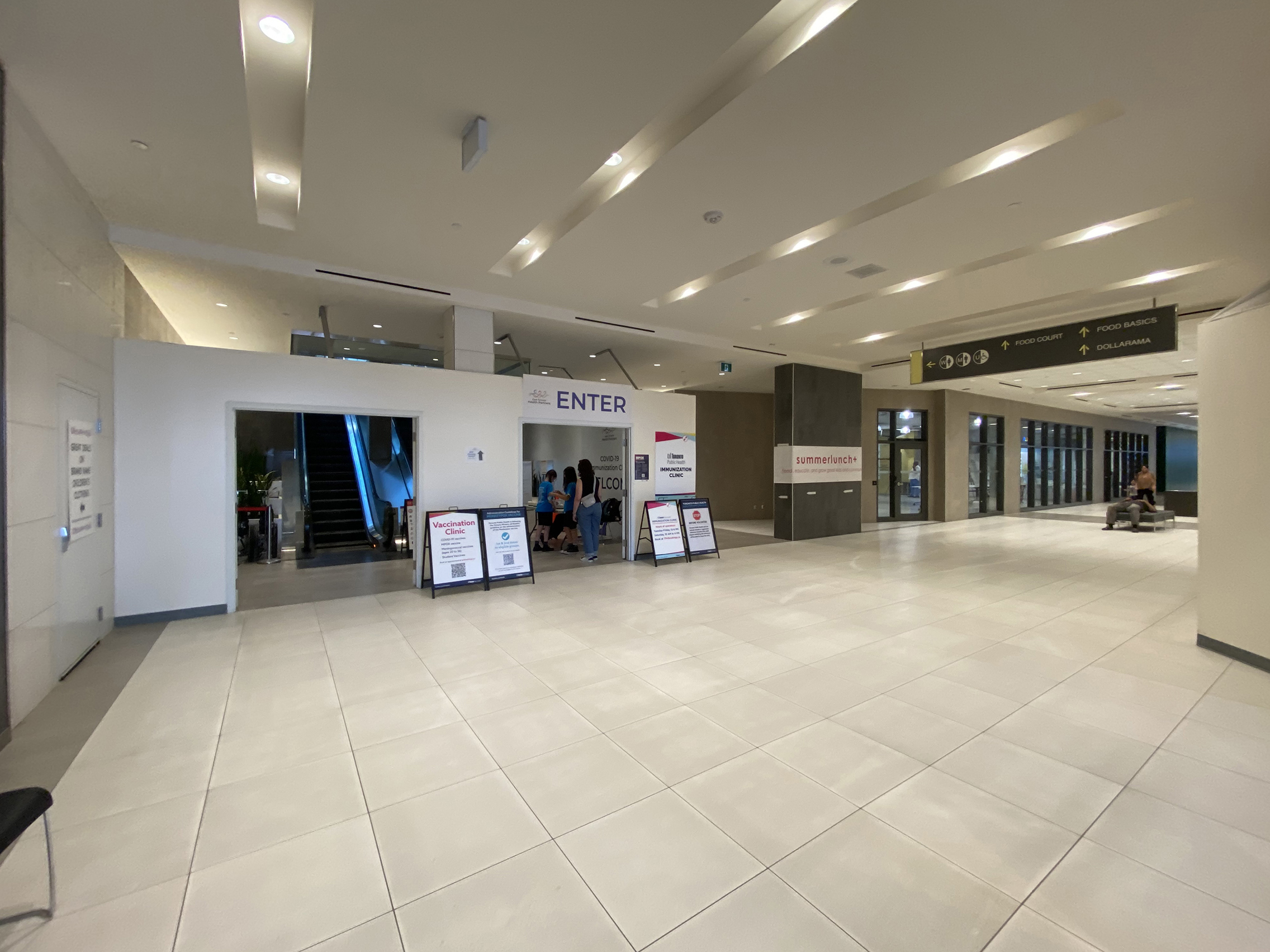
Former Target location divided into several shops, main focus on community
