= Thorncliffe Park =

- Neighbourhood
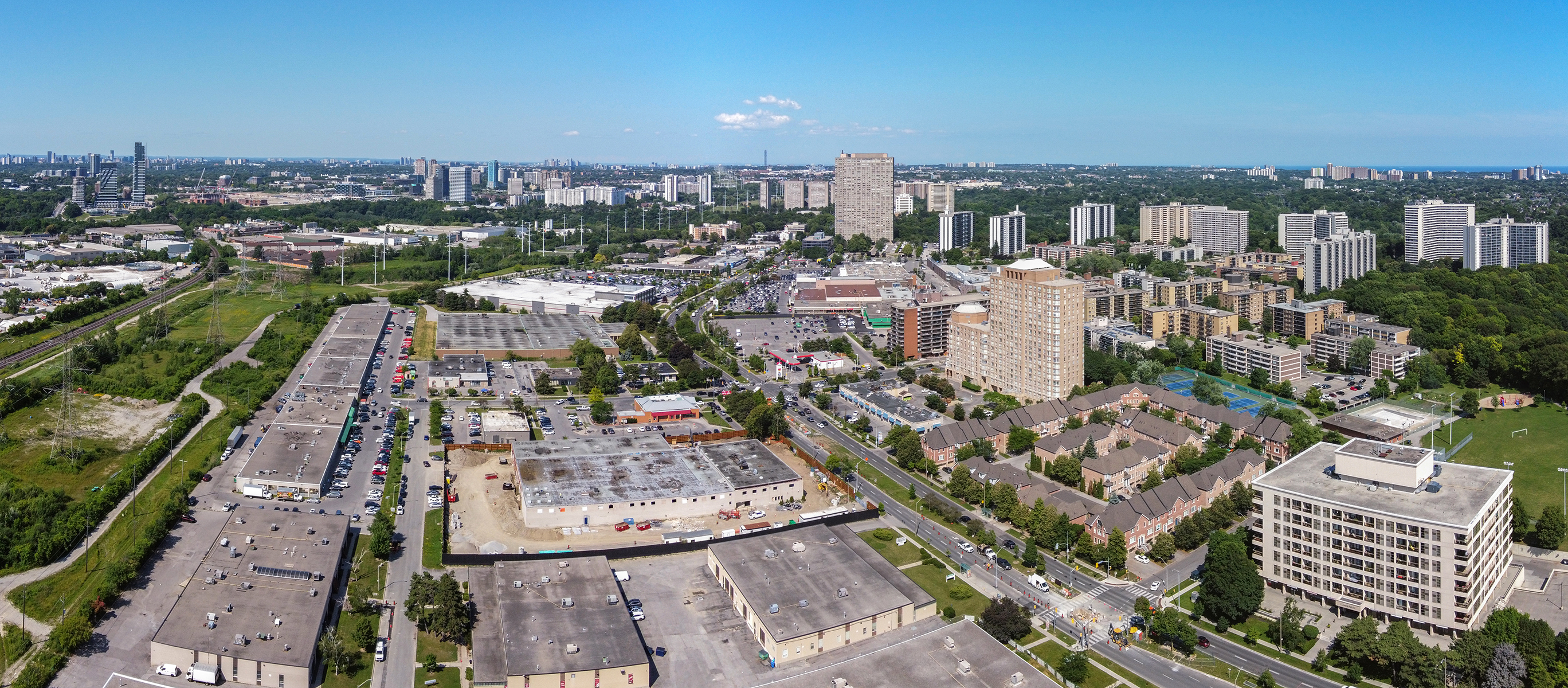
- Aerial view of Thorncliffe Park in 2023

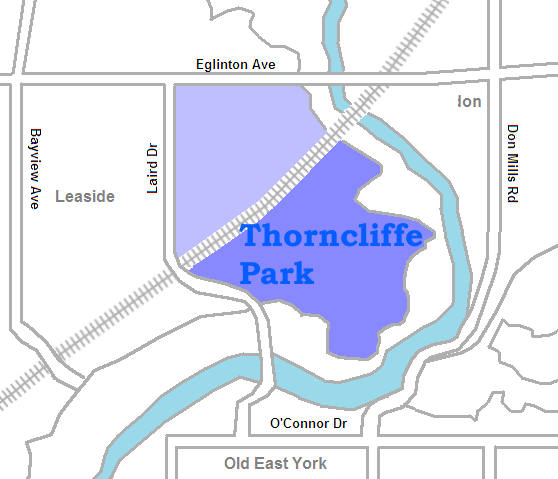
- Thorncliffe Park's boundaries, as recognized by the City of Toronto, includes the dark purple and light purple areas.
- Coordinates: 43°42′17″N 79°20′47″W
- Country: Canada
- Province: Ontario
- City: Toronto
- Changed Region: 1954 Leaside from York County
- Changed Municipality: 1967 East York from Leaside
- Changed Municipality: 1998 Toronto from East York

Government
  - MP: Rob Oliphant (Don Valley West)
  - MPP: Stephanie Bowman (Don Valley West)
  - Councillor: Rachel Chernos Lin (Ward 15 Don Valley West)

Thorncliffe Park is a neighbourhood in Toronto, Ontario, Canada, in the former Borough of East York.

The City of Toronto recognizes Thorncliffe Park's boundaries as the Don River on the south side; Leaside Bridge, Millwood Road, and Laird Drive on the west side; the West Don River on the east side; and Eglinton Avenue East on the north side.

== History ==
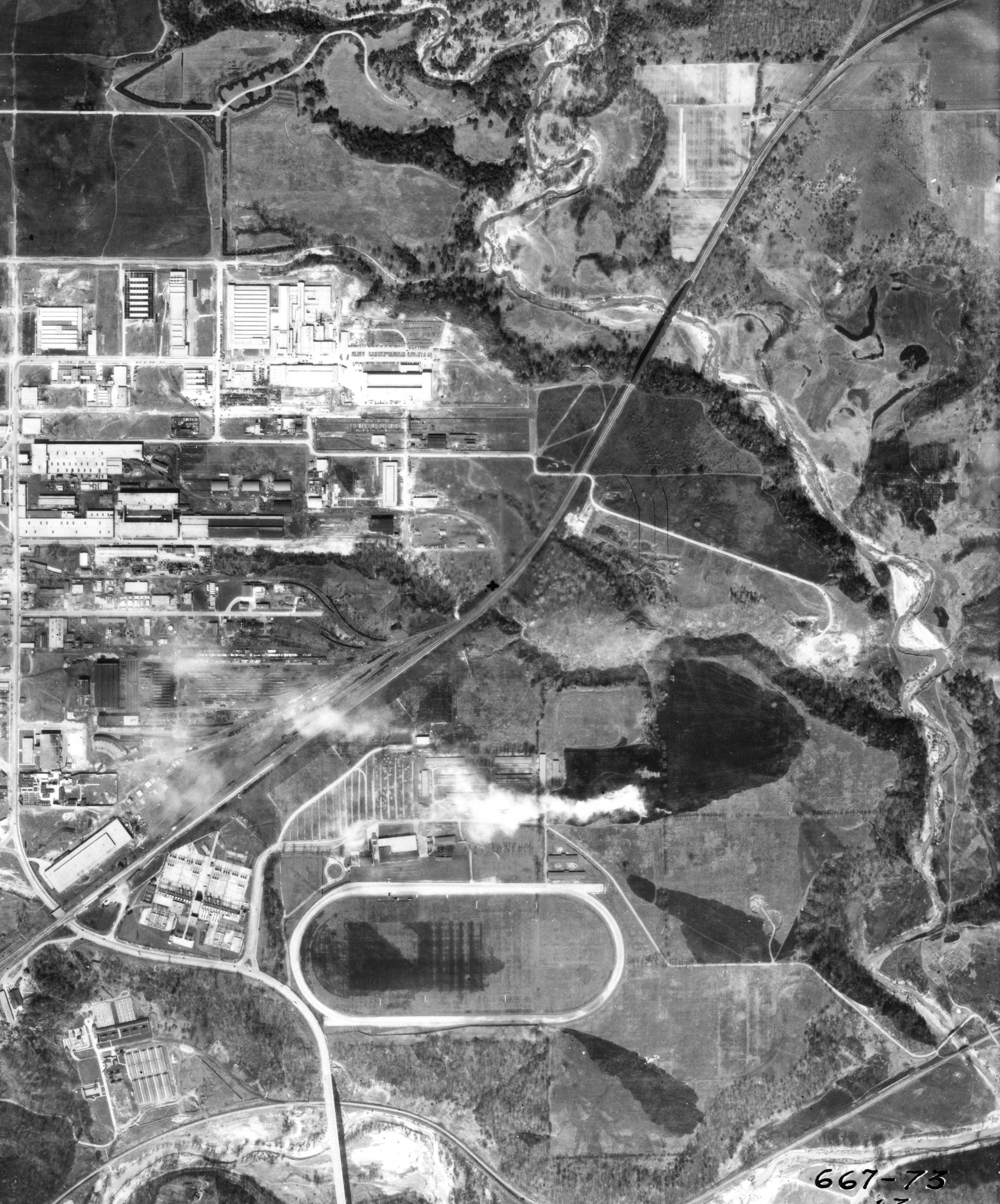
Aerial view of East York in 1942, with Thorncliffe Park Raceway visible to the south (bottom). The race track operated from 1917 to 1953.

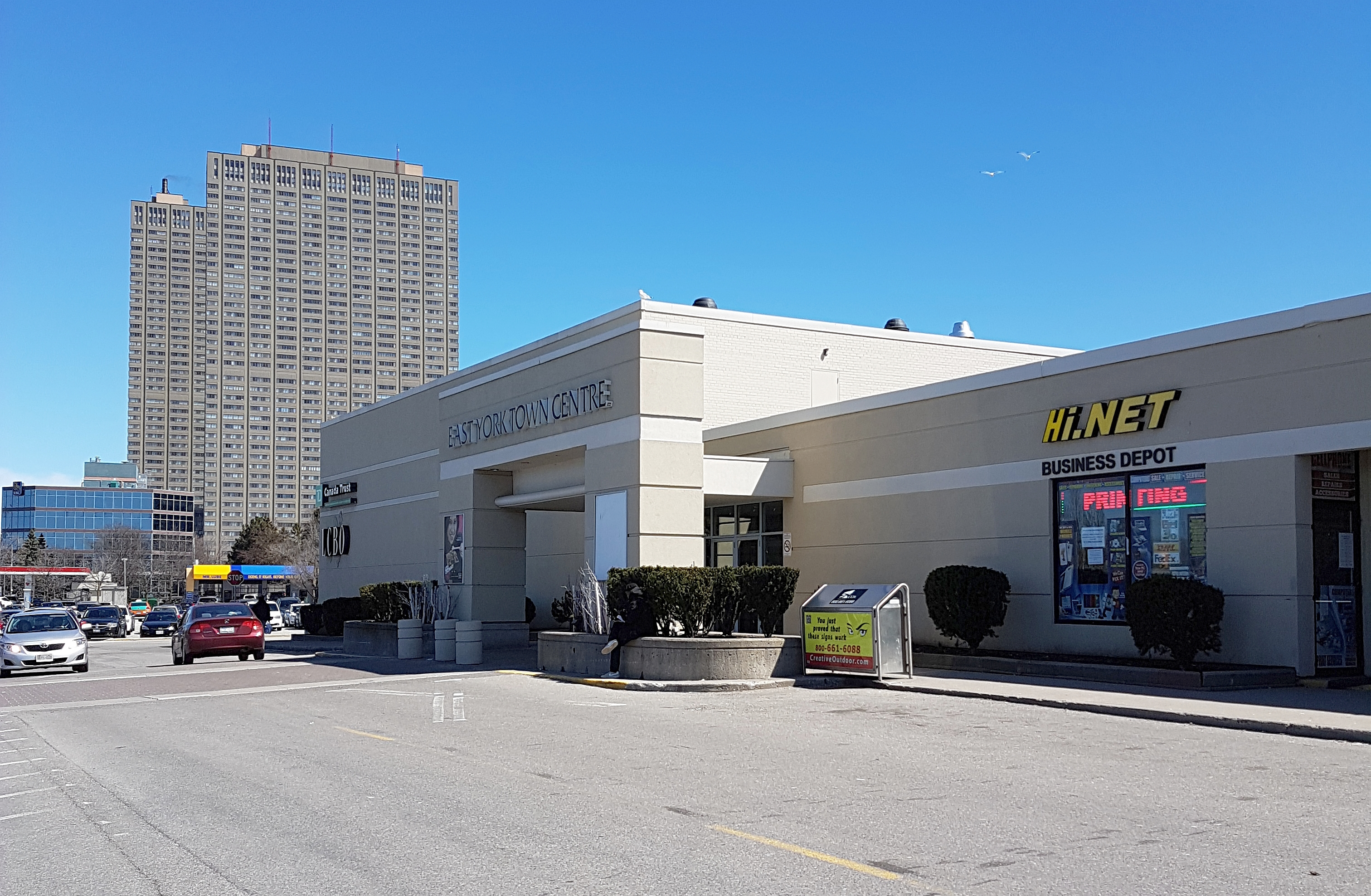
East York Town Centre

Thorncliffe Park takes its name from Thorn Cliff House, the first Toronto home of the Taylor family in the 19th century. The house stood on approximately 33 hectares (82 acres) of farmland purchased in 1831 by British settler John Taylor at the Forks of the Don Valley, in what is now E.T. Seton Park.

The Taylor family was originally from Staffordshire, a county in England where a village called Thorncliffe had been inhabited since the 1230s. Prior to the end of the 1600s, Thorncliffe was known as Thorntileg, meaning “a clearing amid thorn trees” in Old English, and the village was located on the south side of a deep ravine.

The Taylor property in Canada was acquired from Samuel Sinclair and had previously been farmed by Parshall Terry. Settlement records for the area date back to 1800, just seven years after the founding of the Town of York.

Thorn Cliff House remained the Taylor family home until 1888 and was demolished in the 1940s.

With growing business interests in horse and cattle breeding, farming, lumbering, and milling throughout the mid-19th century, John Taylor’s sons increased the family’s land holdings to thousands of acres in the Don Valley and surrounding table lands. This included all the land between the future Leslie Street and Don Valley Parkway, to a half mile north of Eglinton Avenue East, including the future Flemingdon Park. Six hundred acres of this land became known as Thorn Cliff Farm.

By 1888, a prominent Toronto businessperson and Taylor son-in-law named Robert T. Davies had purchased 600 acres of land including the original family home, Thorn Cliff. Davies founded Thorncliffe Stock Farm, sometimes referred to as Thorncliffe Stable, which became a world-famous facility for breeding Clydesdales, standardbreds, and the largest thoroughbred stable in Canada. Davies’s sons relocated the stables to Thornhill, Ontario after selling a significant portion of the farm in 1920 to American investors to operate a racetrack, doing business under the name Thorncliffe Park Racing and Breeding Association Ltd.

When it opened in 1920, Thorncliffe Park was Toronto's fourth racetrack. As a track for thoroughbred horse racing and harness racing, it had grandstand and bleacher capacity for 4,000 spectators, and stables for 610 horses. Canada's finest thoroughbreds were run at Thorncliffe, featured in important races like the Clarendon Stakes, the Prince of Wales Stakes, and the My Dear Stakes. The standardbred Maple Leaf Trot also originated at Thorncliffe.

Not as well-known, the Thorncliffe Ski Jump was the first and only ski jump ever to exist in Toronto. Located west of the former Ontario Science Centre, it was built by the Toronto Ski Club in 1933 and operated until February 1941. It hosted provincial and Canadian championships, and international competitions, that attracted thousands of spectators. Its last recorded event raised funds for the Canadian Red Cross and Norwegian War Aid Fund during World War II.

Crucially, Thorncliffe's racetrack played an important role in the growth of the towns of East York and Leaside, from its first race to its last. Building a bridge over the Don Valley to unlock development opportunities for the two towns had been discussed since 1911, but it was the popularity of horse racing at Thorncliffe Park that caused the respective town councils to agree to build the East York Leaside Viaduct. In 1952, Thorncliffe was purchased by the Ontario Jockey Club, which was consolidating racetracks and benefitting from real estate deals due to Toronto's post-war suburban expansion. After the last harness race in 1953, the land was immediately transferred to a development company called Thorncliffe Park Limited.

In 1954, the Ontario Municipal Board approved the Town of Leaside to annex the 400-acre former racetrack site from York County to facilitate residential, commercial, and manufacturing development. Thorncliffe Park became a part of the Borough of East York in 1967, and the City of Toronto in 1998.

From 1954 onward, Thorncliffe Park was designed as a planned community, with Overlea Boulevard as the main commercial thoroughfare, initially separating manufacturing activities to the north and residential development to the south. One of the first enclosed shopping malls to open in Canada was Thorncliffe Park Market Plaza, and 30 mid-rise to high-rise rental apartment buildings were built from the 1960s into the early 1970s. Leaside Towers were Canada's, and The Commonwealth's, tallest residential buildings for many years. The Coca-Cola Company's Canadian head office was also located in Thorncliffe Park from 1964 to 2013. The City of Toronto designated it a heritage property in 2017.

Thorncliffe Park's horse racing heritage is recognized in street names such as Grandstand Place and Milepost Place; through preservation of the concrete winner's circle on property occupied by Costco on Overlea Boulevard; and by residential buildings named for racetrack stables: Churchill, Maple Glen, and Willow Glen.

=== Street names ===
Some of Thorncliffe Park's street names commemorate a former racetrack located there, or recognize the Town of Leaside's role in the development of the new community.

- Leaside Park Drive – named in 1966, six months before the Town of Leaside's amalgamation into the Borough of East York.
- Beth Nealson Drive – named after Beth Nealson, the last mayor of the Town of Leaside.
- William Morgan Drive – named for Leaside's reeve from 1948 to 1950.
- Banigan Drive – named for an elected member of Town of Leaside's Council from 1951 to 1955. Banigan was defeated by Charles H. Hiscott in the 1955 election to replace retiring mayor Howard Burrell.
- Pat Moore Drive – named for a Thorncliffe Park resident and community advocate.
- Patriarch Bartholomew Way – recognizes the Toronto visit of the spiritual leader of Eastern Orthodox Christians, Bartholomew I of Constantinople.

== Demographics ==
According to the 2016 Census, Thorncliffe Park has a population of 21,108, a 9.79% increase from 2011. The top 10 non-English mother tongues are Urdu (24.4%), Pashto (5.1%), Tagalog (Filipino) (4.7%), Persian (4.6%), Gujarati (4.1%), Arabic (3.5%), Bengali (2%), Greek (1.5%), Punjabi (1.4%), and Spanish (1.4%).

According to the 2016 Census, Thorncliffe Park is an extremely diverse community, with the vast majority of its residents being Visible minorities, with many being immigrants. Just under one third, 32%, of Thorncliffe Park residents were born in Canada, and over 18% of Thorncliffe Park residents immigrated into Canada between 2011 and 2016.

Pakistani, Indian and Afghan Canadians make up 21%, 17.6% and 8.8% of the neighbourhood's population, respectively.

In 2016, 46.6% of residents identified as South Asian, 20.5% identified as White Canadian, 8.45% identified as West Asian Canadians, 7.1% identified as Filipino Canadians, 5.2% identified as Black Canadians, 3.2% identified as Arab Canadians, 2.04% identified as Chinese Canadians, 1.42% identified as Latin American Canadians and 0.6% identified as Korean Canadians.

== Infrastructure ==
=== Transportation ===
==== Public Transportation ====
Toronto Transit Commission buses operate in the community. When the new Line 5 Eglinton line opened in 2026, the 72 Pape and 88 South Leaside buses connect to Don Valley and Laird stations, respectively. Thorncliffe Park Station will be a new stop on the Ontario Line, expected to open in 2030. Metrolinx is also building a maintenance and storage facility in the neighbourhood. The project requires the relocation of culturally-significant amenities and services, resulting in community members calling for a redesign of the project locally.

Prior to the Ontario Line, rapid transit service to Thorncliffe Park was considered in a number of proposed but unbuilt projects from the late 1960s onward, including: Queen Street Subway, GO-Urban Network, Central Radial Line, Downtown Relief Line, Don Mills LRT, and Relief Line North.

==== Roads ====
The Overlea Bridge, formally known as the Charles H. Hiscott Bridge, was built in 1960 to cross the west branch of the Don River and connect Overlea Boulevard to Don Mills Road, linking Thorncliffe Park to Flemingdon Park. The bridge was named for former mayor of Leaside Charles Henry Hiscott (1956 to 1961). Reconstruction is planned for the 2022-2025 period as part of the Renewing Overlea Boulevard project and will included widened sidewalks, the addition of cycle tracks and public art.

== Education ==
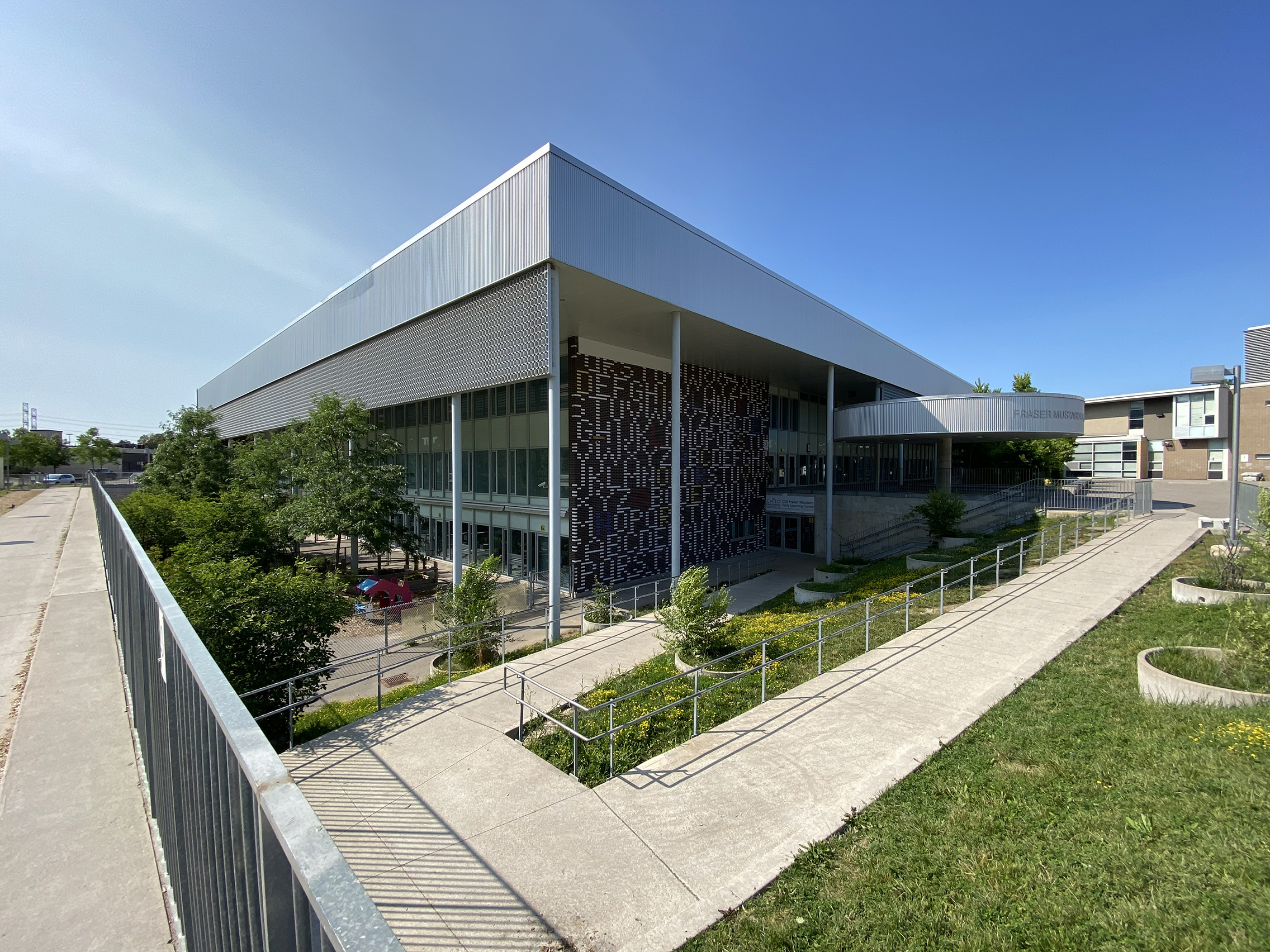
Fraser Mustard Early Learning Academy

The Toronto District School Board operates two schools in Thorncliffe Park: Fraser Mustard Early Learning Academy, and Thorncliffe Park Public School.

== Recreation ==
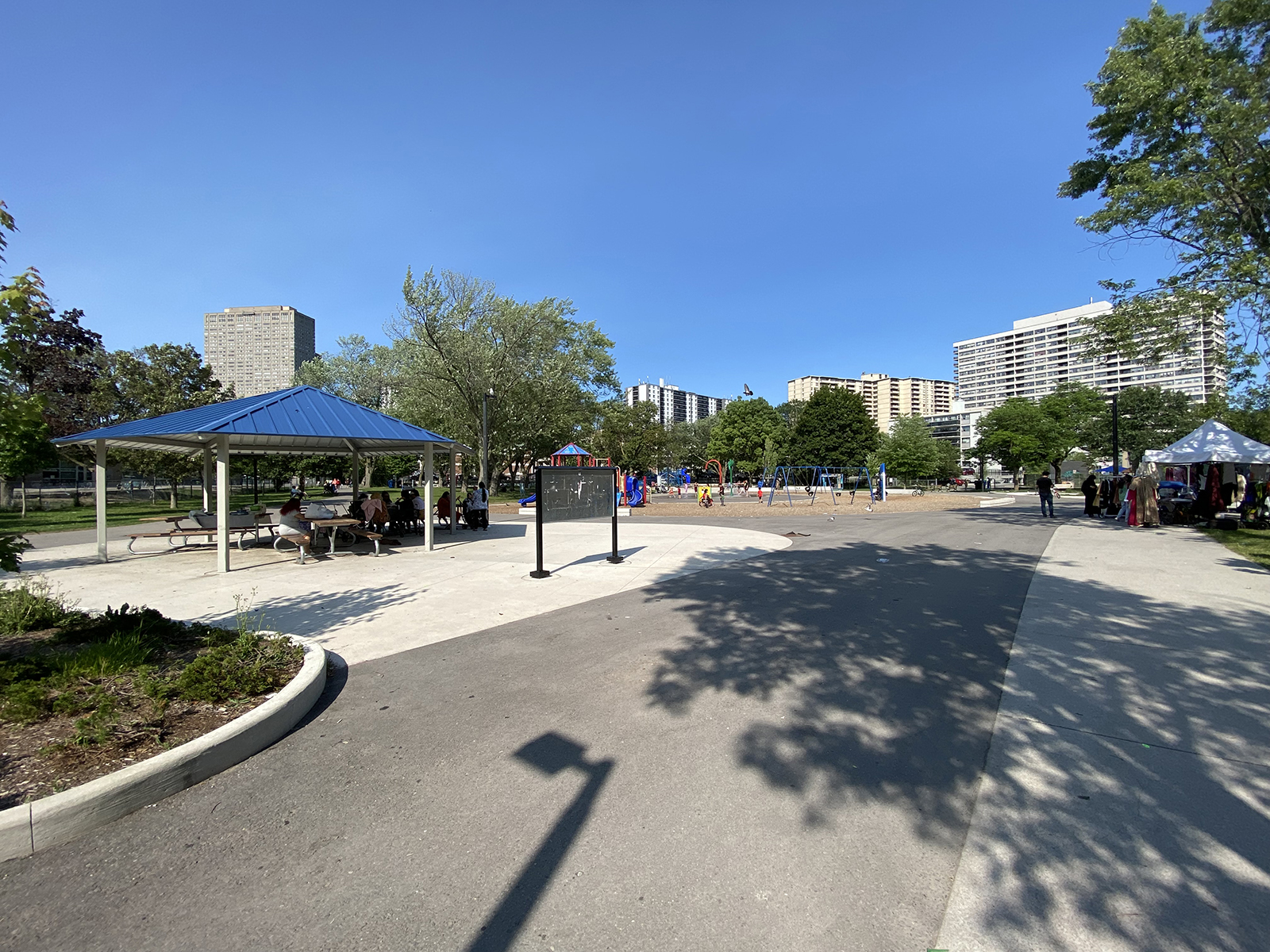
R.V. Burgess Park

Toronto Parks, Forestry & Recreation (PF&R) manages the Jenner Jean-Marie Community Centre and is responsible for the maintenance of R.V. Burgess Park, Leaside Park and Outdoor Pool, and E.T. Seton Park, which is a part of the Toronto Ravine System. The Thorncliffe branch of the Toronto Public Library operates in the neighbourhood. Leaside Park has been home to the Thorncliffe Park Tennis Club since the 1970s.

== In culture ==
The neighbourhood has been depicted in the films Arrowhead and Concrete Valley.

== Notable people ==
- Michael Bliss, historian, author and Officer of the Order of Canada.
- True Davidson, former mayor of East York.
- William Dennison, former mayor of Toronto.
- Peter Lynch, Canadian filmmaker.
- Robert Baird McClure, medical missionary and Moderator of the United Church of Canada.
- Beth Nealson, former mayor of Leaside.
- Alan Redway, former mayor of East York, and former Member of Parliament for Don Valley East and York East.
