= Toronto ravine system =

Geographical formations in Toronto, Canada

- Ravines
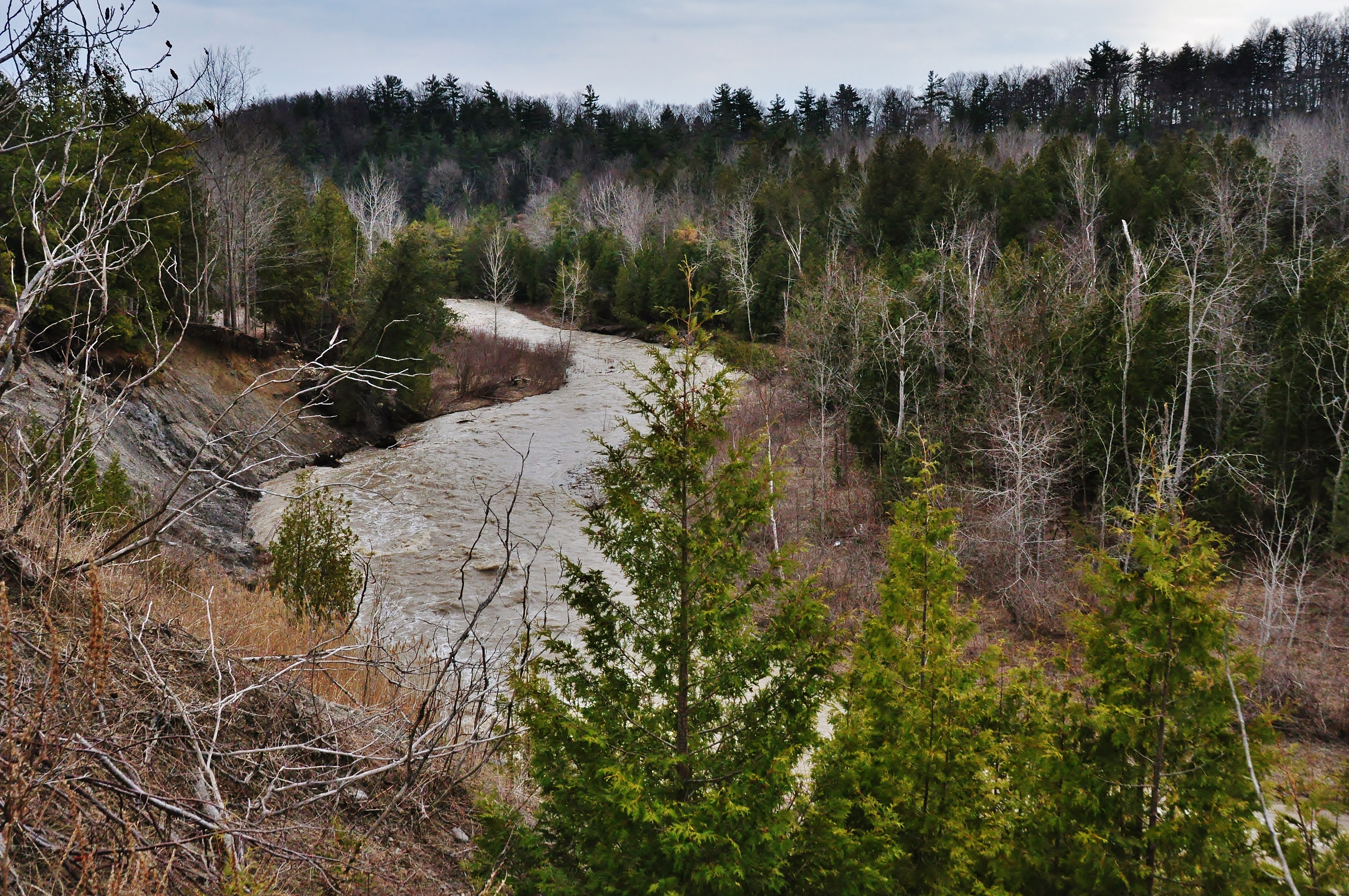
- Little Rouge Creek and the Rouge Valley, one of the ravines in the system
- Location: Toronto, Ontario, Canada
- Formed by: Erosion, receding glaciers

Area
  - Total: 110 square kilometres (42 sq mi) (Note: The following figure is the area protected under the Ravine and Natural Feature Protection Bylaw)
- Website: www.toronto.ca/explore-enjoy/parks-gardens-beaches/ravines-natural-parklands/

The Toronto ravine system is a distinctive feature of the city's geography, consisting of a network of deep ravines, which forms a large urban forest that runs through most of Toronto. The ravine system is the largest in any city in the world, with the Ravine and Natural Feature Protection Bylaw protecting approximately 110 square kilometres (42 sq mi) of public and privately owned land. The ravine system has been presented as a central characteristic of the city, with the size of the ravine system leading Toronto to be described as "a city within a park".

The ravine system began to take shape approximately 12,000 years ago at the end of the Last Glacial Period when the glaciers that once covered Toronto retreated northeast and left valleys and rivers that eventually formed deep ravines. Due to the topography of the ravine system, limited urban development occurred within it until the mid-19th century. Limited development continued in the ravine system until the occurrence of Hurricane Hazel in 1954. The destruction caused by the hurricane led to a halt to major developments within the ravine system. The Toronto ravine system remains largely undeveloped, with most of its public lands having been designated as parkland.

More than two-thirds of the publicly owned portions of the ravine system are made up of forests, with the other portions being beaches, meadows, open water, successional lands, and wetlands. Although large portions of the ravine system remain undeveloped, parts of the ravine system are used for flood management, carbon sequestration, and recreational purposes by the city. In addition to its human uses, the ravine system also serves as a habitat and wildlife corridor for a large number of animals.

== Origin ==
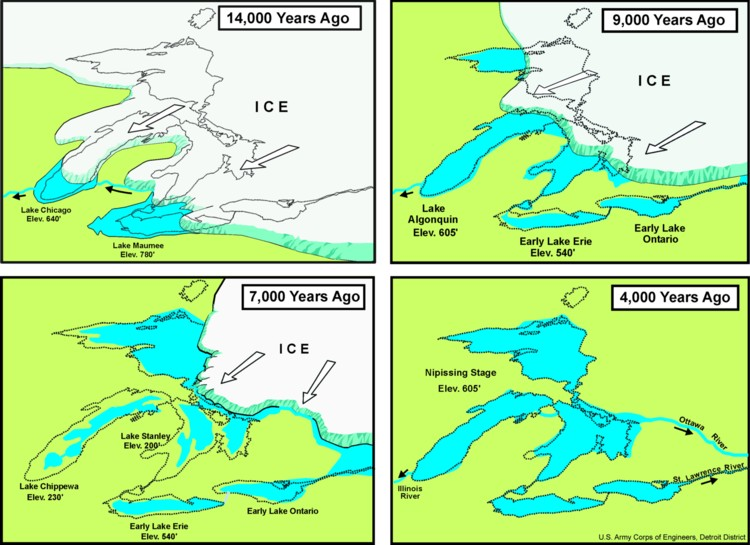
Development of the Great Lakes and the glacial retreat of the Laurentide Ice Sheet the end of the Last Glacial Period. The ravine valleys in Toronto were formed from the erosion of glacial meltwater.

The Toronto ravine system originated approximately 12,000 years ago at the end of the Last Glacial Period, with rivers and valleys being formed in the wake of the retreating glaciers and the compressed land it left. Meltwater from the glacial deposit at the Oak Ridges Moraine, situated 30 kilometres (19 mi) north of the city, flowed southeast towards Glacial Lake Iroquois, carving through nearly 100 metres (330 ft) of soil, alluvial soft sand, gravel, and clay till to form the ravine valleys. Most of the meltwater flowed southeast along shallow ice-scrapped depressions towards the glacial lake, creating small ponds north of Toronto. However, the early Don and Humber rivers are notable exceptions, with these waterways flowing along the compacted channels of the former Laurentian River System, an ancient river system that was scoured and buried during the Last Glacial Period.

After the glacial ice had retreated north of the St. Lawrence Valley approximately 9,000 years ago, the water level of glacial Lake Iroquois began to recede. The drop in water levels saw new waterways formed as the water meandered through the former lakebed into the newly formed Lake Admiralty, with the two main branches of the Don River joined at the old shoreline of Lake Iroquois, and new streams having been formed. The new lake existed until approximately 8,000 years ago, when the Earth's crust around Quebec and northeastern Ontario began to rebound, having been previously depressed under the weight of the glacial ice that had since retreated from that area. Water levels in the lake gradually rose as the earth's crust near the lake's outlet to the Saint Lawrence River rebounded. Major plateaus in the system, such as the lower Don Valley, were formed during this period, as rising water levels from Lake Ontario pushed into the lower valley, and sediment washed down from the upper valley accumulated in the lower waterbed. The flooding of the lower ravine system also resulted in the formation of several spits, lagoons, and wetlands near Toronto's shoreline.

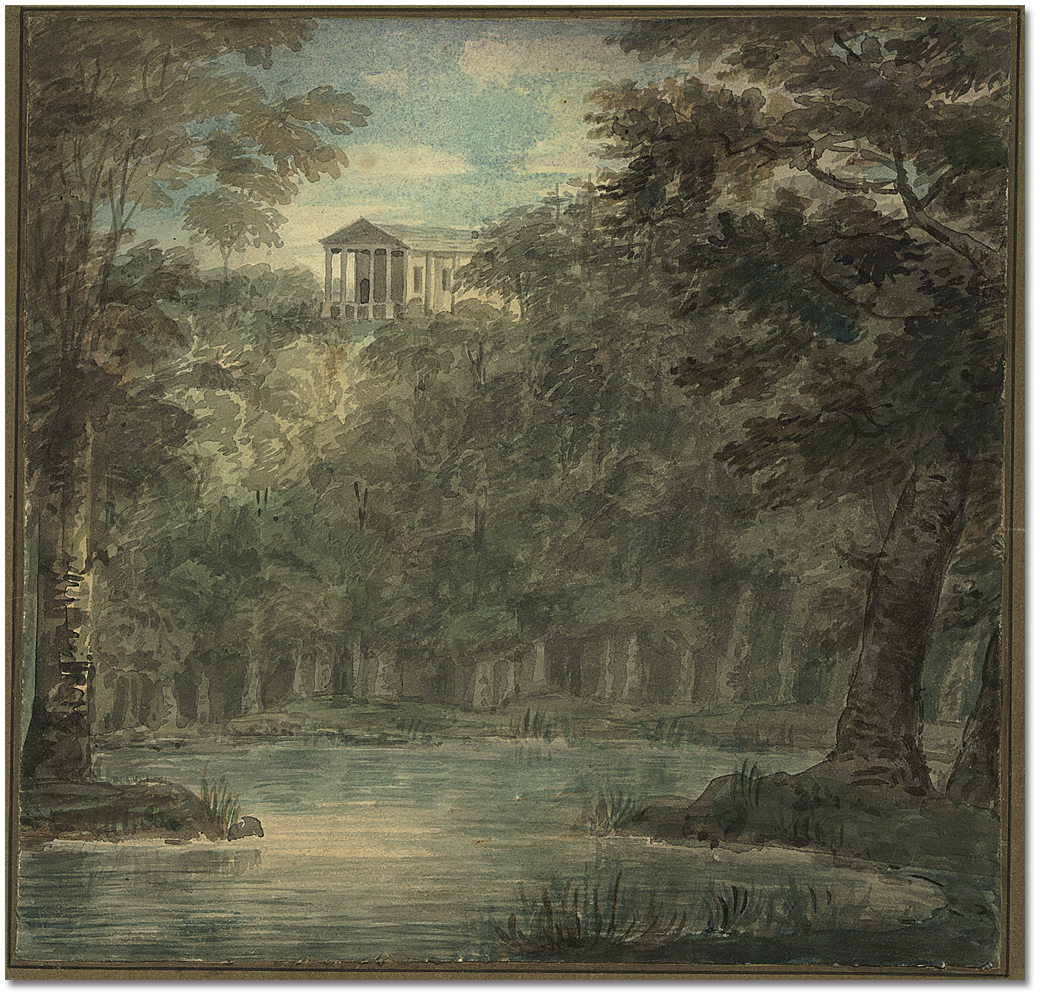
Depiction of Castle Frank Brook in 1796. The waterway was one of several in the ravine system that was later buried by the 20th century.

Before the arrival of European settlers, the landscape from Lake Ontario to the Oak Ridge Moraine was dominated by forests of maple, beech, and hemlock trees, while its low-lying areas were made up of forests and shrub swamps, with extensive marches along the Toronto shoreline. A large number of the trees surrounding the Town of York were logged in the early 19th century, including many trees in the ravine system. However, portions of the ravine system saw limited human developments, with flood-prone areas of the ravine having prevented large-scale urban developments. As a result, the ravine system holds the largest collection of trees in the city that predates European colonization.

The ravine system also saw significant alterations as a result of human activity in the 19th and early 20th centuries, as several natural valleys were filled in, rivers rechannelled or buried entirely, and wetlands drained to facilitate new developments. The Don River was altered near the mouth of the river, with a concrete channel created to prevent the Port Lands from flooding. Creeks and ravines within downtown Toronto were also buried during this period, including Garrison and Taddle Creek. As a result of these changes, the Don River and a small portion of Taddle Creek were the only remaining waterways that flowed into Toronto Bay by the mid-20th century. The surviving portions of Toronto's ravine system primarily surround four waterways—the Don River, Highland Creek, Humber River, and the Rouge River—although smaller ravines can also be found along the other waterways of Toronto, including Etobicoke Creek and Mimico Creek.

== Locations ==
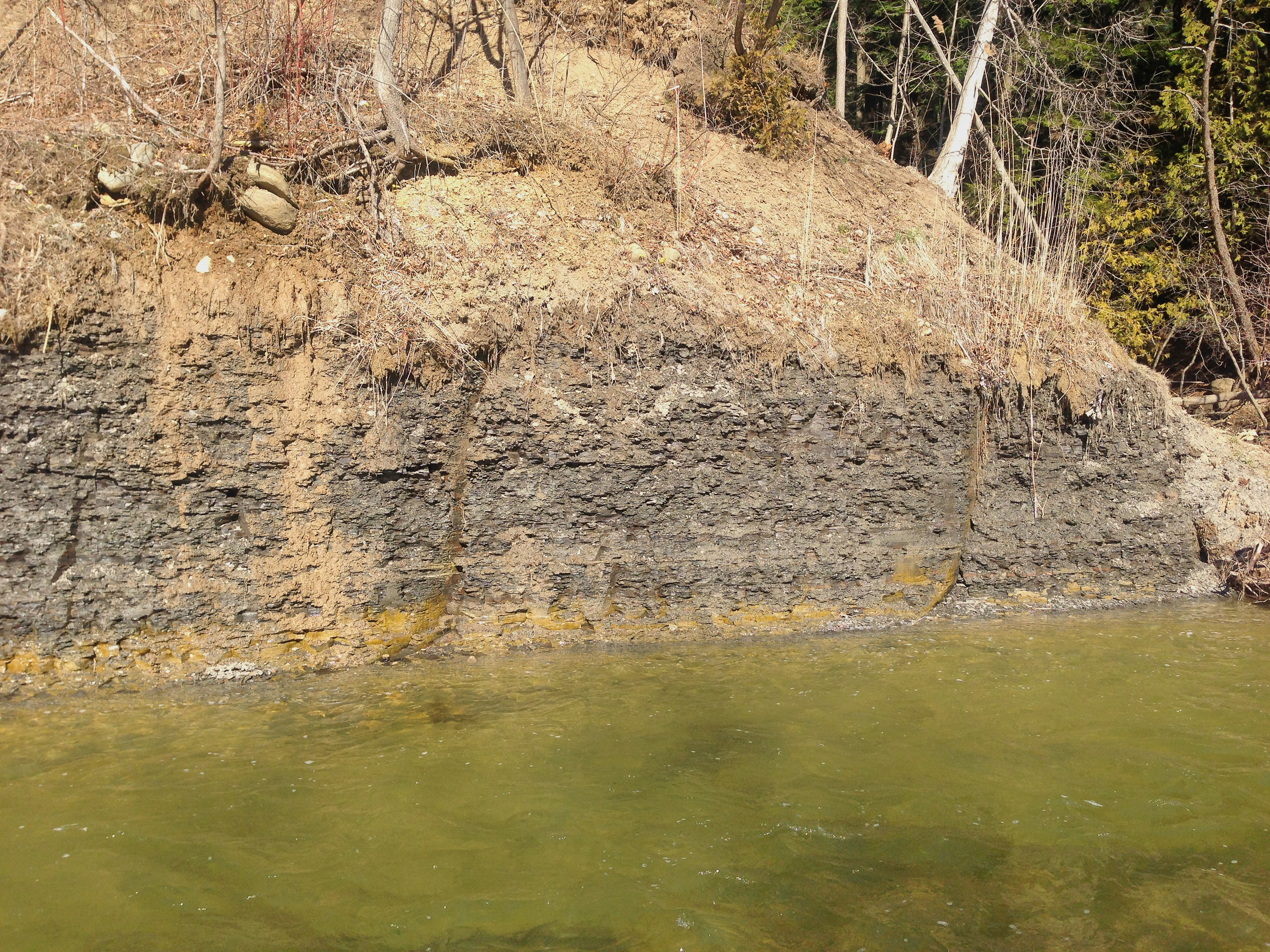
The Blue Mountain Formation along Little Rouge Creek. The formation dates back to the Ordovician age.

The ravine system is situated on the north shore of Lake Ontario, straddling the Carolinian forest and the Great Lakes–St. Lawrence Lowlands. The landscape of the ravine system includes large river valleys and smaller creeks. Many of the larger waterways are surrounded by narrow steep-sided valleys, with the waterways having eroded the soft deposits around it to reveal large exposures of Ordovician rocks, many of these rocks visible along the stream banks. The ravine system forms a part of a larger network of ravines that extends towards the Oak Ridges Moraine, located north of Toronto. The largest ravines surround the rivers running south from the moraine towards Lake Ontario, the Don, Humber, and Rouge rivers.

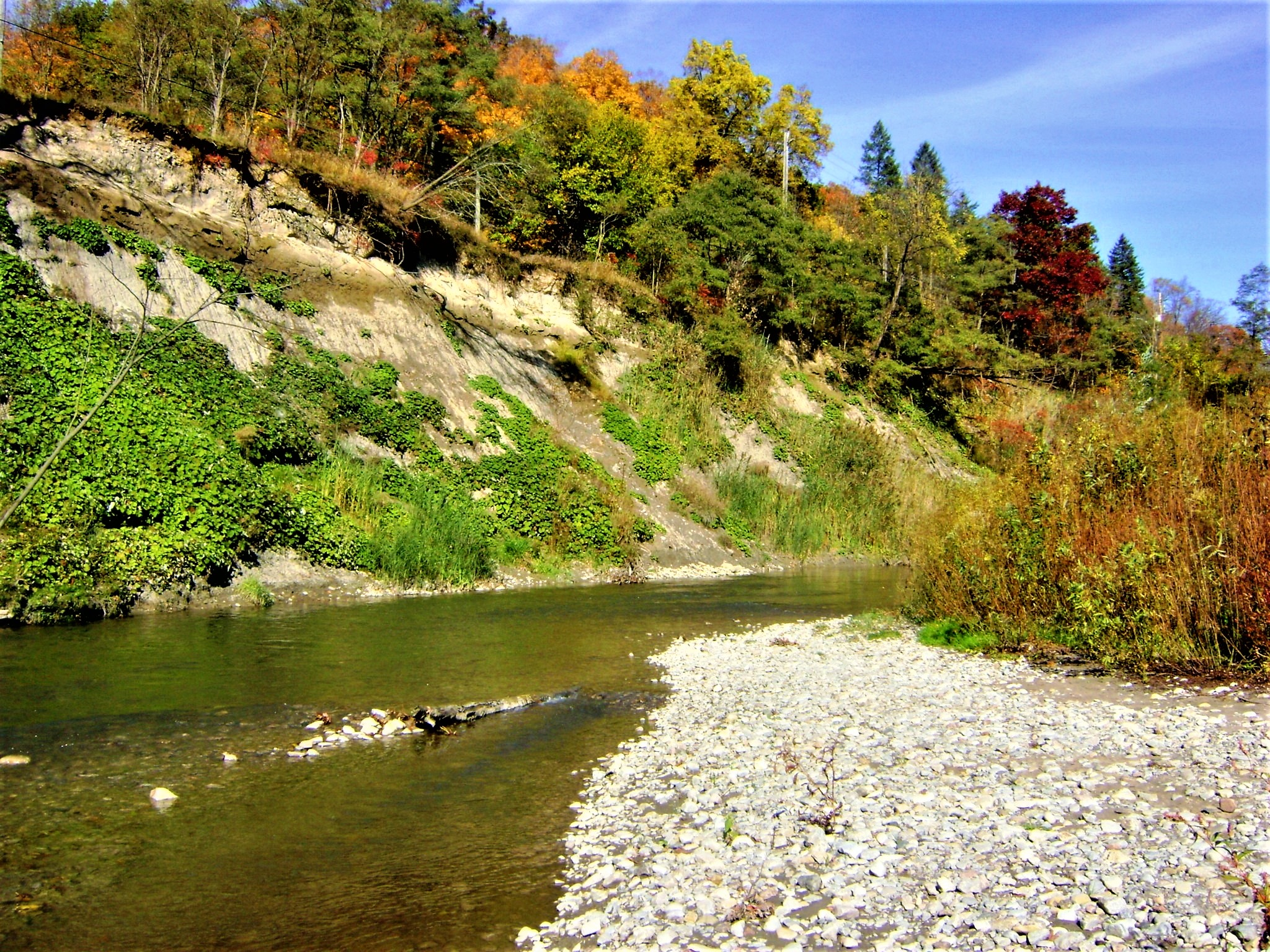
The Rouge River and its river bank. Large waterways in the ravine system are surrounded by steep-sided valleys.

The present ravine system is a protected natural landform under the Ravine and Natural Feature Protection Bylaw. The bylaw defines a ravine as a distinct landform with a minimum of 2 metres (6.6 ft) change in grade between "the highest and lowest points of elevation," has vegetation cover, and has or once had water flowing through or adjacent to the landform. In addition to these landforms, buffer areas and some other environmentally significant areas are also covered under this act. In total, the act protects approximately 17 per cent of the land in the city, or about 11,000 hectares (27,000 acres) of land. The system contains at least 150 ravines, constituting the largest ravine system in any city in the world. The edge of the ravine system throughout the city collectively amounts to over 1,200 kilometres (750 mi), ten times the length of the Toronto waterfront. The system is primarily surrounded by residential areas.

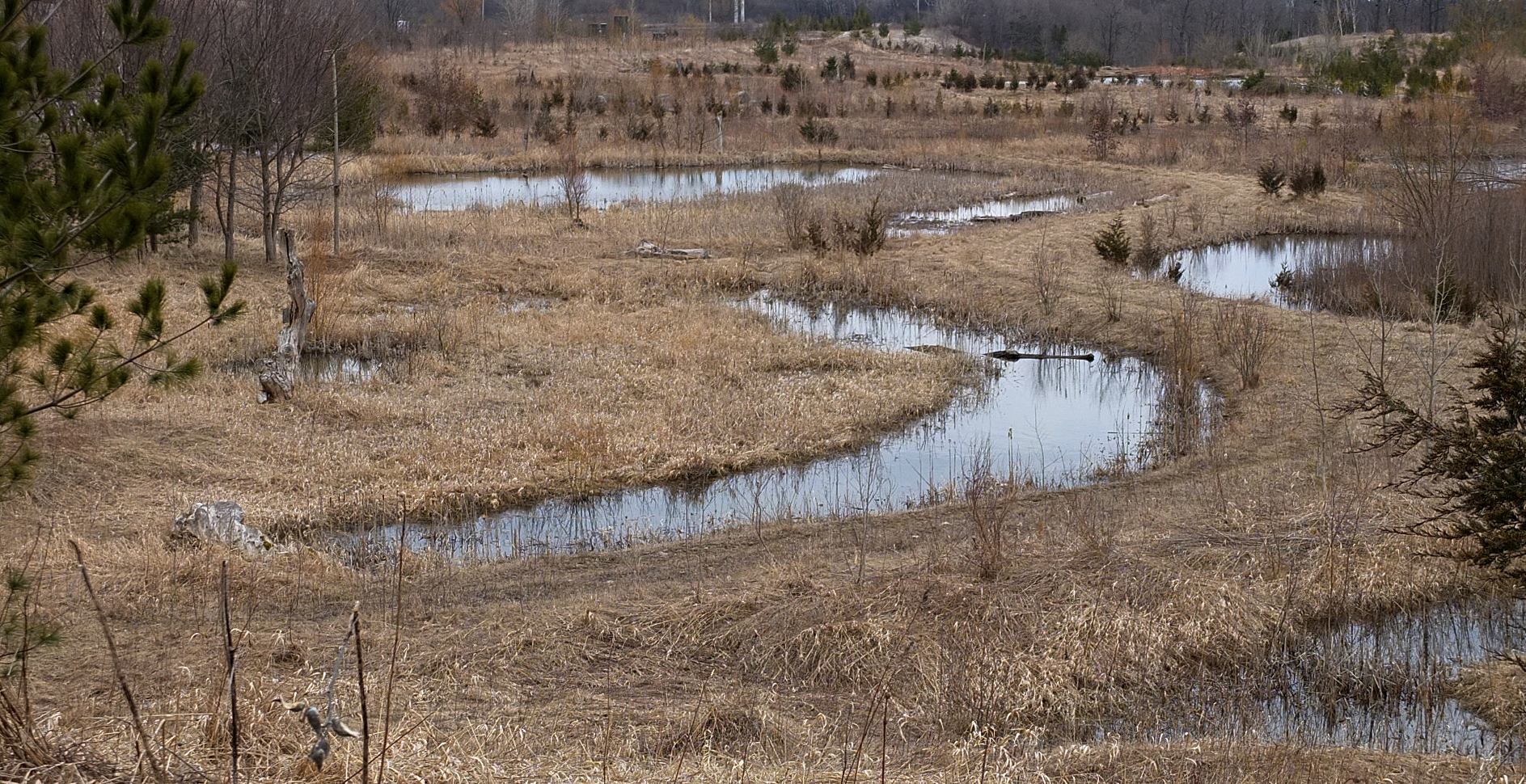
Wetlands near the Rouge River

Approximately 60 per cent of the protected land is publicly owned, whereas the remaining 40 per cent is held privately. Within this area there are 86 municipally recognized "Environmentally Significant Areas" and 1,500 urban parks. Most of the ravine system remains in a naturalized state for flood control purposes, given the high variability in the water levels of the rivers and streams. More than two-thirds of the publicly owned portions of the ravine system are forests, with its remaining portions being beaches, meadows, open water, successional lands, and wetlands. The ravine system accounts for approximately 36 per cent of the city's total tree cover.

Nearly the entire ravine system forms a part of the city's green space and natural heritage system, with municipal bylaws for those areas largely restricting human developments, with exceptions for compatible recreational and cultural facilities and essential public works. Legal ordinances that restrict developments within the ravine system include the Ravine and Natural Feature Protection Bylaw, which restricts the destruction of any tree in the system without a permit from the city, and TRCA Regulation 166/06, which prohibits any man-made alterations or filling of the ravine system's waterways or wetlands without a permit from the Toronto and Region Conservation Authority (TRCA).

=== Waterways ===
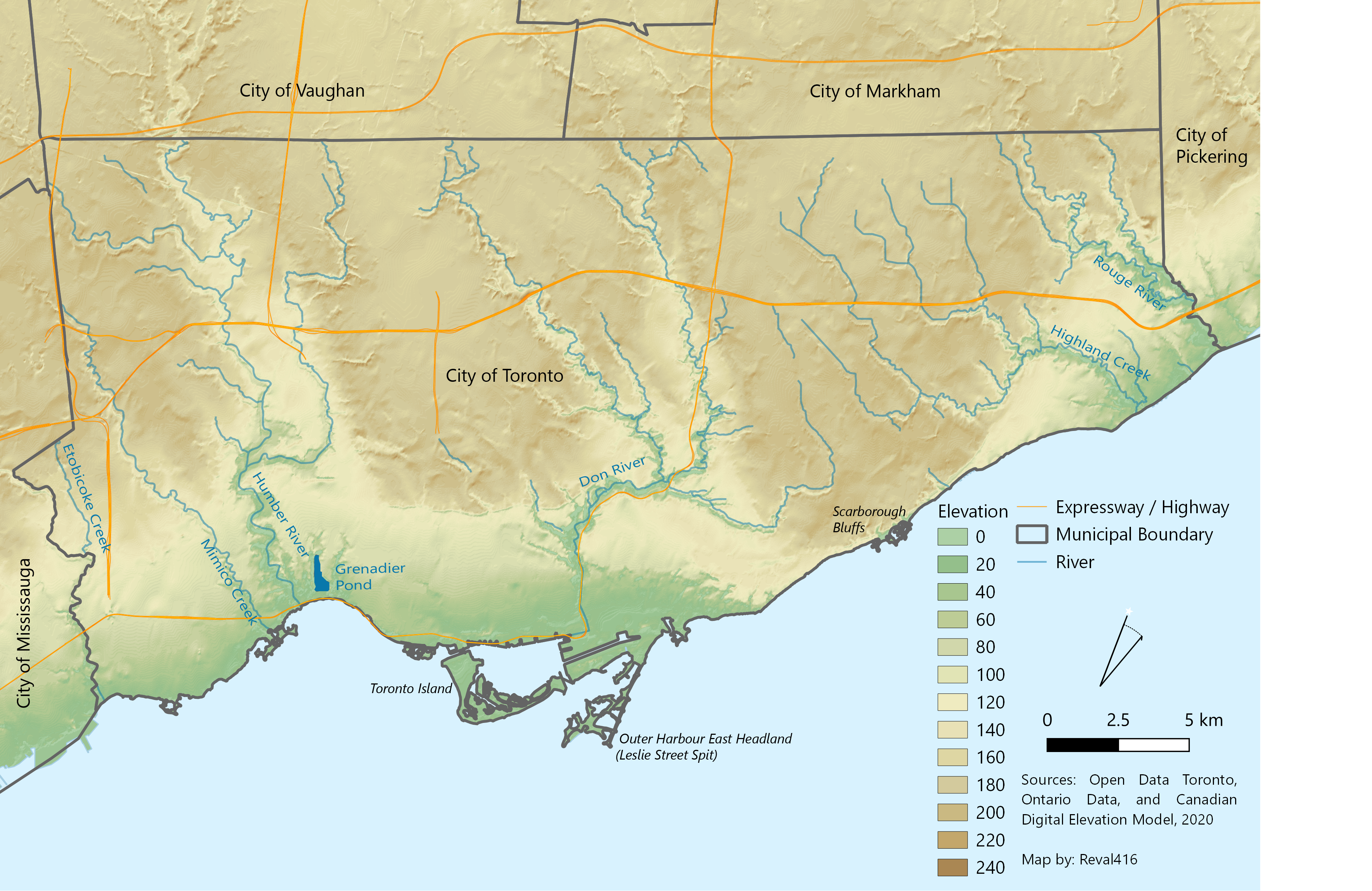
Topographical map of Toronto and its waterway system. Most of the ravine system surrounds these waterways.

The Toronto ravine system forms a part of a larger regional watershed system that encompasses the Golden Horseshoe Greenbelt and the Oak Ridges Moraine. The ravine system contains seven watersheds, the Don River, Etobicoke Creek, Highland Creek, Humber River, Mimico Creek, Petticoat Creek, and the Rouge River. The Humber watershed is the largest of the seven watersheds, although the Don watershed constitutes the largest percentage of the city's land area, making up 32.5 per cent of the city. In total, there is approximately 371 kilometres (231 mi) of watercourses that flow through the city and its ravine.

Most of the smaller creeks and streams are situated within the city limits of Toronto, although the source for the larger three rivers of the ravine system, the Don, Humber, and Rouge, originates from the Oak Ridges Moraine, a moraine located north of the city. The point where the Humber, Don, and Rouge River watersheds meet is near the intersection of Bathurst Street and Jefferson Sideroad at the Vaughan-Richmond Hill boundary.

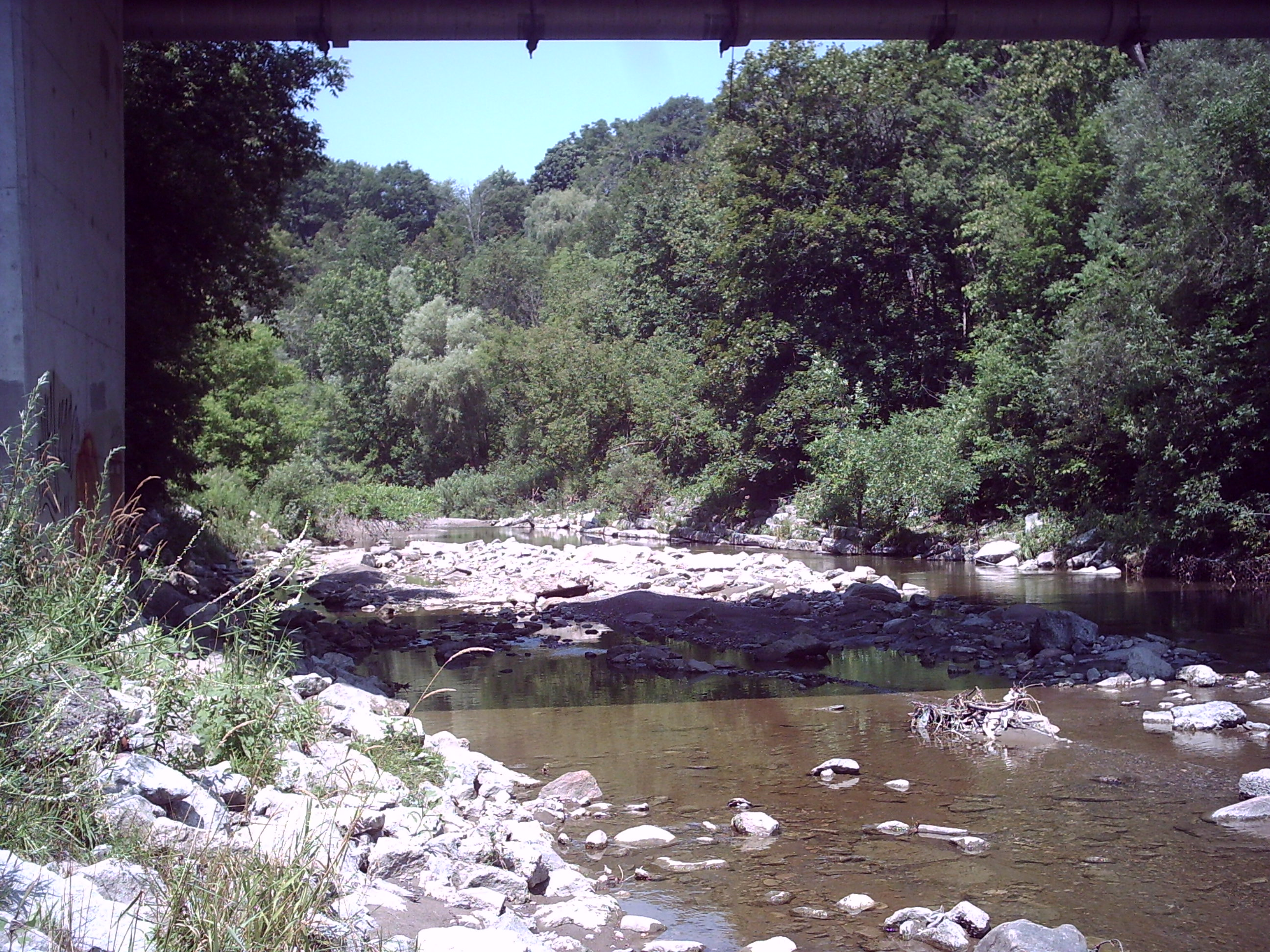
Low water levels at Highland Creek, July 2007

Many of the ravines that surround these waterways branch off into smaller ravines, winding through commercial, industrial, and residential neighbourhoods of the city. During the late summer, many of the smaller streams will slow to a trickle or even disappear completely. During the spring and after major storms, creeks in the ravine will often overflow their banks. The shape of streams within the ravine system is subject to constant change, with large storms causing the area to flood, and erosion to occur on river banks and meanders. In particular, waterways in narrow ravines, and straightened/rechannelled waterways are particularly susceptible to change due to erosion.

As a result of heavy urbanization around Black Creek, the water quality of the creek is considerably lower in comparison to the other watersheds of the ravine system.

== Biodiversity ==
The ravine system holds the greatest variety of ecosystems, species and genetic diversity within the city. The variety in species is a result of the mosaic of ecosystems that exists within the system, including forests, wetlands, rivers and streams. The connected nature of these habitats helps support the extensive biodiversity within ravines.

=== Fauna ===
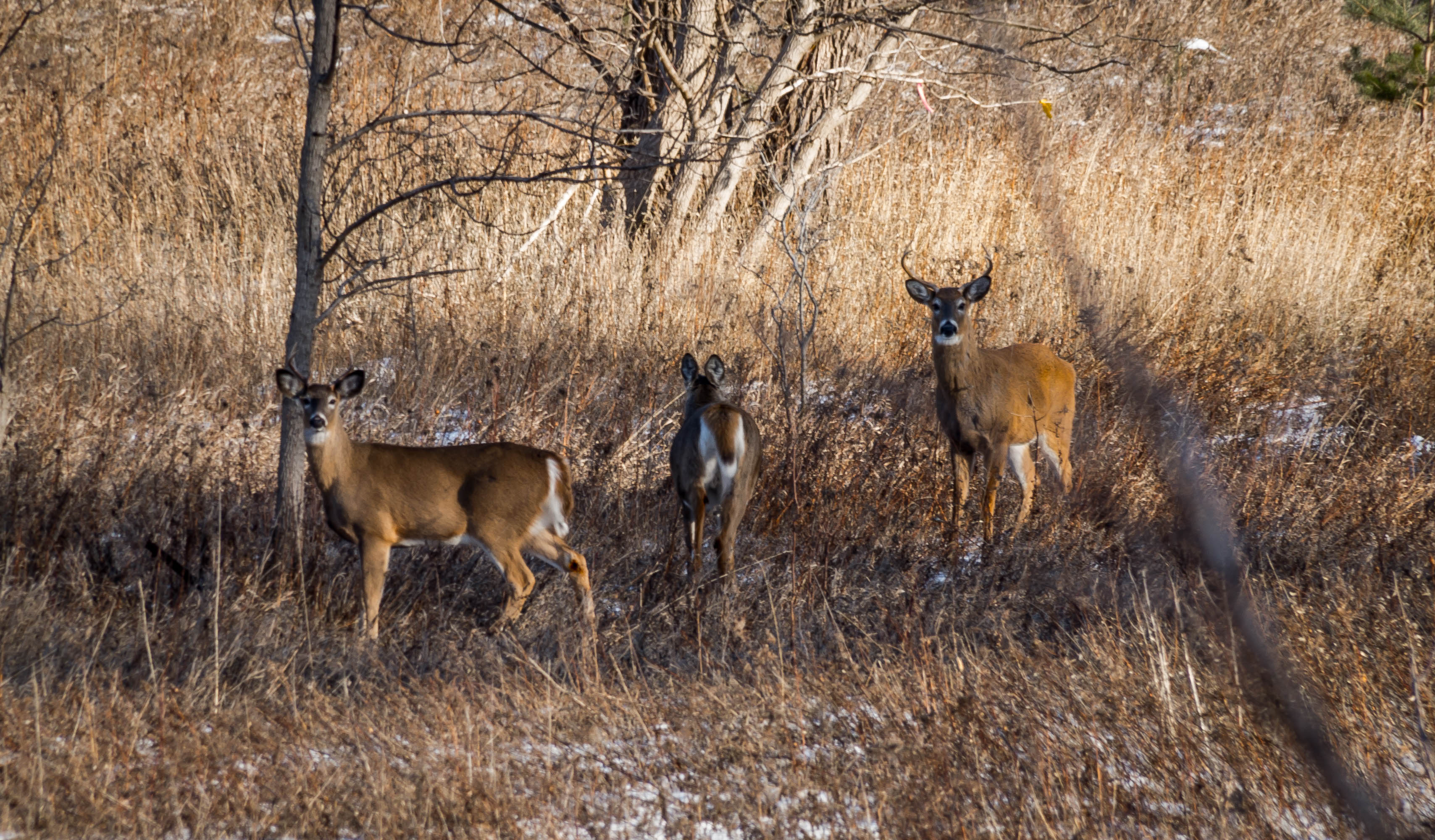
White-tailed deer at Rouge National Urban Park. The ravine system holds a large majority of the wildlife that inhabits Toronto.

The ravine system serves as a habitat for approximately 1,700 species of animals and plants, including many locally, regionally, and provincially sensitive species and species at risk. Approximately 90 per cent of animals that reside in Toronto inhabit the ravine system.

In addition to providing a habitat in an urban environment, the ravine system also acts as a wildlife corridor, permitting the animals that live within it to travel from one area of the city to another. The corridors are of particular importance for wild mammals, as they provide the only safe passage for them to traverse from one part of the city to another to find new mates and establish their own homes.

=== Flora ===
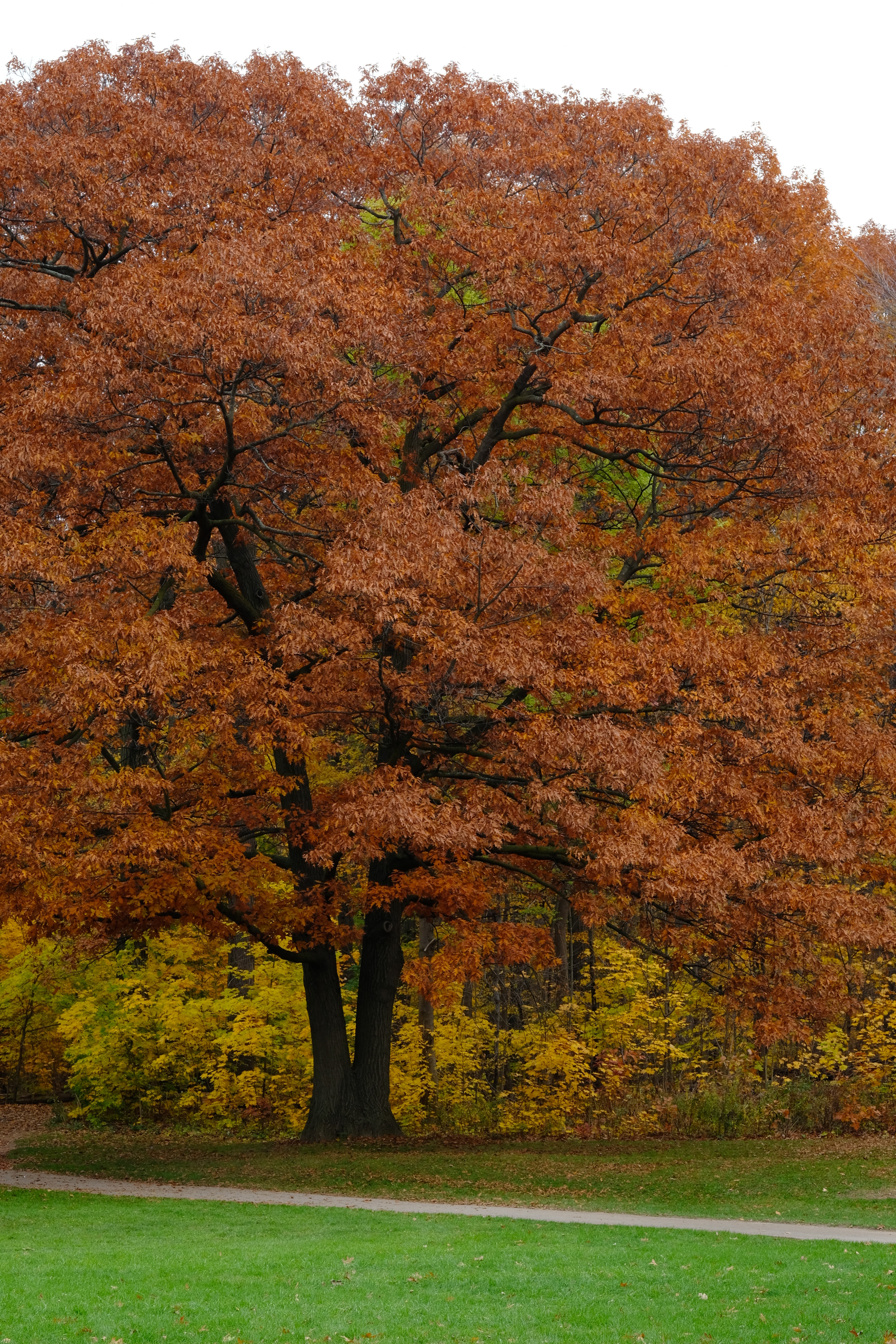
A northern red oak in Magwood Park in the Etobicoke River valley. The tree is one of several tree species native to the ravine system.

The ravine system is one of the northernmost Carolinian forests found in North America, consisting of mixed woodlands and southern traces of the boreal forest. Around 1,000 plant species may be found in the ravine system, making up approximately 25 per cent of all plant species that can be found in Ontario.

Most flora that is native to the area, such as the oak, have the genetic diversity that makes them more adaptable and resilient to extreme climate events and pest infestations. Poison ivy and nettles are also abundant.

==== Invasive species ====
A decline in the quality of vegetation composition was observed between 2009 and 2019, with invasive plant species spreading throughout the ravine system.

In a 2018 study on the ravine system's ecology, at least one of 15 identified high-risk invasive plant species was found in 75 per cent of areas surveyed. The study also indicated that the native flora in the ravine system faced extirpation if action was not taken against the invasive flora, with certain invasive species such as the Norway maple seizing large portions of the ravine system by killing off native undergrowth and saplings. Norway maples were a species that out-competed native vegetation.

== Human history ==
Several artifacts dating to the Archaic period in North America have been found in the ravine system. After the introduction of corn in southern Ontario circa 500 CE, the ancestral Wendat peoples began to raise the crop by clearing the floodplains. By the 14th century, the area held several Wendat and Petun communities around the Don, Humber, and Rouge drainage system. The large amount of timber needed to house these communities was typically extracted from nearby cedar swamps. However by the end of the 16th century, most of these communities had moved northward to other Petun and Huron communities around present-day Simcoe County.

The areas was later occupied by the Seneca in the 1600s, with early European explorers having noted the existence of a Seneca village on the Humber, and another on the Rouge rivers in the 1660s.

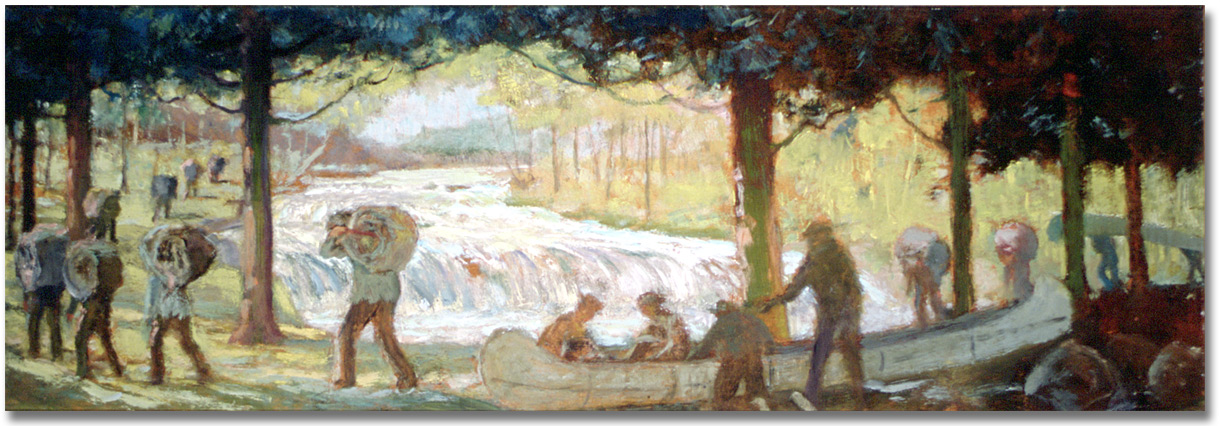
Travellers on the Toronto Carrying-Place Trail. The route extended from Lake Ontario to the upper Great Lakes.

The first Europeans to arrive in the area were primarily explorers, fur traders, and missionaries, with a French Sulpician mission established at the mouth of the Rouge River by 1669. From the 17th century to 19th century, the ravine system formed a part of the Toronto Carrying-Place Trail, a major canoe-and-portage route used by fur traders to reach the upper Great Lakes.

The first sawmill opened in Toronto at the Don River valley in 1795. Due to the limited lumber supply the British had during the Napoleonic Wars, and the abundance of old-growth pines in the ravine system, portions of the Rouge Valley were logged to support the Royal Navy's shipbuilding efforts. From the late-18th and 19th century, portions of the ravine system was logged for building materials, leaving few trees in Toronto that date to before the end of logging around 1850.

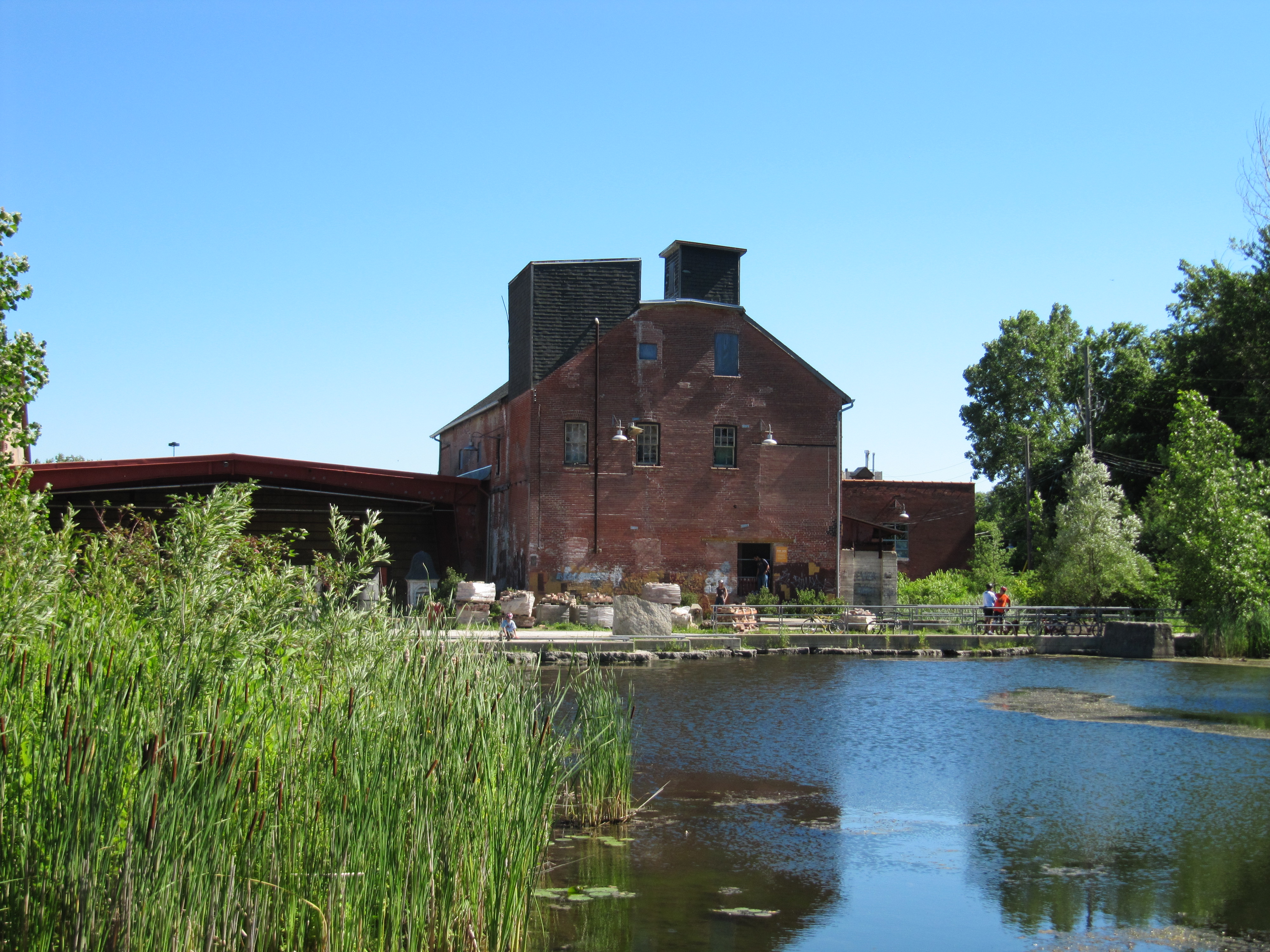
The Don Valley Brick Works within the Don River valley, 2010. The brickworks supplied building materials for the city until 1984.

From the late 18th to 20th century, clay was also extracted from the ravine system, with the first brickworks opened in the ravine system in 1796. The Don Valley Brick Works was major brickwork that served as a major quarry and source of building material for the city until 1984. Clay excavations at the Don Valley Brick Works have provided researchers with the best-known preserved interglacial record in northern North America.

Urban developments within the ravines were largely limited in the early 19th century, as the muddy glacial sediment that made up the ravine valley acted as a major obstacle to construction. However, the cleared portions of the ravine system saw several dump sites, farms, mills, and landscaped parks established in the 19th and 20th centuries. By the mid-19th century, the Don Valley gained a reputation as a "space for undesirables," with residents of the city perceiving the ravine as an area that harboured and facilitated lawlessness. The perception of the ravine system during the mid-19th century led developers to build low-end neighbourhoods near the ravine system, an area situated on the periphery of 19th-century Toronto and near its industrial lands.

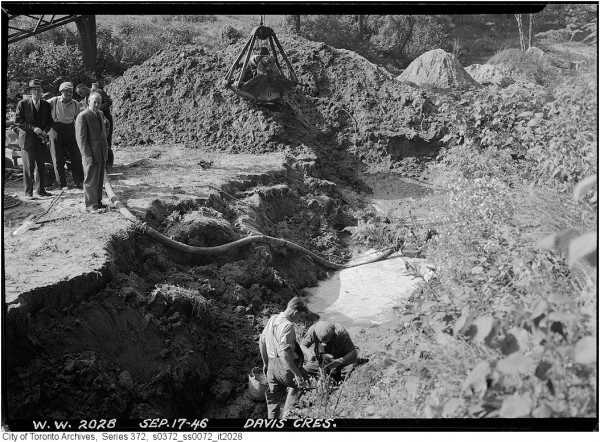
A pool of water forming over a buried Tomlin's Creek, 1946

During the late 19th century several wetlands and lagoons at the mouths of the Don River were infilled, as the shallowness of Ashbride's Marsh made the area optimal for redevelopment as the Port Lands. The Don River around the river's mouth was also straightened to attract shipping upriver. Some smaller waterways in Toronto were also buried during this period after public health officials prompted the municipal government to cover the smaller waterways being used by residents as a receptacle for trash and human waste. The city's sewage system and water filtration plant was also built into the ravine system during the late-19th century. Many of Toronto's storm drains continue to empty into the ravines, with large parts of the city's infrastructure still reliant on the ravine system to absorb and filter stormwater in case of overflow.

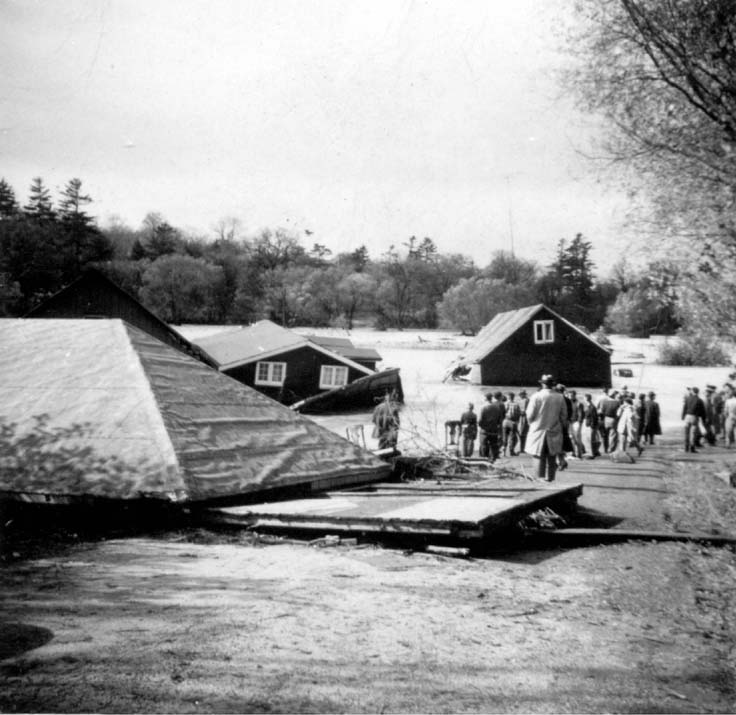
Several houses situated near the Humber River are flooded after Hurricane Hazel passed through the area, October 1954.

By the mid-1950s, several plans had emerged to create public parks within the ravine system and protect the system from further human development. Developments in the ravine system were largely halted after Hurricane Hazel passed through Toronto in 1954, with the hurricane destroying many homes and leaving 1,868 families homeless. Many of the homes that were destroyed were situated in the rechannelled rivers and streams of the ravine system, areas already threatened by flooding from heavy rainfalls.

The TRCA was formed under the provincial Conservation Authorities Act as a result of Hurricane Hazel. The TRCA established several flood control and water management policies that saw major developments halted within the ravine system. This included creating a boundary to delineate the high water mark for the ravine's rivers, as well as a ban on construction within the boundary. The formation of the TRCA marked the ravine system as a volatile force that would be managed under an intensive set of developmental constraints. As a result, most of the existing ravine system from 1954 has been preserved, with the construction of the Don Valley Parkway being the only major exception.

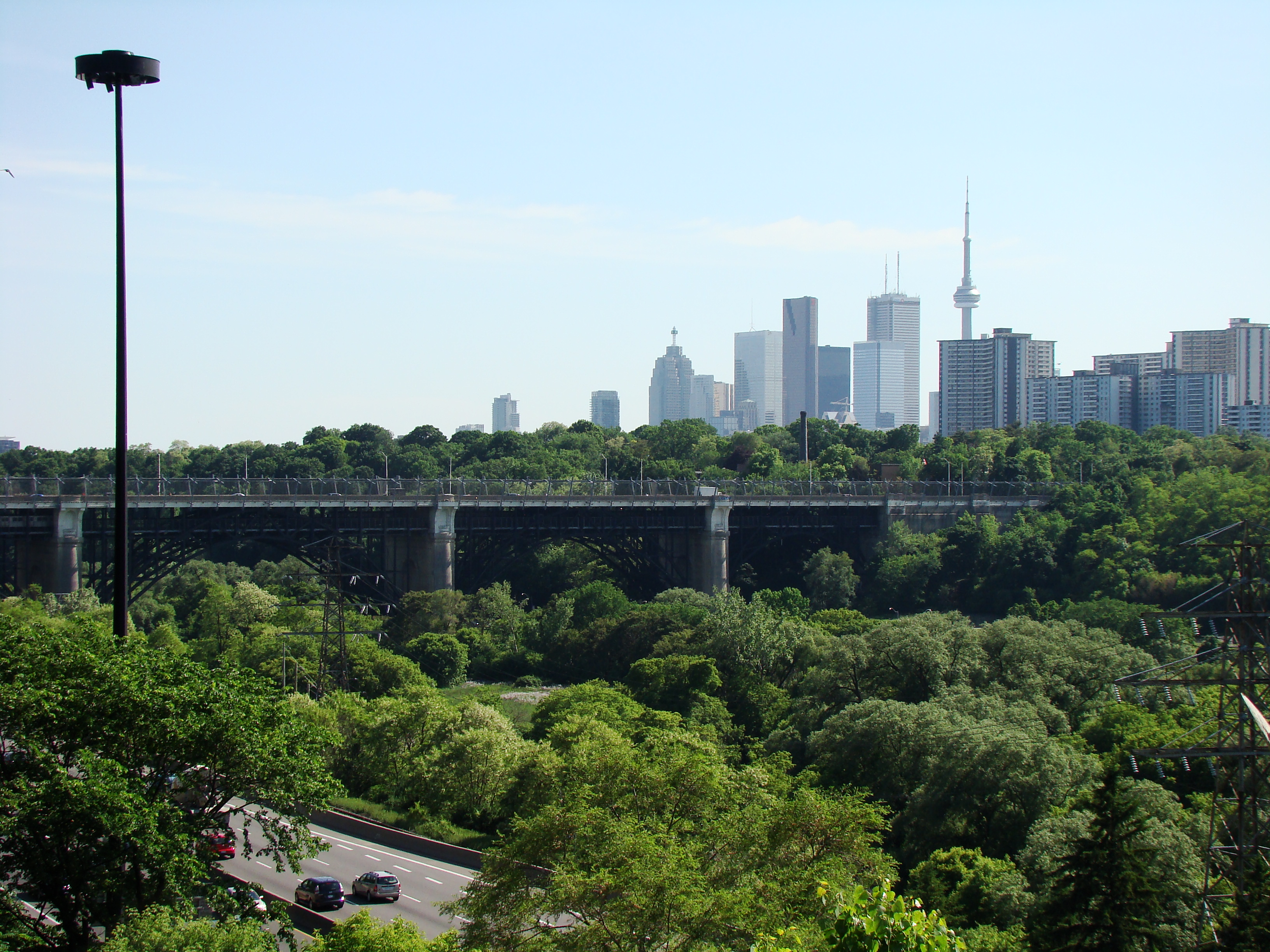
The Don River valley with Prince Edward Viaduct overhead the Don Valley Parkway. The highway would be the last major development in the ravine system.

The municipal government proceeded with its plan to create several parks in the ravine system, although they were built further upstream, adjacent to the TRCA's designated reservoirs and watersheds. Efforts to restore the ravine system to its natural state were launched in the 1990s, with citizen task forces such as the Task Force to Bring Back the Don formed to help facilitate tree planting and wetland creation projects.

=== 21st century ===
In 2002, the municipal government of Toronto enacted a bylaw to formally protect the ravine system from human development.

The ravines were also home to a considerable number of homeless people, some of them living in fairly elaborate temporary structures. In 2001, The Globe and Mail ran a three-part series titled "The Outsiders" tracing the life of the homeless residents of the ravines for nearly a year. It won a National Newspaper Award for best feature writing. During the 2000s, illegal dumping of garbage in the ravines became an issue for forestry officials in the city.

A report published in 2018 estimated that the ravine system provided the city with C$822 million in eco-system services in 2017. Eco-services provided by the ravine include aesthetics, carbon sequestration, flood mitigation, the regulation of temperature and noise, and recreation. In the report, it was estimated that the ravine system is responsible for the sequestration of 14,542 tonnes of carbon per year.

Work on new bypass tunnels to capture combined sewer overflows and prevent their flow into the Don River and Lake Ontario was undertaken beginning in December 2019. The bypass tunnels will divert overflows to Ashbridges Bay Wastewater Treatment Plant for ultraviolet disinfection.

== Recreational use ==
The Humber River at Raymore Park, one of many parks within the Toronto ravine system

Although the ravines were designated as an open space that is publicly accessible, only small sections of it are dedicated as parkland and sanctioned for public use. The municipal government's official ravine strategy identifies the ravine system as areas that should be preserved in their natural state. As a result, recreational activities within the ravine system have been limited to passive recreational activities, including cycling, hiking, and cross-country skiing within the ravine's parks and trails. There exist approximately 1,500 urban parks within the ravine system.

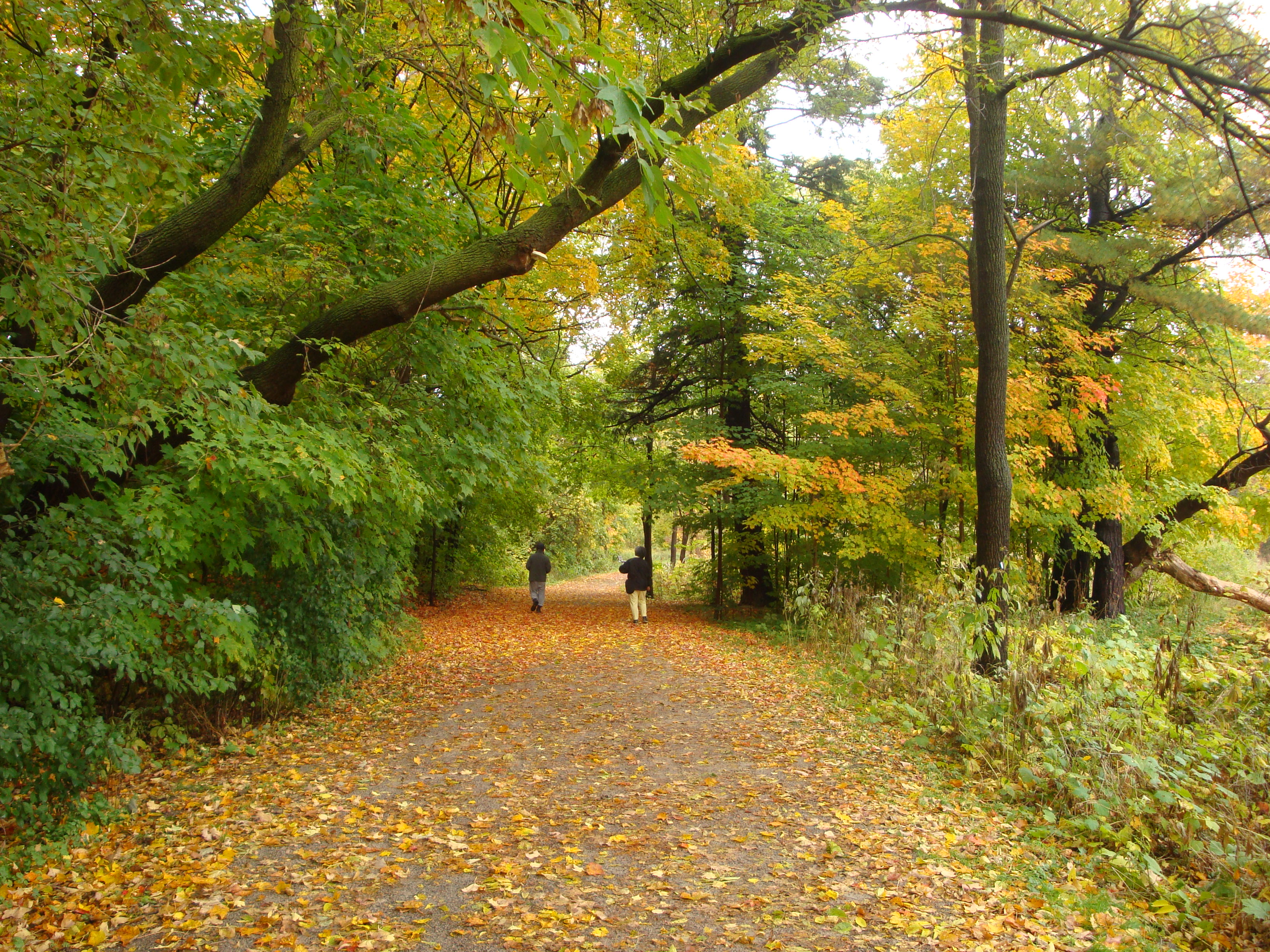
Etobicoke Creek Trail at Centennial Park. The trail is one of several that exist in Toronto's ravine system.

In addition to small local parks, larger urban parks that encompass large portions of the ravine system have also been established during the 2010s. In 2011, the federal government announced its intention to create a national park around the Rouge River watershed. To establish the national park, the land was transferred from the municipal governments of Toronto and the surrounding municipalities to Parks Canada, with Rouge National Urban Park formally established on 15 May 2015. As of July 2019, the park has incorporated 95 per cent of the 79.1 square kilometres (30.5 sq mi) of land committed to it by the municipal, provincial, and federal governments. The Don River Valley Park is another large park in the ravine system opened by the municipal government. The Don River Valley Park encompasses over 200 hectares (490 acres) of the lower Don River valley from Pottery Road to Corktown Common. The creation of the Don River Valley Park formed a part of the larger Lower Don Master Plan, a plan to naturally restore the area.

In 2017, the city introduced new trail signage to provide information for the surrounding area, initially on the trails of the lower Don River. There were 924,486 hikers and 398,240 cyclists who used the trails in the Toronto ravine system in 2017. The heavy use of some trails remains an issue for conservation efforts, with these trails showing signs of accelerated erosion and disruption to wildlife.

Certain parts of the ravines are also known as gay cruising areas.

=== Issues with access ===
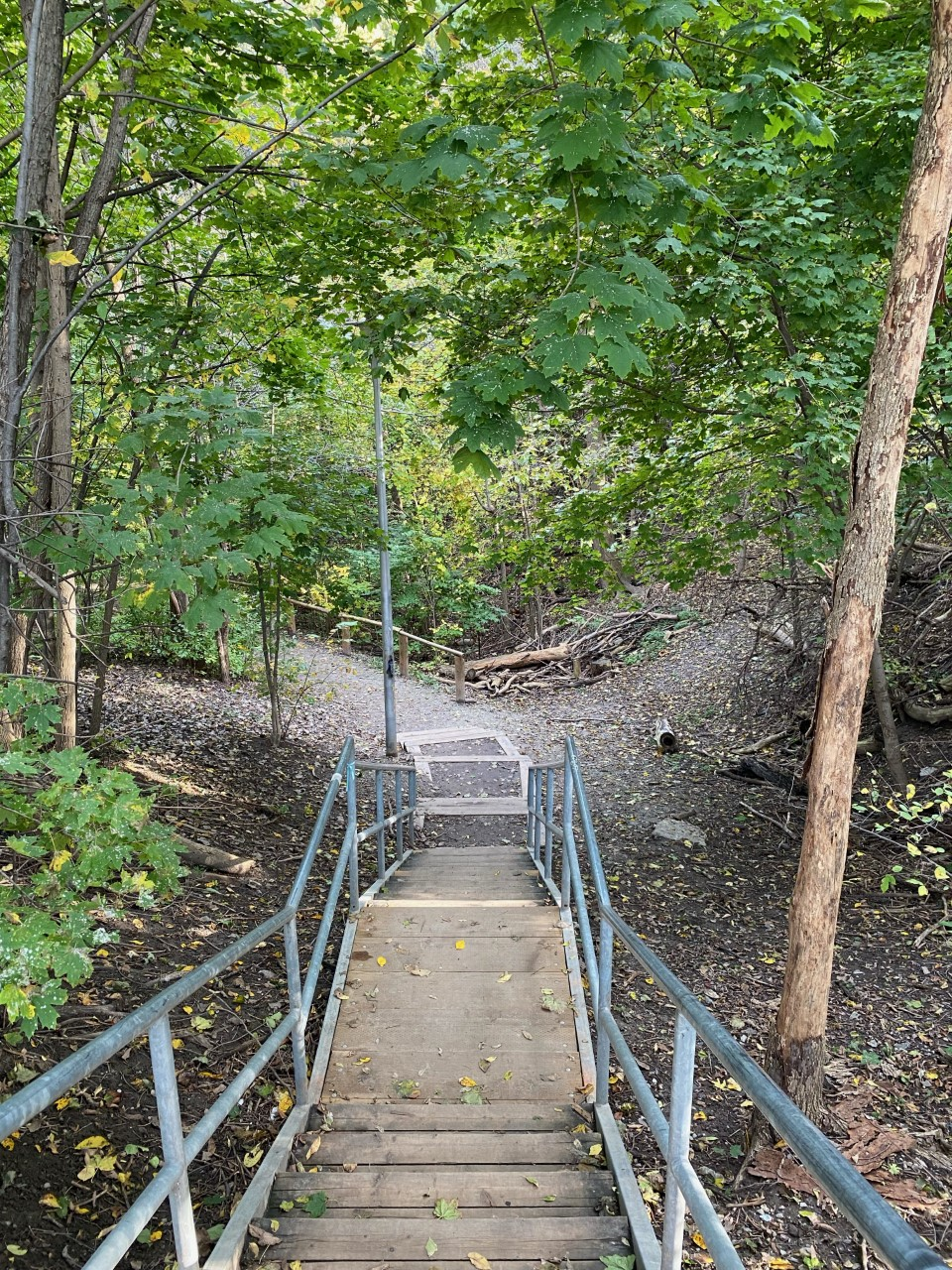
Stairway entrance to Nordheimer Ravine. Access to some ravines remains limited to pedestrian traffic.

As the ravine system has a small number of formal entry points, it remains an area that few can engage with regularly and remains an "unknown, and inaccessible place" for many in the city. Access to some ravine parks remains limited to pedestrian traffic, most notably ravine parks where its boundary with the sidewalk and roadways has a slope greater than 45 per cent.

During the 1950s and 1960s, several high-rise communities were built at the periphery of the ravine system. However, these communities were not designed with direct access to the ravine system and were effectively cut off from them by multi-story parking at the base of the towers. As a result, these communities have largely failed to adopt the ravines as an amenity, despite their prominent visibility from homes.

== In culture ==
Toronto's ravines have been presented as central to Toronto's "city within a park" character. Architect Larry Richards describes Toronto as topographically being "San Francisco turned upside down" in reference to San Francisco's hilly terrain. Sandy M. Smith, a professor of urban forestry at the University of Toronto, has also remarked how the ravine system acts as the "green veins of the city," defining the city landscape and shaping Toronto's road network, with roadways having to conform to the ravine's boundaries.

=== Portrayal in the arts ===
The ravine system has helped to form a cultural identity for its constituents, as the ravines occupy the "cultural and poetic imagination" of Toronto-based artists and authors as a "para-natural form of infrastructure" beyond the city. It has been suggested that ravines are featured in several works set in Toronto because they are "the chief characteristic of the local terrain" and a "topographical signature" of the city. This includes literary works like Margaret Atwood's Lady Oracle, which depicts the ravines as a meeting place where the unruly dense wilderness collided with the tidy streets of suburban Toronto. Anne Michaels' also describes Toronto as a "city of ravines," in her novel Fugitive Pieces, describing the ravine system as a place where one could "traverse the city beneath the streets, look up to the floating neighbourhoods, houses built in the treetops". The unique topography of Toronto was one of the primary reasons Atom Egoyan chose to set his film Chloe in the city.

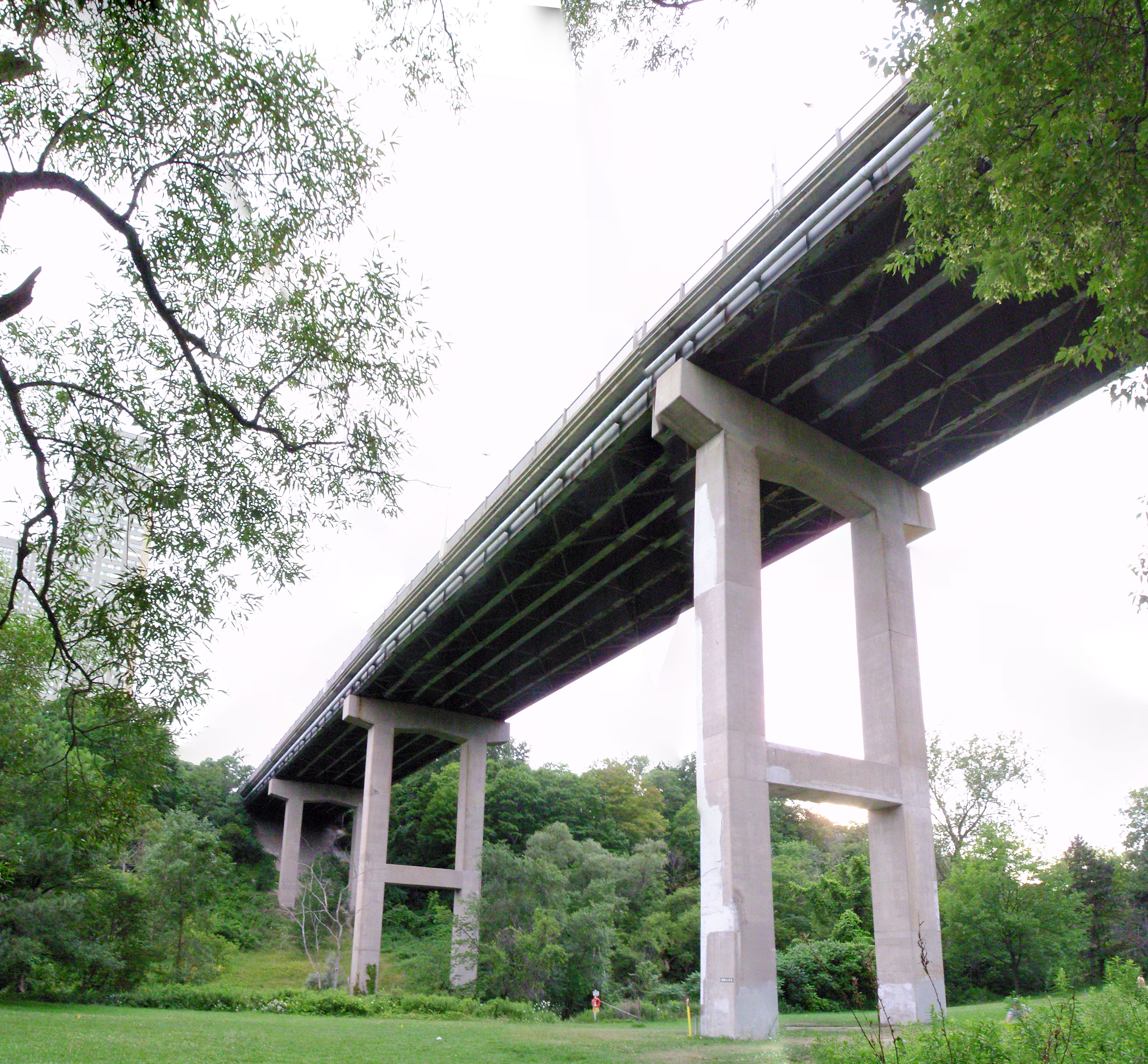
Overlea Boulevard bridge overhead E.T. Seton Park in the Don West River ravine. The ravine system has been described as a place where one could "traverse the city beneath the streets".

According to Robert Fulford, because the ravines are a "tangible (though often hidden) part of [Toronto's] surroundings and a persistent force in [its] civic imagination", they form a "shared subconscious of the municipality," and is therefore where most of the local literature is born from. Fulford also suggests the childhood experiences Toronto-based authors had with ravines resulted in their use as "receptacles of the childhood experiences that they have repressed," and as a "creative, liminal space in which the ambiguities of life can play out". Fulford notes that for many Torontonians, the ravine system was typically their first glimpse of wilderness, representing for many residents a "savage foreign place," and a "republic of childhood," as parents would warn younger children of the "evils" that lurk within, while adolescents viewed the ravines as the only place where they can "find freedom from the vigilant gaze of adults".

However, the way local authors have portrayed the ravine system has changed over time. Several mid-20th century authors, including Atwood and Michael Ondaatje, have portrayed the ravines as a place to be feared, and as a wild place beyond the ecumene. However, authors in the late-20th century, including Anne Michaels and Catherine Bush, have portrayed the ravine system in a positive light, as a place of healing and sanctuary from civic life.

Other artists and authors that have highlighted the Toronto ravine system in their works include Morley Callaghan, Douglas Anthony Cooper, Ernest Hemingway, and Doris McCarthy.

== See also ==
- List of Toronto parks
- Urban parks in Canada
