= Listed buildings in Tittesworth =

Tittesworth is a civil parish in the district of Staffordshire Moorlands, Staffordshire, England. It contains six listed buildings that are recorded in the National Heritage List for England. All the listed buildings are designated at Grade II, the lowest of the three grades, which is applied to "buildings of national importance and special interest". The parish contains the village of Thorncliffe and is otherwise rural. The listed buildings consist of farmhouses and farm buildings, a spring head cover, and a milepost.

== Buildings ==
Name and location	Photograph	Date	Notes
Leek Moorside Farmhouse; 53.11804°N 1.99175°W	—	17th century	The farmhouse was altered and extended in the 19th century. The original part is in stone, the extension is in red brick, the roof is tiled, and there are two storeys. The older part to the right has two parallel ranges and one bay. To the left is a three-bay range with dentilled eaves, containing a doorway with a quoined surround and a Tudor arched head. Some of the windows have chamfered mullions, one has a king mullion carved with urns in low-relief, and the other windows are latticed casements.
Upper Tittesworth Farmhouse; 53.12359°N 1.99603°W	—	17th century	The farmhouse is in sandstone, and has a blue tile roof with coped verges. There is a single storey and an attic, and five bays. The doorway is in the right bay, the windows are casements with three-lights and chamfered mullions, and in the attic are three three-light dormers with timber framed gables.
Ley Fields Farmhouse; 53.12574°N 1.97443°W	—	Late 17th century	The farmhouse, which was altered and extended in the 19th and 20th centuries, is in stone and has a blue tile roof. There are two storeys and four bays. On the front are two doorways, and the windows are mullioned.
Spring head cover and basin 53.12438°N 1.97666°W	—	Late 18th century	The basin is approached by stone slabs, and it has an arched head.
Thorncliffe Grange and farm buildings 53.12301°N 1.98056°W		Late 18th century	The buildings are in stone with tile roofs. The farmhouse is the older part and has two storeys and three bays. In the left bay, which is wider, are paired doorways, and the windows are casements with mullions. A single-bay extension connects the house to the farm buildings, which date from the 19th century and are at right angles. These have modillioned eaves, two storeys and three bays, and contain two stables, an elliptically headed cart entrance, three hay loft doors, and dovecote ledges and openings.
Milepost Leek 2 miles 53.12985°N 1.99217°W		Late 19th century	The milepost is on the east side of the A53 road. It is in cast iron, it is about 700 millimetres (28 in) high, and consists of a circular shaft with an enlarged head. On the head are the distances to Leek and Buxton.
