= Leaside Towers =

The Leaside Towers
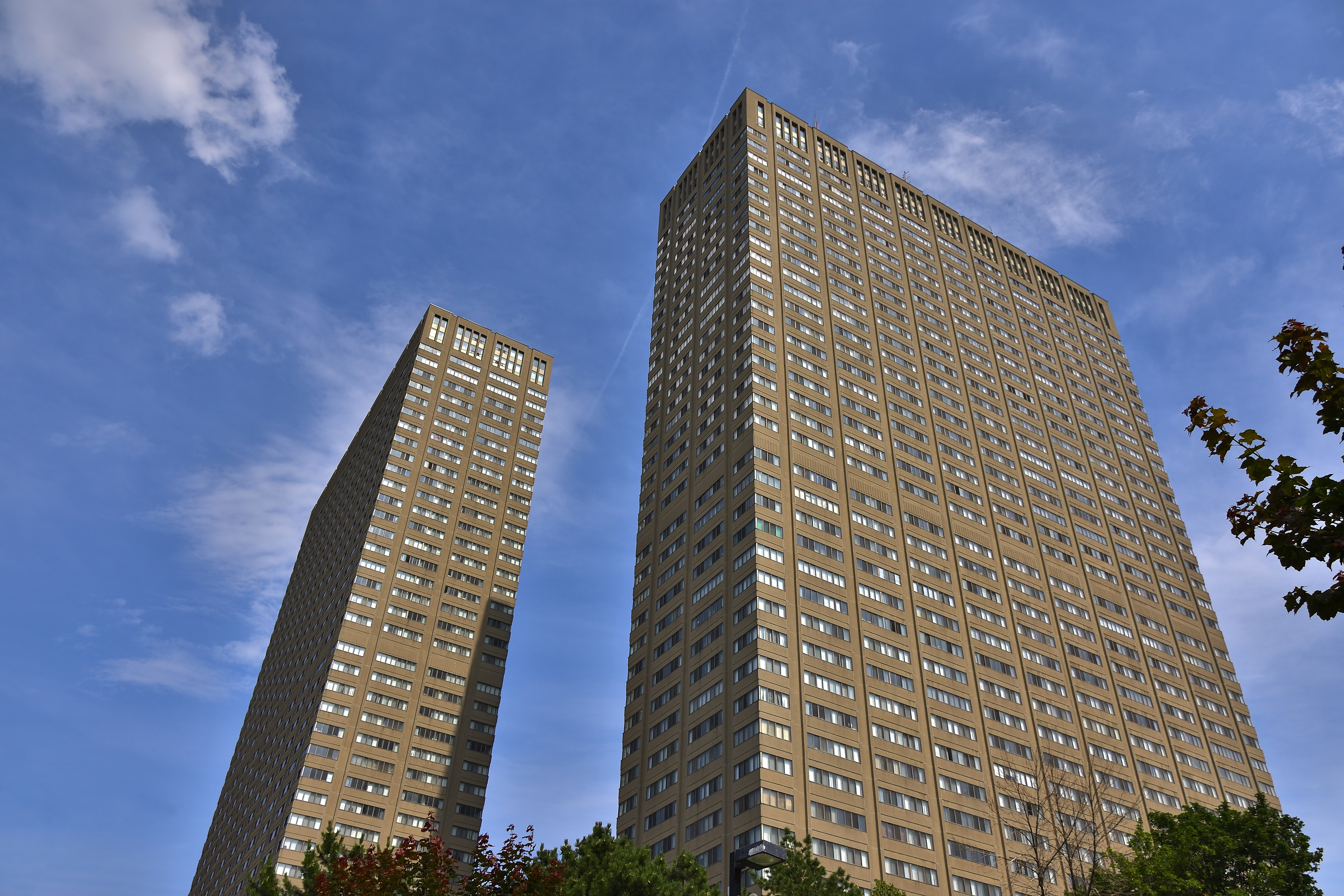
- The Leaside Towers viewed from Overlea Blvd. and Thorncliffe Park East Intersection

General information
- Type: Upscale Residential Apartment
- Location: 85 Thorncliffe Park Drive; Toronto, Ontario; M4H 1L5
- Coordinates: 43.707454°N 79.340665°W
- Completed: 1970
- Cost: CA$20,000,000 (equivalent to $161,773,399 in 2025)

Height
- Roof: 129 m (423 ft)

Technical details
- Floor count: 44

Design and construction
- Architect: Alexander Benedek

Other information
- Number of rooms: 494 (per tower)

The Leaside Towers are the tallest buildings in the East York district of Toronto, Ontario, Canada. They are a twin set of Brutalist-style apartment towers, with one facing north-south, and another facing east-west. Located at 85 and 95 Thorncliffe Park Drive near Overlea, it is the tallest building in East York prior to amalgamation.

With a structural height of 129 m (423 ft) and both towers having 43 floors, it was once the tallest apartment towers in the Commonwealth and in Canada. Construction concluded in 1970. Located along the perimeter of E.T. Seton Park, they provide panoramic views of Toronto's skyline, Don Valley and Don River.

== Mechanical ==
All suites within the two towers include seasonal central air-conditioning, and heating provided through a 4-pipe fan coil unit.

A mixture of water and glycol is chilled to approximately 4 Celsius through water cooled centrifugal chillers located in the basement's utility room of both towers. A mechanical pump circulates the liquid through chilled water risers extending the length of the building before branching out into separate cooling circuits for the individual fan coil units located in every unit.

The chillers use municipal water to cool their condensers. Cooling water exchanges its heat from atmospheric air using three evaporative cooling towers fitted on ground level, south of 95 Thorncliffe Park Drive.

In colder months, a natural gas fired boiler located in the mechanical penthouse of 95 Thorncliffe Park Drive heats the water-glycol mixture before it is circulated through the risers, and subsequently, fan coil units in every suite.

The hot and chilled liquid risers, along with the rest of the building are insulated with polyurethane foam insulation as part of a case study completed by the architect.

In order to minimize the unwanted consequences of the stack effect during winter and summer months, the entrance to the towers feature an air-lock created by revolving doors.

== Notable residents ==
- Bruce McArthur, serial killer who murdered eight men from 2010 to 2017. Arrested by police on January 18, 2018 after a raid on his unit on the 19th floor of 95 Thorncliffe Park Drive.
- William Dennison, Canadian politician and former Mayor of Toronto.
- True Davidson, Canadian politician and former Mayor of East York.
- Michael Prue, Canadian politician and former Mayor of East York.
