= E.T. Seton Park =

Memorial Park in Toronto

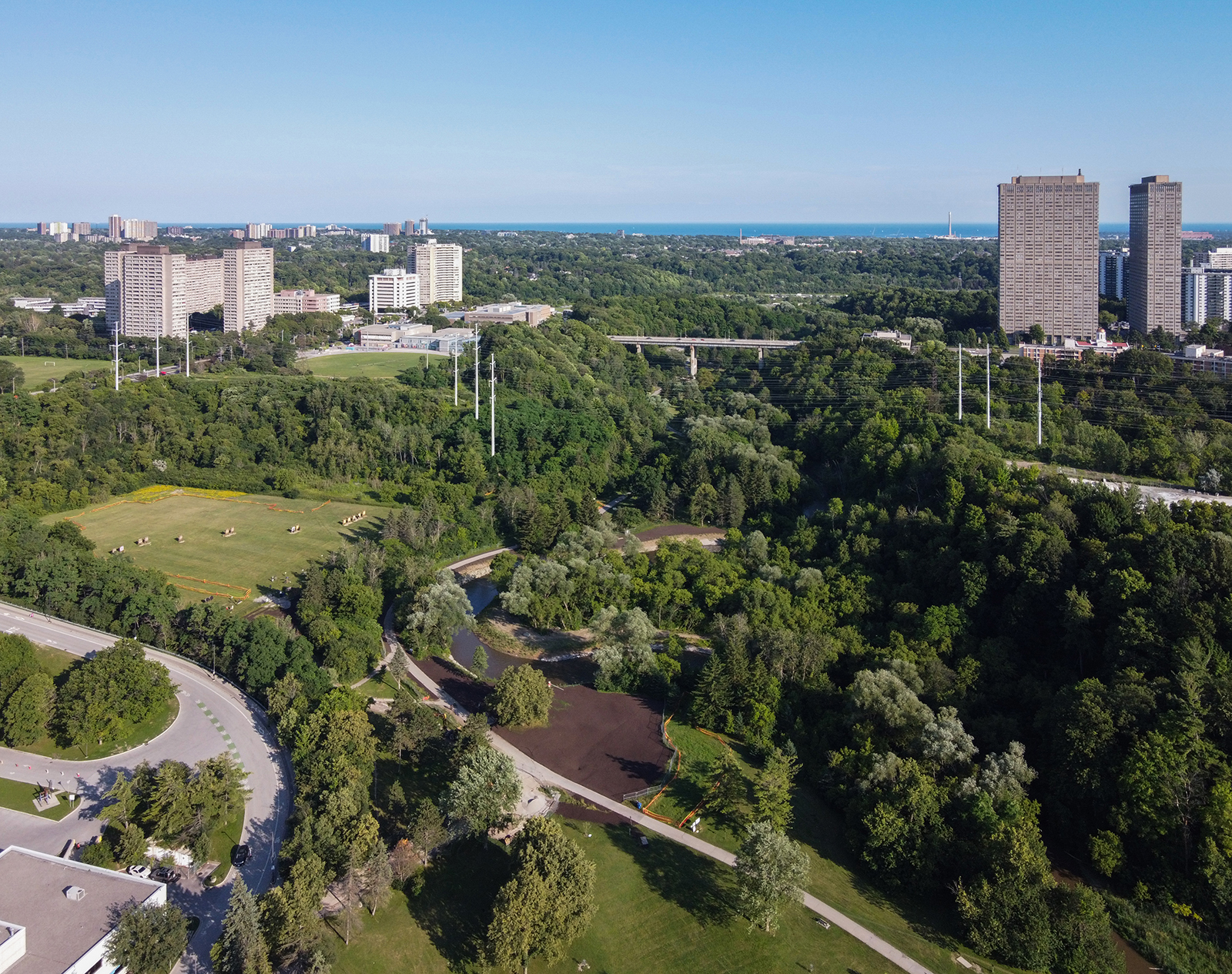
- Aerial view of E.T. Seton Park

- Location within Toronto
- Type: Public Park
- Location: Toronto, Ontario
- Coordinates: 43°42′54″N 79°20′43″W
- Operator: Toronto Parks
- Website: ET Seton Park

E.T. Seton Park is a public park located in Toronto, Ontario, Canada. The main entrance is located at 73 Thorncliffe Park Drive, with an additional entrance via the entrance to Sunnybrook Park and Wilket Creek Park near the junction of Leslie Street and Eglinton Avenue.

The park is named after Ernest Thompson Seton, a British-born author and naturalist. Seton spent much of his childhood (1860 to 1870s) in the Don Valley near the park that bears his name. The Don River runs through the park, which makes it a popular spot for many activities.

E.T. Seton Park adjoins Thorncliffe Park, Flemingdon Park, and the former Ontario Science Centre. It contains an 18 hole disc golf course, jogging and cycling paths, an archery range, Nordic skiing and equestrian trails, as well as three fire pits.

The park's archery range is one of only two public ranges in Canada. It was listed as the archery location in Toronto's bid book for the 2015 Pan American Games, but was not used for that competition because vehicular access to the range was not possible. The archery event for the Pan American Games was held at Varsity Stadium on Bloor Street in downtown Toronto instead.

The disc golf course was installed in 2011. The ET Seton disc golf league runs all summer and meets on Tuesdays at 6:00 p.m. at the tee pad for the 14th hole.
