= Thorncliffe Park Raceway =

Racetrack in Toronto, Ontario

Coordinates: 43.703°N 79.347°W

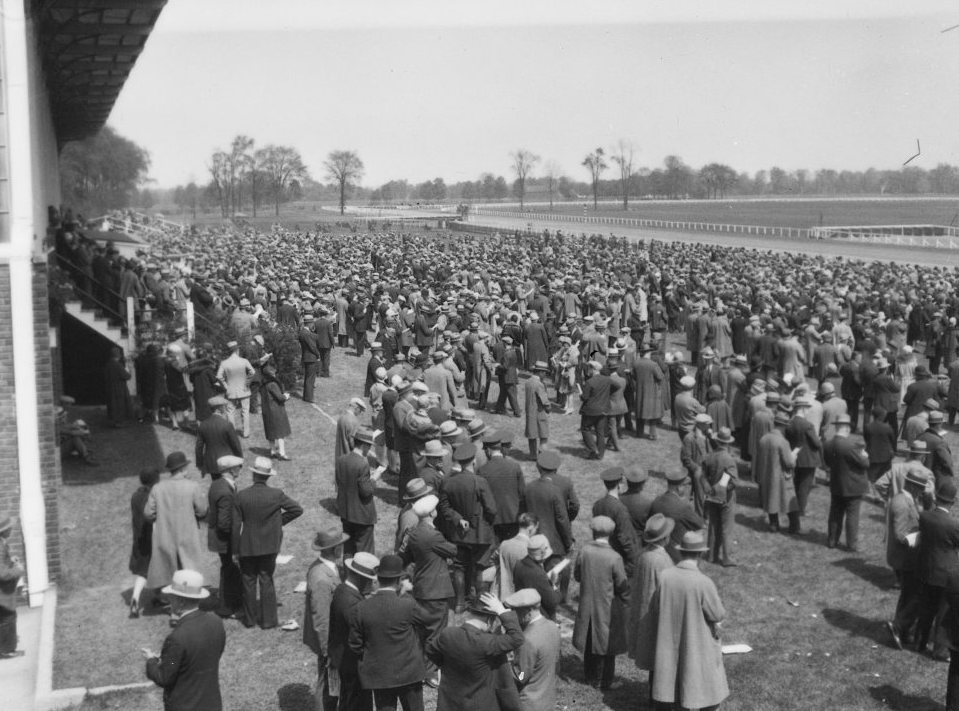
- Interactive map of Thorncliffe Park Raceway
- Location: Toronto, Ontario; Canada
- Date opened: July 21, 1917
- Date closed: August 12, 1953
- Course type: Flat Thoroughbred/Harness
- Notable races: Prince of Wales Stakes (1929–1952), My Dear Stakes (1941–1952), Clarendon Stakes (1926–1952)

Thorncliffe Park Raceway was a Toronto-area racetrack that operated from 1917 until 1952. It was located east of Millwood Road, south of Eglinton Avenue East and the CPR's railroad tracks. It was the first home of the Prince of Wales Stakes. The name is retained today by the Thorncliffe Park neighbourhood.

== History ==
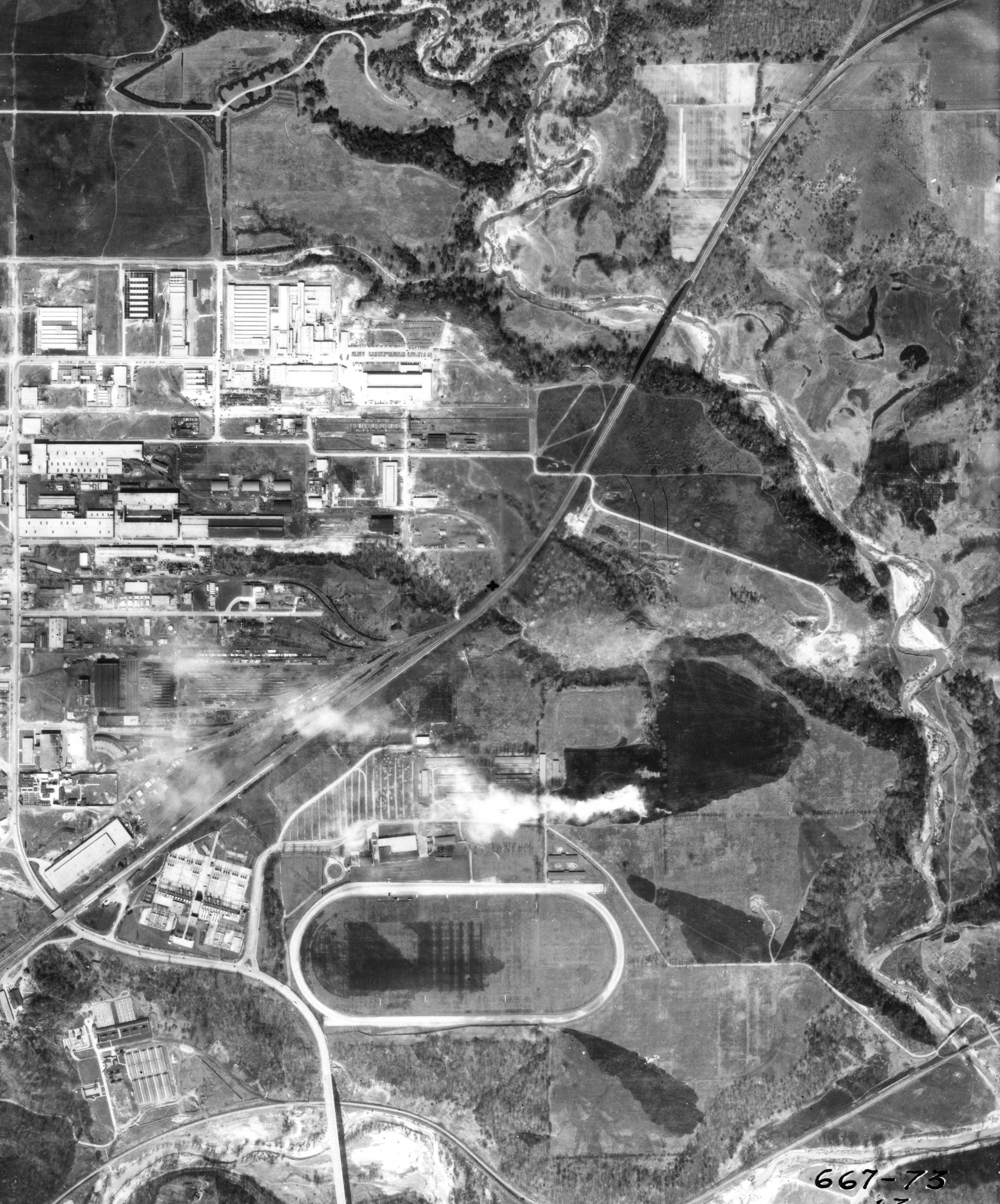
aerial view in 1942

The site of Thorncliffe Park Raceway was originally owned by John Taylor and members of the Taylor family, who established mills, a brewery and a brickyard along the Don River (Ontario). Robert T. Davies, the wealthy founder of the Dominion Brewing Company and related to the Taylor family by marriage, acquired the property in the late 19th century and renamed it Thorncliffe Farm. The name of the farm, and later the racetrack, was inspired by Thorn Cliff, a house built on the west side of the Don River by a member of the third generation of the Taylor family.

An avid participant in horse racing, under the banner of Thorncliffe Stable, Davies raced both thoroughbred and standardbred horses. After his death in 1916, Davies' estate sold the property to a group of investors from Baltimore, Maryland who built a horse racetrack. The track had a simple but small grandstand structure (and covered area) on the northside of the track, stables to the northeast and more stables and parking at the northwest side. Home to thoroughbred horse racing, the track also revitalized harness racing in Toronto following its opening on July 21, 1917. Among its thoroughbred races, the track notably hosted the Prince of Wales Stakes, the My Dear Stakes, and the Clarendon Cup.

On June 5, 1937, W. A. Hewitt was one of the stewards which ordered a rerun, after the race was declared a false start when one horse was missing from its stall and the flag had not been dropped when other horses jumped the barrier. The decision was protested by spectators who stood to lose bets placed on the race, and an angry mob occupied the track for more than two hours in a near-riotous protest.

The track operated until 1952 when it was sold to the Ontario Jockey Club. Thoroughbred racing ended on June 23, 1952, followed by harness racing on August 12, 1953. The property was immediately transferred to a land development company, called Thorncliffe Park Limited. The neighbouring Town of Leaside annexed the nearly 400-acre former raceway in 1954 and demolished it to make way for the planned community of Thorncliffe Park.

Today, the old racetrack site is commemorated by local streets called Thorncliffe Park Drive, Grandstand Place, and Milepost Place, as well as a number of residential buildings that took on racetrack stable names like Churchill, Maple Glen, and Willow Glen. Thorncliffe's Leaside Park and a wooded area cover the area to the south of the original racetrack.
