= Thorncliffe, Staffordshire =

Coordinates: 53.124°N 1.977°W

Red Lion pub in Thorncliffe

Thorncliffe is a small village in Staffordshire, England, straddling the Staffordshire Moorlands and Peak District National Park. By 1600 the name Thorncliffe had replaced the settlement's earlier name, Thorntileg, meaning "clearing in thorn trees". The nearest towns to the village are Leek (2 miles), Buxton (10 miles) and Macclesfield (14 miles).

The village of Thorncliffe has only one pub, the Red Lion Inn, which dates from 1787, when it was called the Reform Inn. The village also has a small Methodist chapel and is the site of Citizen Weather Observer Program station 03330.

Thorncliffe is close to a number of popular tourist attractions. The Roaches, Tittesworth reservoir, Thor’s Cave and Alton Towers are all within a few miles.

The cities of Manchester, Sheffield, Derby and Nottingham are within an hour's commute of the village.

== See also ==
- Listed buildings in Tittesworth
