= List of reeves and mayors of East York =

The chief executive of East York was the Reeve from 1924 to 1966, and the Mayor from 1967 to 1998.

The Township of East York was formed in 1924 from the former York Township.

Reeves

- 1924-1925 Robert Barker - a market gardener and previously a York Township councillor
- 1926 Robert Henry McGregor - contractor and horticulturalist by profession. While reeve, he was elected in the 1926 federal election as a Conservative MP. Served in parliament from 1926 until 1962.
- 1927-1933 Rupert Marshell Leslie - later chairman of the town's first planning board from 1949 to 1959. Owned R.M. Leslie Heating Contractors. President of the East York Conservative Association.
- 1934–1935, 1937-1950 John Warren - was "instrumental" in opening up the township's farmland for industrial development. Served as Warden of York County in 1944. Immigrated from England in 1910 and opened a barber shop on Pape Avenue
- 1936 Arthur Henry Williams - trade unionist and president of the East York Workers' Association. Convinced council to issue poor relief in the form of cash instead of vouchers. Helped organize physical blockades of the bailiff from evicting tenants whose rents were in arrears. Later a Co-operative Commonwealth Federation MPP and MP for nearby Ontario riding.
- 1950-1956 Harry G. Simpson - retired bank manager, later served as a hydro commissioner. Lost to incumbent Reeve Warren in 1949 by 54 votes before defeating him in the January 1950 election.
- 1957-1960 Jack Allen - landscaper whose projects included Memorial Gardens and the grounds of Sunnybrook Hospital. Was provincial flyweight boxing champion in 1932. In 1960, suggested a stadium be built on the Railway Lands, where the Rogers Centre is now located. Was blamed for construction of the Bayview Ghost, which contributed to his defeat.
- 1961-1966 True Davidson - Journalist and children's book author and was the first female publishing sales representative in Canada before entering politics. Was previously a supporter of the CCF, ran as a Liberal candidate in the 1971 provincial election. Led the effort to restore Todmorden Mills as a heritage museum and founded East York's July 1 Dominion Day parade.

East York became a borough in 1967 and remained so until 1998.

Mayors

- 1967-1972 True Davidson - With the merger of the towns of East York and Leaside, Davidson defeated Leaside reeve Beth Nealson to become the new borough of East York's first mayor.
- 1973-1976 Willis Blair - resigned in 1976 to accept an appointment to the Ontario Municipal Board. Later chair of the Liquor Licensing Board of Ontario
- 1976 Leslie H. Saunders - former mayor of Toronto, and a staunch Orangeman. Appointed by council following the resignation of Willis Blair.
- 1977-1982 Alan Redway - a lawyer by profession, later served Progressive Conservative MP for York East and Don Valley East and as Minister of State for Housing.
- 1983-1993 David Johnson - resigned upon becoming Progressive Conservative MPP for Don Mills in a by-election. Later served as a cabinet minister. After leaving politics he was appointed chair of the Ontario Municipal Board.
- 1993-1998 Michael Prue - appointed by council April 8, 1993 following Johnson's election to the Ontario legislature. Won election in his own right in the 1994 municipal election. Later a New Democratic MPP for Beaches—East York. During his tenure as mayor, Prue brought in five consecutive budgets without a tax increase, while cutting East York's debt by $7.8 million.
