= Toronto—Scarborough =

Former federal electoral district in Ontario, Canada

Ontario electoral district

Defunct federal electoral district
- Legislature: House of Commons
- District created: 1924
- District abolished: 1933
- First contested: 1925
- Last contested: 1930

Toronto—Scarborough was a federal electoral district represented in the House of Commons of Canada from 1925 to 1935. It was located in the east end of the city of Toronto, in the province of Ontario. This riding was created in 1924 from parts of York East and York South riding and consisted of the portion of the City of Toronto east of a line described as starting at the intersection of Pape Avenue with the northern boundary of the city, and following Pape Avenue, Danforth Avenue, Greenwood Avenue, Queen Street East, and then following the alignment of Knox Street south to Lake Ontario. The district's eastern boundary Victoria Park Ave, thus it did not actually contain any part of modern day Scarborough.

The electoral district was abolished in 1933 when it was redistributed between Broadview, Danforth, and Greenwood electoral districts.

== Members of Parliament ==
This riding has elected the following members of Parliament:

Parliament	Years	Member	Party
Riding created from York East and York South
15th	1925–1926	Joseph Henry Harris	Conservative
16th	1926–1930	Joseph Henry Harris	Conservative
17th	1930–1935	Joseph Henry Harris	Conservative
Riding dissolved into Broadview, Danforth and Greenwood

== Election history ==
1925 Canadian federal election: Toronto—Scarborough
Party	Candidate	Votes	%	±%
Conservative	Joseph Henry Harris	18,481		
Liberal	Edwin Charles Beer	4,281		

1926 Canadian federal election: Toronto—Scarborough
Party	Candidate	Votes	%	±%
Conservative	Joseph Henry Harris	14,938		
Liberal	Frank Norman Walker	3,556		

1930 Canadian federal election: Toronto—Scarborough
Party	Candidate	Votes	%	±%
Conservative	Joseph Henry Harris	17,122		
Liberal	William Henry Ford	6,156		

== See also ==
- List of Canadian electoral districts
- Historical federal electoral districts of Canada
