= David Collenette =

Canadian politician (born 1946)

The Honourable David Michael Collenette PC OOnt

Minister of Transport
- In office 11 June 1997 – 11 December 2003
- Prime Minister: Jean Chrétien
- Preceded by: David Anderson
- Succeeded by: Tony Valeri

Minister of National Defence
- In office 4 November 1993 – 4 October 1996
- Prime Minister: Jean Chrétien
- Preceded by: Tom Siddon
- Succeeded by: Doug Young

Minister of Veterans Affairs
- In office 4 November 1993 – 4 October 1996
- Prime Minister: Jean Chrétien
- Preceded by: Peter McCreath
- Succeeded by: Doug Young

Member of Parliament for Don Valley East
- In office 25 October 1993 – 28 June 2004
- Preceded by: Alan Redway
- Succeeded by: Yasmin Ratansi

Member of Parliament for York East
- In office 18 February 1980 – 4 September 1984
- Preceded by: Ron Ritchie
- Succeeded by: Alan Redway
- In office 8 July 1974 – 22 May 1979
- Preceded by: Ian MacLachlan Arrol
- Succeeded by: Ron Ritchie

Personal details
- Born: 24 June 1946 (age 80) London, England, UK
- Party: Liberal
- Spouse: Penny Collenette
- Education: Glendon College, York (BA, MA)
- Profession: Business Advisor

David Michael Collenette, PC OOnt (born 24 June 1946) is a former Canadian politician. From 1974, until his retirement from politics in 2004, he was a member of the Liberal Party of Canada. A graduate from York University's Glendon College in 1969, he subsequently received his MA, in 2004 and LL.D for education in 2015 from the same university. He was first elected in the York East riding of Toronto to the House of Commons on 8 July 1974, in the Pierre Trudeau government and returned to Parliament in 1993 representing Don Valley East.

Collenette served as a Member of the Canadian House of Commons for more than 20 years. He was elected five times and defeated twice. He served in the Cabinet under three prime ministers - Pierre Trudeau, John Turner, and Jean Chrétien. He held several portfolios:

- Minister of State-Multiculturalism (1983–1984);
- Minister of National Defence (1993–1996);
- Minister of Veterans Affairs (1993–1996);
- Minister of Transport (1997–2003) and
- Minister of Crown Corporations (2002–2003).

During the constitutional debates of the early 1980s, he served as Parliamentary Secretary to the Government House leader and was assigned by the government to Westminster to represent Canada's interests.

He served as Chair of the House of Commons Special Energy Committee in 1982–83 dealing with legislation for the national energy program (NEP).

== Politics ==
Collenette was one of only three cabinet members to endorse Jean Chrétien in the 1984 Liberal Party of Canada leadership election, along with Charles Caccia and Roméo LeBlanc.

He also supported Chrétien in the 1990 leadership campaign.

=== Minister of National Defence ===
As Minister of Defence, Collenette oversaw the reorganization, restructuring and re-engineering of the department as part of the federal government's deficit cutting. During this time the Canadian Forces were involved in challenging assignments in the Balkans, Haiti and Somalia.

During his tenure, Collenette was at the centre of the controversy over the establishment of a public inquiry into the Somalia Affair investigating war crimes committed by Canadian Soldiers during deployment in 1992 by the Mulroney Progressive Conservatives. The Chrétien government later decided to curtail the inquiry.

In October 1996, Collenette resigned from cabinet citing a letter that he had written on behalf of a constituent. An access to information request revealed Collenette broke ethical guidelines by writing the letter to the Immigration and Refugee Board. Collenette cited this violation as his official reason for resigning from cabinet but his resignation also served to remove him from the ongoing Somalia Affair controversy.

=== Minister of Transport ===
Collenette was re-admitted to Cabinet in July 1997 as Minister of Transport. In this portfolio his most important decisions were those that led to the merging of Canadian Airlines and Air Canada, the divestment of CN Rail operations in Northern Manitoba to the favour of Omnitrax, and the pseudo-commercialisation of Port Authorities under the Canada Marine Act. He also successfully argued in the late 1990s for the first substantial increase in funding for Via Rail since cuts in 1981, 1990 and 1994.

On 11 September 2001, the Federal Aviation Administration (FAA) closed down U.S. airspace after a series of terrorist attacks on the World Trade Center and the Pentagon. Collenette acted swiftly and shut down Canadian airspace in order to take in diverted U.S.-bound international flights, launching Transport Canada's Operation Yellow Ribbon. Ultimately, 255 flights carrying 44,519 passengers were diverted to 15 Canadian airports. In the time that has followed, Collenette has applauded the way Canadians responded to the crisis. He, Chrétien, U.S. Ambassador to Canada Paul Cellucci, and other provincial and local officials presided over Canada's memorial service to mark the first anniversary of 9/11 at Gander International Airport in Newfoundland and Labrador. There, he helped Chrétien unveil a plaque, commemorating the acts of kindness seen for the diverted passengers not just in Gander, but across the country.

=== Regional Minister Responsible for the Greater Toronto Area ===
As regional Minister for the Greater Toronto Area 1997–2003, Mr. Collenette oversaw federal infrastructure funding that resulted in the largest single expansion of cultural institutions in Canadian history at the Royal Ontario Museum, the Art Gallery of Ontario, the Four Seasons Centre for the Performing Arts, the National Ballet School, the Royal Conservatory of Music, the Roy Thompson Hall and the Gardiner Museum of Ceramic Art. He also initiated the second tranche of GTA infrastructure funding for $1 billion towards major GO Transit improvements, including the reopening of CN Bradford to Barrie line. Mr. Collenette promoted the concept of a rail link between Pearson Airport and downtown Toronto and under his leadership, planning, acquisition of property and a Solicitation of Interest the project was implemented. The highly successful link was subsequently built by Metrolinx and opened in 2016.

Collenette also designated the Oak Ridges Moraine portion of the Pickering Airport lands administered by Transport Canada, as open greenspace in perpetuity. These lands eventually became part of the Rouge National Urban Park, opened in 2015.

=== Retirement ===
Chrétien was pressured into resigning as prime minister and party leader by supporters of former finance minister Paul Martin. As Collenette was considered a staunch Chrétien loyalist it was not surprising that he was dropped from cabinet when Martin became prime minister in December, 2003. Collenette initially planned to stay on as an MP. However, he was informed that his riding nomination would not be guaranteed. On 29 January 2004, Collenette announced his retirement from politics and went on to work in academia and as a consultant in the private sector.

== Post-political career ==
He is a member of the board of directors of the Chartered Institute of Logistics and Transport (North America) and of Harbourfront Corporation in Toronto. He also is a past member of the board at Toronto East General Hospital Foundation Campaign Executive Team and of the Glendon School of Public and International Affairs. Collenette was a Senior Counsel with Hill & Knowlton Canada, a public relations and communications firm until recently. He currently serves as Chair of the NATO Association of Canada.

David Collenette served as the Government of Ontario Special Advisor for High-Speed Rail in the Windsor - Toronto corridor, from 2015 to 2018.

=== City of Ottawa Transportation Task Force Committee ===
On 19 January 2007, Ottawa Mayor Larry O'Brien named Collenette as the head of a volunteer Transportation Task Force Committee in which in a six-month period it reviewed the transportation issues across the city. It produced a report which suggested light-rail service expansion throughout the city of Ottawa, including an east–west route in a downtown tunnel, and several communities in Eastern Ontario as well as portions of the Outaouais region in Western Quebec. The Ottawa LRT opened in 2019. His report also suggested one to two new interprovincial bridge crossings between Gatineau and Ottawa over the next 30 years.

== Personal life ==
He is married to Penny Collenette. She was selected to be the Liberal candidate in the riding of Ottawa Centre for the 40th Canadian federal election but lost to incumbent NDP MP Paul Dewar. David has one son Christopher Collenette a Dublin-based company executive and corporate director.

In January 2024, he was appointed to the Order of Ontario.

== Electoral record ==
2000 Canadian federal election: Don Valley East
Party	Candidate	Votes	%	±%
Liberal	David Collenette	25,915	66.6	+11.5
Progressive Conservative	Cecila Fusco	5,645	14.5	-7.6
Alliance	Kasra Nejatian	4,736	12.2	-1.1
New Democratic	Ron Casey Nestor	2,249	5.8	-1.9
Independent	Ryan Kidd	212	0.5	
Marxist–Leninist	Judith Snow	153	0.4	
Total valid votes		38,910	100.0	

Note: Canadian Alliance vote is compared to the Reform vote in 1997 election.

1997 Canadian federal election: Don Valley East
Party	Candidate	Votes	%	±%
Liberal	David Collenette	21,511	55.1	+1.0
Progressive Conservative	Denzil Minnan-Wong	8,610	22.1	-1.3
Reform	John Pope	5,167	13.2	-4.1
New Democratic	Shodja Ziaian	2,981	7.6	+3.8
Canadian Action	Joe Braini	384	1.0	
Natural Law	Mark Roy	192	0.5	0.0
Independent	Mariam Abou-Dib	170	0.4	
Total valid votes		39,015	100.0	

1993 Canadian federal election: Don Valley East
Party	Candidate	Votes	%	±%
Liberal	David Collenette	21,511	54.1	+16.2
Progressive Conservative	Alan Redway	9,279	23.3	-21.4
Reform	Gordon E. Honsey	6,877	17.3	
New Democratic	Janice Waud Loper	1,538	3.9	-11.2
Libertarian	Mark Meschino	238	0.6	-0.7
Natural Law	Fred Fredeen	205	0.5	
Marxist–Leninist	Roger Carter	90	0.2	
Abolitionist	Michael Mazerolle	22	0.1	
Total valid votes		39,760	100.0	

1974 Canadian federal election: York East
Party	Candidate	Votes
Liberal	David Collenette	20,682
Progressive Conservative	Ian MacLachlan Arrol	17,593
New Democratic Party	Kay MacPherson	9,818
Marxist–Leninist	John Dennis	150
Communist	Dan Hammond	128
Independent	Paul M. Miniato	121
