= Ontario Liberal Party candidates in the 1990 Ontario provincial election =

The governing Ontario Liberal Party fielded a full slate of candidates in the 1990 provincial election, and won 36 of 130 seats, falling to Official Opposition status in the Ontario legislature.

Many of the party's candidates have their own biography pages. Information about others may be found here.

== Ozzie Grant (York South) ==
Grant was 43 years old. He joined the Liberal Party in 1974, and had worked in housing management for over fifteen years by the time of the 1990 election. His primary campaign issues were day care, housing and the environment. He received 4,534 votes (18.17%), finishing second against New Democratic Party leader Bob Rae.
