= Danforth (electoral district) =

Former federal electoral district in Ontario, Canada

Ontario electoral district
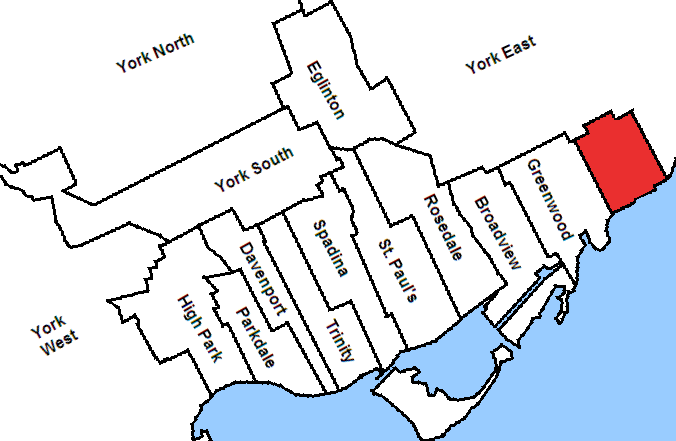
- Danforth as it was from 1933 to 1947 among the other Toronto ridings

Defunct federal electoral district
- Legislature: House of Commons
- District created: 1933
- District abolished: 1966
- First contested: 1935
- Last contested: 1965

Danforth was a federal electoral district represented in the House of Commons of Canada from 1935 to 1968. It was located in the province of Ontario.

This riding was created in 1933 from parts of Toronto—Scarborough riding. It initially consisted of the eastern part of the city of Toronto, bounded on the south by Lake Ontario, on the north and east by the Toronto city limits, on the west by Woodbine Avenue.

In 1952, it was redefined to include the part of Scarborough township south of St. Clair Avenue between the western limit of Scarborough and Midland Avenue. Danforth represented what is now the Greektown area of Toronto.

The electoral district was abolished in 1966 when it was redistributed between Greenwood, Scarborough West and York East ridings.

== Members of Parliament ==
This riding elected the following members of the House of Commons of Canada:

Parliament	Years	Member	Party
Riding created from Toronto—Scarborough
18th	1935–1940	Joseph Henry Harris	Conservative
19th	1940–1945	Joseph Henry Harris	Conservative
20th	1945–1949	Joseph Henry Harris	Progressive Conservative
21st	1949–1953	Joseph Henry Harris	Progressive Conservative
22nd	1953–1957	Robert Hardy Small	Progressive Conservative
23rd	1957–1958	Robert Hardy Small	Progressive Conservative
24th	1958–1962	Robert Hardy Small	Progressive Conservative
25th	1962–1963	Reid Scott	New Democratic
26th	1963–1965	Reid Scott	New Democratic
27th	1965–1968	Reid Scott	New Democratic
Riding dissolved into Greenwood, Scarborough West and York East

== Election results ==
1935 Canadian federal election
Party	Candidate	Votes
Conservative	Joseph Henry Harris	9,231
Liberal	Norman Wilks	4,521
Co-operative Commonwealth	M. Stanley Elliott	3,855
Reconstruction	Thomas W. Learie	3,416

1940 Canadian federal election
Party	Candidate	Votes
Conservative	Joseph Henry Harris	11,847
Liberal	Lewis Duncan	8,946

1945 Canadian federal election
Party	Candidate	Votes
Progressive Conservative	Joseph Henry Harris	11,401
Liberal	Norman Caldwell	6,415
Co-operative Commonwealth	William Jarvis McCurdy	4,467

1949 Canadian federal election
Party	Candidate	Votes
Progressive Conservative	Joseph Henry Harris	9,960
Liberal	Norman Caldwell	8,013
Co-operative Commonwealth	Avis M. McCurdy	5,601

1953 Canadian federal election
Party	Candidate	Votes
Progressive Conservative	Robert Hardy Small	12,595
Liberal	Unsworth N. Jones	11,834
Co-operative Commonwealth	Avis McCurdy	5,905
Labor–Progressive	Annie Louise Wilson	374

1957 Canadian federal election
Party	Candidate	Votes
Progressive Conservative	Robert Hardy Small	18,604
Co-operative Commonwealth	Robert Alfred Best	9,720
Liberal	Ernest A. Bruce	8,443

1958 Canadian federal election
Party	Candidate	Votes
Progressive Conservative	Robert Hardy Small	24,139
Co-operative Commonwealth	R. Alfred Best	9,352
Liberal	Ernest A. Bruce	7,529

1962 Canadian federal election
Party	Candidate	Votes
New Democratic	Reid Scott	14,029
Progressive Conservative	Robert Hardy Small	13,144
Liberal	John Whitehead	12,498
Social Credit	Ernest T. Watts	364

1963 Canadian federal election
Party	Candidate	Votes
New Democratic	Reid Scott	14,903
Liberal	John Whitehead	14,701
Progressive Conservative	Robert Hardy Small	10,835
Social Credit	Ernest T. Watts	212

1965 Canadian federal election
Party	Candidate	Votes
New Democratic	Reid Scott	19,320
Liberal	Tim Reid	10,906
Progressive Conservative	Tom Wardle	9,242

== See also ==
- List of Canadian electoral districts
- Historical federal electoral districts of Canada
