= Arrol =

Arrol may refer to:

== People ==
- Arrol Corelli (born 1985), Indian composer
- Ian MacLachlan Arrol (1924–2000), English politician
- William Arrol (1839–1913), Scottish civil engineer

== Places ==
- Arrol Gantry, Northern Ireland
- Arrol Icefall, Antarctica

== Companies ==
- Arrol-Aster, Scottish manufacturer of automobiles
- Arrol-Johnston, Scottish manufacturer of automobiles
- Sir William Arrol & Co., Scottish civil engineering and construction business
