= Willis Blair =

Canadian politician

Willis L. Blair

2nd Mayor of East York
- In office 1973–1976
- Preceded by: True Davidson
- Succeeded by: Leslie H. Saunders

Personal details
- Born: May 14, 1923 West Zorra, Ontario
- Died: April 5, 2014 (aged 90) Toronto, Ontario
- Party: Progressive Conservative
- Education: University of Toronto
- Profession: Insurance broker

Willis Lincoln Blair (May 14, 1923 – April 5, 2014) was a Canadian politician and public servant who was mayor of the Metropolitan Toronto municipality of East York, Ontario, from 1973 to 1976 and chairman of the Liquor Licensing Board of Ontario from 1981 to 1986.

Blair was born to the descendants of Scottish immigrants to Canada in the town of West Zorra and grew up on his parents' dairy farm, the eldest of eight children.

During World War II he enlisted in the Royal Canadian Air Force serving on home soil as a mechanic and test pilot. After the war he attended the University of Toronto where he became president of the campus Progressive Conservative club. After graduating he worked for Canada Life as an insurance broker.

Blair became involved in municipal politics and was elected an alderman on East York's town council in 1958 and would serve on council for 18 years. He was elected mayor of what was by then the borough of East York in the 1972 municipal election, succeeding True Davidson, and took office on January 1, 1973. Blair was re-elected to a second two-year term in 1974 but resigned in 1976 to accept an appointment to the Ontario Municipal Board. During his term as mayor, he was instrumental in East York becoming host city for the first World Junior Curling Championships in 1975 (Willis was an avid curling enthusiast). He also initiated the first ever "East York New Years Day Levee" which offers East York residents the ability to meet and greet with elected staff typically on New Years Day, which has been held annually ever since.

While mayor, East York council acquired a puppy bulldog, a dog which was a mascot of the Town, to mark the Borough's 50th anniversary. The dog lived at Blair's house for less than a year before becoming too large and being rehoused with a town employee.

Blair also served on Metropolitan Toronto Council from 1967 to 1976. He worked closely with Metro Toronto Chairman Paul Godfrey and others in the successful bid to convince Major League Baseball to award Toronto what became the Toronto Blue Jays franchise, and helped ensure that Exhibition Stadium was renovated to accommodate major league baseball.

In the late 1970s, Blair was appointed by the provincial government of Bill Davis to head a commission examining how property tax rates should be set. He was then appointed to serve as the chair of the Liquor Licensing Board of Ontario from 1981 to 1986.

He died in Toronto on April 5, 2014, at the age of 90 and was survived by his wife Elsie, their children, grandchildren and great-grandchildren.

1963 Canadian federal election: York East
Party	Candidate	Votes
Liberal	Steve Otto	21,038
Progressive Conservative	Willis Blair	14,777
New Democratic Party	Sid Dunkley	11,234
Social Credit	James Mackie	349

== See also ==
- List of mayors of East York
