= James Metcalfe (York East MP) =

Canadian politician

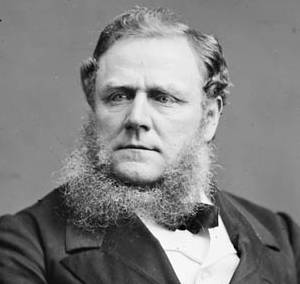

Member of Parliament for York East
- In office 1867–1878
- Preceded by: Riding established
- Succeeded by: Alfred Boultbee

Personal details
- Born: 1822 Cumberland, England
- Died: September 13, 1886 Toronto, Ontario, Canada
- Party: Liberal
- Spouse: Ellen Howson
- Profession: Building contractor
- Picture source: Library and Archives Canada

James Metcalfe (1822 – September 13, 1886) was an Ontario businessman and political figure. He represented York East in the House of Commons of Canada as a Liberal member from 1867 to 1878.

He was born in Cumberland, England in 1822, the son of James Metcalfe and Anne Finlinson and was educated in Manchester. He studied architecture with his father there. In 1841, Metcalfe emigrated to Upper Canada and worked as a building contractor in Toronto. In 1843, he married Ellen Howson. In 1851, he went to Australia, again working as a contractor builder in Melbourne, where he built several public buildings. He returned to Toronto in 1858 and later served as vice-president of the Royal Canadian Bank.

1867 Canadian federal election: York East
Party	Candidate	Votes
Liberal	James Metcalfe	1,174
Unknown	T. A. Milne	937
Eligible voters		2,863
Source: Canadian Parliamentary Guide, 1871

1872 Canadian federal election: York East/York-Est
Party	Candidate	Votes
Liberal	James Metcalfe	acc.
Source: Canadian Elections Database

1874 Canadian federal election: York East
Party	Candidate	Votes
Liberal	James Metcalfe	acc.
lop.parl.ca

1878 Canadian federal election: York East
Party	Candidate	Votes
Conservative	Alfred Boultbee	1,526
Liberal	James Metcalfe	1,460
