= True Davidson =

Canadian politician and writer

- Davidson in 1972, after her retirement from politics

1st Mayor of East York
- In office 1966–1972
- Preceded by: Position established
- Succeeded by: Willis Blair

9th Reeve of East York Township
- In office 1961–1966
- Preceded by: Jack R. Allen
- Succeeded by: Position abolished

Personal details
- Born: Jean Gertrude Davidson; 19 April 1901 Hudson, Quebec
- Died: 18 September 1978 (aged 77) East York, Ontario
- Education: Victoria College
- Profession: Writer, editor

Jean Gertrude "True" Davidson, CM (19 April 1901 – 18 September 1978), was a Canadian politician, teacher, and writer. She was the first mayor of the Borough of East York, Ontario, and she was one of Metropolitan Toronto's most colourful politicians in a career spanning nearly 25 years. She spent 10 years on the East York school board and 11 years as alderwoman, reeve and mayor on East York Council. During her time in municipal politics she ran in 11 elections and never lost.

She was born in Hudson, Quebec, the daughter of a Methodist minister. She was educated at the University of Toronto and then worked as a teacher. She worked as a writer, editing a 12-volume compendium of Canadiana by William Perkins Bull. After her parents died, she moved to East York where she quickly became involved in local politics. She became a school trustee in 1947 and later chair of the school board. In 1958, she ran for local council and served one term before being elected as reeve in 1960. In 1966, East York merged with Leaside and Davidson emerged as the winner in a runoff election for mayor against Leaside's mayor, Beth Nealson. Davidson stayed on as mayor for six years until she retired in 1972.

Davidson was inspired to join the Co-operative Commonwealth Federation (CCF) in the 1930s after meeting J.S. Woodsworth. She ran twice as a candidate for the party losing both times. She left the party after the CCF merged with the Canadian Labour Congress to form the New Democratic Party of Canada. In 1971, she ran for the Liberals in the 1971 provincial election but lost to incumbent Arthur Meen. In the last six years of her life she concentrated on writing a twice weekly column for the Toronto Sun and also focused her efforts on environmental conservation. She died in 1978 at the age of 77.

== Early life ==
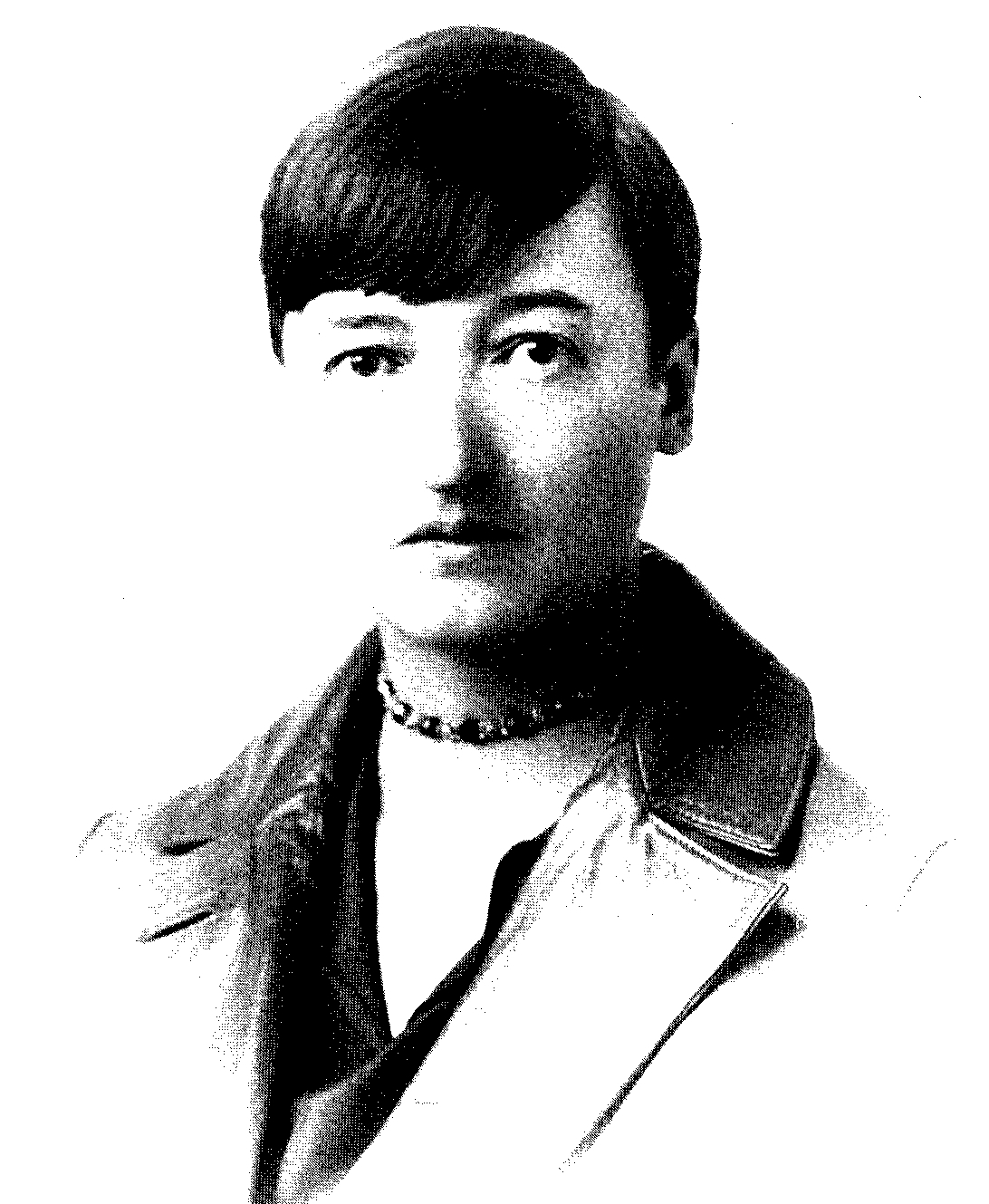
Davidson, about 30 years old

Jean Gertrude "True" Davidson was born in Hudson, Quebec, in 1901. Her father, John Wilson Davidson was a Methodist minister. Her mother, Mary Elfeda Pomeroy, was the daughter of a Methodist minister. She had a younger sister named Marsh. At the time of her death she had two nephews, Michael and David Cobden.

In 1917, she attended Victoria College (now part of the University of Toronto) when it was still in Cobourg, Ontario, starting at the age of 16. She earned her BA there and then went to the Regina Normal School where she obtained a teaching certificate. She taught English and History in Strasbourg, Saskatchewan and Brandon, Manitoba. In 1923, she returned to university and received her M.A. After that she taught history at Havergal College in Toronto.

Davidson wrote children's books and for a time worked for textbook publisher J.M. Dent and Sons as a salesperson, visiting school boards across the country. She was the first female publishing sales representative in Canada. Leaving J.M. Dent in 1930, Davidson spent a year attempting to survive as a writer. During this time she wrote articles for The Globe and Mail and Chatelaine magazine. In 1931, she was hired by William Perkins Bull to coordinate the publication of a 12-volume edition of Canadiana. She worked on the project for seven years. By the time it was completed she was in charge of a staff of 70 researchers.

In 1940, she moved with her parents to Streetsville, Ontario. During the move she was in a motor vehicle accident that left her father seriously injured. He died four days later. Left destitute and caring for her invalid mother, she performed odd writing jobs until in April 1941, she was appointed Clerk and Treasurer of the Village of Streetsville. She was replacing someone who had gone overseas to fight in World War II.

== Political career ==
=== Co-operative Commonwealth Federation ===
Davidson joined the Co-operative Commonwealth Federation (CCF) in 1934 after meeting J.S. Woodsworth. She remarked about him, "He had a burning fire of love for people. You could warm your hands in his personality." She worked for Agnes MacPhail and Arthur Williams on their election campaigns in the 1930s. She ran for the CCF in the 1953 federal election in the riding of York East coming third behind Robert McGregor. (Note: York East results, Federal election, 10 August 1953: R.H. McGregor (PC), 11,126; J.D. Thomas (L), 8,747; True Davidson (CCF), 5855; Margery Robinson (Lab-Prog), 479.) She also ran provincially in the 1955 Ontario election against Hollis Beckett, again with a poor showing. (Note: York East results, Provincial election, 9 June 1955: Hollis Beckett (PC), 19,112; Royce H. Frith (L), 11,321; True Davidson (CCF), 10,990.) In 1971 she recalled this period of involvement with the CCF. She said, "I'm not a partisan politician at all ... I ran for the CCF 15 or 16 years ago when the CCF had fallen on very stony places. I don't know why I ran. I had no thought of winning."

She became concerned with the direction of the party, especially after the disastrous results of the 1951 provincial election. She felt that the party was moving away from grassroots volunteers who discussed social issues with voters and was more concerned with fundraising and member recruitment. In 1952, she helped form a committee with Bill Temple, Mary Ramsay and Avis McCurdy, called the "Ginger Group". The committee met prior to the CCF provincial convention to discuss party issues. They resolved to try and nominate Bill Temple as leader against Ted Jolliffe. At the convention Temple withdrew at the last minute, allowing Jolliffe to be acclaimed. Davidson and Temple were subsequently elected to the executive as vice-presidents.

In 1954, Davidson walked out of a party conference that called for parties in municipal politics. She felt that party politics should stay out of local councils. After that she became more involved in local politics and drifted away from the party. When the CCF merged with the Canadian Labour Congress in 1961 to form the New Democratic Party (NDP), she refused to join due to its partnership with the unions. She said, "I never joined the NDP. I didn't like the NDP from the beginning. I came to believe that socialism wouldn't cure the ills of the world. I couldn't see it."

=== East York ===
Davidson in 1971, wearing one of her trademark hats

Davidson moved to East York in 1947 after the death of her mother. Shortly after moving she was diagnosed with cancer at Princess Margaret Hospital. Feeling that she had not much time left Davidson immersed herself in community issues. It turned out that the cancer diagnosis was incorrect but she continued her involvement. She established a neighbourhood kindergarten which led to her being elected as a school trustee in 1948. In 1952, she became the first woman to chair the East York Board of Education. In 1958, she was elected to East York's town council. In 1960, she ran for the position of Reeve of the Township of East York against incumbent Jack Allen. The main issue at the time was uncontrolled development on land bordering the Don Valley beside Bayview Avenue. The development, later dubbed the Bayview Ghost, was a rallying cry for her campaign. She beat Allen by 5,065 votes to 3,458. Davidson was a dedicated politician, often attending community meetings, up to 40 per month. She was also a formidable debater, with an abrupt and abrasive style that annoyed her fellow council members. Yet the voters loved her and she was re-elected six times.

In 1966, East York was amalgamated with the Town of Leaside, and Davidson found herself pitted against Leaside mayor Beth Nealson in an election dubbed the "Battle of the Belles" to become the first mayor of the newly amalgamated Borough of East York. "If you want someone beautiful and elegant, or glamorous, I'm not that", Davidson said during the campaign. Despite spending the final days of the campaign in a hospital recovering from a heart attack, she won the election handily. After amalgamation, Davidson was still mindful of local sentiment towards the neighbourhood name of Leaside, and, while not making it official, insisted that the name 'Leaside' be retained for any public building or space.

As mayor of East York, she sought to unite the new community by starting a centennial project. Her goal was the restoration of Todmorden Mills as a heritage museum. Despite mounting costs she reached her goal by raising funds through centennial grants and from private donations. The museum was opened on 22 May 1967. She remained an honorary curator until her death. Davidson also started and served as the first director of the East York Foundation in 1966, which was created with a goal of preserving cultural holdings and artifacts. Another of Davidson's lasting achievements was the founding of the "East York Dominion Day Parade". The 1 July celebration was first started in 1957 even before she joined the council in 1958. The parade is a local tradition, and even in post-amalgamation Toronto, it continues to be held annually.

Davidson had a reputation for never mincing words. She would always say what was on her mind. When she ran for reeve in 1960 she called one of her opponents, Leslie Saunders, "bigoted, pigheaded and, in his attitude to women, a throwback to the stone age". During the East York mayoralty race in 1966 she called Beth Nealson a "wish-washy, prissy, sweetheart". Metro chairman Fred Gardiner once complained that she had "taken a yard" off his back. Davidson replied that he still had plenty of hide left to spare. She referred to Metro chairman Albert Campbell as a "maundering chairman, inclined to regard other councillors as grade one dunces ruled by himself as schoolmaster." In one exchange with Campbell, she retorted "Don't be addled man. Don't talk stupid!" Nevertheless, she had her supporters. Fellow Metro councillor, Bill Kilbourn spoke fondly of her. "Decent, fearless, independent. True was a thorn in the flesh of the smooth men at Metro (council)."

In 1971, during her last term as mayor she made the surprising announcement that she wished to run as a Liberal in the next provincial election. She was nominated as the Liberal candidate in the riding of York East. She said she ran because she was frustrated by the way the Conservative government was treating municipalities. She said "The municipalities can't go on taking more and more responsibilities and having less and less resources given them by a provincial government which is as whimsical as a 15-year-old girl with her first beau." During the election campaign she received a lot of press coverage but it focused on her age (then 70) and a certain perceived parochial attitude. Her small town persona carried well in the municipal world, but did not translate well to provincial politics. She lost badly to the Conservative incumbent Arthur Meen. (Note: York East results, Provincial election, 21 October 1971: Arthur Meen (PC), 17295; True Davidson (L), 9,751; B. Eastman (NDP), 7,050.)

== Retirement and death ==
Davidson retired from politics in 1972. She continued to remain involved by writing a twice-weekly column on local affairs for the Toronto Sun. She also wrote occasionally for the Toronto Star and provided commentaries for CBC Radio. In 1973, she published a book called The Golden Strings. Many had expected this to be an autobiography but instead she wrote about people whose lives had inspired her. One of the activities she focused on was her interest in environmentalism. She continued to serve as a member of the Metro Toronto and Region Conservation Authority (TRCA). As reeve, one of her first acts had been to donate 245 acres (99 ha) of land in the Don Valley to the TRCA, because she said that the borough did not have the funds to properly manage it. She stated her environmental beliefs as, "...prudent ecological management which the wise and far-seeing tell us is absolutely necessary for the future of the race."

Davidson used some of her free time to travel to Europe and Australia. On one of her trips she had an accidental fall and an x-ray revealed a cancerous growth. She was diagnosed with cancer and died at Toronto East General Hospital on 18 September 1978.

== Honours and legacy ==
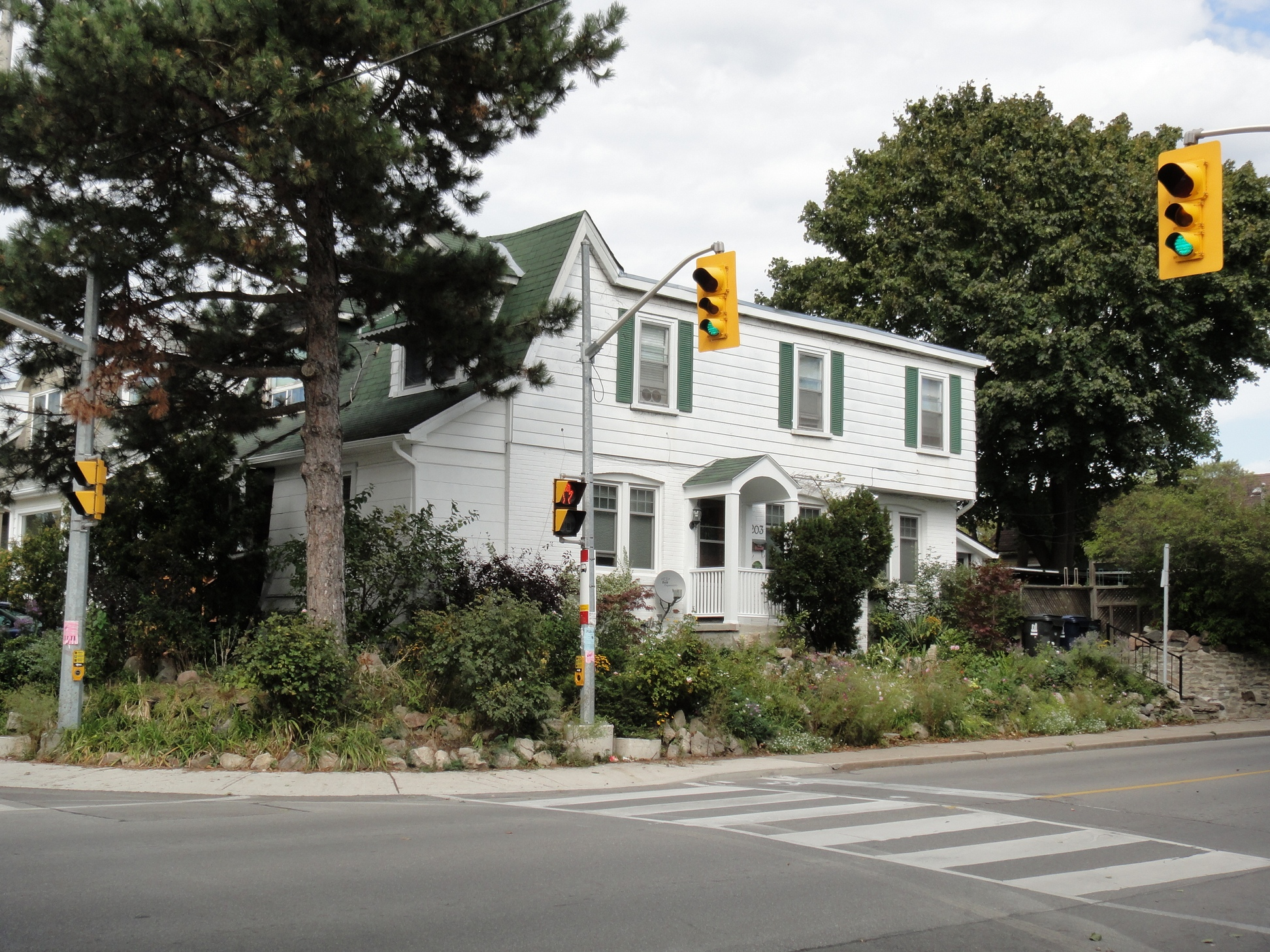
True Davidson House in East York.

When Davidson retired from East York politics the borough named a senior's residence after her, the True Davidson Acres. In 1971, she was awarded an honorary doctorate from Victoria College as a Doctor of Sacred Letters. Davidson was made a Member of the Order of Canada in 1973, received the Queen's Jubilee Medal in 1977 and, just before her death in 1978, was awarded an honorary doctorate from York University, where she had recently enrolled as a doctoral student in Canadian literature. After her death, the "True Davidson Collection of Canadian Literature" was established at York University, based on a donation of her personal papers.

In 1997, just before amalgamation, one of the last acts of the East York Council was to rename the meeting place as the True Davidson Council Chamber. In the late 1990s, a new residential development was built on the same lands as the Bayview Ghost. In 1999, the East York Community Council named one of the new streets of the development "True Davidson Drive" in honour of her impact on the area. In 2001, the city designated her former residence at 203 Woodmount Avenue as "True Davidson House". Her first house in East York was on Linsmore Crescent but she had moved to Woodmount Avenue and spent the majority of her time here. The local Meals on Wheels agency is named for her, as is a park near Coxwell Avenue and Cosburn Avenue.

== Selected works ==
- Canada in story and song; a pageant. Toronto: J.M. Dent & Sons, Ltd. 1927.
- Muses of the modern day and other days. Toronto: J.M. Dent & Sons, Ltd. 1931.
- The Brampton Story. Toronto: Charters Publishing Company Limited. 1953.
- The Golden Strings. Toronto: Griffin House. 1973. ISBN 0-88760-067-0.
- The Golden years of East York. Toronto: Centennial College Press. 1976. ASIN B0DM1KDVFC.
