= Steve Otto =

Canadian politician

Steven Otto
- Official 1968 portrait

Member of Parliament for York East
- In office 1962–1972
- Preceded by: Robert Henry McGregor
- Succeeded by: Ian MacLachlan Arrol

Personal details
- Born: 25 December 1921 Poland
- Died: 16 January 1989 (aged 67)
- Party: Liberal
- Profession: Lawyer

Steven Otto (25 December 1921 – 16 January 1989) was a Canadian politician.

Born in Poland, Otto was a businessman and lawyer before being elected to the House of Commons of Canada for the riding of York East in the 1962 federal election. A Liberal, he was re-elected in 1963, 1965, and 1968. From 1971 to 1972 he was the Parliamentary Secretary to the Minister of Supply and Services. He was defeated in the 1972 election.

On 16 January 1989, Otto's fourteen-metre sailboat, the Optimistra, hit a rock and capsized off the southeast coast of Cuba. He was presumed to have drowned and his body was never recovered.

1962 Canadian federal election: York East
Party	Candidate	Votes
Liberal	Steve Otto	16,963
Progressive Conservative	Robert Henry McGregor	16,827
New Democratic Party	Sid Dunkley	10,940
Social Credit	Norman Elston	609

1963 Canadian federal election: York East
Party	Candidate	Votes
Liberal	Steve Otto	21,038
Progressive Conservative	Willis Blair	14,777
New Democratic Party	Sid Dunkley	11,234
Social Credit	James Mackie	349

1965 Canadian federal election: York East
Party	Candidate	Votes
Liberal	Steve Otto	18,840
Progressive Conservative	William Whipper Watson	15,312
New Democratic Party	William Smith	13,045
Social Credit	R. Beacock	194

1968 Canadian federal election: York East
Party	Candidate	Votes
Liberal	Steve Otto	19,320
Progressive Conservative	Kechin Wang	12,155
New Democratic Party	Eamon Park	11,921

1972 Canadian federal election: York East
Party	Candidate	Votes
Progressive Conservative	Ian MacLachlan Arrol	18,729
Liberal	Steve Otto	18,039
New Democratic Party	W. Thomas Beckett	10,876
No affiliation	Janina Klee	113
No affiliation	Harold Rowbottom	104
