= Alan Cockeram =

Canadian politician

Alan Cockeram, DSO (December 6, 1894 – September 11, 1957) was a mining executive, military officer and Canadian politician who sat in the House of Commons of Canada in the 1940s. He is best known for having given up his York South seat in order to give Conservative leader Arthur Meighen an opportunity to enter parliament only to see the upstart Co-operative Commonwealth Federation (CCF) defeat Meighen in a by-election.

== Biography ==
Cockeram was born in Devon, England and emigrated to Canada in 1913, where he found employment with the Canadian Bank of Commerce in Montreal. He later transferred to a bank branch in Brockville, Ontario. When World War I broke out he enlisted as a private in the 21st Battalion of Kingston with which he saw service in France, earned three field commissions, was wounded three times, and awarded the Distinguished Service Order after wiping out a German machine-gun nest.

On his return to Canada he joined the F. M. Connell Mining, Exploration and Development Company. In 1929 he joined the Irish Regiment of Canada, becoming lieutenant colonel and commanding officer of the reserve regiment in 1935. He helped organize the defences Halifax at the beginning of World War II.

He was first elected to the House of Commons in the 1940 federal election as a National Government candidate, which was the banner under which Conservatives were running in that election. He served as parliamentary whip until he rejoined the Irish Regiment, first battalion for active service in World War II as second-in-command, with the rank of major.

He resigned from parliament on November 27, 1941, in order to enable newly elected Conservative leader Arthur Meighen to contest York South in a by-election; however, Meighen was defeated in what had been a safe Tory seat by CCF candidate Joseph Noseworthy in an upset victory which gave the socialist party a major breakthrough in Ontario. Cockeram defeated Noseworthy in the 1945 federal election and was defeated by Noseworthy four years later in the 1949 federal election.

Returning to his career in mining, Cockeram served as president of Peruvian Mines and Minerals and of Merchant Mining Ltd. He died in New York in 1957 while en route to Peru.
