= John McMurrich =

Canadian politician

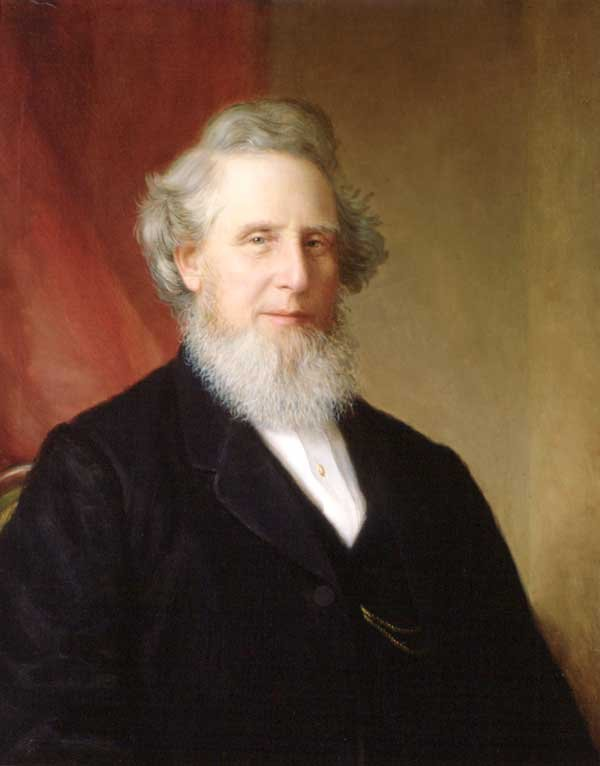

Ontario MPP
- In office 1867–1871
- Preceded by: Riding established
- Succeeded by: Alfred Boultbee
- Constituency: York North

Personal details
- Born: February 3, 1804 Paisley, Scotland
- Died: February 13, 1883 (aged 79) Toronto, Ontario
- Party: Liberal
- Occupation: Businessman

John McMurrich (February 3, 1804 – February 13, 1883) was a businessman and political figure in Canada West and later Ontario.

He was born near Paisley, Scotland in 1804 and came to Upper Canada in 1833 to work in a York (Toronto) dry goods business affiliated with a Glasgow-based firm. He became a partner in 1837. McMurrich served on Toronto city council in 1860. He was elected to the Legislative Council of the Province of Canada in an 1862 by-election. He served on the Public School Board in Toronto for a number of years and was chairman from 1865 to 1867 and in 1870. In 1867, he was elected to the Legislative Assembly of Ontario for York North as a Liberal; he was defeated in 1871. He was a member of the Toronto Board of Trade and served as president for a number of Toronto companies. He died in Toronto in 1883.

His eldest son, William Barclay McMurrich, was a mayor of Toronto. His second son, George McMurrich, was a long-time alderman on Toronto City Council. Another son, J. Playfair McMurrich, became a distinguished zoologist.

== Legacy ==
McMurrich name bears on a few places in Ontario:

- McMurrich/Monteith is a municipality and census subdivision in Ontario named after McMurrich.
- McMurrich Street and McMurrich Junior Public School in Toronto are named in his honour.

== Electoral history ==
1867 Ontario general election: York North
Party	Candidate	Votes	%
Liberal	John McMurrich	1,369	54.20
Conservative	Alfred Boultbee	1,157	45.80
Total valid votes		2,526	73.90
Eligible voters		3,418	
Liberal pickup new district.			
Source: Elections Ontario

1871 Ontario general election: York North
Party	Candidate	Votes	%	±%
Conservative	Alfred Boultbee	1,306	50.10	+4.29
Liberal	John McMurrich	1,301	49.90	−4.29
Turnout		2,607	66.64	−7.26
Eligible voters		3,912		
Conservative gain from Liberal		Swing		+4.29
Source: Elections Ontario
