= Ian MacLachlan Arrol =

Canadian politician

Member of Parliament for York East
- In office 1972–1974
- Preceded by: Steve Otto
- Succeeded by: David Collenette

Personal details
- Born: February 20, 1924
- Died: June 16, 2000 (aged 76)
- Party: Progressive Conservative
- Profession: Radio announcer, teacher

Ian MacLachlan Arrol (February 20, 1924 – June 16, 2000) was Member of Parliament for the federal riding of York East, elected as a Progressive Conservative in the Robert Stanfield-led resurgence of 1972. He was defeated in the Liberal sweep of 1974.

== Radio career ==
Arrol was a radio announcer in Vancouver and Calgary in the 1940s and 1950s until graduating from University of British Columbia and teachers college, teaching in Vancouver in the early 1960s and for the Scarborough Board of Education (at Woburn Collegiate Institute) in the late 1960s and early 1970s. He also was a reporter with the Daily Colonist in Victoria BC in the mid-1960s.

== Political career ==
Arrol's first foray into electoral politics was with a different party: he ran as a Co-operative Commonwealth Federation (CCF) candidate in the 1948 Alberta general election in the electoral district of Medicine Hat. He finished a distant third, losing to longtime Social Credit incumbent John Robinson.

== Electoral record ==
1972 Canadian federal election: York East
Party	Candidate	Votes
Progressive Conservative	Ian MacLachlan Arrol	18,729
Liberal	Steve Otto	18,039
New Democratic Party	W. Thomas Beckett	10,876
No affiliation	Janina Klee	113
No affiliation	Harold Rowbottom	104

1974 Canadian federal election: York East
Party	Candidate	Votes
Liberal	David Collenette	20,682
Progressive Conservative	Ian MacLachlan Arrol	17,593
New Democratic Party	Kay MacPherson	9,818
Marxist–Leninist	John Dennis	150
Communist	Dan Hammond	128
Independent	Paul M. Miniato	121
