= Robert Hardy Small =

Canadian politician

Member of Parliament for Danforth
- In office August 1953 – June 1962
- Preceded by: Joseph Henry Harris
- Succeeded by: Reid Scott

Personal details
- Born: 15 December 1891 Morrow, Ohio, United States
- Died: 5 October 1976 (aged 84) Toronto, Ontario, Canada
- Party: Progressive Conservative
- Spouse: May Moffatt (d. 1961)
- Profession: advertising executive

Robert Hardy Small (15 December 1891 – 5 October 1976) was a Progressive Conservative party member of the House of Commons of Canada. Although a lifelong Toronto resident, Small was born in Morrow, Ohio, United States, near Cincinnati, when his parents were temporarily outside of Canada.

== Career ==
Small studied at the Ontario College of Art before working for an advertising company called E. L. Ruddy (since acquired by Claude Neon). He became the company's production manager until his retirement.

Between 1947 and 1951, Small was the Canadian Grand Master of the Orange Lodge, in which he participated for much of his life. In 1928, he was caught in controversy when he spoke out against federal plans to issue government cheques in both English and French, as proposed in a Liberal party private member's bill.

Small was first elected at the Danforth, riding in the 1953 general election. He served three consecutive terms in Parliament before finishing second to New Democratic candidate Reid Scott in the 1962 election. Small was again unsuccessful at Danforth in the 1963 election, placing third in that campaign behind Scott and Liberal candidate John Whitehead.

== Death ==
On 5 October 1976, Small died at his Toronto home. He was predeceased by his wife in 1961, and by a son in World War II, but survived by one daughter.
