= Joseph W. Noseworthy =

Canadian politician

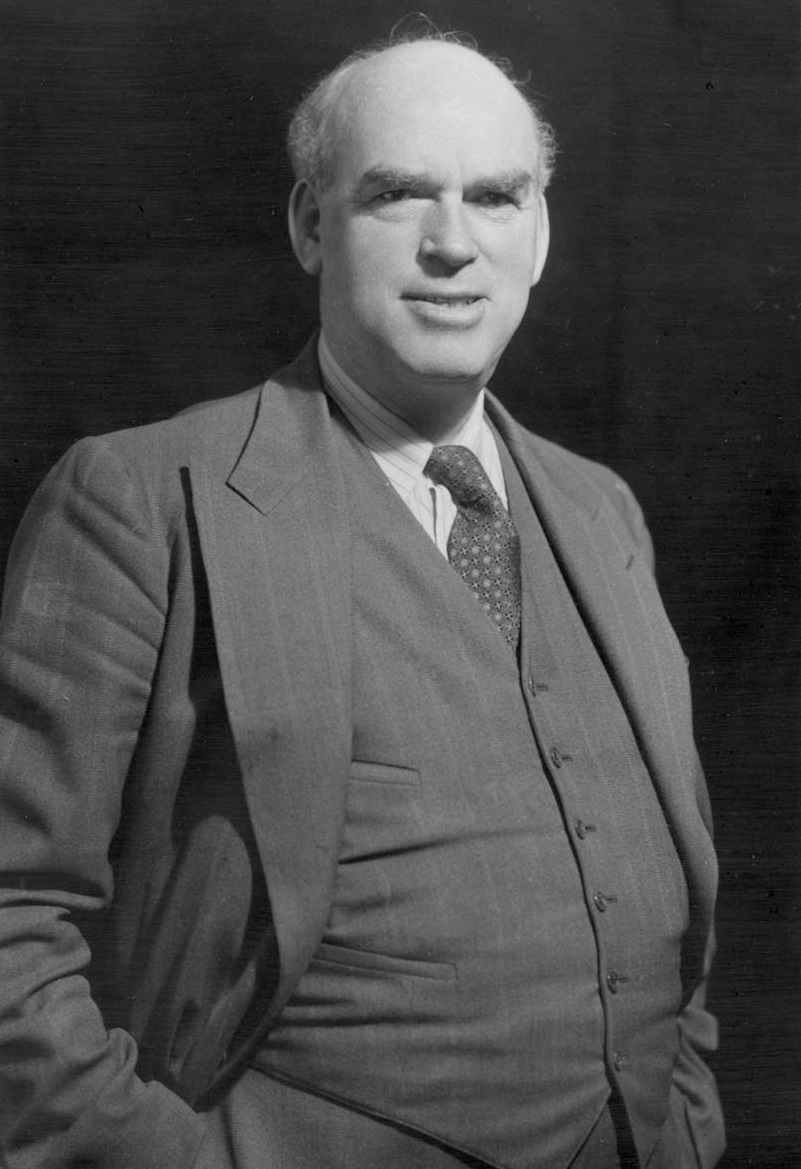

Member of Parliament for York South
- In office 1949–1956
- Preceded by: Alan Cockeram
- Succeeded by: William Beech
- In office 1942–1945
- Preceded by: Alan Cockeram
- Succeeded by: Alan Cockeram

Personal details
- Born: November 25, 1888 Lewisporte, Newfoundland
- Died: March 30, 1956 (aged 67)
- Party: C.C.F.
- Profession: Teacher; Insurance Salesman

Joseph William Noseworthy (November 25, 1888 – March 30, 1956) was a Canadian politician. He was a Co-operative Commonwealth Federation member of the federal parliament from 1942 to 1945 and again from 1949 to 1956. He died in office on March 30, 1956.

== Background ==
Noseworthy was born in Lewisporte, Newfoundland and grew up working on fishing boats and getting his education when he could. As a teenager he worked as a lumberman before obtaining his teaching certificate at the age of 18. In 1910, he entered Albert College in Belleville, Ontario and paid his tuition by working with Frontier College going into the bush and teaching lumberjacks how to read and continued working for Frontier College when he attended Victoria College in Toronto.

Finishing his education at the age of 30, he sold insurance for a year before joining North Toronto Collegiate Institute as a history teacher. After seven years, he moved to Vaughan Road Collegiate Institute in the suburb of York, Toronto becoming head of the English department. Noseworthy became the President of the Ontario Secondary School Teachers' Federation in 1938 serving a one year term.

== Politics ==
He joined the Co-operative Commonwealth Federation (CCF), and was its candidate in the riding of York South in the 1940 federal election where he was defeated.

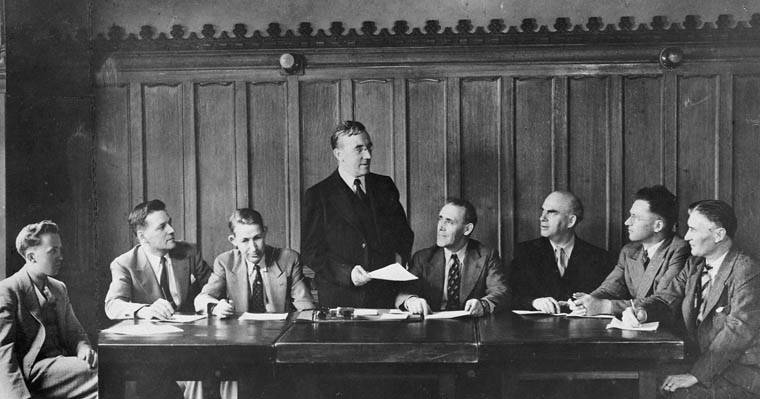
Federal CCF Caucus, in 1942 with new leader M.J. Coldwell. Left to right, Tommy Douglas, George Hugh Castleden, Angus MacInnis, Coldwell, Clarie Gillis, Joseph W. Noseworthy, Sandy Nicholoson, and Percy Wright.

He stood again for the CCF when a by-election was called after the sitting Conservative Member of Parliament (MP) resigned in order to allow the new Conservative leader, former Prime Minister Arthur Meighen, to win a seat in the House of Commons of Canada. It was tradition for the Liberals and Conservatives not to run against the other party's leader in by-elections, but the CCF did not accept this convention. William Lyon Mackenzie King and the Liberals were determined to block Meighen's return to politics: King didn't want the vocally pro-Conscription Meighen back in Parliament (see Conscription Crisis of 1944). The two men also had an intense rivalry dating from the 1920s when Meighen had previously been Tory leader. The Liberals donated money to Noseworthy's campaign, and encouraged their members to support his candidacy. Conversely, the Ontario Liberal Party and Premier of Ontario, Mitchell Hepburn, were opposed to King's conscription stance, and decided to put their support behind Meighen in the by-election.

The result on February 9, 1942, was a major upset and breakthrough for the CCF, with Noseworthy being elected by a margin of 5,000 votes. The defeat forced Meighen out of public life. Noseworthy was defeated in the subsequent 1945 general election by Alan Cockeram who had held the riding prior to the 1942 by-election, but returned as York South's MP in the 1949 election and remained in Parliament until his death.

Noseworthy was an active parliamentarian and defended the rights of immigrants and minorities. At one point, he embarrassed the Minister of Citizenship and Immigration, Walter Harris, by tabling a letter Harris had written that made it clear that the government intended to use provisions of the new 1952 Immigration Act to exclude non-whites.
