= Alfred Boultbee =

Canadian politician

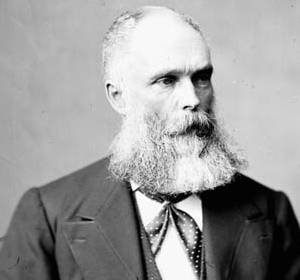

Member of Parliament for York East
- In office 1878–1882
- Preceded by: James Metcalfe
- Succeeded by: Alexander Mackenzie

Ontario MPP
- In office 1871–1874
- Preceded by: John McMurrich
- Succeeded by: Joseph Henry Widdifield
- Constituency: York North

Personal details
- Born: March 5, 1828 Hampshire, England
- Died: December 29, 1901 (aged 73)
- Party: Ontario Conservative 1871-1875; Federal Conservative 1878-1882
- Spouse: Caroline Augusta (m. 1857)
- Occupation: Lawyer

Alfred Boultbee (March 5, 1828 – December 29, 1901) was an Ontario lawyer and political figure. He represented York North in the Legislative Assembly of Ontario from 1871 to 1874 and York East in the House of Commons of Canada as a Conservative member from 1878 to 1882.

He was born in Hampshire, England in 1829 and came to Ancaster Township in Upper Canada with his family in 1836. He articled in law with William Notman and was called to the bar in 1855. He began practice in Newmarket, but later joined Thomas McCulloch Fairbairn in a practice in Peterborough. After the death of Fairbairn in 1874, he moved his practice to Toronto. In 1857, he married Caroline Augusta, the daughter of George Hamilton. He served as reeve for Newmarket for a number of years. With others, Boultbee established the North York Sentinel and served as its editor for several years. He helped organize the local Freemason lodge and held an office in the Grand Lodge of Canada.

== Electoral history ==
=== Federal ===
1878 Canadian federal election: York East
Party	Candidate	Votes
Conservative	Alfred Boultbee	1,526
Liberal	James Metcalfe	1,460

1882 Canadian federal election: York East
Party	Candidate	Votes
Liberal	Alexander Mackenzie	1,857
Conservative	Alfred Boultbee	1,749

1887 Canadian federal election: York East
Party	Candidate	Votes
Liberal	Alexander Mackenzie	2,552
Conservative	Alfred Boultbee	2,391

=== Provincial ===
1871 Ontario general election: York North
Party	Candidate	Votes	%	±%
Conservative	Alfred Boultbee	1,306	50.10	+4.29
Liberal	John McMurrich	1,301	49.90	−4.29
Turnout		2,607	66.64	−7.26
Eligible voters		3,912		
Conservative gain from Liberal		Swing		+4.29
Source: Elections Ontario
