= William George Beech =

Canadian politician

Member of Parliament for York South
- In office 1957–1962
- Preceded by: Joseph W. Noseworthy
- Succeeded by: David Lewis

Ontario MPP
- In office 1951–1955
- Preceded by: Ted Jolliffe
- Succeeded by: Donald C. MacDonald
- Constituency: York South

Reeve of York
- In office 1949–1951
- Preceded by: Charles J. McMaster
- Succeeded by: Frederick W. Hall

Personal details
- Born: June 4, 1898 London, England
- Died: May 28, 1971 (aged 72) York, Toronto, Ontario, Canada
- Party: Federal PC, 1957-1962; Ontario PC, 1951-1955
- Spouse: Marie Beech (née Newman)
- Occupation: Industrial engineer/businessman

William George Beech (June 4, 1898 – May 28, 1971) was a mid-20th century Canadian politician who represented York Township at all three levels of government.

== Background ==
Beech was born in London, England and moved to Canada with his parents when he was very young. Beech served with the Canadian Expeditionary Force during World War I, joining the army at 16, and was wounded at Vimy Ridge. He was an industrial engineer, and then in 1950 owned a travel agency in the York Township.

== Politics ==
Beech was a member of the council for York Township and was reeve from 1948 to 1951. He defeated Ontario Co-operative Commonwealth Federation (CCF) leader Ted Jolliffe to represent York South in the Legislative Assembly of Ontario for the Progressive Conservative Party of Ontario in 1951. He was defeated by the new CCF leader, Donald C. MacDonald, in the provincial election held in 1955 but was elected to a seat in the House of Commons two years later and again in 1958. Beech was defeated in his re-election attempt for the federal seat in 1962 by David Lewis of the New Democratic Party (NDP), a future leader of the federal NDP. It was notable that Beech won or lost his seats to three different leaders of the CCF/NDP. He ran again, and was defeated in the April 1963 Canadian general election. He died on May 28, 1971, in the Borough of York (as York Township was renamed in 1967), after a brief illness.
