= C. B. Macpherson =

Canadian political scientist (1911–1987)

C. B. Macpherson OC FRHistS FRSC
- Born: Crawford Brough Macpherson; 18 November 1911; Toronto, Ontario, Canada
- Died: 22 July 1987 (aged 75); Toronto, Ontario, Canada
- Spouse: Kay Macpherson (m. 1943)

Academic background
- Education: University of Toronto; London School of Economics
- Academic advisor: Harold Laski
- Influences: T. H. Green; Leonard Hobhouse; Karl Marx; J. S. Mill; Otto van der Sprenkel; R. H. Tawney

Academic work
- Discipline: Political science
- Sub-discipline: Political economy; political theory
- Institutions: University of Toronto
- Doctoral students: Bernard Avishai; Ed Broadbent
- Notable works: The Political Theory of Possessive Individualism (1962)
- Notable ideas: Possessive individualism

Crawford Brough Macpherson OC FRHistS FRSC (11 November 1911 – 22 July 1987) was a Canadian political scientist who taught political theory at the University of Toronto.

== Life ==
Macpherson was born on 18 November 1911 in Toronto, Ontario. After graduating from the University of Toronto Schools, he received his undergraduate degree from the University of Toronto in 1933. He then earned a Master of Science degree in economics at the London School of Economics where he studied under the supervision of Harold Laski; (Note: His master's thesis was titled Voluntary Associations Within the State, 1900–1934, with Special Reference to the Place of Trade Unions in Relation to the State in Great Britain.) he joined the faculty of the University of Toronto in 1935. At that time a Doctor of Philosophy degree in the social sciences was uncommon, but some twenty years later he submitted a collection of sixteen published papers to the London School of Economics and was awarded the Doctor of Science degree in economics. These papers were then published in 1953 edition as the book, Democracy in Alberta: The Theory and Practice of a Quasi-Party System. (Note: For further information, see Leiss 1988.) In 1956 he became a professor of Political Economy at the University of Toronto.

He took several sabbaticals on fellowships which were often spent at English universities including an Overseas Fellowship at Churchill College, Cambridge.

Macpherson gave the annual Massey Lectures in 1964. He was made an Officer of the Order of Canada, Canada's highest civilian honour, in 1976.

Following his death, a two-part documentary on his life and work aired on CBC Radio's Ideas program.

The Canadian Political Science Association presents an annual C. B. Macpherson Prize for the best book on political theory written by a Canadian.

Macpherson died on 22 July 1987. He was survived by his wife, noted Canadian feminist Kathleen "Kay" Macpherson.

== Macpherson's project ==
In 1976, Macpherson was criticized from some on both the left and the right. In response, he claimed that what he had always been trying to do was to "work out a revision of liberal-democratic theory, a revision that clearly owed a great deal to [Karl] Marx, in the hope of making that theory more democratic while rescuing that valuable part of the liberal tradition which is submerged when liberalism is identified as synonymous with capitalist market relations." According to Robert Meynell, Macpherson's combination of Marx's political economy with T. H. Green's ethical liberalism is best understood as left-leaning neo-Hegelian Canadian idealism. In the 1980s, democratic socialism seemed to be in retreat with the rise of New Right–inspired governments that challenged and undermined the mixed economy and welfare state.

== Political theories ==
Macpherson's best-known contribution to political philosophy is the theory of "possessive individualism", in which an individual is conceived as the sole proprietor of his or her skills and owes nothing to society for them. These skills (and those of others) are a commodity to be bought and sold on the open market, and in such a society is demonstrated a selfish and unending thirst for consumption which is considered the crucial core of human nature. Macpherson spent most of his career battling these premises, but perhaps the greatest single exposition of this view can be found in The Political Theory of Possessive Individualism, where Macpherson examines the function of this particular kind of individualism in Thomas Hobbes, James Harrington, and John Locke (and several writers in between, including the Levellers) and its resulting pervasiveness throughout most liberal literature of the period. An avowed socialist, he believed that this culture of possessive individualism prevented individuals from developing their powers of rationality, moral judgment, contemplation and even friendship and love. These were the "truly human powers", Macpherson claimed. His thesis that Hobbes gave birth to the culture of possessive individualism has been challenged in different ways by Keith Thomas and David Lay Williams.

== On Milton Friedman ==
Essay VII of the Essays in Retrieval was titled "Elegant Tombstones: A Note on Friedman's Freedom" and was a direct challenge to certain assumptions of "freedom" made by Milton Friedman in Capitalism and Freedom. For Macpherson, capitalism was discordant with freedom. Part of the disagreement can be found in the differing interpretations of "freedom". For self-described "classical liberals" like Friedman, freedom is negative and is seen as an absence of constraints or freedom of choice. Following a tradition that began with G. W. F. Hegel, Macpherson viewed freedom as positive and defined it as the freedom to develop one's fullest human potential.

Friedman shows great disdain for positive freedom, associating it with Marxism and communism; he uses the term liberal with derision when referring to socialists, while contesting that he was a true liberal. Macpherson's criticisms of Friedman rest on three claims: (1) an "error" that tarnishes Friedman's attempt to demonstrate that capitalism organizes the economic activities of society without coercion; (2) the "inadequacy" of his assertion that capitalism is a necessary component of freedom, and that socialism is inconsistent with freedom; and (3) the "fallacy" of his evidence that capitalism is an ethically sound principle of distribution.

Macpherson contends that the coercion in capitalism is that one cannot choose not to be subjected to capitalist economic relations in a capitalist society. One can, of course, choose to change jobs, but one cannot choose not to work. For the exchange to be truly voluntary "the proviso that is needed is whether to enter into any exchange at all." The workers need money but cannot barter; therefore, they are coerced into the monetary system.

For Friedman, economic freedom needed to be protected because it ensured political freedom. Friedman appeals to historical examples that demonstrate where the largest amount of political freedom is found the economic model has been capitalist. In Friedman's words, "history suggests...that capitalism is a necessary condition for political freedom." Macpherson counters that the 19th-century examples that Friedman uses actually show that political freedom came first and those who gained this freedom, mainly property owning elites, used this new political freedom for their own best interests which meant to open the doors to unrestrained capitalism. It follows then, that capitalism will only be maintained as long as those who have political freedom deem it worthwhile. As the 19th century progressed and suffrage was expanded, there were corresponding restraints placed upon capitalism which indicates that political freedom and capitalism are at odds with one another. "At any rate", Macpherson contends, this "historical correlation scarcely suggests that capitalism is a necessary condition for political freedom."

Friedman also contended that where socialism links economics with politics, economics cannot act as a check on political power within a socialist society, as it can in a capitalist society. Macpherson countered that there is little evidence that economics does check political power. In fact, in many cases political power becomes subservient to economic power in the capitalist system. In this regard, socialism allows a better check on economic power toward political power than the converse under capitalism. Macpherson accuses Friedman of supplanting a communist society for a socialist one; at the very least Friedman does not differentiate between the two.

Friedman believed that if most of the regulatory and welfare activities of Western states were discontinued, freedom would be advanced. This may be true on a negative conception of freedom, but not on Macpherson's positive conception. According to Macpherson, Friedman does not include any "ethical claims of equality" into his demand for what amounts to freedom of markets. Macpherson argues that most of the "classical liberals" of previous centuries, which Friedman claims to represent, would have rejected this idea outright.

== Works ==
- Democracy in Alberta: The Theory and Practice of a Quasi-Party System (1953)
- The Political Theory of Possessive Individualism: From Hobbes to Locke (1962)
- The Real World of Democracy (1965)
- Democratic Theory: Essays in Retrieval (1973)
- The Life and Times of Liberal Democracy (1977)
- Burke (Past Masters series) (1980)
- Introduction and editor of Second Treatise of Government by John Locke, Hackett Publishing Company (1980)
- Foreword to Leviathan by Thomas Hobbes, Penguin Classics Paperback (1982)
- The Rise and Fall of Economic Justice (1984)

== See also ==
- Idealism

== Notes ==
Academic offices
Preceded by Frank Underhill	Massey Lecturer; 1964	Succeeded by John Kenneth Galbraith
