= William Findlay Maclean =

Canadian politician

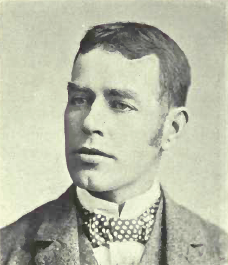

Member of Parliament for York South
- In office 1904–1926
- Preceded by: New riding (1903)
- Succeeded by: Robert Henry McGregor

Member of Parliament for York East
- In office 1892–1904
- Preceded by: Alexander Mackenzie
- Succeeded by: Riding abolished (1903)

Personal details
- Born: August 10, 1854 Ancaster, Wentworth County, Canada West
- Died: December 7, 1929 (aged 75) Toronto, Ontario, Canada
- Party: Conservative (1892-1900); Unionist (1918-21)
- Profession: Journalist

William Findlay Maclean (August 10, 1854 – December 7, 1929) was a Canadian politician.

Born in Ancaster, Wentworth County, Canada West, the son of John Maclean and Isabella Findlay, he was educated at the Hamilton Public School and the University of Toronto. A journalist, he established The Toronto World in 1880.

He ran unsuccessfully in North Wentworth for the Legislative Assembly of Ontario in the general elections of 1890, and in York East for the House of Commons of Canada in the general elections of 1891. He was first elected to the House of Commons in an 1892 by-election for the riding of York East after the death of the sitting MP and former Prime Minister, Alexander Mackenzie.

A Conservative, he would be re-elected 8 more times serving for 34 years for York East and York South until being defeated in 1926. Beginning in the 1900 federal election, Maclean stood as an "Independent Conservative" with the exception of 1917 election when he was elected as a Unionist.

He ran for Mayor of Toronto in the 1902 Toronto municipal election on a platform of public ownership but failed to unseat incumbent Mayor Oliver Aiken Howland in part because of his intention to sit both as mayor and as an MP simultaneously.

== Archives ==
There is a William Findlay Maclean fonds at Library and Archives Canada. Archival reference number is R5663.

== Electoral record ==
May 11, 1892 by-election on Mackenzie's death
Party	Candidate	Votes
Independent Conservative	William Findlay Maclean	acc.

1896 Canadian federal election: York East
Party	Candidate	Votes
Independent Conservative	William Findlay Maclean	3,907
Liberal	Henry R. Frankland	3,904

1900 Canadian federal election: York East
Party	Candidate	Votes
Independent Conservative	William Findlay Maclean	4,131
Liberal	N.W. Rowell	3,489
