= Joseph Henry Harris =

Canadian politician

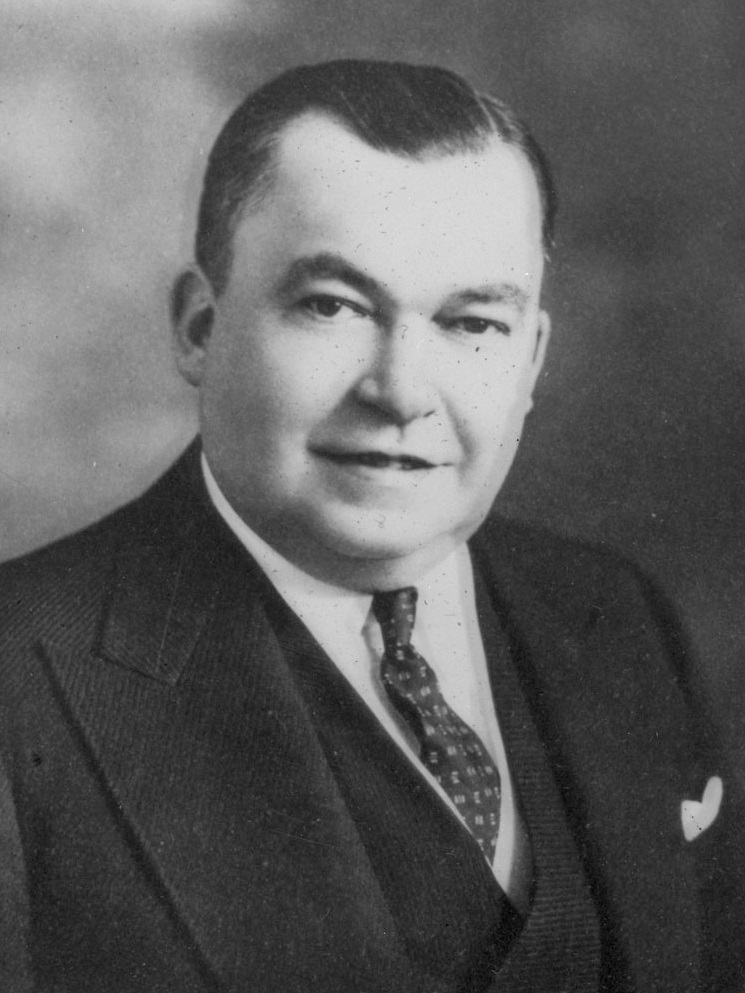

Member of Parliament for Danforth
- In office 1935–1952
- Preceded by: Riding established
- Succeeded by: Robert Small

Member of Parliament for Toronto—Scarborough
- In office 1925–1935
- Preceded by: Riding established
- Succeeded by: Riding abolished

Member of Parliament for York East
- In office 1921–1925
- Preceded by: Thomas Foster
- Succeeded by: Riding abolished

Personal details
- Born: December 13, 1888
- Died: October 24, 1952 (aged 63)
- Party: Conservative
- Profession: Businessman

Joseph Henry Harris (December 13, 1888 – October 24, 1952) was a Toronto manufacturer and politician. He was first elected to the House of Commons of Canada as the Conservative Member of Parliament for York East in the 1921 federal election. In 1938, he was a candidate at the Conservative leadership convention, placing third. He remained a Tory MP until his death in 1952.

== Business and commerce ==
Harris was a graduate of University of Toronto, President of W. Harris Co. Ltd., vice-president of Harris Coal Company, President of Dominion Canadian Organic Developments Ltd. (London, England)

== Member of Parliament ==
Harris represented the ridings of York East, Toronto—Scarborough and Danforth as a Member of Parliament in Canada for over 21 years.

== Toronto East General Hospital ==
As a resident of East Toronto, Harris activities and interests were many, characteristic of his interest in his fellow man and the welfare of the community he served, Harris was a spark for the campaign for funds for the Toronto East General Hospital in East York.

In this capacity, he acted as chairman of the board of governors for over twenty years, during this period his leadership and guidance were a tower of strength to the board during the establishment of policy and direction of the hospital.

== Electoral record ==
1921 Canadian federal election: York East
Party	Candidate	Votes
Conservative	Joseph Henry Harris	10,978
Liberal	Austin Gregory Ross	4,440
Labour	Harry Kirwin	3,074

== See also ==
- East York
- Scarborough
