= Robert Henry McGregor =

Canadian politician

The Honourable Robert H. McGregor PC

Member of Parliament for York East
- In office 14 October 1935 – 17 June 1962
- Preceded by: Riding created
- Succeeded by: Steve Otto

Member of Parliament for York South
- In office 14 September 1926 – 13 October 1935
- Preceded by: William Findlay Maclean
- Succeeded by: Earl Lawson

Personal details
- Born: Robert Henry McGregor; 1 March 1886 Toronto, Ontario, Canada
- Died: 25 January 1965 (aged 78) Toronto, Ontario, Canada
- Party: Progressive Conservative (1945-1965); National Government (1940-1945); Conservative (until 1940)
- Spouse(s): Olive Linda Moorcroft (m. 1907; died 1926) Estelle Orr (m. 1929)
- Children: 3
- Profession: Horticulturist

Robert Henry McGregor PC (1 March 1886 – 25 October 1965) was a long-time Canadian parliamentarian.

MacGregor was a contractor and horticulturalist by profession. He grew up in the Todmorden area of suburban Toronto, and was once an Elementary School student of a teacher named William Thomas Diefenbaker, father of Prime Minister John Diefenbaker. His initial experience in politics began in 1912 when he was appointed a school trustee for York Township. Following the formation of North York Township, he eventually became the first reeve of East York. In 1922, R.H. McGregor Elementary School, located in the eventual centre of East York, was erected and named in his honour.

He was first elected to the House of Commons of Canada in the 1926 federal election and sat continuously in the chamber for thirty-six years until his defeat in the 1962 federal election when he was 79 years old.

Originally elected as the Conservative Member of Parliament for York South, he switched to the new Toronto riding of York East when it was created for the 1935 federal election. He won election a total of eight consecutive times and was Dean of the House of Commons being its longest-serving member in the last years of his career.

Despite his long tenure in the House of Commons he spoke rarely and was nicknamed "Silent Bob" McGregor. His only recorded Parliamentary speech occurred when being feted in the House on his 74th birthday. On that occasion he remarked "If a good many hon. Members made fewer speeches in the House, they would be here longer."

Though never a member of Cabinet, he was elevated to the Queen's Privy Council for Canada on 21 December 1960, on Diefenbaker's recommendation in recognition of McGregor's long tenure of service.

== Electoral record ==
1935 Canadian federal election: York East
Party	Candidate	Votes
Conservative	Robert Henry McGregor	11,634
Liberal	Goldie Fleming	8,922
Co-operative Commonwealth	Arthur Henry Williams	7,864
Reconstruction	John Warren	4,054
Independent Liberal	Denis McCarthy	975

1940 Canadian federal election: York East
Party	Candidate	Votes
National Government	Robert Henry McGregor	16,741
Liberal	Robert Allan Irwin	12,429
Co-operative Commonwealth	Edward Bigelow (Ted) Jolliffe	4,931

1945 Canadian federal election: York East
Party	Candidate	Votes
Progressive Conservative	Robert Henry McGregor	19,908
Liberal	Donald Robert Morrison	14,036
Co-operative Commonwealth	Frederick C. Madill	8,654
Labor–Progressive	John Francis White	465
Social Credit	Carl Clark Pinkney	355

1949 Canadian federal election: York East
Party	Candidate	Votes
Progressive Conservative	Robert Henry McGregor	22,364
Liberal	Walter Melville Martin	21,398
Co-operative Commonwealth	Frederick C. Madill	13,448

1953 Canadian federal election: York East
Party	Candidate	Votes
Progressive Conservative	Robert Henry McGregor	11,062
Liberal	Joseph Douglas Thomas	8,701
Co-operative Commonwealth	True Davidson	5,815
Labor–Progressive	Margery Ferguson	472

1957 Canadian federal election: York East
Party	Candidate	Votes
Progressive Conservative	Robert Henry McGregor	17,236
Liberal	Ray S. Tower	9,078
Co-operative Commonwealth	Sid Dunkley	6,725
Social Credit	Henry F. Motton	620

1958 Canadian federal election: York East
Party	Candidate	Votes
Progressive Conservative	Robert Henry McGregor	22,900
Liberal	Ray. S. Tower	8,317
Co-operative Commonwealth	Sid Dunkley	6,033

1962 Canadian federal election: York East
Party	Candidate	Votes
Liberal	Steve Otto	16,963
Progressive Conservative	Robert Henry McGregor	16,827
New Democratic Party	Sid Dunkley	10,940
Social Credit	Norman Elston	609
