= Beth Nealson =

Mayor of Leaside, Canada (c. 1910 – 1994)

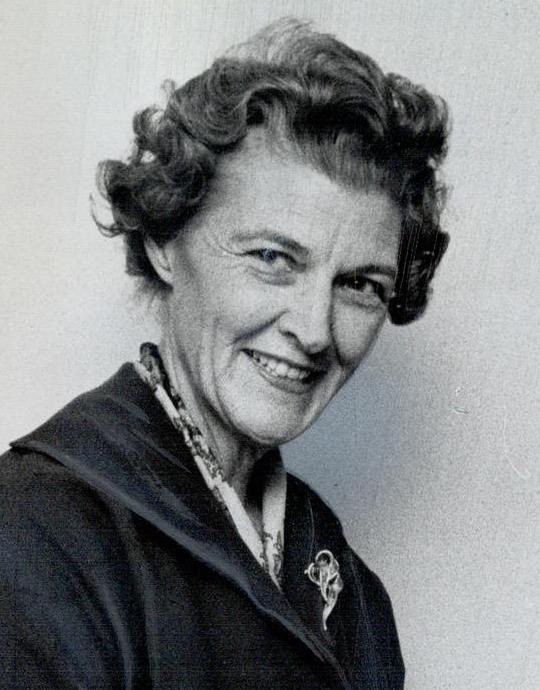

Mayor of Leaside, Ontario
- In office 1963–1966
- Preceded by: Lloyd Dickinson
- Succeeded by: District was amalgamated

Councillor in Leaside
- In office 1959–1962

Member, Leaside Board of Education
- In office 1952–1955

Personal details
- Born: c. 1910 Glen Ewen, Saskatchewan, Canada
- Died: 1994 (aged 83–84)

Beth Nealson (c. 1910 – 1994) was a Canadian politician, community planner, and journalist. She was elected mayor of Leaside, Ontario, in 1962, making her the first woman mayor in Metropolitan Toronto. Known as "Mrs. Leaside", Nealson was also the last mayor of Leaside, which was amalgamated with East York township in 1967. In 1966, Nealson ran and lost against True Davidson for the mayoralty of the newly formed borough of East York, in a historic election billed by the Canadian media as "The Battle of the Belles". Before becoming mayor, Nealson served on the Leaside Education Board and the Leaside town council, and was vice chairman of the Ontario Division of the Community Planning Association of Canada. Beth Nealson Drive in Toronto is named after her.

== Early life and education ==
Her full name was Frances Elizabeth Nealson, but over the course of her political career, she was known as Beth. Born in Glen Ewen, Saskatchewan, she grew up in Hamilton, Ontario, and graduated from McMaster University with a degree in English and history. She married businessman Nicholas Nealson while she was at university, and moved with him to Toronto in 1934. They moved to Leaside in 1939.

== Career ==
Nealson worked for a local newspaper as a reporter and columnist. She was elected to the board of education in Leaside in 1951, and served for four years starting in 1952, before "resigning out of frustration". Seven years later, she was elected to the Leaside municipal council. Nealson also served as vice chairman of the Ontario Division executive of the Community Planning Association of Canada.

=== Mayor of Leaside ===
Nealson was the first woman mayor of Leaside, Ontario, elected to the position on December 3, 1962. Nealson won by five votes following a recount on December 27, defeating the incumbent mayor, Lloyd Dickinson. She was the first woman to be elected as a mayor in Metropolitan Toronto. She served in office for three years, and became known as "Mrs. Leaside". While serving as mayor of Leaside, she was also a member of the Metro Council of Toronto, and head of the Metro Parks and Recreation Committee.

Nealson won reelection by a sizeable margin, defeating Dickinson again in 1964. However, in the mid-1960s, the province announced plans to reduce the number of municipalities within Metro Toronto. Although Nealson opposed the proposed amalgamation, in January 1966, the Ontario government announced its final plan to merge Leaside and the township of East York to form a new municipality the following year. The reeve of East York, True Davidson, had also fought against amalgamation, but declared publicly that the integration of Leaside into East York would be smooth. Initially, it was unclear whether Nealson and Davidson would face off for the office of mayor, as Davidson hinted that she would remain chief executive, while Nealson represented the borough in the Metro Council. The two women disagreed over how councillors should be elected in the new borough, but Nealson prevailed in pushing for a ward system, rather than the at-large system favored by Davidson.

=== "Battle of the Belles" ===
On October 5, 1966, Beth Nealson announced her candidacy for mayor of East York. Her main platform was municipal planning, as she promised to "protect single-family home areas from undesirable intrusion by high density apartments." A conflict over a proposed $20 million apartment project at Mallory Crescent, on the border between Leaside and East York, had raised complaints among Leaside residents that Davidson was "arrogant" and ignored ratepayers' associations, as well as concerns over taxes and infrastructure services. Councillor Royden Brigham of East York also joined the mayoral race, hoping to attract anti-Davidson voters.

The national news media including The Canadian Press and The Globe and Mail focused on comparing and contrasting the two female front-runners in the mayoral race. The Toronto Star noted that Nealson preferred suits and two-piece dresses, while Davidson had a penchant for fancy hats. Davidson herself developed a reputation for aggressively slamming her opponents, and focused her attention on defeating Nealson. During a debate, True Davidson famously joked that Beth Nealson would win if the election were a beauty contest: "If you want someone beautiful and elegant or glamorous, I'm not that." After making the comment, Davidson ran short of breath and had to cut her speech short, and spent the rest of the campaign in the hospital. Although Brigham paused his campaign, Nealson continued to reach out to voters, saying, "The ratepayers fill the rooms to hear the candidates and to deny them this would be entirely unfair ... I won't make any critical comments about True, but then I never have." Nealson herself was on antibiotics, dealing with a prolonged bronchial infection, which left her exhausted at several debates. Nealson ultimately placed third in the election, 200 votes behind Brigham.

=== Later years ===
Following her defeat, Nealson worked in public relations for the Metro Council and was a publicity co-ordinator for the Toronto Citizens' Centenary Committee. In 1972, a street was named after her, still known as Beth Nealson Drive. During the ribbon-cutting ceremony, Nealson was presented with a pair of shears by East York Mayor True Davidson. In 1976, Nealson testified in front of East York Council on the deterioration of the Thorncliffe Park apartment building where she lived, blaming the decline of the surrounding neighbourhood on "municipal neglect, poorly maintained parks, vandalism, and absentee landlords." She retired that year.

== Personal life ==
Nealson was a member of IODE Canada, and served as the education secretary for her local chapter, an experience which first led her to run for the board of education. She was a member of the board of VON Canada, the Board of Health, and the Canadian Voice of Women for Peace.

She had two children, including a son who predeceased her. Nealson moved to Barrie, Ontario, in 1984 to be closer to her daughter, Ann Watson. She died in 1994 and was survived by her daughter, as well as three grandchildren – two in England and one in Australia – and two great-grandchildren in Australia.
