= Jack Allen (Canadian politician) =

Canadian politician

Jack Raymond Allen (1909 — February 11, 1992) was a Canadian landscape gardener and politician who served as reeve of East York, Ontario from 1957 to 1960.

== "Bayview Ghost" ==
He is best known for his responsibility for the Bayview Ghost, a partially constructed apartment building and white elephant which was begun after Allen personally ordered that a building permit be issued to the developer, over the opposition of residents until public opposition to the development resulted in the municipal council overruling Allen. The council first attempted to revoke the permit and then, when that proved not to be possible, refused to extend water and sewer service to the site - resulting in construction being halted and a stand off which was not resolved for over twenty years. The controversy contributed to Allen's defeat by True Davidson in the 1960 municipal election.

== Early life ==
Allen was born in East York in 1909. He was provincial flyweight boxing champion in 1932. Allen served in the Royal Canadian Air Force during World War II and then attended the Niagara Parks Commission School of Horticulture where he trained as a landscape architect. His projects included Memorial Gardens and the grounds of Sunnybrook Hospital. Allen was blamed for construction of the Bayview Ghost, which contributed to his defeat.

== Political career ==
He first ran for East York's municipal council in December 1953 at the age of 34 and was elected on a platform of park development, street improvement, and improvement to the municipality's sewage and garbage disposal systems. He topped the ballot in the at large election to become vice-chairman of council, the second highest position in the township after reeve. He also served as chairman of the public works committee. He ran for reeve the next year but was defeated by incumbent Harry Simpson. Allen returned to council in mid-1955 by winning a by-election to fill a vacancy. Allen ran again for reeve in 1956, when Simpson decided not to run for re-election. He ran on a platform of preserving parkland, improving transportation, and low taxes, defeating Howard Chandler to win the position.

In 1957, Reeve Allen announced a plan to extend Cosburn Avenue through Taylor-Massey Creek valley, over the opposition of conservationists. Allen pushed the scheme through the planning committee but was blocked by East York council. In 1958, the Don Valley Conservation Association advocating donating the valley lands to the Metro Region Conservation Authority as part of a green belt, but Allen argued for developing the land for apartment buildings, calling the conservationists "a bunch of birdwatchers who don't know what they're meddling in." Allen was re-elected as reeve in the 1958 election that also saw several anti-development councillors elected, leading to conflicts over development, including the Bayview Ghost controversy.

True Davidson, then a councillor with a background in the Co-operative Commonwealth Federation, was persuaded to challenge Allen for the reeveship by ratepayers groups and conservationists. In the 1960 election, Davidson defeated Allen by more than 1,600 votes with a record voter turnout.

In 1960, he proposed that a stadium be built on the Railway Lands, where the Rogers Centre is now located.
