= Alan Redway =

Canadian politician (1935–2024)

The Honourable Alan Redway PC KC

Member of Parliament for Don Valley East
- In office November 21, 1988 – September 8, 1993
- Preceded by: Bill Attewell
- Succeeded by: David Collenette

Member of Parliament for York East
- In office September 4, 1984 – November 21, 1988
- Preceded by: David Collenette
- Succeeded by: Riding Abolished

Mayor of East York
- In office 1977–1982
- Preceded by: Leslie Saunders
- Succeeded by: David Johnson

Personal details
- Born: March 11, 1935
- Died: January 4, 2024 (aged 88)
- Party: Progressive Conservative
- Profession: Lawyer
- Cabinet: Housing (1989-1991)

Alan Redway, PC KC (March 11, 1935 – January 4, 2024) was a Canadian lawyer and politician.

After a career in municipal politics culminating in the role of mayor of East York, a borough of Metropolitan Toronto, Redway entered federal politics. He was elected to the House of Commons of Canada in the 1984 election as the Progressive Conservative Member of Parliament for York East, now Don Valley East.

In 1989, he was appointed to the Cabinet of Prime Minister Brian Mulroney as Minister of State for Housing, including responsibility for the Canada Mortgage and Housing Corporation. Redway, a Red Tory and supporter of public investment in housing, was forced to resign from Cabinet in 1991 for contravening the Aeronautics Act by joking that his friend was carrying a gun while boarding a plane at Ottawa International Airport. He was defeated in the 1993 Canadian election that reduced the Tories to only two seats in the House of Commons.

After leaving electoral politics, Redway was involved in anti-poverty work with the Daily Bread Food Bank as a member of its board of directors from 1996 to 2004. In 2000, as co-chair of the group "Putting Housing Back on the Public Agenda", he addressed the Ontario legislature's Standing Committee on Finance and Economic Affairs, lobbying the Progressive Conservative Ontario government of Mike Harris against the selling off of public housing units and for increased investment for supportive housing.

Redway practised civil law in Toronto as a partner of the firm Redway & Butler LLP (formerly Frost & Redway LLP) for many years. He retired in December 2010.

Redway died on January 4, 2024, at the age of 88.

1993 Canadian federal election: Don Valley East
Party	Candidate	Votes	%	±%
Liberal	David Collenette	21,511	54.1	+16.2
Progressive Conservative	Alan Redway	9,279	23.3	-21.4
Reform	Gordon E. Honsey	6,877	17.3	
New Democratic	Janice Waud Loper	1,538	3.9	-11.2
Libertarian	Mark Meschino	238	0.6	-0.7
Natural Law	Fred Fredeen	205	0.5	
Marxist–Leninist	Roger Carter	90	0.2	
Abolitionist	Michael Mazerolle	22	0.1	
Total valid votes		39,760	100.0	

1988 Canadian federal election: Don Valley East
Party	Candidate	Votes	%	±%
Progressive Conservative	Alan Redway	18,719	44.7	-9.7
Liberal	Yasmin Ratansi	15,881	37.9	+3.9
New Democratic	Brant Loper	6,310	15.1	+4.4
Libertarian	Mark Meschino	538	1.3	+0.6
Independent	David Smith	271	0.6	
Communist	Maria Kontopidis	155	0.4	
Total valid votes		41,874	100.0	

1984 Canadian federal election: York East
Party	Candidate	Votes
Progressive Conservative	Alan Redway	21,978
Liberal	David Collenette	16,519
New Democratic Party	Bill Gorelle	7,581
Libertarian	Chris Sorensen	243
Communist	Stathis Stathpoulos	171
