= Liquor Licence Board of Ontario =

Former regulatory agency

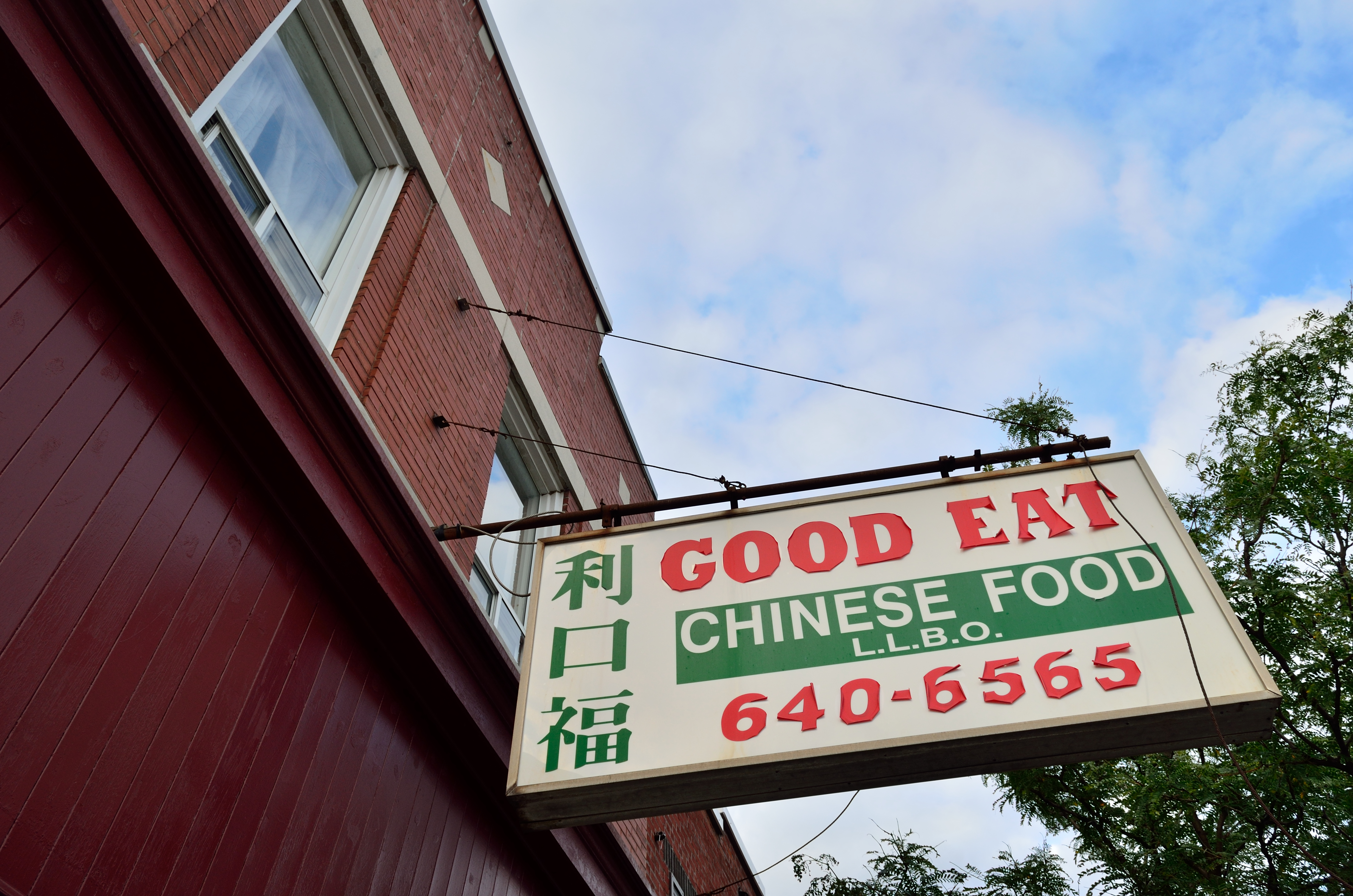
A restaurant sign referring to its LLBO licence (seen in 2015, long after the agency's demise)

Liquor Licence Board of Ontario was the regulatory agency responsible for issuing liquor permits and regulating the sale, service and consumption of alcoholic beverages to promote moderation and responsible use in Ontario. The agency was in operation from 1947 to 1998.

== History ==
Prior to the LLBO, the LCBO was the temporary agency responsible for issuing individual and vendor alcohol permits in the province following the end of prohibition in 1927. From 1916 to 1927, alcohol was banned in the province of Ontario under the Ontario Temperance Act.

Established in 1947 under the Liquor Licence Act, which permitted alcohol to be sold and consumed in public taverns for the first time since the First World War, the agency is not to be mistaken with the Liquor Control Board of Ontario, an alcohol retailer.

== Evolution of LLBO ==
The LLBO was replaced by the Alcohol and Gaming Commission of Ontario in 1998 under the Alcohol and Gaming Regulation and Public Protection Act passed in 1996.

The LLBO name lives on in signage and advertising for many eateries and entertainment establishments, including some opened well after the board’s dissolution, which display the name to indicate the location is legally licensed to serve alcohol, whereas the initialism for its successor, the AGCO, is rarely used for this purpose.
