= Governor's Bridge, Toronto =

Coordinates: 43.691°N 79.366°W

Governor's Bridge
- Neighbourhood
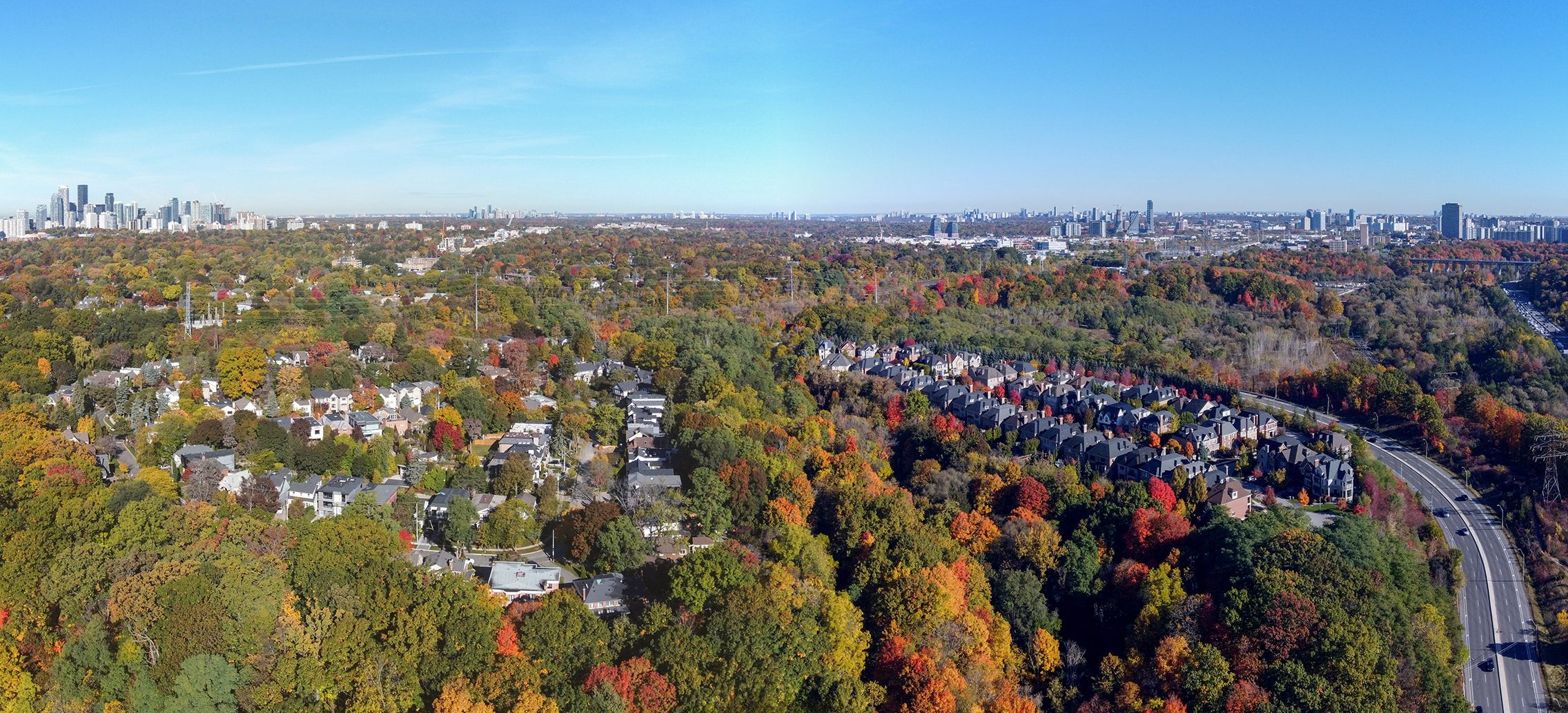
- Aerial view of Governor's Bridge in 2023

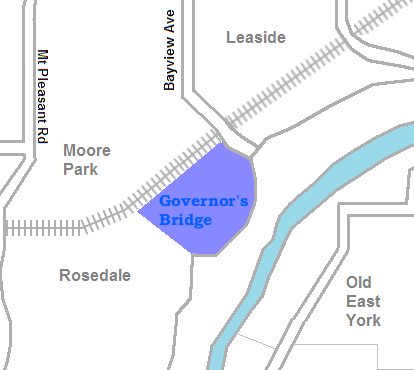
- Country: Canada
- Province: Ontario
- City: Toronto

Governor's Bridge, Toronto

Governor's Bridge is a bridge and small neighbourhood in Toronto, Ontario, Canada, located to the east of Rosedale and Moore Park neighbourhoods. Unlike them, it was part of the former city of East York. The neighbourhood is named for the Governor's Bridge that crosses the Moore Park Ravine from Douglas Crescent to Astley Avenue and connects the area to Rosedale. The bridge was built in 1923 and restored in 2000.

Governor's Bridge's boundaries are the Canadian Pacific Railroad to the north, Bayview Avenue to the south and east, and Mud Creek as part of the Moore Park Ravine to its intersection with Pottery Road to the west. It contains all residential properties on the streets currently known as Governor's Road, Nesbitt Drive, Douglas Crescent, True Davidson Drive and Hampton Park Crescent, as of May 1, 2009. The neighbourhood is divided into two sections by a smaller set of railway tracks.

== Western section ==
It is a very small neighbourhood with only a couple of hundred homes. The area was originally purchased and subdivided in 1911 by two prominent Toronto lawyers: William Douglas and Wallace Nesbitt. Each has a street in the neighbourhood named after him. Construction had to wait until the construction of Governor's Bridge in 1923 connected the area to the rest of the city. The bridge was named in honour of the Lieutenant-Governor of Ontario whose official residence, Chorley Park (Fourth Government House), was located just south of the bridge.

The west part of the neighbourhood was quickly built up during the Roaring Twenties boom period, and most of the houses date from this era. Many of them are ornamented with Spanish-style accents. This style was also very popular in California at the time, and was thus often featured and glamourized in films of the period. In its early history the area was thus sometimes nicknamed "Little Hollywood." It has remained an elite enclave that in recent years has seen many of the smaller bungalows replaced by much larger new homes.

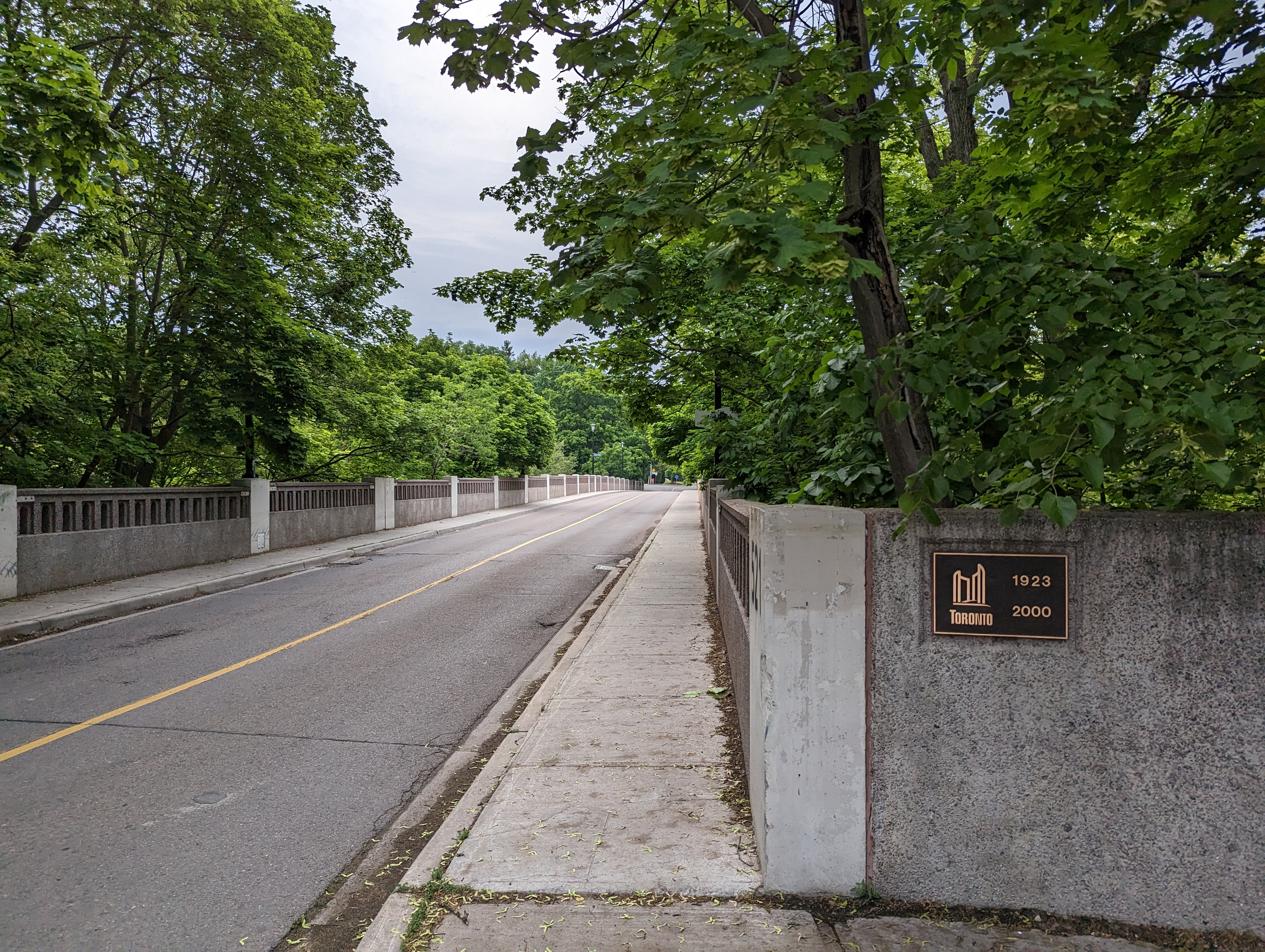
The Governor's Bridge is located in the neighbourhood's western section

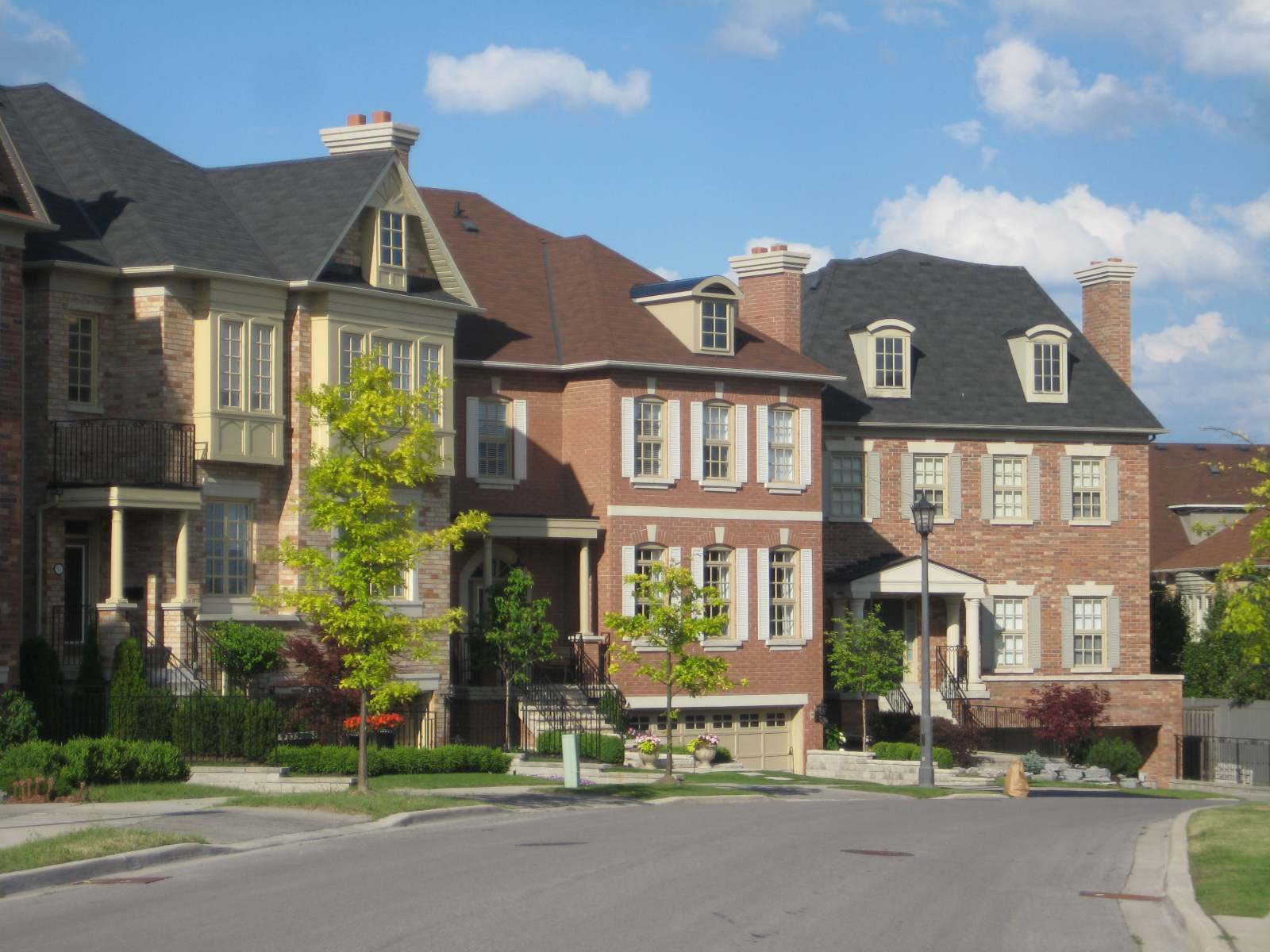
Houses in the newer eastern section of Governor's Bridge

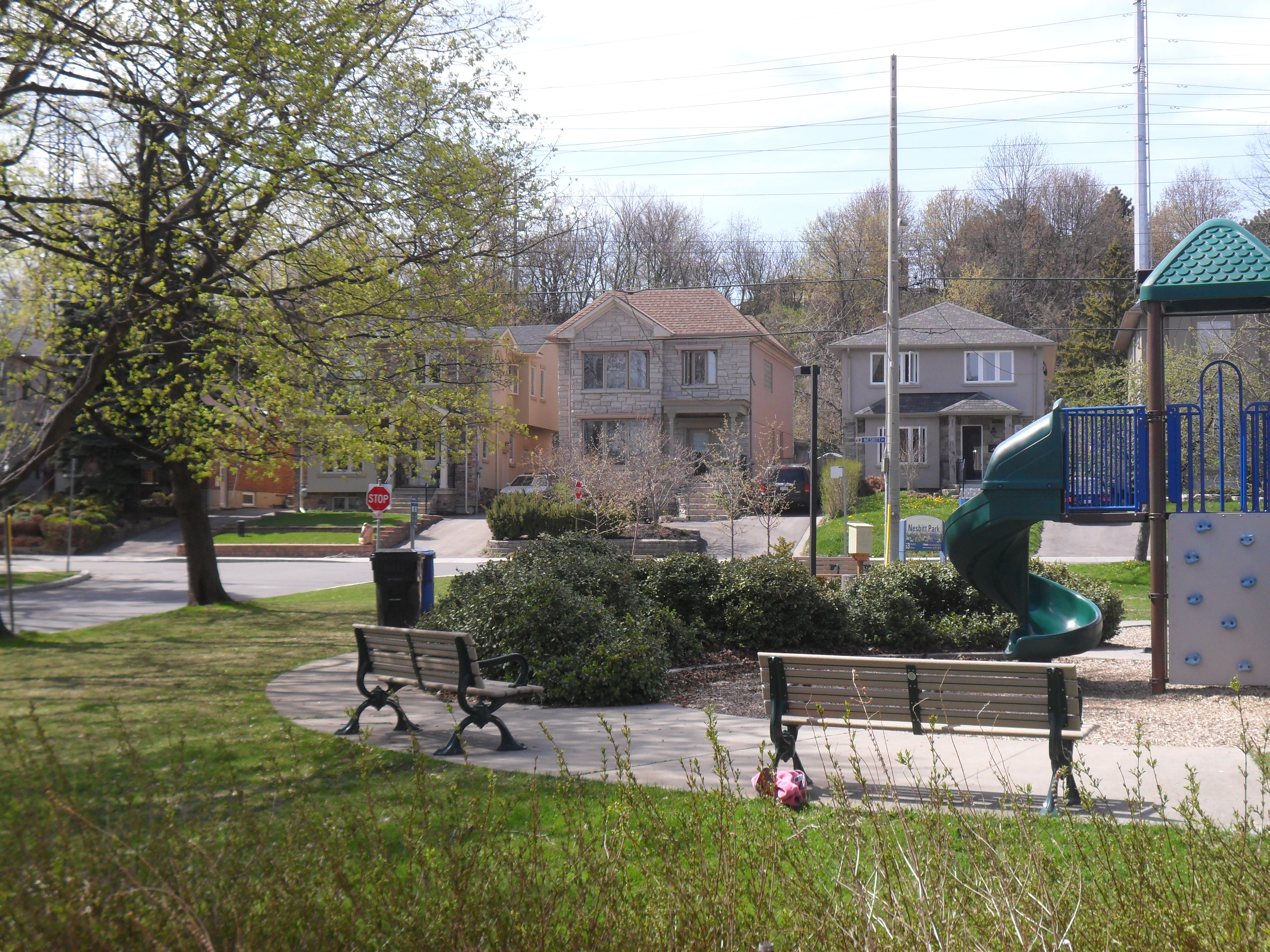
Nesbitt Park and adjacent homes in the western section

== Eastern section and the "Bayview Ghost" ==
The eastern part of the neighbourhood, across the rail line, has a very different history. After the Second World War Bayview Avenue was extended south from Moore Avenue through the Don Valley. This opened the possibility of developing the land just east of Governor's Bridge, which could be reached along Bayview. In 1959 Harry Frimerman, a Toronto land developer obtained permission from East York reeve Jack Allen to construct a set of apartment buildings on the site. This caused immediate outrage from the residents of Governor's Bridge and beyond who had been promised the area would remain as park land. Within days the municipality reversed itself, but legally the development permit could not be revoked. The developers began construction of the Hampton Park Apartments. Unable to block the construction itself, the township refused to extend water and sewer service to the site. In 1960 the developers halted construction of the partially completed apartments when the municipality refused right-of-way to the site. A hollow seven story shell of a building remained on the site for over twenty years. The position atop the ravine and next to the Don Valley Parkway made it into a prominent landmark and it was nicknamed the Bayview Ghost.

East York rezoned the area for single family homes and the "Ghost" was finally demolished in November 1981 at the developer's expense.

A new bridge was built linking Governor's Bridge to the other side of the tracks, and in the late 1990s the Conservatory Group began work on a new subdivision named the Governor's Bridge Estates. The development consists of 60 homes in a neo-eclectic style. This development also ran into difficulties as people proved unwilling to buy homes overlooking an expressway at Rosedale prices.
