= Kay Macpherson =

Canadian feminist

- Born: Kathleen Margaret Walker; 1913; Uxbridge, England, UK
- Died: August 19, 1999 (aged 85–86); Toronto, Ontario, Canada
- Occupation: Political Activist
- Organization(s): Canadian Voice of Women for Peace, National Action Committee on the Status of Women, Women for Political Action
- Spouse: CB Macpherson (m. 1943)
- Honours: Order of Canada, member

Kathleen Margaret Macpherson née Walker (1913 – 19 August 1999) was a Canadian feminist known for her views on nuclear disarmament, as well as being banned from the United States of America for her views.

== Early life ==
Macpherson was born in Uxbridge, England in 1913. After her father died in 1917, the family moved to Branksome. There, Macpherson's mother remarried in 1920 and the family moved to Bedford. Her mother died in 1933.

== Career ==
After completing school in 1932, she began training in physiotherapy at St. Thomas' Hospital and completed her training in 1934. She moved to Montreal, Canada in 1935 to work as a physiotherapist after working five months in Selly Oak. Her activism began in the 1950s with her work with the Association of Women Electors in Toronto. In 1960, Macpherson was a founding member of the Canadian Voice of Women for Peace, serving as president for a number of years. On behalf of the organization, she took a trip to Hanoi to voice opposition to the Vietnam War and arranged for Vietnamese women to visit Canada. In the late 1960s, she was consulted by the Royal Commission on the Status of Women. In 1971, Macpherson was one of the founding members of the National Action Committee on the Status of Women; she also served as president from 1977 to 1979. She was also one of the founders of Women for Political Action. She unsuccessfully ran for election with the NDP in the York East federal elections in 1972, 1974 and 1980. In 1982, Macpherson was named a member of the Order of Canada. Her writings have appeared in publications including Canadian Forum, Canadian Women Studies, and Chatelaine.

== Personal life ==
In 1941, Macpherson moved to Fredericton, New Brunswick and met political scientist C.B. Macpherson the following year while he was teaching at the University of New Brunswick. In 1943, they married and later had three children, Susan, Stephen, and Shiela. They later settled in Toronto.

She published a memoir in 1994 age the age of 80, titled When in Doubt, Do Both: The Times of My Life.

== Death ==
Macpherson died on 19 August 1999 in Toronto after suffering from cancer.
