= York South (federal electoral district) =

Former federal electoral district in Ontario, Canada

Ontario electoral district

Defunct federal electoral district
- Legislature: House of Commons
- District created: 1903
- District abolished: 1966
- First contested: 1904
- Last contested: 1965

York South was an electoral district (or "riding") in Ontario, Canada, that was represented in the House of Commons of Canada from 1904 to 1979.

The riding is notable for the 1942 federal by-election in which newly elected Conservative leader Arthur Meighen was defeated in his attempt to win a seat in the House of Commons by the Co-operative Commonwealth Federation's (CCF) candidate (assisted by the Liberals). The election was a major breakthrough for the CCF, and ended Meighen's attempt to return to politics. In later years, it became known as perennial leaders' riding, the home district for both CCF and New Democratic Party (NDP) leaders Ted Jolliffe, Donald C. MacDonald, David Lewis and Bob Rae.

== History ==
York South was created in 1903 as "the south riding of York" from parts of York East and York West ridings. It initially consisted of the township of York, and the towns of East Toronto, North Toronto, and Toronto Junction. As is suggested by the names of the towns in the riding, the constituency abutted on the city of Toronto's northern border.

In 1914, it was called "South York", and redefined to consist of the villages of Richmond Hill and Markham, the township of Markham, the town of Leaside, and the township of York (excluding parts included in the riding of West York); and those portions of the city of Toronto not included in the ridings of West York, Parkdale, North Toronto, East Toronto, Centre Toronto, West Toronto, South Toronto and East York. In 1924, it was called "York South", and consisted of all that part of the county of York lying east of Yonge Street, south of the township of Markham and outside the city of Toronto.

In 1933, York South was defined to consist of all that portion of the township of York not included in the electoral district of West York, the town of Weston and the village of Forest Hill. From 1947, it consisted of the village of Forest Hill and a portion of the township of York. In 1952, it consisted the village of Forest Hill and a re-defined portion of the township of York.

As time progressed and the population grew, the riding shrank in size so that it consisted of what was later called the Borough of York in the middle western part of Metropolitan Toronto and some surrounding areas. While it was originally a largely rural riding it was an urban, working class riding by the end of World War II.

The electoral district was abolished in 1976 when the main part of the riding became York South—Weston, and other parts were redistributed between Davenport, Eglinton—Lawrence and St. Paul's ridings.

== Members of Parliament ==
This riding elected the following members of the House of Commons of Canada:

| Parliament | Years | Member | Party |
|---|---|---|---|
Riding created from York East and York West
| 10th | 1904–1908 | William Findlay Maclean | Independent Conservative |
| 11th | 1908–1911 | William Findlay Maclean | Independent Conservative |
| 12th | 1911–1917 | William Findlay Maclean | Independent Conservative |
| 13th | 1917–1921 | William Findlay Maclean | Government (Unionist) |
| 14th | 1921–1925 | William Findlay Maclean | Independent Conservative |
| 15th | 1925–1926 | William Findlay Maclean | Independent Conservative |
| 16th | 1926–1930 | Robert Henry McGregor | Conservative |
| 17th | 1930–1935 | Robert Henry McGregor | Conservative |
| 18th | 1935–1940 | Earl Lawson | Conservative |
| 19th | 1940–1942 | Alan Cockeram | National Government |
| 19th | 1942–1945 | Joseph W. Noseworthy | Co-operative Commonwealth |
| 20th | 1945–1949 | Alan Cockeram | Progressive Conservative |
| 21st | 1949–1953 | Joseph W. Noseworthy | Co-operative Commonwealth |
| 22nd | 1953–1956† | Joseph W. Noseworthy | Co-operative Commonwealth |
| 23rd | 1957–1958 | William George Beech | Progressive Conservative |
| 24th | 1958–1962 | William George Beech | Progressive Conservative |
| 25th | 1962–1963 | David Lewis | New Democratic |
| 26th | 1963–1965 | Marvin Gelber | Liberal |
| 27th | 1965–1968 | David Lewis | New Democratic |
| 28th | 1968–1972 | David Lewis | New Democratic |
| 29th | 1972–1974 | David Lewis | New Democratic |
| 30th | 1974–1979 | Ursula Appolloni | Liberal |
Riding dissolved into York South—Weston, St. Paul's, Davenport and Eglinton—Lawrence

== Election results ==
=== South riding of York ===
1904 Canadian federal election
| Party | Candidate | Votes |
|---|---|---|
| Independent Conservative | William Findlay Maclean | 2,418 |
| Unknown | Alexander J. Anderson | 1,790 |

1908 Canadian federal election
| Party | Candidate | Votes |
|---|---|---|
| Independent Conservative | William Findlay Maclean | acclaimed |

1911 Canadian federal election
| Party | Candidate | Votes |
|---|---|---|
| Independent Conservative | William Findlay Maclean | 7,194 |
| Unknown | Louis Franklin Heyd | 1,901 |

=== South York ===
1917 Canadian federal election
| Party | Candidate | Votes |
|---|---|---|
| Government (Unionist) | William Findlay Maclean | 16,088 |
| Opposition (Laurier Liberals) | Alexander MacGregor | 2,065 |
| Labour | James Thomas Gunn | 1,977 |
| Unknown | John Galbraith | 118 |

1921 Canadian federal election
| Party | Candidate | Votes |
|---|---|---|
| Independent Conservative | William Findlay Maclean | 10,368 |
| Liberal | Alexander MacGregor | 8,015 |
| Progressive | Roland Hill Palmer | 3,276 |

=== York South ===
1925 Canadian federal election
| Party | Candidate | Votes |
|---|---|---|
| Independent Conservative | William Findlay MacLean | 7,762 |
| Liberal | Russell James Reesor | 1,394 |
| Independent Conservative | John Galbraith | 990 |

1926 Canadian federal election
| Party | Candidate | Votes |
|---|---|---|
| Conservative | Robert Henry McGregor | 6,555 |
| Independent Conservative | William Findlay MacLean | 4,880 |

1930 Canadian federal election
| Party | Candidate | Votes |
|---|---|---|
| Conservative | Robert Henry McGregor | 11,852 |
| Liberal | Dennis McCarthy | 5,394 |

1935 Canadian federal election
| Party | Candidate | Votes |
|---|---|---|
| Conservative | Earl Lawson | 11,596 |
| Co-operative Commonwealth | Luke Teskey | 8,247 |
| Liberal | Elmore Philpott | 7,059 |
| Reconstruction | Earl M. Hand | 4,113 |

1940 Canadian federal election
| Party | Candidate | Votes |
|---|---|---|
| National Government | Alan Cockeram | 15,346 |
| Liberal | F. J. MacRae | 12,864 |
| Co-operative Commonwealth | Joseph W. Noseworthy | 5,372 |

By-election: On Mr. Cockeram's resignation to allow Arthur Meighen to contest the seat:

By-election on 9 February 1942
| Party | Candidate | Votes |
| Co-operative Commonwealth | Joseph W. Noseworthy | 16,408 |
| Conservative | Arthur Meighen | 11,952 |

1945 Canadian federal election
| Party | Candidate | Votes |
|---|---|---|
| Progressive Conservative | Alan Cockeram | 16,666 |
| Co-operative Commonwealth | Joseph W. Noseworthy | 13,543 |
| Liberal | John Harvey Lynes | 9,104 |
| Labor–Progressive | Walter E. Dent | 1,089 |

1949 Canadian federal election
| Party | Candidate | Votes |
|---|---|---|
| Co-operative Commonwealth | Joseph W. Noseworthy | 15,293 |
| Progressive Conservative | Alan Cockeram | 14,273 |
| Liberal | Eric R. Marsden | 11,932 |

1953 Canadian federal election
| Party | Candidate | Votes |
|---|---|---|
| Co-operative Commonwealth | Joseph W. Noseworthy | 12,216 |
| Liberal | Alfred Green | 10,820 |
| Progressive Conservative | Alan Cockeram | 10,116 |
| Labor–Progressive | Norman Penner | 755 |

1957 Canadian federal election
| Party | Candidate | Votes |
|---|---|---|
| Progressive Conservative | William George Beech | 16,624 |
| Liberal | Marvin Gelber | 12,232 |
| Co-operative Commonwealth | William Sefton | 12,024 |
| Social Credit | Sloan A. Smith | 654 |

1958 Canadian federal election
| Party | Candidate | Votes |
|---|---|---|
| Progressive Conservative | William George Beech | 22,980 |
| Liberal | Marvin Gelber | 13,141 |
| Co-operative Commonwealth | Bill Sefton | 9,643 |
| Labor–Progressive | Leslie Morris | 427 |
| Social Credit | Harvey Jamieson | 258 |

1962 Canadian federal election
| Party | Candidate | Votes |
|---|---|---|
| New Democratic | David Lewis | 19,101 |
| Liberal | Marvin Gelber | 15,423 |
| Progressive Conservative | William George Beech | 12,552 |
| Social Credit | Reinald Nochakoff | 179 |

1963 Canadian federal election
| Party | Candidate | Votes |
|---|---|---|
| Liberal | Marvin Gelber | 21,042 |
| New Democratic | David Lewis | 17,396 |
| Progressive Conservative | William George Beech | 9,648 |

1965 Canadian federal election
| Party | Candidate | Votes |
|---|---|---|
| New Democratic | David Lewis | 21,693 |
| Liberal | Marvin Gelber | 18,098 |
| Progressive Conservative | Maxwell Rotstein | 6,427 |

1968 Canadian federal election
| Party | Candidate | Votes |
|---|---|---|
| New Democratic | David Lewis | 12,357 |
| Liberal | Ron Barbaro | 11,693 |
| Progressive Conservative | Cy Townsend | 4,499 |

1972 Canadian federal election
| Party | Candidate | Votes |
|---|---|---|
| New Democratic | David Lewis | 14,225 |
| Liberal | Lucio Appolloni | 9,551 |
| Progressive Conservative | John Oostrom | 6,401 |
| Unknown | Keith Corkhill | 172 |

1974 Canadian federal election
| Party | Candidate | Votes | % |
|---|---|---|---|
| Liberal | Ursula Appolloni | 12,485 | 43.10 |
| New Democratic | David Lewis | 10,622 | 36.67 |
| Progressive Conservative | Paul J. Schrieder | 5,557 | 19.18 |
| Independent | Richard Sanders | 103 | 0.04 |
| Marxist–Leninist | Keith Corkhill | 102 | 0.04 |
| Independent | Robert Douglas Sproule | 97 | 0.03 |

== See also ==
- List of Canadian electoral districts
- Historical federal electoral districts of Canada
