= York East (federal electoral district) =

Former federal electoral district in Ontario, Canada

Ontario electoral district
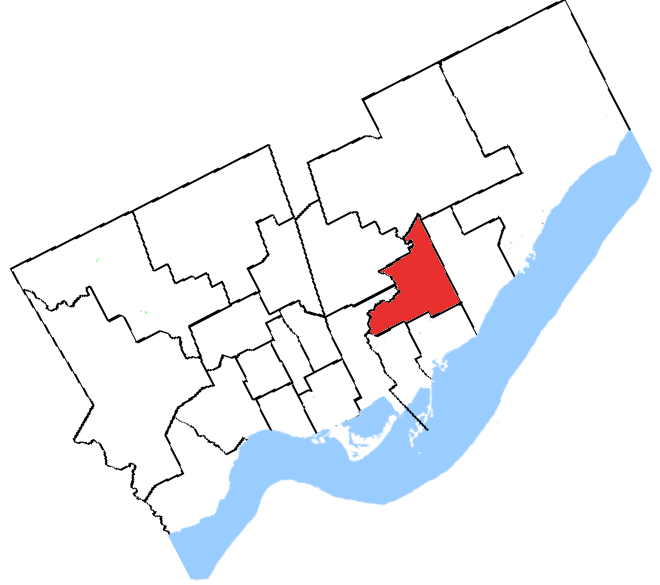
- York East's boundaries in place from 1966 to 1976

Defunct federal electoral district
- Legislature: House of Commons
- District created: 1867
- District abolished: 1988
- First contested: 1867
- Last contested: 1984

Demographics
- Census division: Toronto
- Census subdivision: Toronto

York East was a federal electoral district represented in the House of Commons of Canada at different times. It was located in the province of Ontario.

== History ==
The first federal riding of York East was created by the British North America Act 1867. Called the East Riding of York, it consisted of the Townships of Markham, Scarborough, the Village of Yorkville and the portion of the Township of York lying east of Yonge Street. In 1882, it was redefined to consist of the townships of East York, Scarborough and Markham, and the villages of Yorkville and Markham.

The electoral district was abolished in 1903 when it was redistributed between Toronto East, Toronto North, York Centre and York South ridings.

In 1914, the East Riding of York was recreated out of York Centre and York South ridings, and was defined as consisting of the township of Scarboro, and the eastern portion of the city of Toronto south of Danforth Avenue and east of Pape Avenue. The electoral district was abolished in 1924 when it was redistributed between Toronto—Scarborough and York South ridings.

In 1933, the riding of York East was created from parts of York North and York South ridings, and was defined as consisting of the part of the county of York lying south of the township of Whitchurch, east of Yonge Street, and north of the city of Toronto, and including the village of Stouffville.

In 1947, it was redefined to consist of the part of the county of York lying south of the township of Markham, east of Yonge Street and north of the city of Toronto. In 1952, it was redefined to consist of the township of East York and the part of North York township bounded south of Lawrence Avenue and east of the town of Leaside and Leslie Street.

In 1966 and 1976, it was redefined with reference to various streets and rivers in Metropolitan Toronto. The electoral district was abolished in 1987 when it was redistributed between Beaches—Woodbine, Broadview—Greenwood, Don Valley West and Don Valley East ridings.

== Members of Parliament ==
This riding has elected the following members of Parliament:

Parliament	Years	Member	Party
East Riding of York
1st	1867–1872	James Metcalfe	Liberal
2nd	1872–1874	James Metcalfe	Liberal
3rd	1874–1878	James Metcalfe	Liberal
4th	1878–1882	Alfred Boultbee	Conservative
5th	1882–1887	Alexander Mackenzie	Liberal
6th	1887–1891	Alexander Mackenzie	Liberal
7th	1891–1892†	Alexander Mackenzie	Liberal
7th	1892–1896	William Findlay Maclean	Independent Conservative
8th	1896–1900	William Findlay Maclean	Independent Conservative
9th	1900–1904	William Findlay Maclean	Independent Conservative
Riding dissolved into Toronto East, Toronto North, York Centre and York South
East Riding of York; Riding re-created from York Centre and York South
13th	1917–1921	Thomas Foster	Government (Unionist)
14th	1921–1925	Joseph Henry Harris	Conservative
Riding dissolved into Toronto—Scarborough and York South
York East; Riding created from York North and York South
18th	1935–1940	Robert Henry McGregor	Conservative
19th	1940–1945	Robert Henry McGregor	National Government
20th	1945–1949	Robert Henry McGregor	Progressive Conservative
21st	1949–1953	Robert Henry McGregor	Progressive Conservative
22nd	1953–1957	Robert Henry McGregor	Progressive Conservative
23rd	1957–1958	Robert Henry McGregor	Progressive Conservative
24th	1958–1962	Robert Henry McGregor	Progressive Conservative
25th	1962–1963	Steve Otto	Liberal
26th	1963–1965	Steve Otto	Liberal
27th	1965–1968	Steve Otto	Liberal
28th	1968–1972	Steve Otto	Liberal
29th	1972–1974	Ian MacLachlan Arrol	Progressive Conservative
30th	1974–1979	David Collenette	Liberal
31st	1979–1980	Ron Ritchie	Progressive Conservative
32nd	1980–1984	David Collenette	Liberal
33rd	1984–1988	Alan Redway	Progressive Conservative
Riding dissolved into Beaches—Woodbine, Broadview—Greenwood, Don Valley West and Don Valley East

== Election results ==
=== East Riding of York, 1867–1904 ===
1867 Canadian federal election
Party	Candidate	Votes
Liberal	James Metcalfe	1,174
Unknown	T. A. Milne	937
Eligible voters		2,863
Source: Canadian Parliamentary Guide, 1871

1872 Canadian federal election
Party	Candidate	Votes
Liberal	James Metcalfe	acc.
Source: Canadian Elections Database

1874 Canadian federal election
Party	Candidate	Votes
Liberal	James Metcalfe	acc.
lop.parl.ca

1878 Canadian federal election
Party	Candidate	Votes
Conservative	Alfred Boultbee	1,526
Liberal	James Metcalfe	1,460

1882 Canadian federal election
Party	Candidate	Votes
Liberal	Alexander Mackenzie	1,857
Conservative	Alfred Boultbee	1,749

1887 Canadian federal election
Party	Candidate	Votes
Liberal	Alexander Mackenzie	2,552
Conservative	Alfred Boultbee	2,391

1891 Canadian federal election
Party	Candidate	Votes
Liberal	Alexander Mackenzie	3,003
Independent Conservative	William Findlay Maclean	2,977

May 11, 1892 by-election on Mackenzie's death
Party	Candidate	Votes
Independent Conservative	William Findlay Maclean	acc.

1896 Canadian federal election
Party	Candidate	Votes
Independent Conservative	William Findlay Maclean	3,907
Liberal	Henry R. Frankland	3,904

1900 Canadian federal election
Party	Candidate	Votes
Independent Conservative	William Findlay Maclean	4,131
Liberal	N.W. Rowell	3,489

=== York East, 1917–1925 ===
1917 Canadian federal election
Party	Candidate	Votes
Government	Thomas Foster	9,736
Opposition	Ross Collier Cockburn	5,758
Labour	James Hamilton Ballantyne	3,338

1921 Canadian federal election
Party	Candidate	Votes
Conservative	Joseph Henry Harris	10,978
Liberal	Austin Gregory Ross	4,440
Labour	Harry Kirwin	3,074

=== York East, 1935–1988 ===
1935 Canadian federal election
Party	Candidate	Votes
Conservative	Robert Henry McGregor	11,634
Liberal	Goldie Fleming	8,922
Co-operative Commonwealth	Arthur Henry Williams	7,864
Reconstruction	John Warren	4,054
Independent Liberal	Denis McCarthy	975

1940 Canadian federal election
Party	Candidate	Votes
National Government	Robert Henry McGregor	16,741
Liberal	Robert Allan Irwin	12,429
Co-operative Commonwealth	Edward Bigelow (Ted) Jolliffe	4,931

1945 Canadian federal election
Party	Candidate	Votes
Progressive Conservative	Robert Henry McGregor	19,908
Liberal	Donald Robert Morrison	14,036
Co-operative Commonwealth	Frederick C. Madill	8,654
Labor–Progressive	John Francis White	465
Social Credit	Carl Clark Pinkney	355

1949 Canadian federal election
Party	Candidate	Votes
Progressive Conservative	Robert Henry McGregor	22,364
Liberal	Walter Melville Martin	21,398
Co-operative Commonwealth	Frederick C. Madill	13,448

1953 Canadian federal election
Party	Candidate	Votes
Progressive Conservative	Robert Henry McGregor	11,062
Liberal	Joseph Douglas Thomas	8,701
Co-operative Commonwealth	True Davidson	5,815
Labor–Progressive	Margery Ferguson	472

1957 Canadian federal election
Party	Candidate	Votes
Progressive Conservative	Robert Henry McGregor	17,236
Liberal	Ray S. Tower	9,078
Co-operative Commonwealth	Sid Dunkley	6,725
Social Credit	Henry F. Motton	620

1958 Canadian federal election
Party	Candidate	Votes
Progressive Conservative	Robert Henry McGregor	22,900
Liberal	Ray. S. Tower	8,317
Co-operative Commonwealth	Sid Dunkley	6,033

1962 Canadian federal election
Party	Candidate	Votes
Liberal	Steve Otto	16,963
Progressive Conservative	Robert Henry McGregor	16,827
New Democratic Party	Sid Dunkley	10,940
Social Credit	Norman Elston	609

1963 Canadian federal election
Party	Candidate	Votes
Liberal	Steve Otto	21,038
Progressive Conservative	Willis Blair	14,777
New Democratic Party	Sid Dunkley	11,234
Social Credit	James Mackie	349

1965 Canadian federal election
Party	Candidate	Votes
Liberal	Steve Otto	18,840
Progressive Conservative	William Whipper Watson	15,312
New Democratic Party	William Smith	13,045
Social Credit	R. Beacock	194

1968 Canadian federal election
Party	Candidate	Votes
Liberal	Steve Otto	19,320
Progressive Conservative	Kechin Wang	12,155
New Democratic Party	Eamon Park	11,921

1972 Canadian federal election
Party	Candidate	Votes
Progressive Conservative	Ian MacLachlan Arrol	18,729
Liberal	Steve Otto	18,039
New Democratic Party	W. Thomas Beckett	10,876
No affiliation	Janina Klee	113
No affiliation	Harold Rowbottom	104

1974 Canadian federal election
Party	Candidate	Votes
Liberal	David Collenette	20,682
Progressive Conservative	Ian MacLachlan Arrol	17,593
New Democratic Party	Kay MacPherson	9,818
Marxist–Leninist	John Dennis	150
Communist	Dan Hammond	128
Independent	Paul M. Miniato	121

1979 Canadian federal election
Party	Candidate	Votes
Progressive Conservative	Ron Ritchie	20,372
Liberal	David Collenette	19,091
New Democratic Party	Kay MacPherson	8,651
Libertarian	Paul M. Miniato	193
Social Credit	Michael J. Marzolini	125
Communist	Stamatis Togias	92
Marxist–Leninist	Jeanne Gatley	78

1980 Canadian federal election
Party	Candidate	Votes
Liberal	David Collenette	20,580
Progressive Conservative	Ron Ritchie	16,672
New Democratic Party	Kay MacPherson	7,997
Libertarian	David Anderson	352
Rhinoceros	John Matheson	237
Marxist–Leninist	Jeanne Gatley	49
lop.parl.ca

1984 Canadian federal election
Party	Candidate	Votes
Progressive Conservative	Alan Redway	21,978
Liberal	David Collenette	16,519
New Democratic Party	Bill Gorelle	7,581
Libertarian	Chris Sorensen	243
Communist	Stathis Stathpoulos	171

== See also ==
- List of Canadian electoral districts
- Historical federal electoral districts of Canada
