= Kingston Road (Toronto) =

Road in Toronto and Durham, Ontario, Canada

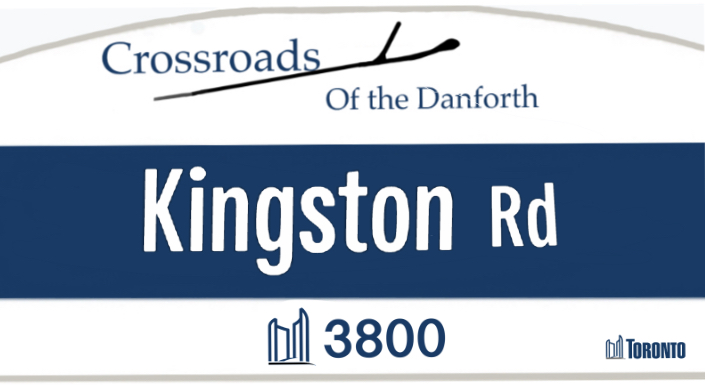
- Durham Regional Highway 2
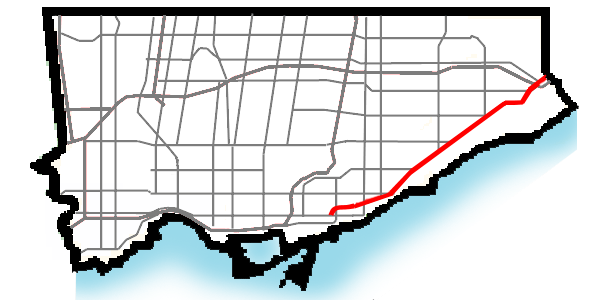
- Kingston Rd. within Toronto
- Maintained by: City of Toronto Transportation Services; Region of Durham
- Length: 36.3 km (22.6 mi)
- Location: Toronto; Pickering; Ajax
- West end: Queen Street (Continues as Eastern Avenue)
- Major junctions: Woodbine Avenue; Danforth Avenue; St. Clair Avenue; McCowan Road; Markham Road; Eglinton Avenue; Lawrence Avenue; Morningside Avenue; Highway 2A; Highway 401; Sheppard Avenue/Port Union Road; Whites Road; Liverpool Road; Brock Road; Westney Road; Harwood Avenue
- East end: Lake Ridge Road (Continues as Dundas Street into Whitby)

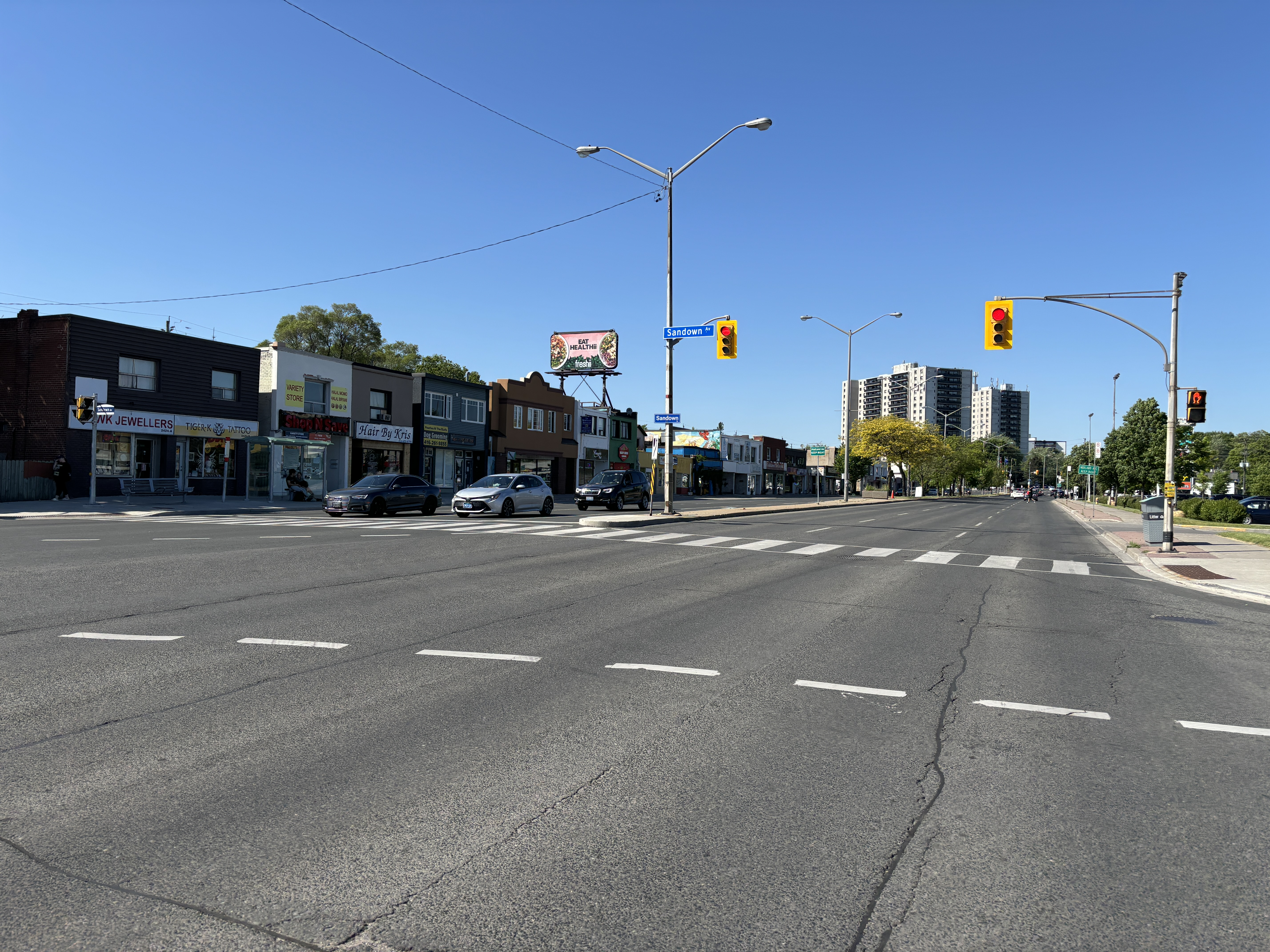
Kingston Road at Sandown Avenue in 2024

Kingston Road is a major historic arterial road in Toronto and Durham Region, Ontario. It is the southernmost major (mainly) east–west road in the eastern portion of Toronto, specifically in the district of Scarborough, and runs east to Ajax in Durham. Due to its diagonal course near the shore of Lake Ontario, the street is the terminus of many arterial roads in eastern Toronto, both east–west and north-south, with a few continuing for a short distance after as minor residential streets. However Lawrence Avenue continues as a major arterial for a considerable distance beyond it.

Until 1998, it formed a portion of Highway 2. The name of the street is derived from Kingston, Ontario as the road was the primary route used to travel from Toronto to the settlements east of it situated along the shores of Lake Ontario; in the west end of Kingston, the road was referred to as the York Road (referring to Toronto) until at least 1908, and is today named Princess Street.

== Route description ==
Until Highway 401 was constructed, Kingston Road was the principal route from Toronto to points east. Accordingly, it became the site of numerous inns and motels, many of which still dot the road, particularly in Scarborough. Now some of these inns are being demolished to make way for townhouse developments. Kingston Road is a six-lane principal arterial road through most of Scarborough aside from a brief two-lane segment between Lawson Road and Highway 401, narrowing from six to four lanes as it crosses into Durham. It has a 60 km/h (37 mph) speed limit for the most part.

The southwesternmost section in the Beaches area is a traditional urban street with storefronts, high pedestrian traffic, and streetcars. The speed limit in that section is 50 km/h (31 mph).

The Toronto section runs from Queen Street East, as a continuation of Eastern Avenue, just west of Woodbine Avenue (route to Lake Shore Boulevard, the westerly continuation of former Highway 2), through Scarborough to Toronto's eastern city limits with Durham Region, where it continues into Pickering and Ajax (as Durham Regional Highway 2), and officially ends where its name changes to Dundas Street in Whitby, at Lake Ridge Road (Durham Regional Road 23), just west of Highway 412.

To preserve the historic village of West Hill, Kingston Road was realigned near the Highland Creek, east of Morningside Avenue. The bypassed original alignment was renamed Old Kingston Road. Other former parallel sections, also called Old Kingston Road, exist in Ajax and Courtice, although Kingston Road proper does not reach Courtice today. There is also an old section of the old Danforth Road in Grafton.

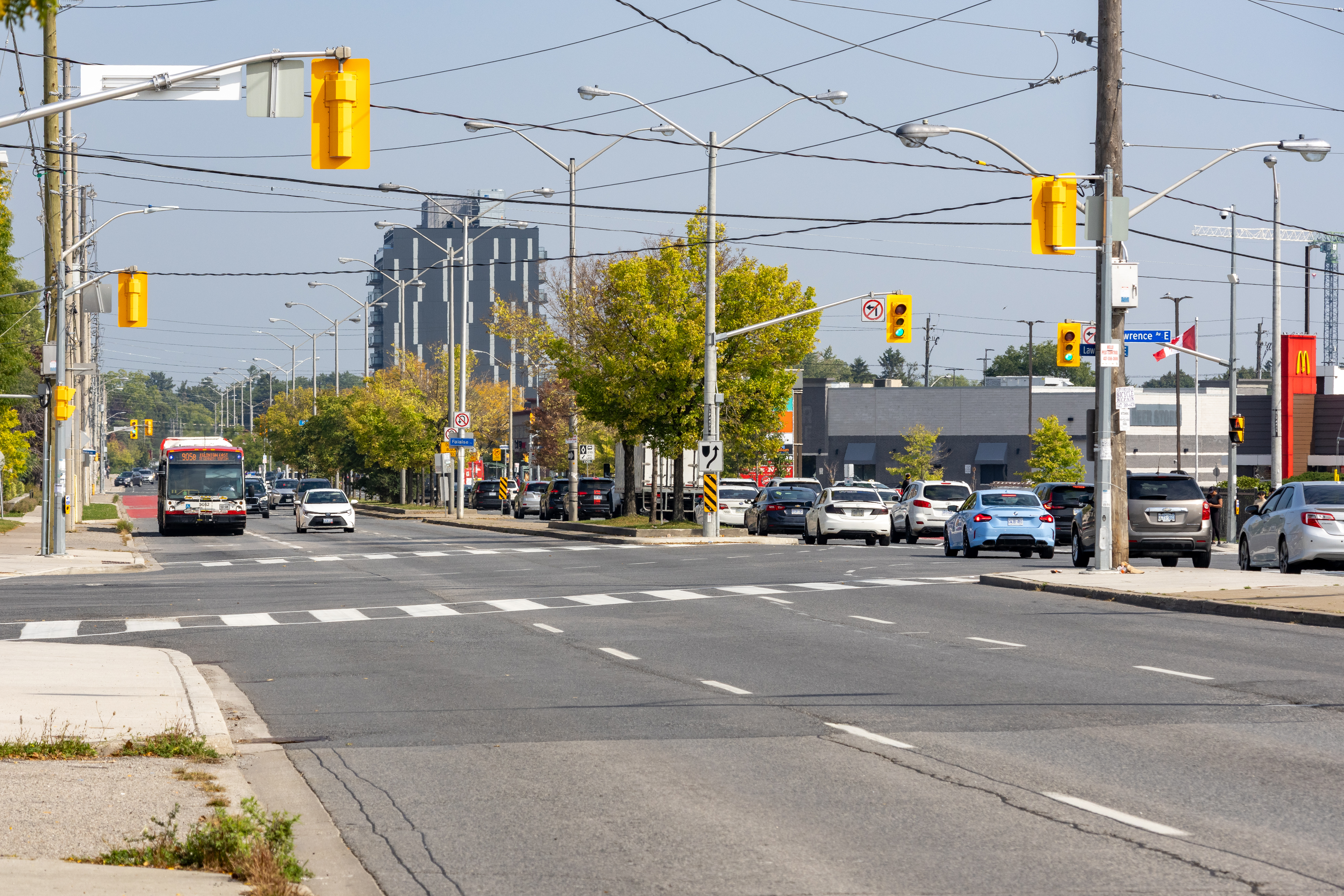
Kingston Road at Lawrence Avenue in West Hill

Kingston Road has six lanes west of the interchange with Lawson Road as well as east of Highway 401, however there is a discontinuity and a large reduction in capacity to two lanes as Kingston Road reverts to the original alignment (as well as reuniting with Old Kingston Road) at an off-ramp at the Lawson Road interchange, since mainline traffic is instead defaulted onto Highway 2A. Highway 2A was originally constructed in 1947 as a precursor to Toronto Bypass, which was inaugurated in 1952 as Highway 401 that incorporated most of Highway 2A between Toronto to Newcastle as well as being extended westwards along a more northerly alignment. To facilitate traffic to and from Highway 401, the remaining section of Highway 2A (reduced to a spur route in 1952) was retained as the direct continuation of Kingston Road east of the Lawson Road exit. The eastern terminus of Highway 2A also has an off-ramp to Port Union Road which in turn intersects Kingston Road's six-lane segment east of Highway 401, plus Kingston Road (before narrowing from six to two lanes, just west of Highway 401) has an on-ramp to Highway 2A westbound. With Highway 2A effectively acting as an express connector between Kingston Road's two six-lane sections, Kingston Road's two lane segment was never widened and reconnected as a through street.

== History ==
Kingston Road traces its history back to the eastward extension of The Governor's Road from Toronto (then called York) with the mouth of the Trent River. American engineer Asa Danforth Jr. was contracted to build the road in 1799 at a cost of $90.00 per mile. Danforth was tasked with clearing a 10-metre (33 ft) wide road with 5 metres (16 ft), preferably in the centre, cut to the ground which was carved as far as Port Hope by December, and to the Trent River soon after. The road, known as The Scarborough Front Road, was completed by December 18, 1800, but was poorly maintained thereafter.

In 1815 the Kingston Road was surveyed and it followed the line, in many cases, of the former road laid out by Asa Danforth as far as the Trent River. Beyond that point, the two historic roads diverge, with Danforth's road taking a more southern route to reach the Bay of Quinte. The work was completed by 1817 and the road renamed The Kingston Road.

The road no longer bears the name "Kingston Road" anywhere east of Ajax, and thus has effectively been dramatically shortened from its original length. This is in contrast to other long-distance historic "streets" such as Dundas Street, which runs from Toronto to London and still carries that name in the latter city and in many points in between.

== Public transit ==
=== History ===
==== Kingston Road Tramway ====
From 1875 to 1887 Kingston Road Tramway ran horsecars from Don River (Don Bridge - now Old Eastern Avenue Bridge) to Main Street (moved further east to Blantyre Avenue in 1878 to serve Scarboro' Heights Hotel). The single track route had three major stops (Don Bridge, Woodbine, Ben Lamond Hotel at Main Street and Scarboro Heights Hotel at Blantyre Avenue) running 12 times daily and 13 on Saturday in summer. The route ceased operation in 1887.

==== Toronto and Scarboro' Electric Railway, Light and Power Company ====
The Toronto and Scarboro' Electric Railway, Light and Power Company inaugurated a single-track radial service along Kingston Road from Queen Street as far as Blantyre Avenue, just east of Victoria Park Avenue, in 1893. The line was extended in stages, reaching its furthest extent east of Morningside Avenue in West Hill in 1906. The TTC assumed tracks on the line in 1922 and converted service as far as the newly constructed Bingham Loop (Victoria Park) to double-track city streetcars by the end of the year, and to Birchmount Loop in 1928, with radial service continuing in each case beyond. Radial service was closed east of Eglinton Avenue, replaced by buses, in 1930, and all radial service ceased in favour of buses in 1936. TTC streetcar service was truncated at Bingham Loop in 1954, leaving the service as outlined in the following section.

==== 114 Kingston Road bus ====
From 1980 to 1990, with the opening of Kennedy station, the 114 Kingston Road East bus route served Kingston Road running from Warden Station to Markham Road with another branch running to Lawrence Avenue and Beechgrove Drive. It was replaced by the 12 Kingston road and 102 Markham road.

==== Bus lanes ====
Bus lanes have been proposed to run along Kingston Road from Ellesmere Road to the east end of Kingston Road since 2007 as a part of the Durham–Scarborough bus rapid transit. By 2015, Durham Region had installed reserved bus and bicycle lanes on Kingston Road between Harwood Avenue and Salem Road in Ajax. These curb-side lanes were delineated by painted markings on the road surface and diamond signs over the lanes.

As a part of Toronto's RapidTo project bus lanes were install from Eglinton to Morningside in 2020.

=== Present-day ===
In Toronto, west of Victoria Park, the street is served by the Toronto Transit Commission (TTC), which operates a streetcar service (503 Kingston Rd) route. East of Victoria Park Avenue, the main route is the 12 Kingston being the main service until Brimley, with the 12D operating during some periods east to Morningside while service is supplemented by routes 69 and 117. The 102 and 86 operate for the majority of where 12D operates all day, and the 86 continues east of Morningside to Meadowvale. In Durham, Kingston Road is served by Durham Region Transit's (DRT) Pulse bus rapid transit and GO Transit, which both operate routes, originating in Toronto, with duplicate routing (although routing and termini are separate within Toronto) along it.

The routes that primarily serve the street are:

Toronto (TTC):

Route		Direction and Termini			
503	Kingston Rd	WB	To Spadina Avenue via King Street	EB	To Victoria Park Avenue (Bingham Loop)
12	Kingston Rd	WB	To Victoria Park Subway Station via Victoria Park Avenue	EB	To U of T Scarborough (D branch)(All branches serve west of Brimley)
69	Warden South	WB	To Warden Subway Station via Warden Avenue	EB	To St. Clair Avenue and Barkdene Hills
117	Birchmount South	WB	To Victoria Park Subway Station via Victoria Park Avenue	EB	To Warden Subway Station via Birchmount Road
102	Markham Rd	WB	To Warden Subway Station via St. Clair Avenue	EB	To All branches serve Kingston Rd. as far east as Markham Road before turning off then head north
86	Scarborough	WB	To Kennedy station via Eglinton Avenue	EB	Branches A and C serve Kingston Rd To; Meadowvale Road before turning off(B to Lawson and D to Lawrence)
986	Scarborough Express		To Kennedy station via Eglinton Avenue		To Meadowvale Road

Durham Region (DRT):

Route		Direction and Termini			
900	Highway 2	WB	To University of Toronto Scarborough Campus via Ellesmere Road	EB	To Mary Street in Oshawa via Dundas and King/Bond Streets

GO Transit:

Route		Direction and Termini			
92+	Oshawa/Yorkdale	WB	To Yorkdale Bus Terminal via Highway 401	EB	To Oshawa Bus Terminal (main route) via Dundas and King/Bond Streets; To Dundas St. @ Hwy 412 Park & Ride (A branch; weekday rush hours only)

== See also ==
- Highway 401
- Highway 2
- Highway 2A
