= Victoria Park Avenue =

Street in Toronto, Canada

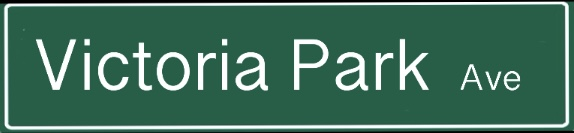

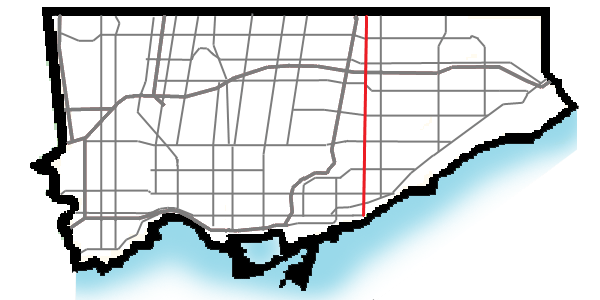
- Victoria Park Avenue within Toronto
- Maintained by: City of Toronto government, York Region
- Location: Toronto; Markham
- South end: Queen Street in Toronto
- Major junctions: Kingston Road; Gerrard Street; Danforth Avenue; St. Clair Avenue; O'Connor Drive; Eglinton Avenue; Lawrence Avenue; Parkwoods Village Drive/Ellesmere Road; Sheppard Avenue; Finch Avenue; Steeles Avenue
- North end: Denison Street in Markham

Other
Nearby arterial roads in Toronto
← Don Valley Parkway; Highway 404	Pharmacy Avenue →

Victoria Park Avenue is a major north–south route in eastern Toronto, Ontario, Canada. It is the western border of Scarborough, separating it from Old Toronto, East York, and North York. The common nickname for it is VP or Vic Park.

== History ==
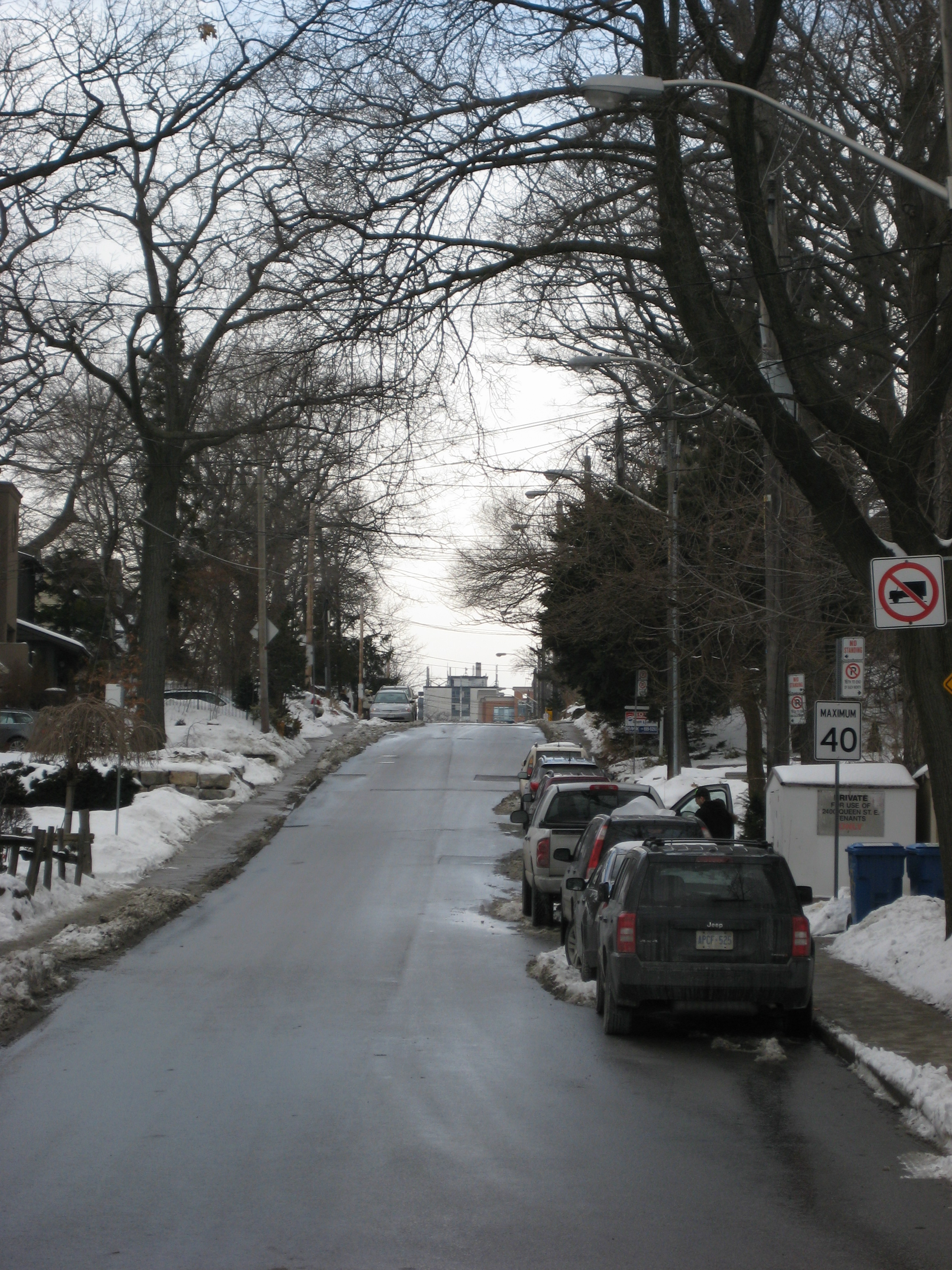
Victoria Park is a narrow residential street as it climbs the western edge of the Scarborough Bluffs in the Beaches

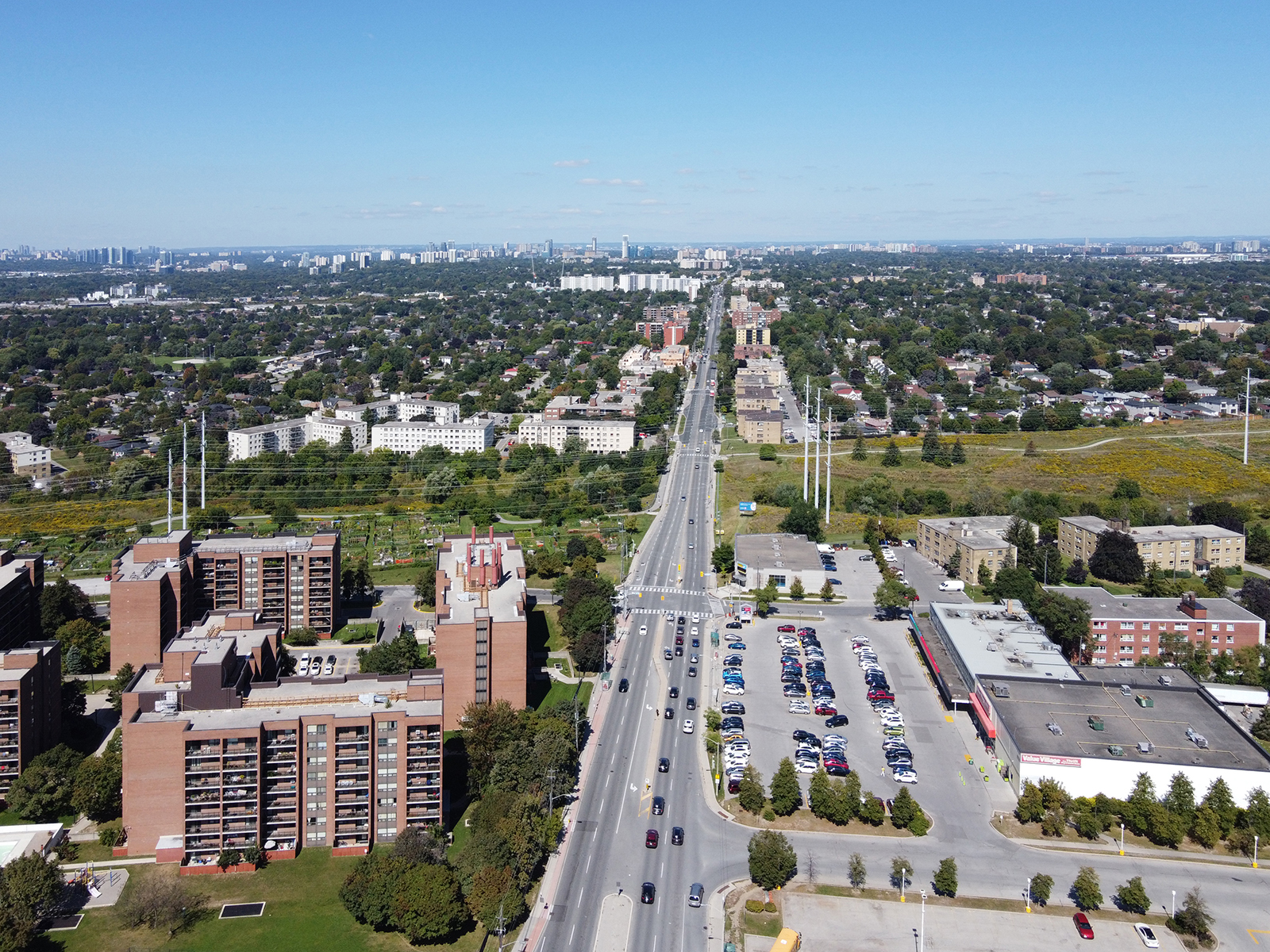
Victoria Park Avenue at Victoria Village

Victoria Park Avenue was originally a pioneer road for settlement of Scarborough. Except for its very southernmost section (south of Bracken Avenue), the road once formed the boundary for the former township, borough, and city of Scarborough with the former municipalities of East York, North York, and the former city of Toronto.

The road took its name from the Victoria Park amusement park that operated south of Queen Street from 1878 until 1906.

== Route description ==
Victoria Park Avenue begins as a two-lane residential street near Lake Ontario at Queen Street at the east end of the Beaches community. It takes a sharp jog west just before Bracken Avenue and then continues in a straight line northward.

It remains a two-lane residential street past Bracken Avenue north to Gerrard Street, albeit one with a heavy traffic load; at Gerrard Street it becomes a four-lane major arterial road. It reduces to two lanes again from a point north of Danforth Avenue to Dawes Road, then returns to four lanes for rest of its length. North of Dawes, it shifts from being a residential street to being a suburban arterial, with mostly stores and low-rise apartment buildings along the rest of its length. North of McNicoll Avenue the route is a mixed commercial and light industrial street.

Victoria Park Avenue ends a short distance north of Steeles Avenue at Denison Street in Markham, Ontario.

== Public transit ==
Victoria Park remains one of the busiest north–south streets in Scarborough, along with Markham Road and Kennedy Road. It is served by the Toronto subway at Victoria Park station.

Historically, the first bus to service the street were private routes that operated along Dawes Road, and then north along Victoria Park. This route was taken over by the TTC in 1954 and offered service as far north as Victoria Park and Lawrence. The opening of Victoria Park subway station in 1968 led to the creation of the 24 Victoria Park, replacing the Dawes Road bus on Victoria Park. It first ran to Victoria Park and Old Sheppard Avenue but has steadily been extended northwards. With the opening of Sheppard subway in 2002, the 224 Victoria Park North ran from Don Mills station into Markham. The 224 went back to the older alignment with the 24D Victoria Park branch in 2016, then was replaced by the 24 Woodbine bus operated by York Region Transit later in 2016.

Also beginning in 1968, the portion of Victoria Park south of Victoria Park station began to be served by the 12 Kingston Road bus. This bus travels south of the station until Kingston Road and then turns east along Kingston to travel into Scarborough. It stops at Bingham Loop to meet up with the termini of the 503 Kingston Rd.

== Landmarks ==
Landmark	Cross street	Notes	Image
R. C. Harris Water Treatment Plant	Queen St.	Former site of Victoria Park amusement park	
Neil McNeil Catholic Secondary School	Bracken Ave.		
Shoppers World Danforth	Danforth Ave.	Former auto plant	
Victoria Park station	Denton Ave.	Subway station on Line 2 Bloor–Danforth	
Dentonia Park	Denton Ave.	Also has a golf course which along with Crescent Town were once part of Walter Massey's Dentonia Park dairy farm that supplied milk to his City Dairy Company Limited.	
Eglinton Square Shopping Centre	Eglinton Sq.		
O'Connor stop	Eglinton Ave.	Light rail stop on Line 5 Eglinton	
Church of St. Jude (Wexford)	Sloane Ave.		
Senator O'Connor College School	Rowena Dr.		
Victoria Park Collegiate Institute	Cassandra Blvd.		
Annunciation of the Blessed Virgin Mary Roman Catholic Church	Combermere Dr.		
Parkway Mall	Ellesmere Rd.		
St. Andrew Anglican Church	Terraview Blvd.		
Johnny's Charcoal Broiled Hamburgers	Sheppard Ave.		

== See also ==
- Royal eponyms in Canada
