= List of people from East York =

The following is a list of people from East York, a former municipality in Toronto, Ontario.

== Athletes ==
- Jim Brennan, MLS player for Toronto FC
- Rob and Rich Butler, professional baseball players: outfielders
- Russell Martin, professional baseball catcher
- Glenn Smith, former NHL player for Toronto St. Patricks
- Brandon Tanev, NHL forward for Seattle Kraken
- Chris Tanev NHL defenceman for Toronto Maple Leafs
- Tamara Tatham, Basketball Player for Team Canada in Rio Olympics
- Ron Taylor, professional baseball pitcher; physician
- Whipper Billy Watson, champion wrestler

== Musicians ==
- Jesse F. Keeler, DJ and producer as MSTRKRFT; bassist and keyboardist of Death from Above 1979
- Still Life Still, indie rock group
- Domenic Troiano, former guitarist for Ronnie Hawkins, The Guess Who and Bush

== Media ==
- Will Arnett, actor
- John Candy, comedian and actor
- Shirley Douglas, actress; daughter of political leader Tommy Douglas; mother of Kiefer Sutherland
- Peter Lynch, TV director
- Raymond Massey, actor
- Joseph Motiki, actor, voice actor, and television presenter
- Colin Mochrie, actor and improvisational comedian
- Kiefer Sutherland, movie and TV actor, 24
- Nerene Virgin, journalist, actress and teacher

== Others ==
- George Armstrong (1870–1956), politician and labour activist
- Edwin Alonzo Boyd, bank robber
- Stan Butler, Ontario Hockey League coach, North Bay Battalion
- True Davidson, first mayor of East York
- Stephen Harper, Canadian Prime Minister (Leaside)
- Vincent Massey, Canadian Governor General
- Robert McClure, medical missionary
- Agnes McPhail, first woman to be elected to the House of Commons of Canada
- Tom Pashby, Canadian ophthalmologist, sport safety advocate, member of the Order of Canada
- Charles Sauriol, naturalist and author
