= Borden Buildings =

Coordinates: 43°39′37″N 79°24′00″W

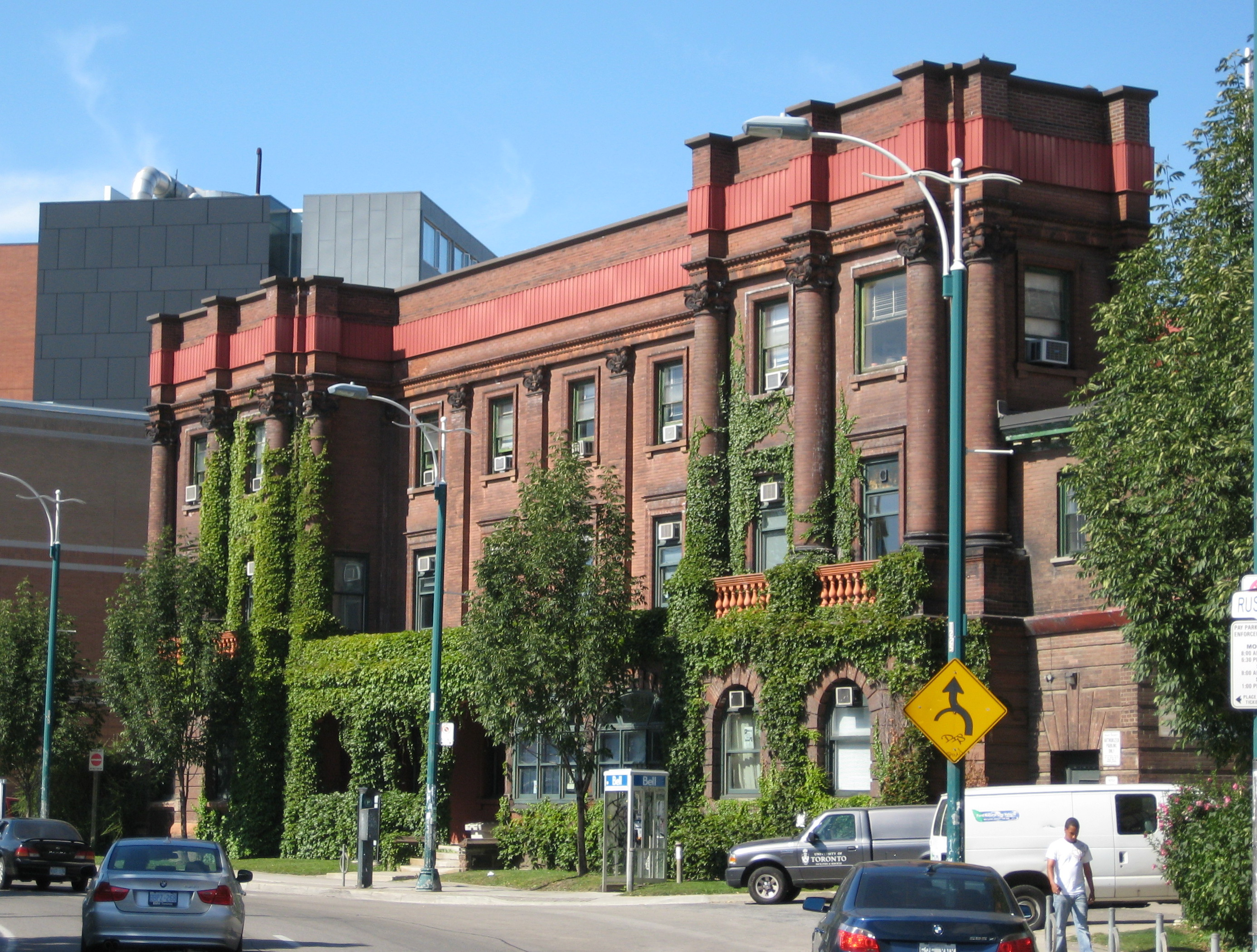
Borden Buildings

The Borden Buildings are two buildings located at 563 Spadina Crescent and 487 Spadina Crescent in Toronto, Ontario, Canada. They were once home to dairy operations and now are used by the University of Toronto.

The two buildings were constructed in 1909 by architect George Martell Miller for City Dairy Company Limited, which was later acquired by Borden Dairy for their Canadian operations.

The buildings were also referred to as City Dairy Stables and are now known as Borden Building South (487 Spadina Cr) and Borden Building North (563 Spadina Cr).
