= Victoria Park station (Toronto) =

Toronto subway station

Victoria Park
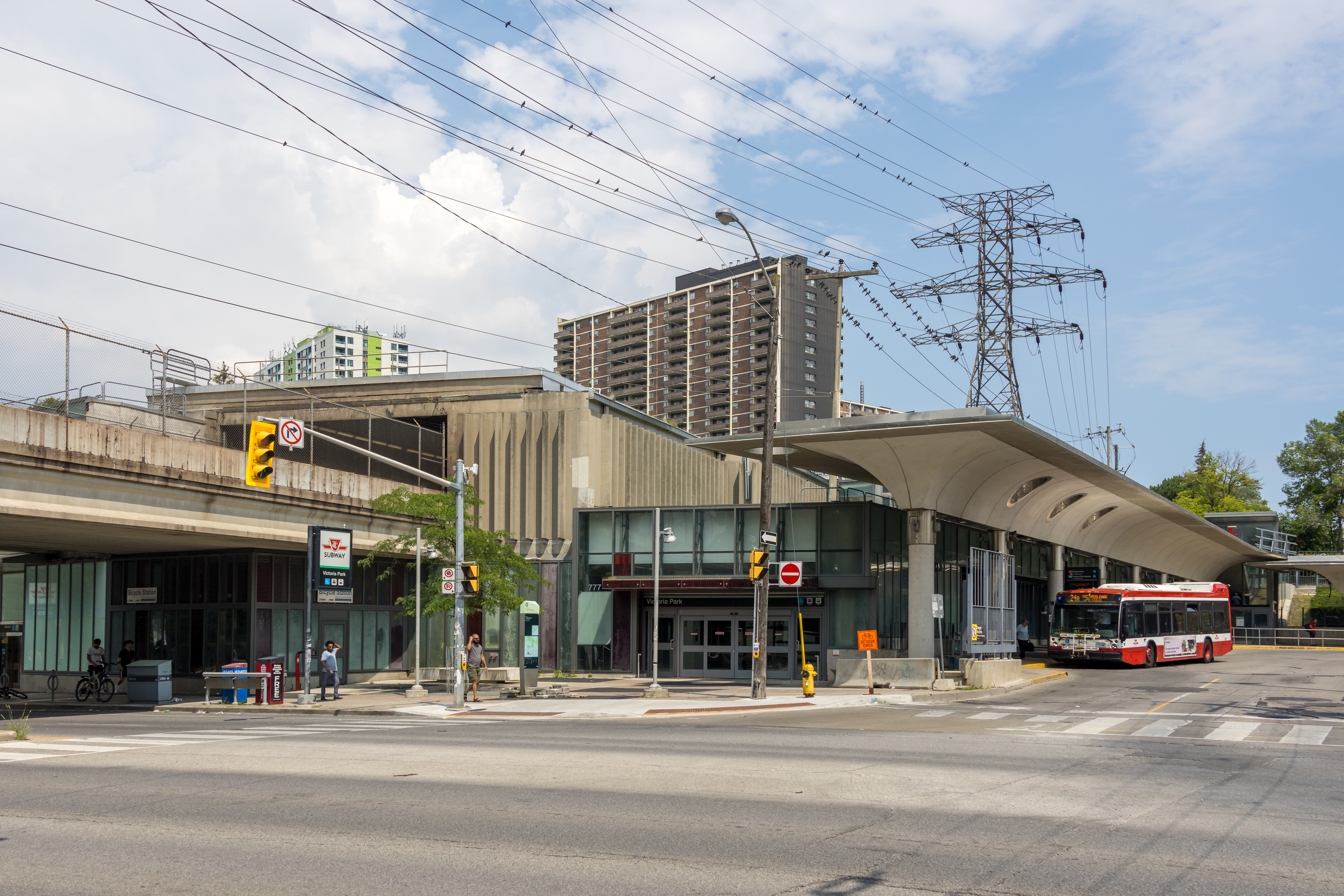

General information
- Location: 777 Victoria Park Avenue, Toronto, Ontario, Canada
- Coordinates: 43°41′42″N 79°17′20″W
- Platforms: Side platforms
- Tracks: 2
- Connections: TTC buses: 12 Kingston Rd; 24 Victoria Park; 67 Pharmacy; 117 Birchmount South; 324 Victoria Park; 404 East York Community Bus; 924 Victoria Park Express

Construction
- Structure type: Elevated
- Cycle facilities: 52 space bicycle station
- Accessible: Yes
- Architect: Stevens Group Architects and Brown and Storey Architects (bus terminal)

Other information
- Website: Official station page

History
- Opened: May 10, 1968; 58 years ago
- Rebuilt: 2008–2011

Passengers
- 2023–2024: 32,276
- Rank: 17 of 70

Services
Preceding station	Toronto Transit Commission	Following station
Main Street towards Kipling	Line 2 Bloor–Danforth	Warden towards Kennedy
Location

Victoria Park is a station on Line 2 Bloor–Danforth of the Toronto subway system. It is located at 777 Victoria Park Avenue, one block north of Danforth Avenue in Scarborough. The station can be accessed by pedestrians directly from Victoria Park Avenue; by way of an unstaffed entrance from Albion Avenue; through an automated entrance from Teesdale Place; and via a walkway that leads to the nearby Crescent Town area. A City of Toronto bicycle station is located adjacent to the main Victoria Park Avenue entrance, providing a paid secure indoor bicycle parking area.

== History ==
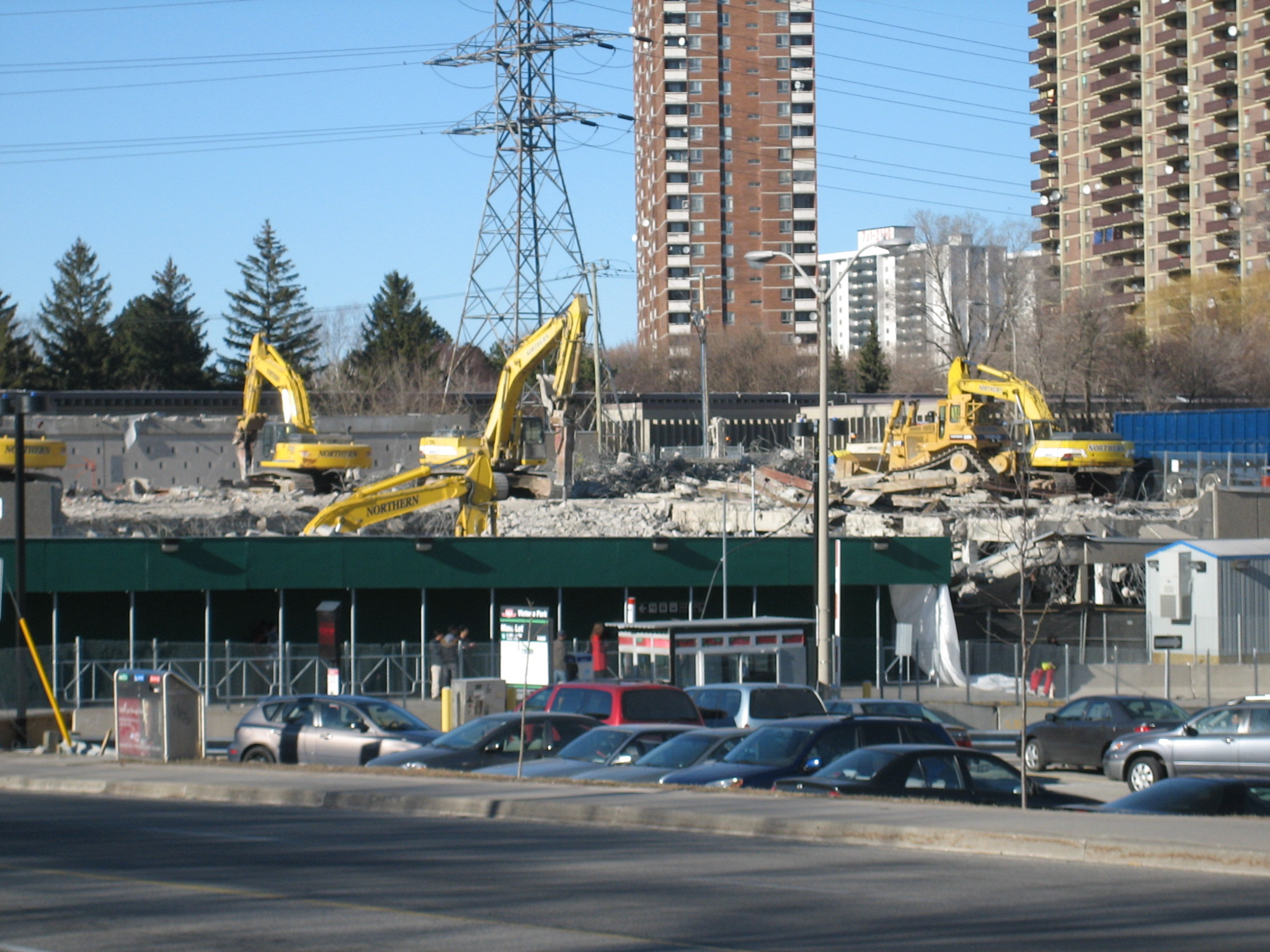
Demolition of old bus bays in 2009

Victoria Park station was opened in 1968 in the Borough of Scarborough, but the access footbridge across Victoria Park Avenue, built in the 1970s, extended into the Borough of East York.

Until 1973, the buses and the subway trains serving the station were in separate fare zones, and so the turnstiles and collector booths were placed between the bus bays and the subway platforms. When the zones were abolished, the layout was reconfigured to bring the buses inside the station's fare-paid area.

The station underwent a large-scale, CA$36 million renovation between 2008 and 2011. The original bus terminal with indoor platforms was demolished and replaced with a new, accessible outdoor bus terminal. New station entrances were built, an indoor bicycle station for parking was opened, and a green roof was added. Interior and exterior finishes were updated, and environmentalist and designer Aniko Meszaros was commissioned to create a permanent art installation, entitled Roots. The station became fully accessible with the addition of elevators.

In November 2021, the city government announced that an agreement had been reached with a developer to build over 500 new homes on a 173-space commuter parking lot at the station. The parking lot permanently closed effective June 3, 2025.

== Architecture and art ==
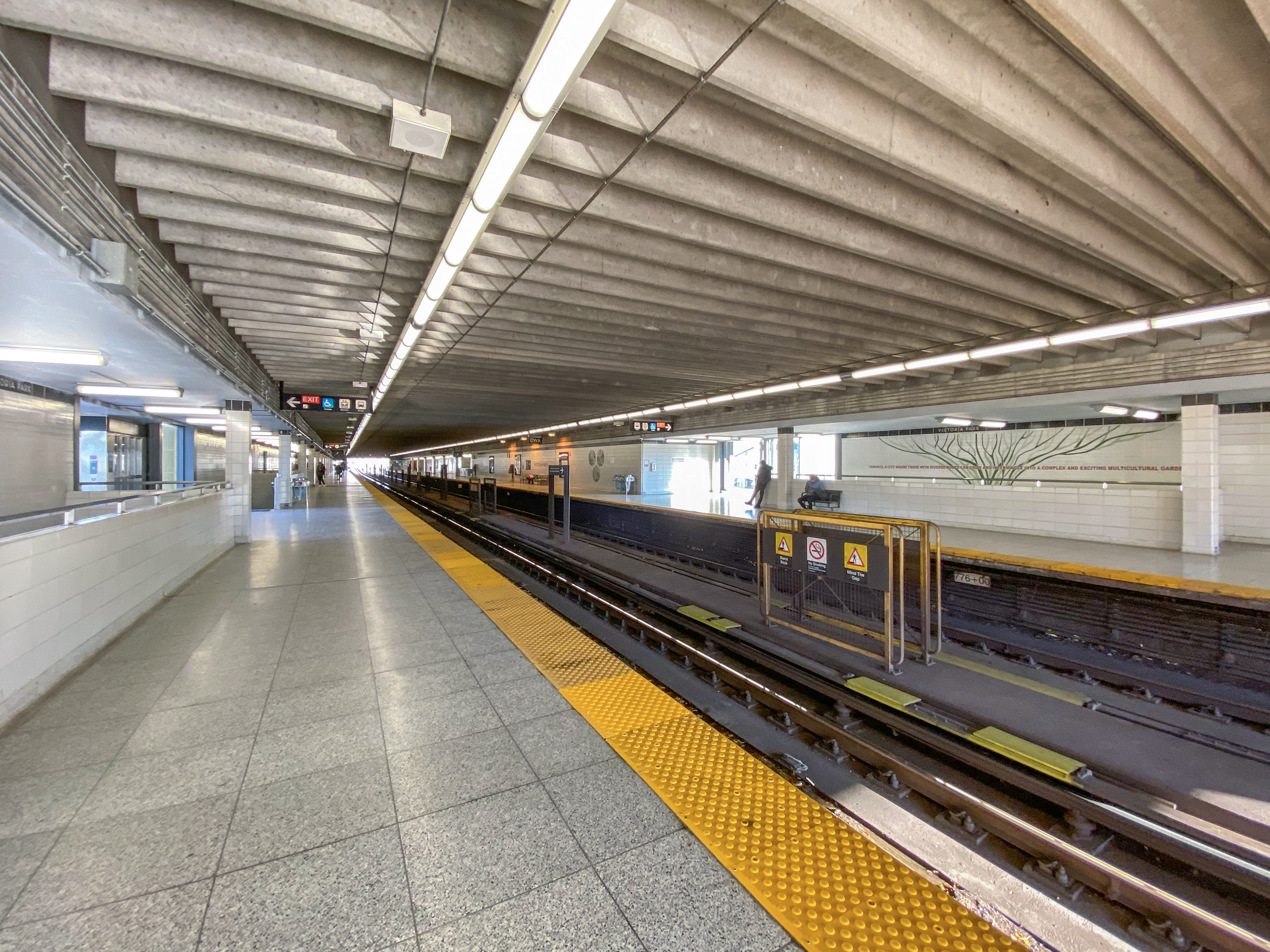
Train platform level

Upon opening in 1968, Victoria Park station's interiors continued on the Bloor–Danforth subway line's design theme of practical simplicity with minimal creative flourishes and no public art. Most overtly, the station's interior walls are clad with the pattern of simple tiles shared with most other stations on the line. The tiles are smooth and unadorned grey block tiles with a narrower row of similar tiles in black meeting the ceiling at platform level. The original signage uses the Toronto Subway Font, with the station name sandblasted onto the walls in large type and painted in the same colour as the strip of black tiles by the ceiling. The flooring is the same basic pattern of terrazzo that appears at most Bloor–Danforth line stations: repeating grey squares separated by strips of aluminum.

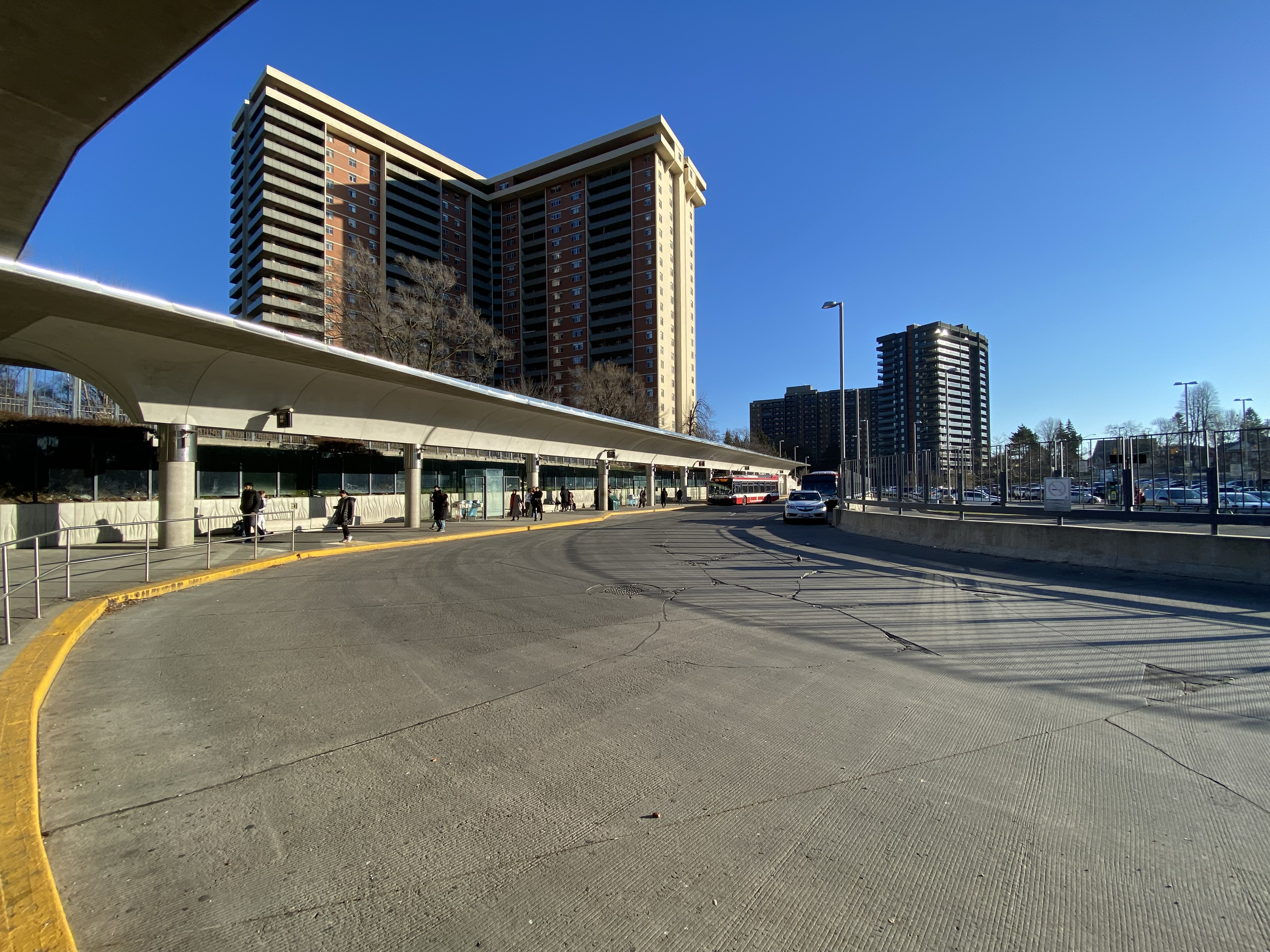
New bus terminal platform

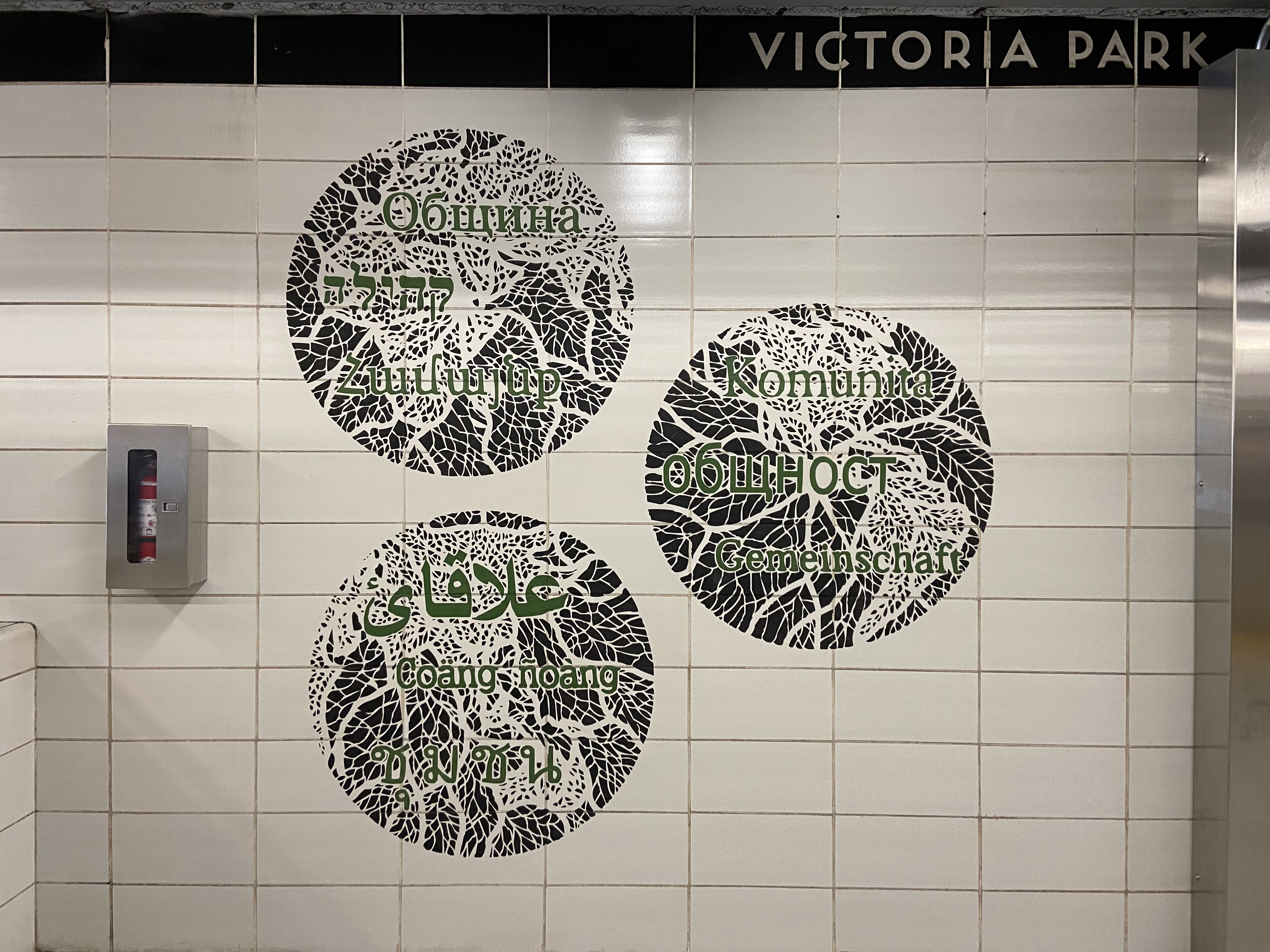
Artwork by Aniko Meszaros on the train platform level

Victoria Park station consists of a concourse at grade where fare control takes place, elevated platforms for subway trains, and a large outdoor bus transfer area. The present bus terminal was completed in 2011 by Stevens Group Architects, with Brown and Storey Architects, landscape architect Scott Torrance, and the TTC's internal design department on the 2008–2011 renovation of the station. It replaced the original enclosed bus terminal, which was an oversized concrete structure with a series of bus bays sheltered by arched roofs. This transfer area is a plaza with a pedestrian walkway that is sheltered by a massive concrete canopy which arches out of a central row of columns. The canopy is perforated with circular openings in certain places for a whimsical effect of lightness, breaking up its shadows on sunny days.

Where the circular holes are cut deeper through the canopy, they are clad with stainless steel inside and contain artwork by designer and environmentalist Aniko Meszaros, as part of her installation entitled, Roots. Meszaros' artwork in this part of the station consists of intricate stainless steel screens akin to filigree with an organic, root-like design. These screens were cut by laser and meant to allow the sun to cast interesting shadows onto the walkway below. The canopy extends beyond the bus transfer area and even the station's prominent glazed entrance on Victoria Park Avenue (also part of the 2008–2011 renovation) to a prominent column on the pedestrian plaza, wrapped with a rounded bench. The eastern edge of the bus transfer plaza is marked by a concrete retaining wall textured with a root motif. It holds up a landscaped slope.

The bus transfer plaza connects with the station's original concourse at surface level. The 2008–2011 renovation introduced the station's prominent glazed entrance on Victoria Park Avenue, which was previously a windowless brick and concrete wall. This entrance consists of a large doorway, with a minimalist glass facade around it accentuated by panes of pink-red glass, including a coloured glass entrance canopy. Above the entranceway, vertical metal trusses are visible behind the glazing. This entrance opens onto a small but functional pedestrian plaza with benches, trees, newspaper boxes, and the entrance to the station's indoor bicycle storage area. The concourse also received contemporary porcelain tiles on certain walls and clear glass mosaic tiles on columns in the renovation. Its ceiling was refinished to include a series of inwardly-sloped sections for visual interest.

Victoria Park's original platform area is an open hall with two side platforms. Unlike most Bloor–Danforth line stations, it has no pillars between its two sets of tracks. Its series of beams running perpendicular to the platforms holding up the roof is a unique aspect of the station's architecture. Though this part of the station is above ground, windows were only introduced in the 2008–2011 renovation. Natural light now pours in through large windows which also allow views of the walkways to the station, the green roof added in the renovation, and the neighbourhood around the station. The green roof consists of low-maintenance sedum plants, whose floral colour changes with the four seasons. The north facade on the other side of the platform wall was also enlivened with a series of large metal panels painted yellow.

In addition to the intricate metal screens in the bus transfer area canopy, Aniko Meszaros designed several other works of art that were integrated into the station in the renovation as part the Roots installation. At platform level, the walls are adorned with a work in which the word "community" is written in different languages over images of the globe depicted as a system of roots. These circular images appear in groups. Large murals on the station's original tiles in the stairwells from the concourse to the platform depict stylized trees from their roots to their branches, along with the poetic statement "Toronto, a city where those with diverse roots can grow and intermingle into a complex and exciting multicultural garden." The concourse features a large wall mural of tree rings.

The underlying concept of the installation alludes to the varied cultural backgrounds of people living in the surrounding neighbourhood and city in general, whose ethnic backgrounds or "roots" colloquially, can be traced to different parts of the world. It also references the green roof and the lush areas surrounding the station.

== Subway infrastructure in the vicinity ==
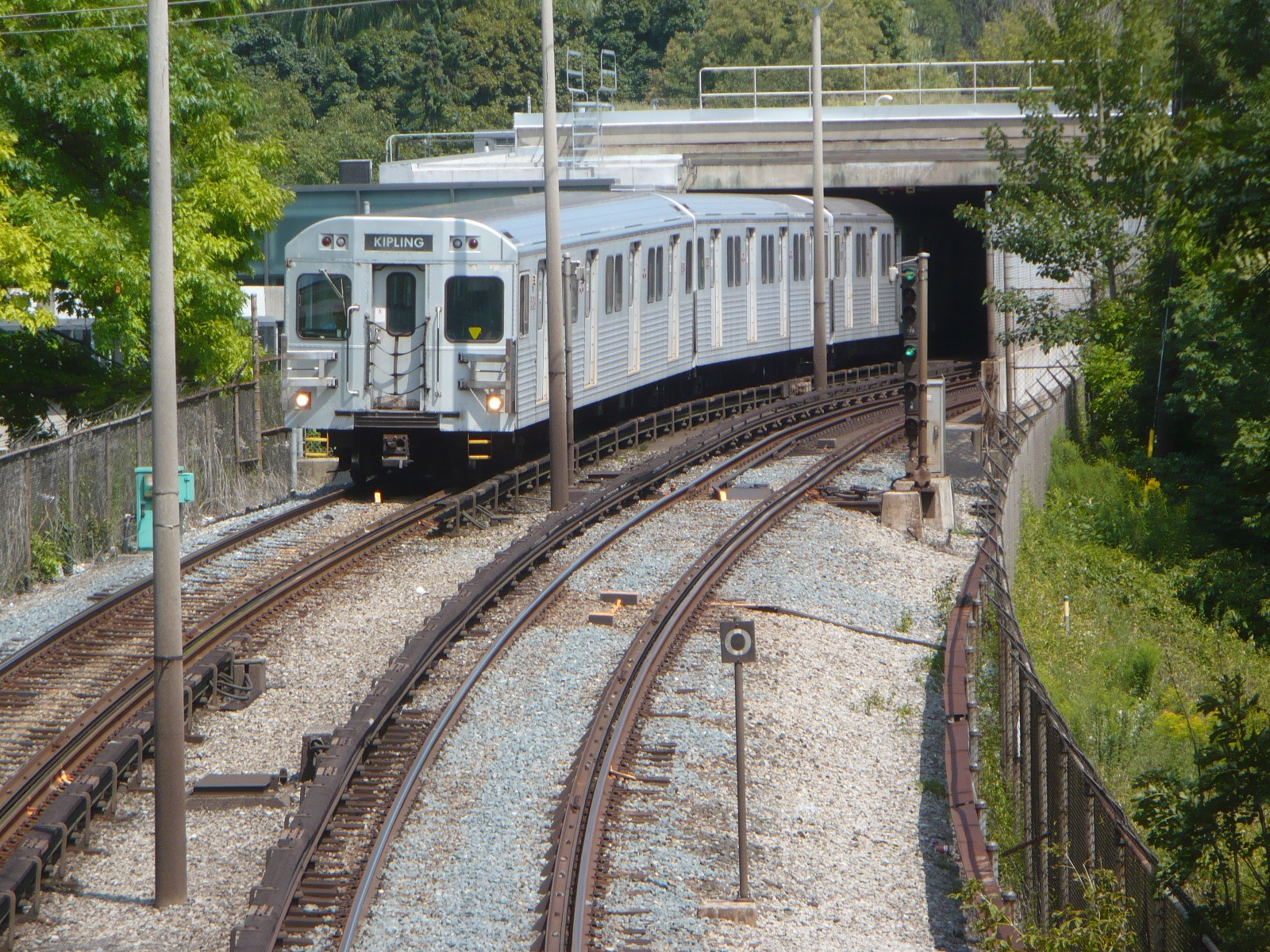
A westbound train departs Victoria Park station towards the Thyra Portal and Main Street station.

Subway trains travelling eastbound towards Victoria Park station from Main Street station exit the tunnel at the Thyra Portal several hundred feet from Victoria Park into an outdoor section of track. Then, a short section of the line is elevated through the station. Continuing east after the station, the track returns to ground level and angles northeast, diagonal to the street grid. Warden Woods Park, a city park that is mostly covered in forest with a central trail, is located on the northwest side of the tracks (on the left side of a train travelling eastbound). The scenery is thus relatively unique—subway trains travelling through forest, particularly when lush trees conceal the neighbourhood on the other side of the tracks in the summer with their leaves.

== Nearby landmarks ==
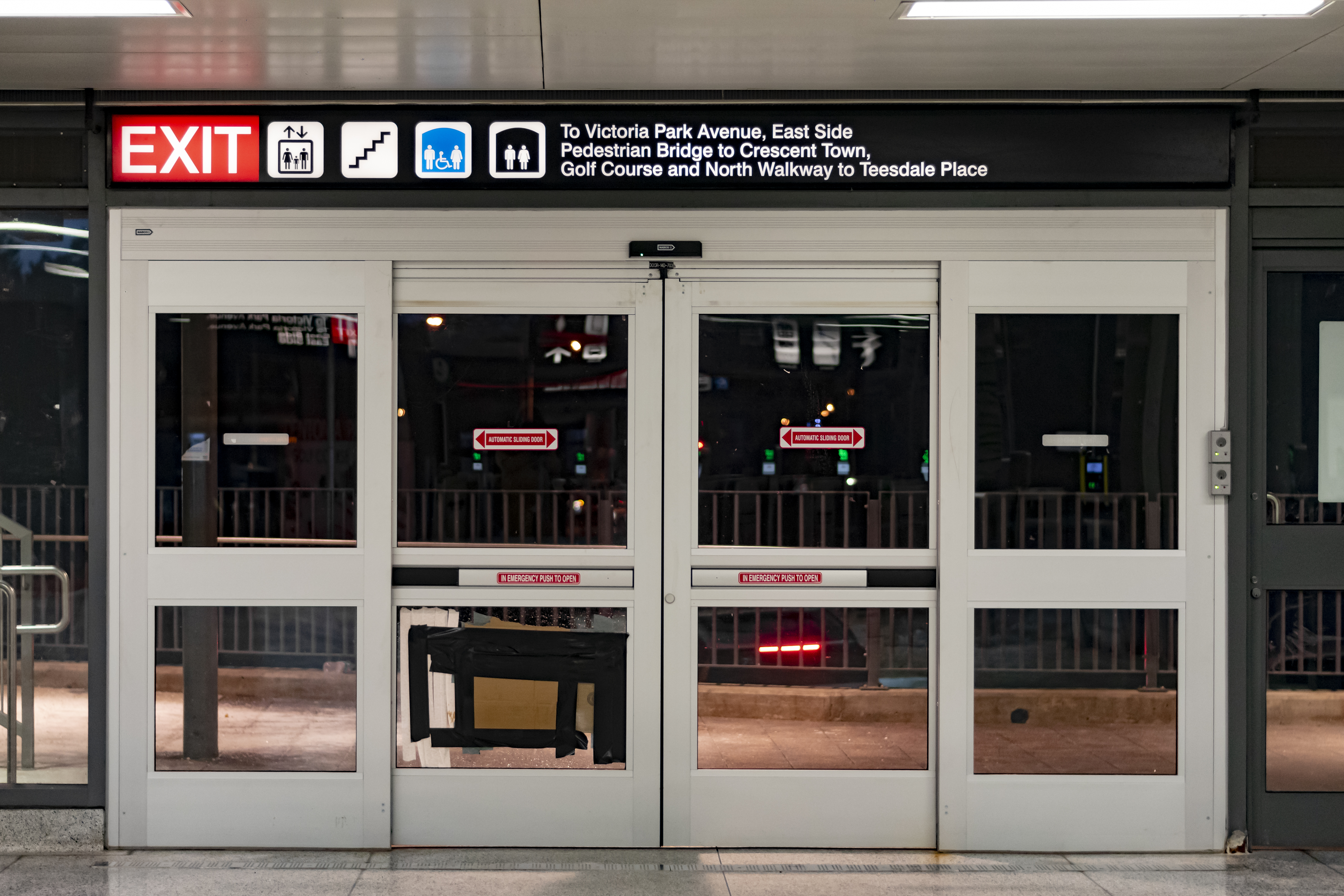
Exit to different landmarks

The stark, unadorned brick towers of the Crescent Town neighbourhood stand to the northwest of the station and are connected by an enclosed pedestrian walkway, which is elevated over Victoria Park Avenue. The Dentonia Park Golf Club is located immediately to the north of the station and is visible through the windows of the westbound platform. The four apartment towers of Teesdale Place stand immediately northeast of the station. They appear similar to Crescent Town but are wider in profile. Cambridge Place at 30 Denton Avenue is a massive apartment building that towers just east of the surface transfer plaza. A significant belt of forested green space with walking paths is located north of the station, passing from the southwest corner of Warden Avenue and St. Clair Avenue East (across the street from Warden station) to the Don Valley at the foot of Don Mills Road. Shoppers World Danforth in Danforth Village is located southwest of the station at Victoria Park and Danforth avenues.

== Surface connections ==
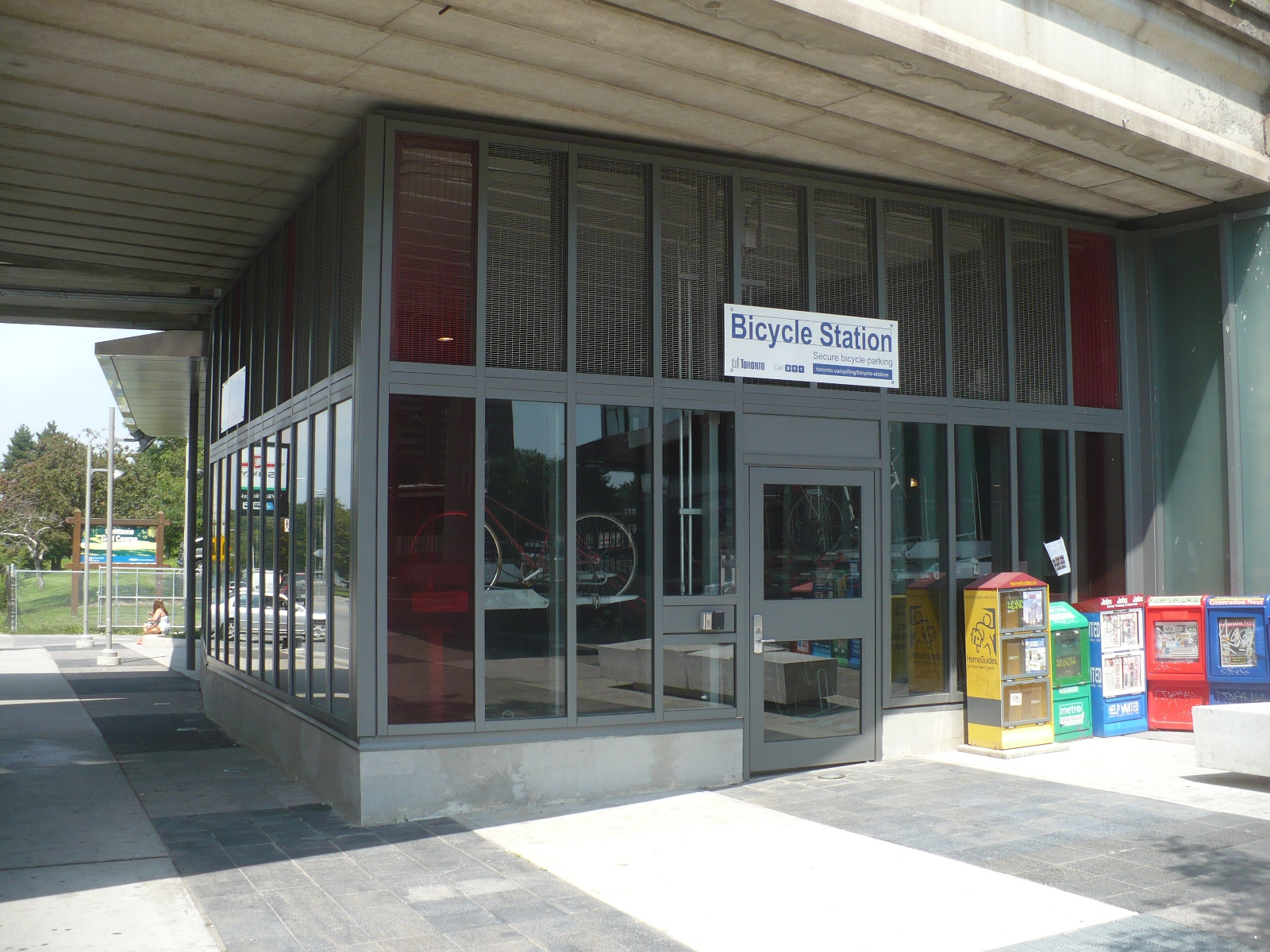
Bicycle parking station near the Victoria Park Avenue entrance

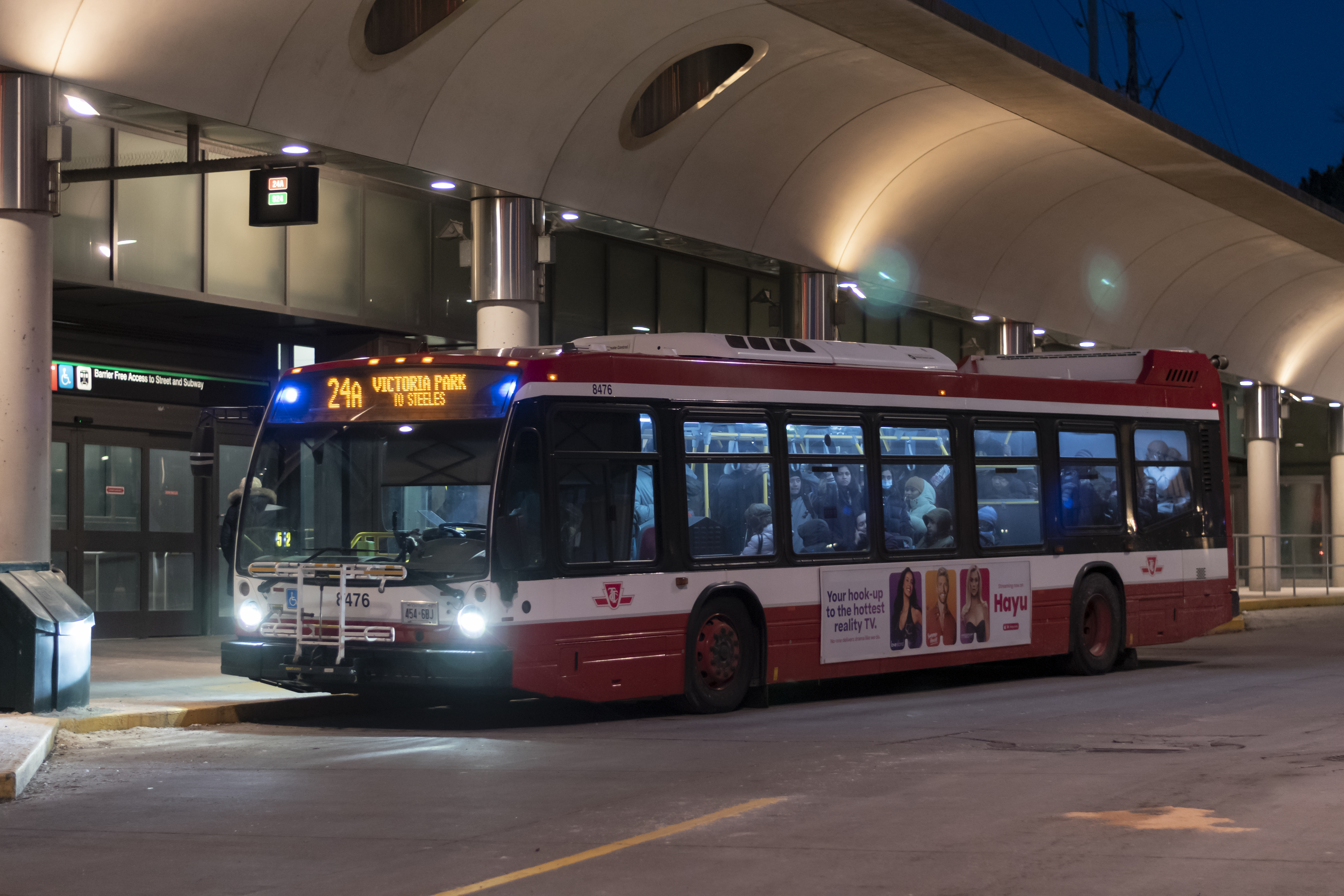
A Nova Bus LFS waiting at the bus platform at night

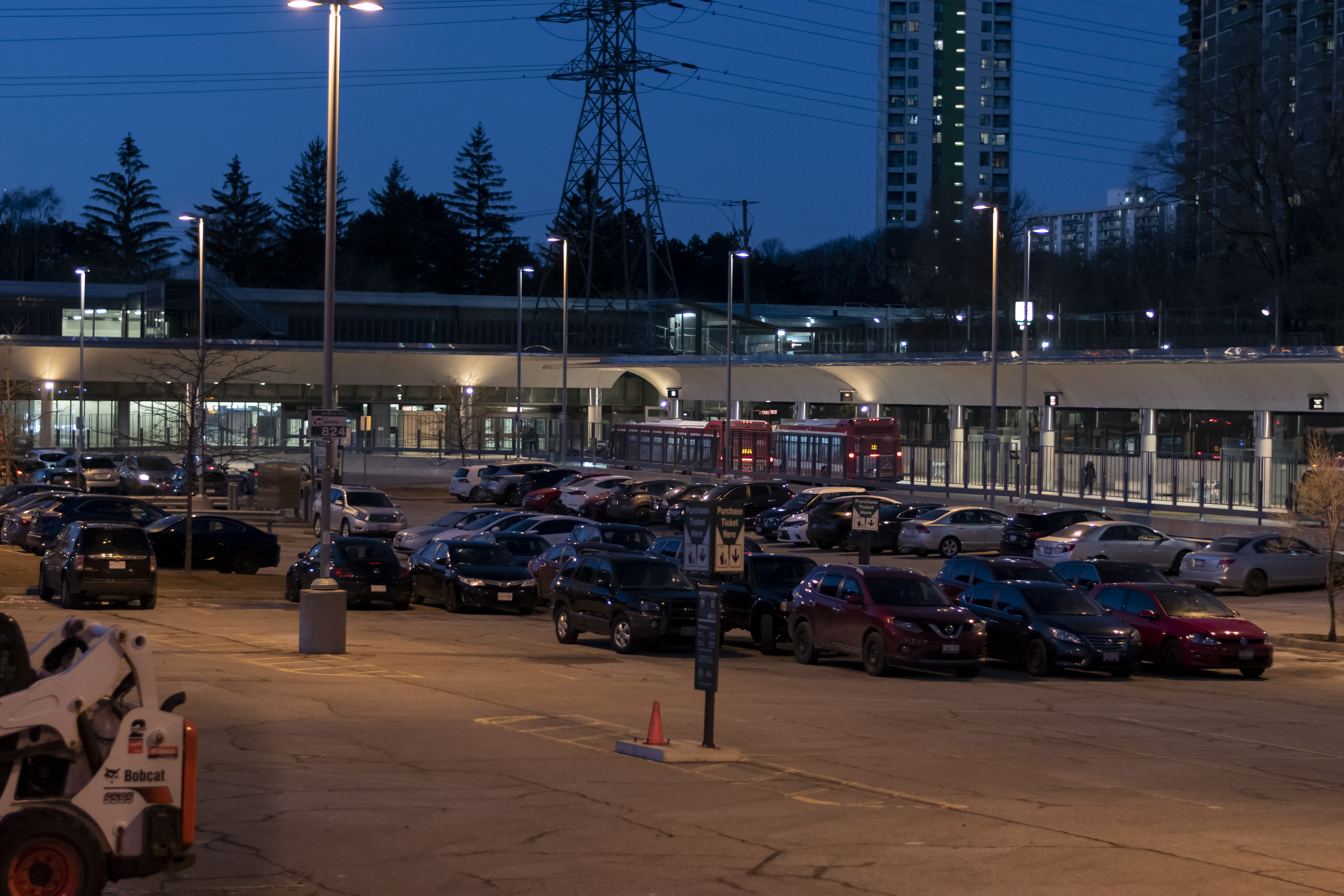
Parking lot at night

TTC routes serving the station include:

Bay number	Route	Name	Additional information
1	Spare		
2	67A	Pharmacy	Northbound to Ellesmere Road via Pharmacy station
2	67B	Pharmacy	Northbound to Pharmacy station (Rush hour service)
2	300A	Bloor-Danforth	Eastbound to Warden Avenue Westbound to Pearson Airport
2	300B	Bloor-Danforth	Eastbound to Kennedy station Westbound to West Mall
3	117	Birchmount South	Northbound to Warden station
3	404	East York	Community bus
4	12A	Kingston Road	Eastbound to Kennedy station via Variety Village and Brimley Road
4	12B	Kingston Road	Eastbound to Kennedy Station via Brimley Road
4	12D	Kingston Road	Eastbound to U of T Scarborough (Rush hour service)
5	24B	Victoria Park	Northbound to Don Mills station via O'Connor station and Consumers Road
6	24A	Victoria Park	Northbound to Steeles Avenue East via O'Connor station
6	924	Victoria Park Express	Northbound to Steeles Avenue East via O'Connor station (Rush hour service)
N/A	324	Victoria Park	Blue Night service; southbound to Bingham Loop and Northbound to Steeles Avenue East via Sheppard Avenue East and Warden Avenue (On-street transfer)

== See also ==
- Royal eponyms in Canada
