= Crescent Town =

- Neighbourhood
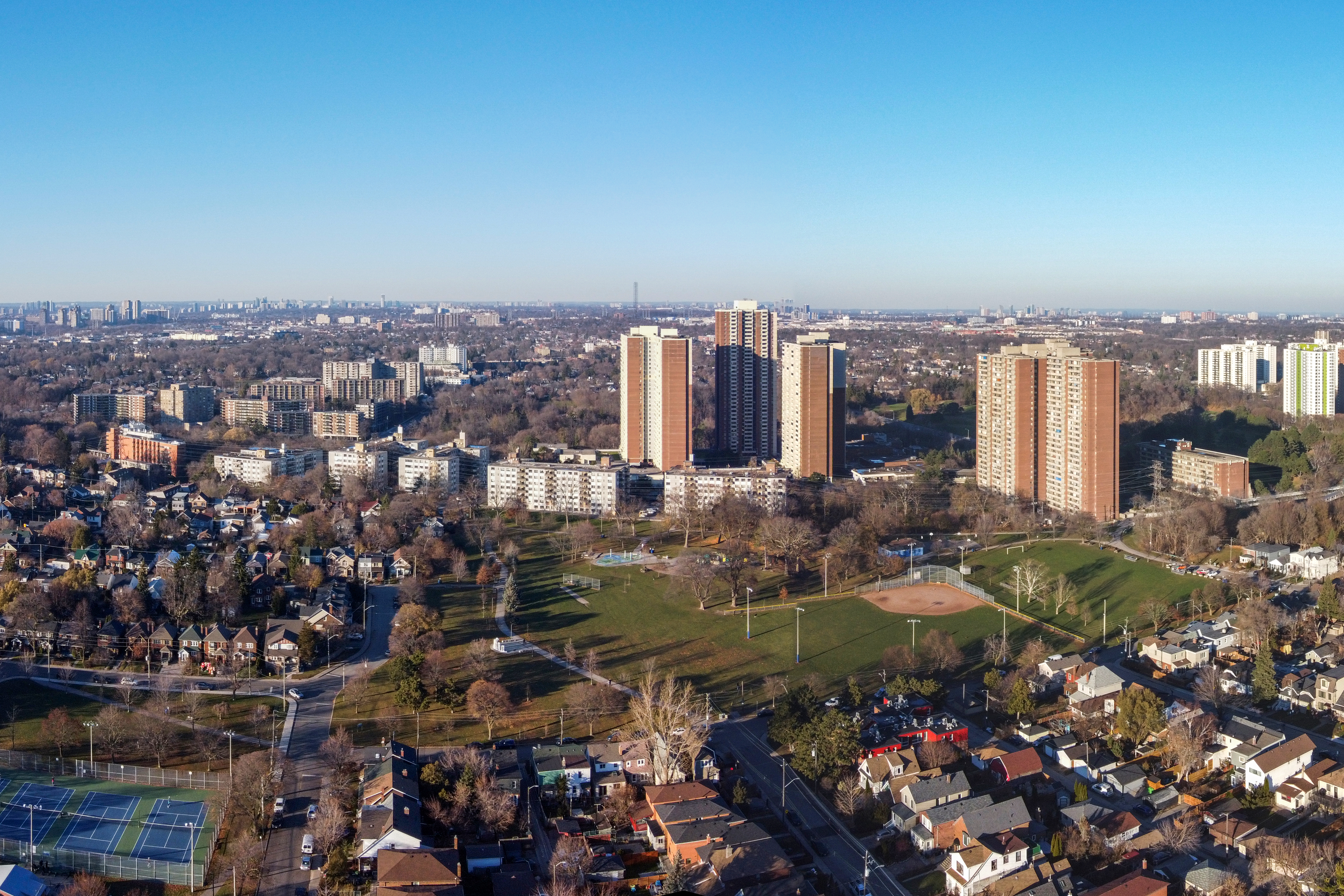
- Crescent Town's buildings

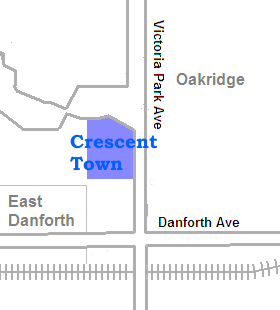
- Position of Crescent Town
- Coordinates: 43°41′45″N 79°17′35″W
- Country: Canada
- Province: Ontario
- City: Toronto
- Community: East York
- Changed Municipality: 1998 Toronto from East York

Government
  - MP: Nathaniel Erskine-Smith (Beaches-East York)
  - MPP: Mary-Margaret McMahon (Beaches-East York)
  - Councillor: Brad Bradford (Ward 19) Beaches-East York)

Crescent Town is a neighbourhood in Toronto, Ontario, Canada, in the former borough of East York. It is located near Victoria Park Avenue and Danforth Avenue. It mainly consists of high-rise apartment complexes, built originally to take advantage of the opening of the adjacent Victoria Park subway station, which connects to the central quadrangle via a partially covered walkway.

== History ==
In the late 19th century, Walter Massey (1864–1901), a younger son of Hart Massey, Canada's first major industrialist, and uncle to actor Raymond Massey, purchased a 240-acre (97 ha) country property centered on Dawes Road and Victoria Park Avenue. He established a model farm and named it "Dentonia Park" after his wife, Susan, whose maiden name was Denton.

The Massey farm sold fresh eggs and poultry as well as fresh trout, which was caught in the many streams and rivulets that criss-crossed the farm. The Massey farm was also the home of the City Dairy Company Limited, which produced the first pasteurized milk in Canada.

In 1933, Susan Massey donated her mansion and 40 acres (16 ha) of the Dentonia farm land to Crescent School, where her grandsons were educated. Crescent School operated at the Dentonia site until 1969, when this property was sold to the developers who built the present-day Crescent Town neighbourhood.

== Current status ==
Crescent Town is considered by some as an interesting experiment in community planning in that all of its pedestrian walkways are located above the street level. It is a multicultural neighbourhood, whose population includes extensive numbers of Bangladeshi, Indian, Jamaican, Pakistani and Tamil Canadians. There are many Bangladeshi-owned businesses near the neighbourhood (Victoria Park-Danforth).

Some of the buildings are condominiums (Massey Square), while others are rental apartments (Crescent Place). Toronto council classified Oakridge under Taylor-Massey as a neighbourhood improvement area in 2014.
