= Team EY =

Youth skateboarding program in Toronto

Team EY (Team East York Skateboarding) is a youth group which promotes a positive skateboarding community in the East York area of Toronto.

Team EY Logo.

== History ==
Officially formed in 1998, Team EY has worked to create a welcoming skateboarding community for both new and current skateboarders. Team EY began with word-of-mouth contests hosted for free in local schoolyards and do-it-yourself skateboard videos featuring local talent. Over the years it continued to grow and connected with other local community groups and city councilors to foster better understanding and acceptance of skateboarding in East York. The culmination of these relationships was the construction of the permanent East York Skatepark at Stan Wadlow Park in 2006.

== East York Skatepark ==
Team EY, supported by Toronto city councilor Janet Davis, collaborated with the local community and Spectrum Skatepark Creations to build the East York Skatepark. The design process engaged local youth to ensure that the skateboard park reflected the needs of the local skateboarders. Team EY hosted the opening celebrations of the park in June 2006 and has continued to be involved with the skateboard park: organizing annual spring cleanup weekends, mural paintings, contests, concrete repair work, as well as hosting a memorial fund raiser and annual remembrance events.

== Promoting Skateboarding and Skateboard Parks ==
To help Ontario communities build skateboard parks of their own, Team EY hosted seminars and lectures at the PRO Forum 2009 (Park & Recreation Ontario) to share their community engagement and skateboard park maintenance strategies. Team EY also attends public consultation meetings and participates on the design teams of several skateboarding parks across Ontario. Team EY has shared its success story and the process for building a skateboard park in a two-part series of interviews on MuchMusic.

Team EY has also partnered with Toronto Parks & Recreation to organize winter skateboarding lessons and drop-in programs at S.H. Armstrong Community Center (2007–present) and the St. Lawrence North Market (2008 & 2009).

Team EY built the first ever indoor skateboard park in East York, the 'EY Skate Loft' in October 2010.

=== Skateboarding Camps ===
To engage new youth in skateboarding, Team EY has offered summer skateboarding camps since 2006, which emphasize teaching safety and the development of skateboarding skills in a fun, positive and healthy environment.

== Awards and Recognitions ==
The dedicated work of Team EY has been recognized by the greater Toronto community, earning them the award for 'Toronto Youth Group of the Year' in 2007. More recently, their successful collaboration with city planners was described, by John Lorinc, in one of 14 essays in the 2010 book Local Motion The Art of Civic Engagement in Toronto.

== Films ==
Team EY's early skateboarding videos, featuring local talent, have developed a strong following, which led to a series of skateboarding films produced by PEPstudios & ZooMediaphile. These have documented Team EY's progression and extensive skateboard trips around the world, including: Canada, the U.S., Spain, England, Europe, Morocco, South-East Asia, U.A.E. and Japan. The films have premiered at local skateboard parks, at the 1st Annual Toronto Skateboarding Film Festival 2004, in local movie theaters, including The Danforth Music Hall and were the last show at The Toronto Roxy Theater, always drawing an audience of several hundred skateboarding enthusiasts and community supporters.
