= City Dairy Company Limited =

Canadian dairy company

City Dairy Company Limited was a dairy products firm that was established to deliver high-quality milk in the city of Toronto, Ontario. It was founded by Walter Massey (1864–1901), the president of Massey-Harris and a member of the prominent Massey family. It was the first Canadian dairy company to supply pasteurized milk.

== Origins ==
The company was founded after Massey whom opened his Dentonia Park farm in 1897 to raised a herd of dairy cattle. consisting of Guernsey, Jersey and Ayrshire cows. The farm was originally opened to supply milk for the Masseys’, but the booming milk market and Massey’s desire for safer milk resulted in the creation of a commercial dairy operation.

== Commercial operations ==
Once Massey embarked on being a commercial operation in 1901, the milk from these cows was sent to a dairy plant at 487 and 563 Spadina Crescent, later known as the Borden Buildings.

City Dairy was one of 15 dairies to supply milk to Toronto residents, one of the closest to the city and noted for the use of pasteurization (1903) to rid of deadly food born disease that plagued 19th Century Toronto.

By 1915, City Dairy controlled 40 per cent of the milk market in Toronto.

== Later years and closure of farm ==
Although Massey had died in 1901, the dairy operation continued until it was sold to Borden in 1930 for $7 million, which acquired a number of local dairies that competed with City Dairy including Caufiled’s Dairy (c. 1888).

The farm closed after Borden took over the processing business and Massey family donated the farm lands.

== Rivals and later entrants ==
In 1913 City Dairy was one of 15 dairies in Toronto:

- Caufield and Sons/Caufield’s Dairy c 1888-1945 - was acquired by Borden 1929
- Brampton Dairy
- Acme Dairy Limited/Acme Farmer Dairy - acquired by Eastern Dairies in 1929, Dominion Dairies Limited of Montreal in 1943, National Dairy Products of New York in 1961 with Sealtest branding and final under Ault Foods in 1981.
- Farmer’s Dairy
- Toronto Creamery
- Briar Hill Dairy
- White Oak Dairy
- S. Price and Sons Limited - founded 1891 by Stephen Price with milk supplied from his family farm and sold to City Dairy in 1911.
- J. O. Reynolds
- Riverdale Dairy
- Richardson’s Brothers
- High Park Dairy
- Walmer Dairy - site now home to George Brown College

Walker, Richardson, Briar Hill and Acme where located near each other and commemorated by the City of Toronto with renamed roadway called Cream Top Lane.

Other dairy companies that existed before major producers dominated the market were local retailers with some providing delivery by wagons:

- Roselawn Farms Dairy
- Fairglen Dairy - opened in 1934 and later became Kemp’s Fairglen Dairy before being acquired by Silverwood Dairy in 1961.
- Oakland Dairy
- Rogers Dairy - 1930-1967
- Uplands Dairy - mergered with Mac’s Milk in 1968.
