= East York =

Former municipality in Ontario, Canada

- Dissolved borough (lower-tier)
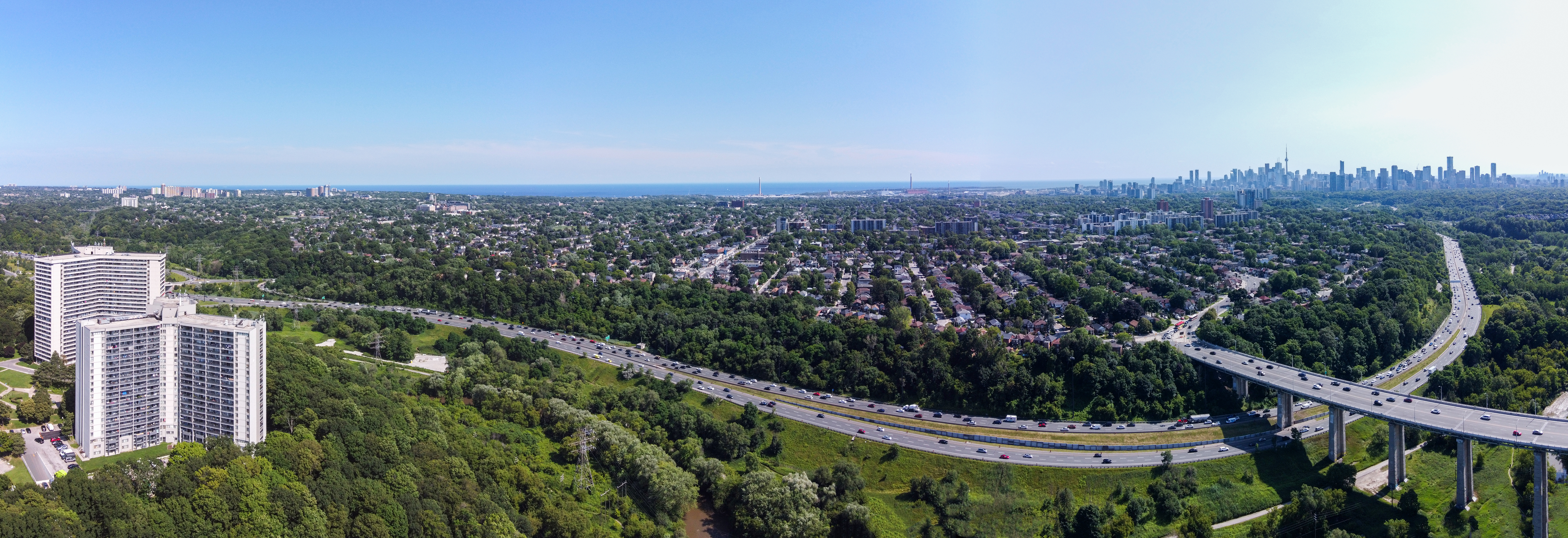
- Don Valley Parkway in East York

- Flag Logo

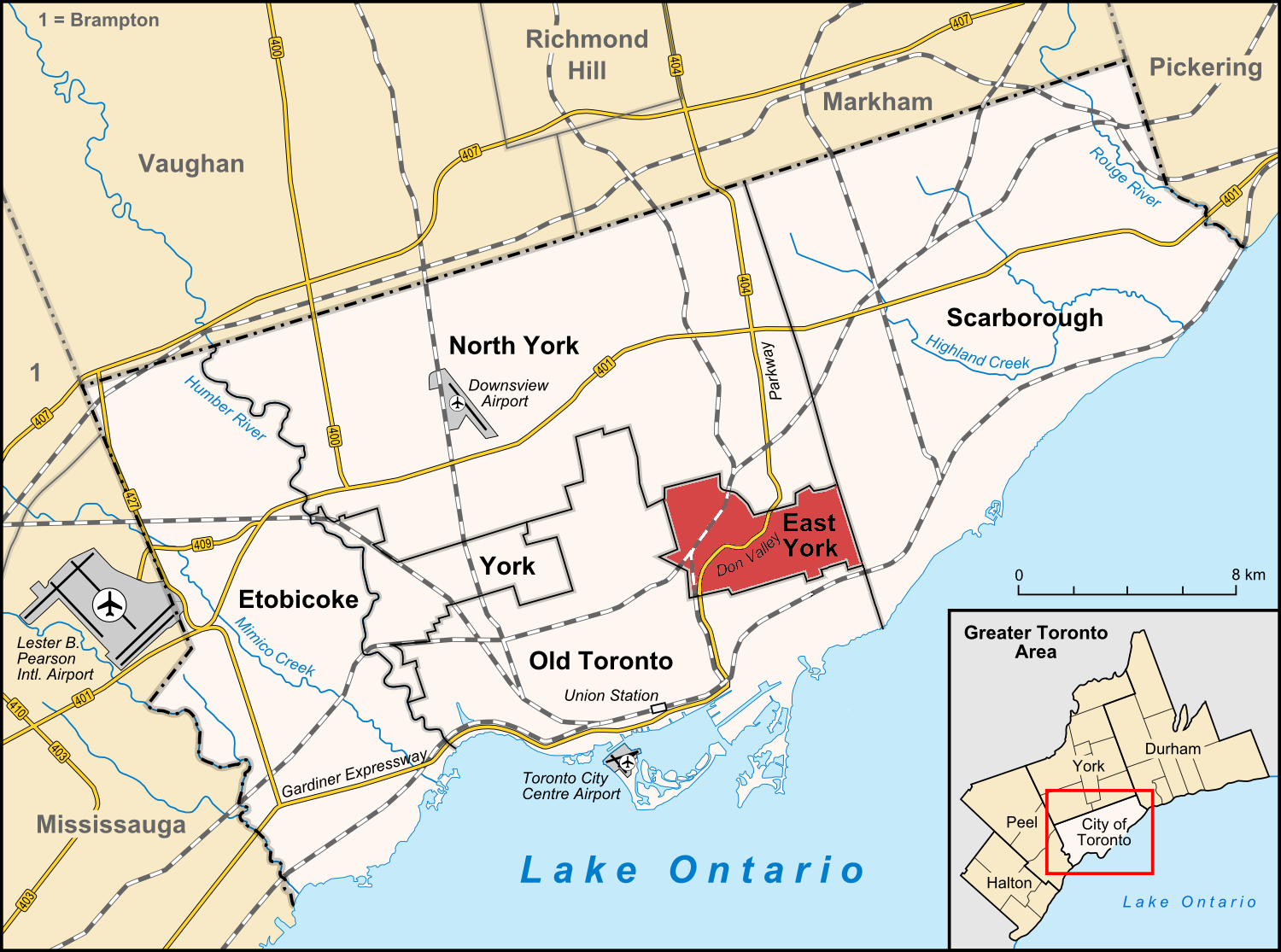
- Location of East York (red) compared to the rest of Toronto.
- Interactive map of East York
- Coordinates: 43°41′28.68″N 79°19′40.08″W
- Country: Canada
- Province: Ontario
- Municipality: Toronto
- Incorporated: January 1, 1924 (Township); January 1, 1967 (Borough)
- Changed Region: 1953 Metropolitan Toronto from York County
- Amalgamated: January 1, 1998 into Toronto

Government
  - MPs: Nathaniel Erskine-Smith (Beaches-East York) Rob Oliphant (Don Valley West) Julie Dabrusin (Toronto-Danforth)
  - MPPs: Mary-Margaret McMahon (Beaches-East York) Stephanie Bowman (Don Valley West) Peter Tabuns (Toronto-Danforth)
  - Mayor: Olivia Chow (City of Toronto)
  - Councillors: Brad Bradford (Beaches-East York) Rachel Chernos Lin (Don Valley West) Paula Fletcher (Toronto-Danforth)

Area
  - Total: 21.26 km^{2} (8.21 sq mi)

Population (2021)
  - Total: 116,399
  - Density: 5,475/km^{2} (14,180/sq mi)
- Time zone: UTC-5 (EST)
  - Summer (DST): UTC-4 (EDT)
- Postal code span: M4B, M4C, M4E, M4G, M4H, M4J, M4K
- Area codes: 416, 647, 437, 942

East York is a former municipality within Toronto, Ontario, Canada. From 1967 to 1998, it was officially the Borough of East York, a borough within the upper-tier municipality of Metropolitan Toronto. The borough was dissolved in 1998 when it was amalgamated with the other lower-tier municipalities of Metropolitan Toronto to form the new "megacity" of Toronto. Prior to its amalgamation, East York was Ontario's last remaining borough.

It is separated by the Don River from the former City of Toronto. Traditional East York is southeast of the river, and the neighbourhoods of Leaside, Bennington Heights and densely populated Thorncliffe Park – which were amalgamated with the then-township of East York in 1967, to form the new borough – are northwest of the river. The heart of East York is filled with middle-class and working-class homes, built for returning WWII veterans and, later, the early baby boomers.

== History ==
East York was originally part of York Township, Ontario. Following the incorporation of the Township of North York in 1922, York Township was divided by Toronto, Leaside and North Toronto. With the rapid growth that followed the opening of the Bloor-Danforth (Prince Edward) Viaduct in 1918, the residents of the eastern half of York Township (as an exclave of the western half) felt they had been neglected by the township when it came to roads, sewers and other municipal services. Left with the option to either join the City of Toronto or branch out on its own, 448 East Yorkers voted to incorporate a new township, while 102 voted to amalgamate with Toronto. The Township of East York was incorporated on January 1, 1924 with a population of 19,849. The western half of York Township retained its name.

East York was originally populated by working-class English people. Many had immigrated from Lancashire and Yorkshire. In 1961, 71.7% of the population identified themselves as having British origins.

In the late 1940s, after World War II, East York became home to many returning veterans and their families. Many inexpensive homes were built by the government, including the houses around Topham Park, to house the returning veterans and the baby boomers. These were predominantly single detached homes with front yards and back gardens. The local government was both socially conscious and frugal, fitting the residents' self-image of East York as filled with supportive neighbours and non-government organizations.

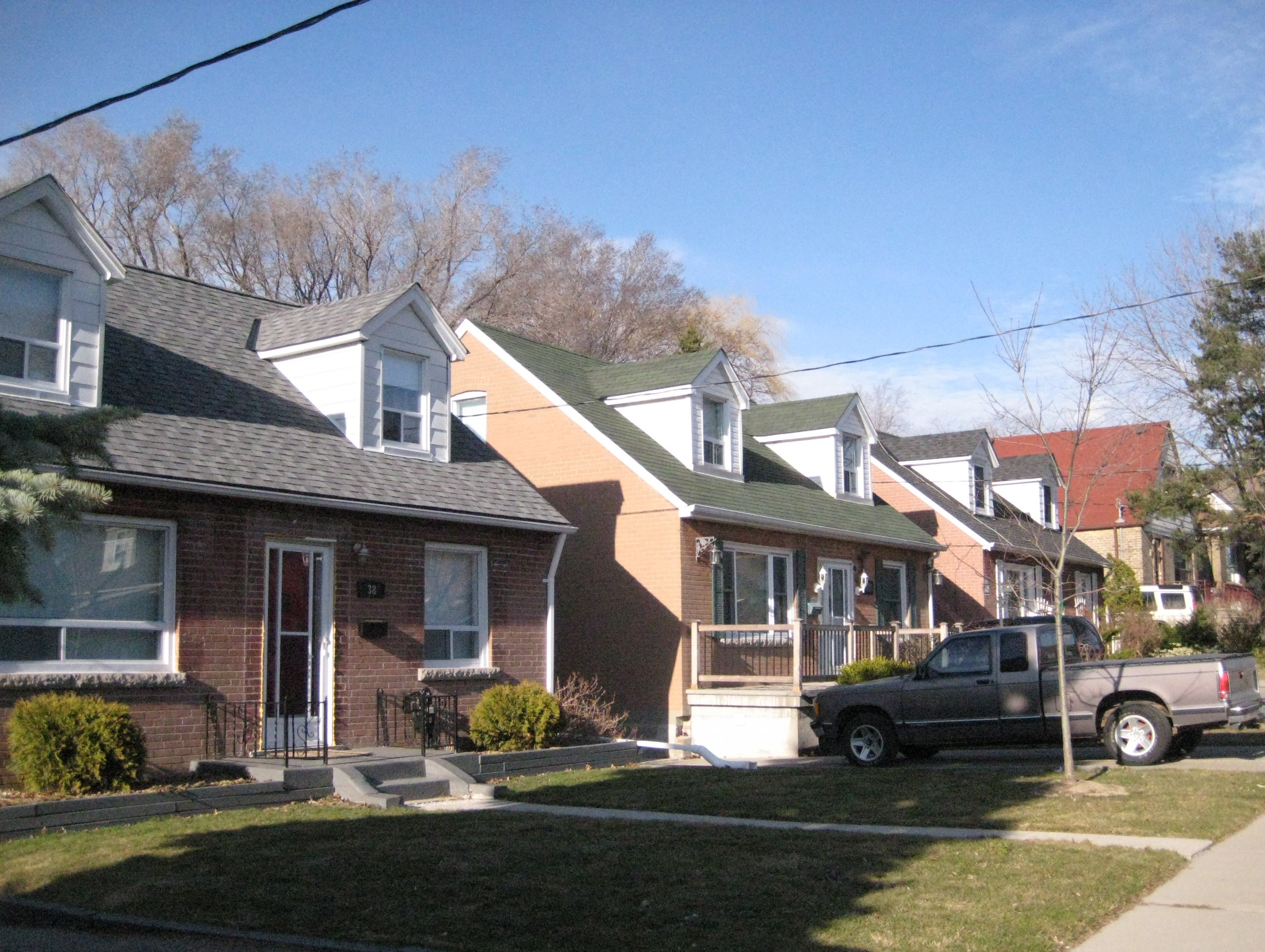
Post-war bungalows built in East York after World War II.

For many years, East York did not allow the serving of alcoholic beverages in any restaurants, etc. The result was a heavy concentration of alcohol-serving restaurants and bars on Danforth Avenue, the main street in the city of Toronto running east–west just south of East York. The prohibition of serving alcohol was eliminated in the 1970s.

The borough of East York was established in 1967 through the amalgamation of the former township of East York and the former town of Leaside. Leaside was a planned industrial and residential community. East York has over the years been a residential enclave for senior citizens, as the original owners from the 1940s age and as younger families move out to suburbs to live in larger houses. East York had its own fire department with three stations, which are still in operation today under the combined Toronto Fire Services. As Canada's only borough, East York was semi-autonomous within the greater municipality of Metropolitan Toronto.

In 1998, Metro Toronto and its constituent municipalities were dissolved and replaced by the new "megacity" of Toronto. East York's last mayor was Michael Prue who went on to become city councillor for East York, and then a Member of Provincial Parliament for Beaches—East York in 2001. Between 2002 and 2005, the East York Civic Centre's "True Davidson Council Chamber" was used to hold the Toronto Computer Leasing Inquiry/Toronto External Contracts Inquiry.

During the COVID-19 pandemic, many residents of East York stood up against illegal rent increases. This came in the form of protests, rent strikes, and community organizing.

Over the last few decades, rapid gentrification has changed East York. Many single-story bungalows have added second floors, and shops have been converted to become more upscale.

== Geography ==
East York is located not far from the mouth of the Don River. The municipality borders Scarborough to the east, Old Toronto to the south and west, and North York to the north. East York is located north of Danforth Avenue between the Don River and Victoria Park Avenue.

== Demographics ==
Federal census population history of East York
Year	Pop.	±%
1931	36,080	—
1941	41,821	+15.9%
1951	64,616	+54.5%
1956	69,642	+7.8%
1961	72,409	+4.0%
1966	74,200	+2.5%
1971	104,784	+41.2%
1976	106,950	+2.1%
1981	101,974	−4.7%
1986	101,085	−0.9%
1991	102,696	+1.6%
1996	107,822	+5.0%
2001	115,185	+6.8%
Source: Statistics Canada

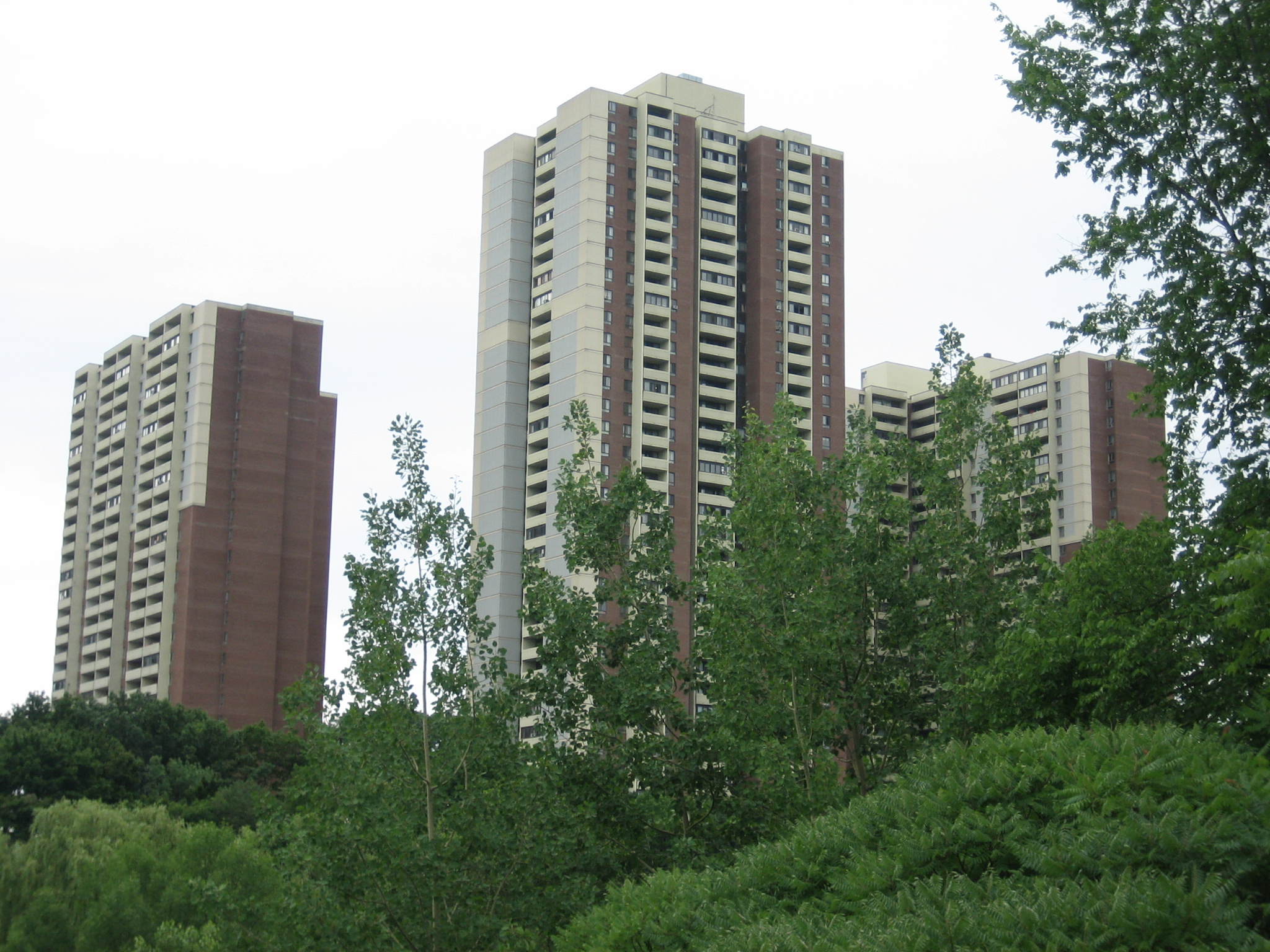
Crescent Town is home to a number of residents who immigrated to Canada.

East York's population was 115,185 in 2001.

=== Religion ===
The religious affiliations of the East York population are consistent with its ethnic composition. Some 63.4% of the population adheres to Christianity, with an almost even split between Catholics (23.6%) and Protestants (25.3%). Christian Orthodox and unspecified types of Christianity make up 12.0% and 2.5% respectively. The largest non-Christian religious group is Muslim, who make up 12.6% of religious adherents, followed by Hinduism (3.7%), Buddhism (1.6%), and Judaism (0.9%). A sizable percentage of the population (17.1%) has no religious affiliation.

There is also Estonian House which is the unofficial Estonian Consulate in Toronto. The building houses banquets, social events, and an Estonian school.

=== Language ===
While English is the dominant language in the area, nearly half (42.6%) of the population reports that their first language was neither English nor French.

=== Ethnicity ===
Largest ethnic origin in East York by census tract based on the 2021 census

Since the 1970s, the population composition has changed from predominantly British, as East York has become a major arrival point for immigrants, many of whom have established their first Canadian residence in the apartments that became plentiful in Thorncliffe Park, Crescent Town and elsewhere on or near main streets. Almost half of the population in 2001 (45.1%) was foreign-born, and of these, 49.0% had immigrated to the area between 1991 and 2001. These groups include Bengalis, Indians, Pakistanis, Jamaicans, Filipinos and Sri Lankans. East York also has a well established Greek population and a growing Chinese community. In 2006 the percentage of visible minorities was 38.4%, and the percentage of immigrants was 44.4%.

Panethnic groups in East York (1996−2021)
Panethnic group	2021 Canadian census (Note: Total of 27 census tracts from 5350180.00 through 5350196.02 in the Toronto CMA, all situated in the former East York census subdivision.)		2016 Canadian census (Note: Total of 27 census tracts from 5350180.00 through 5350196.02 in the Toronto CMA, all situated in the former East York census subdivision.)		2011 Canadian census (Note: Total of 24 census tracts from 5350180.00 through 5350196.00 in the Toronto CMA, all situated in the former East York census subdivision.)		2006 Canadian census (Note: Total of 24 census tracts from 5350180.00 through 5350196.00 in the Toronto CMA, all situated in the former East York census subdivision.)		2001 Canadian census		1996 Canadian census	
Panethnic group	Pop.	%	Pop.	%	Pop.	%	Pop.	%	Pop.	%	Pop.	%
European (Note: Statistic includes all persons that did not make up part of a visible minority or an indigenous identity.)	60,855	52.71%	65,445	55.97%	68,105	59.7%	67,985	61.07%	72,735	63.67%	72,425	67.83%
South Asian	20,140	17.44%	20,300	17.36%	19,060	16.71%	19,340	17.37%	17,075	14.95%	11,705	10.96%
African	8,325	7.21%	6,800	5.82%	5,155	4.52%	4,620	4.15%	4,485	3.93%	5,945	5.57%
East Asian (Note: Statistic includes total responses of "Chinese", "Korean", and "Japanese" under visible minority section on census.)	7,670	6.64%	7,925	6.78%	7,250	6.36%	8,180	7.35%	8,400	7.35%	7,815	7.32%
Southeast Asian (Note: Statistic includes total responses of "Filipino" and "Southeast Asian" under visible minority section on census.)	6,425	5.56%	6,105	5.22%	6,270	5.5%	5,390	4.84%	5,250	4.6%	4,400	4.12%
Middle Eastern (Note: Statistic includes total responses of "West Asian" and "Arab" under visible minority section on census.)	5,120	4.43%	4,400	3.76%	3,220	2.82%	2,520	2.26%	2,255	1.97%	1,875	1.76%
Latin American	2,420	2.1%	1,815	1.55%	1,540	1.35%	900	0.81%	985	0.86%	730	0.68%
Indigenous	1,415	1.23%	1,575	1.35%	1,390	1.22%	725	0.65%	885	0.77%	395	0.37%
Other/multiracial (Note: Statistic includes total responses of "Visible minority, n.i.e." and "Multiple visible minorities" under visible minority section on census.)	3,090	2.68%	2,570	2.2%	2,080	1.82%	1,660	1.49%	2,175	1.9%	1,490	1.4%
Total responses	115,460	99.19%	116,935	99.04%	114,070	98.88%	111,320	99.34%	114,240	99.18%	106,780	99.03%
Total population	116,399	100%	118,071	100%	115,365	100%	112,054	100%	115,185	100%	107,822	100%
Note: Totals greater than 100% due to multiple origin responses.

== Education ==
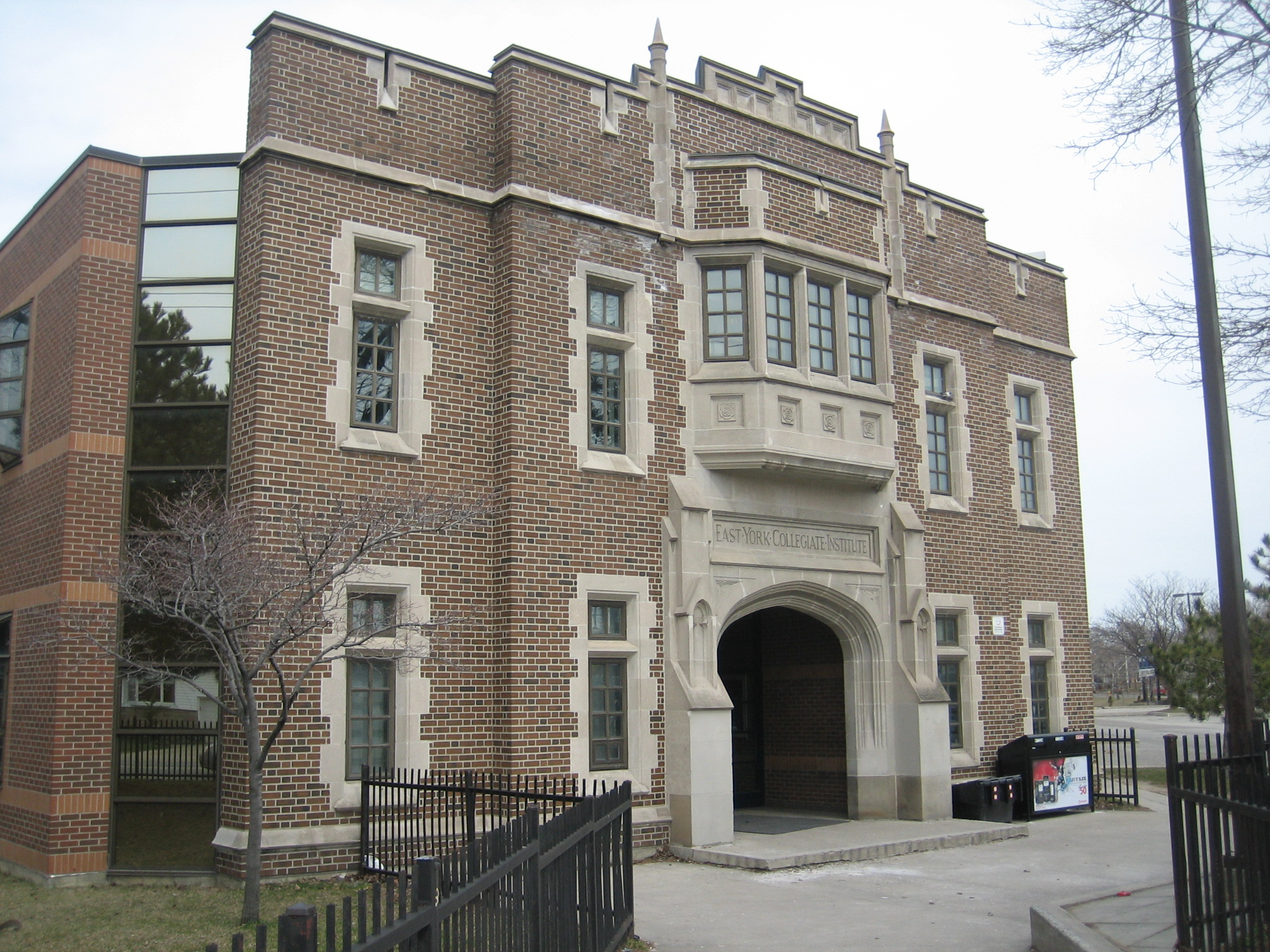
East York Collegiate Institute is one of several public secondary schools located in East York.

Four public school boards provide primary and secondary education for residents of East York, Conseil scolaire catholique MonAvenir (CSCM), Conseil scolaire Viamonde (CSV), the Toronto Catholic District School Board (TCDSB), and the Toronto District School Board (TDSB). CSV and TDSB operate as secular public school boards, the former operating French first language institution, whereas the latter operated English first language institutions. The other two school boards, CSCM and TCDSB, operate as public separate school boards, the former operating French first language separate schools, the latter operating English first language separate schools.

The East York Board of Education was the former authority of English secular schools in East York, until East York was amalgamated into the City of Toronto in 1998. The Metropolitan Separate School Board managed all separate schools (English and French) until 1998, when the school board was reorganized into CSCM and TCDSB.

In addition to primary and secondary education institutions, East York is also home to the Story Arts campus operated by Centennial College, but is set to close by the summer of 2026. The college is a post-secondary institution with campuses located throughout Toronto.

== Government ==
East York is represented by three electoral districts at all three levels of government. The districts are in alphabetical order: Beaches—East York, Don Valley West and Toronto–Danforth.

=== Federal ===
All three Federal electoral districts, are represented by members of the governing Liberal Party of Canada. Beaches—East York has its boundaries go from Lake Ontario in the south, Coxwell Avenue in the west, the Don Valley to the north, with Sunrise Avenue as the most eastern northern terminus, and Victoria Park Avenue in the east. The electoral district is represented by Nathaniel Erskine-Smith. He was the housing minister in prime minister Justin Trudeau's final cabinet, and in prime minister Mark Carney's first cabinet.

Don Valley West includes the northwestern portion of East York, Leaside. Rob Oliphant is the Member of Parliament (MP) in this district.

Toronto—Danforth, which has the Don Valley as most of its northern and western border and goes to the lake, with Coxwell Avenue as its eastern boundary. It is represented by Julie Dabrusin who was appointed as Canada's Environment Minister to serve in prime minister Carney's second cabinet in May 2025.

=== Provincial ===
The province of Ontario used to define most of its provincial electoral districts to align with federal boundaries; no other province does so, and even Ontario maintains a few variances from federal boundaries. However the practice stopped in 2024, when the Ford government did not follow the 2022 Canadian federal electoral redistribution and held the 2025 Ontario general election using the same 2012 Canadian federal electoral redistribution boundaries used in the previous provincial election.

Beaches–East York is represented in the Ontario Legislature by Ontario Liberal Party member Mary-Margaret McMahon. Its boundaries are Lake Ontario in the south, Coxwell Avenue in the west, the Don Valley in the north, including Sunrise Avenue, and Victoria Park Avenue. Since the 2022 Ontario election McMahon has served as the area's Member of Provincial Parliament (MPP).

Don Valley West is represented by Ontario Liberal MPP, Stephanie Bowman. The district includes Leaside, the most north western part of East York.

Toronto–Danforth is represented by Ontario New Democratic Party (ONDP) member Peter Tabuns. The district's southern border is Lake Ontario, the western and northern borders are the Don Valley, and the eastern border is Coxwell Avenue.

=== Municipal ===
The ward boundaries of Toronto City Council also correspond to provincial electoral district boundaries since 2018. They are numbered with the provincial names in brackets.

Ward 19 Beaches—East York is represented on Toronto City Council by councillor Brad Bradford. Ward 15 Don Valley West is represented by councillor Rachel Chernos Lin after she won a by-election to replace deceased councillor Jaye Robinson, the winner in the 2022 Toronto municipal election. Long-time councillor Paula Fletcher represents Ward 14 Toronto—Danforth on Toronto Council.

== Sports ==
East York is home to various sports teams. The hockey teams are the Bulldogs, playing in East York Arena, Victoria Village, playing in Victoria Village arena and the Flames, playing in Leaside Memorial Community Gardens. All three leagues offer co-ed (boys and girls) entry level and competitive select hockey for various ages, being played in the North York Hockey League. The East York Lyndhursts represented the Canada men's national ice hockey team at the 1954 Ice Hockey World Championships.

East York is home to East York Soccer, playing at East York Collegiate, Clairlea Soccer, playing at various locations and the Leaside-East Toronto Soccer Club, playing at Leaside High School and Flemingdon, who offer entry level and competitive soccer for all ages. East York is represented by East York City FC in soccer. East York is home to baseball organizations such as East York and Topham Park. East York provides entry level and AAA baseball for all ages, while Topham Park provides entry level and competitive select softball. East York is home to a provincially known figure skating club, a gymnastics club, a lawn bowling club, and a curling club. East York has a skateboarding community group, Team EY, who collaborated with the local skateboarding community to build the East York Skatepark in 2007.

Leaside Memorial Community Gardens, the largest recreation centre in Leaside, provides an indoor swimming pool, an ice rink, a curling rink and a large auditorium.

== See also ==
- List of people from East York
- List of reeves and mayors of East York
- List of neighbourhoods in East York
