= Warden station =

Toronto subway station

Warden
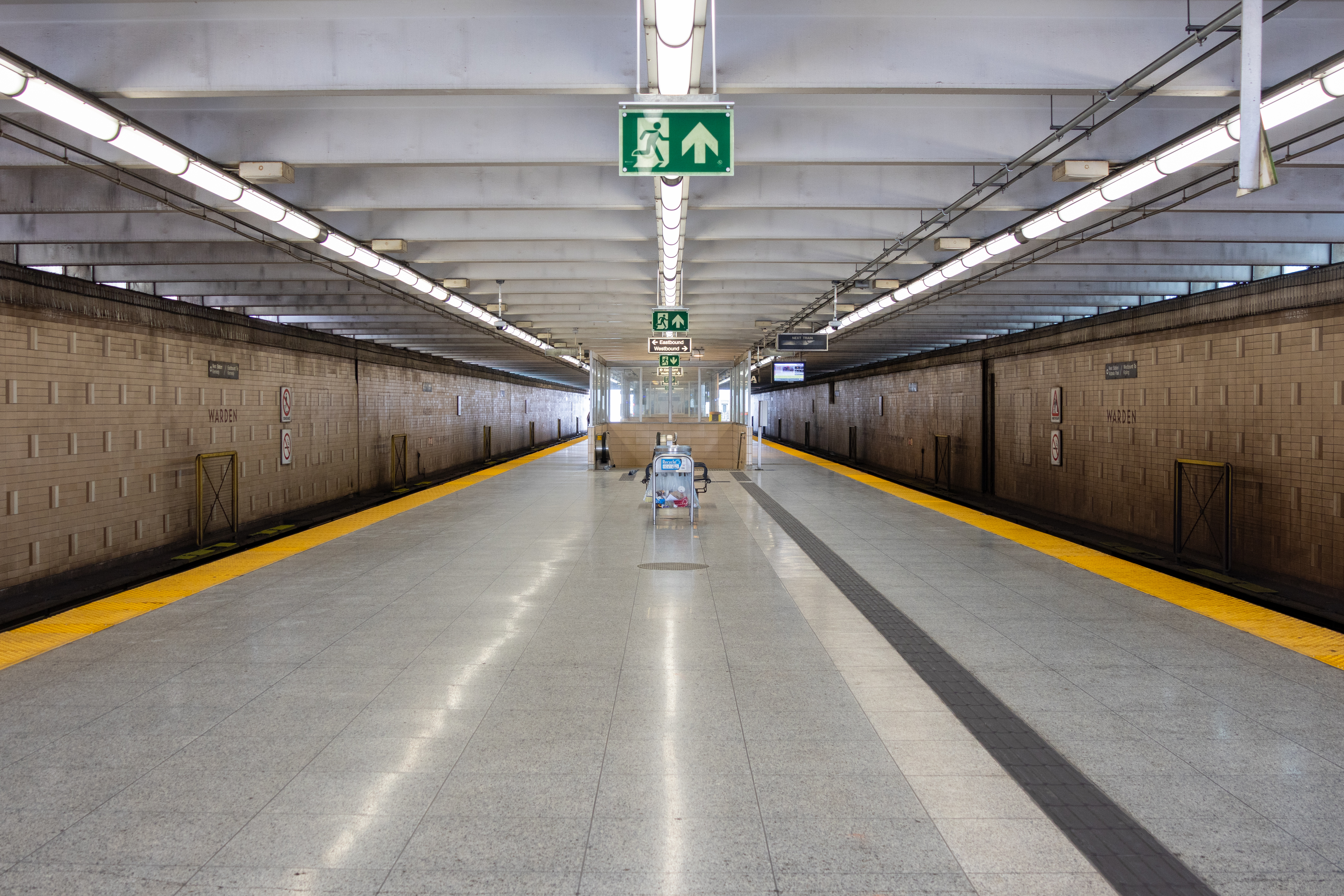

General information
- Location: 701 Warden Avenue, Toronto, Ontario; Canada
- Coordinates: 43°42′40″N 79°16′45″W
- Platforms: Centre platform
- Tracks: 2
- Connections: TTC buses: 8 Broadview; 9 Bellamy; 16 McCowan; 17 Birchmount; 68 Warden; 69 Warden South; 102 Markham Rd; 117 Birchmount South; 135 Gerrard; 902 Markham Road Express; 968 Warden Express

Construction
- Structure type: Elevated
- Parking: 920 spaces
- Accessible: Yes

Other information
- Website: Official station page

History
- Opened: May 10, 1968; 58 years ago

Passengers
- 2023–2024: 21,843
- Rank: 27 of 70

Services
Preceding station	Toronto Transit Commission	Following station
Victoria Park towards Kipling	Line 2 Bloor–Danforth	Kennedy Terminus
Track layout
Location

Warden is a station on Line 2 Bloor–Danforth of the Toronto subway in Toronto, Ontario, Canada. It is located at the southeast corner of St. Clair Avenue East and Warden Avenue. The station is located perpendicular to St. Clair Avenue East, and is the only Line 2 station with a north–south alignment. The station opened in 1968 and was the eastern terminus of the line until 1980.

== Description ==
The station building has three levels: the subway platform is on the upper floor, fare gates and the concourse are found above street level, and the pedestrian entrance is on the lower floor. With the closure of the original bus terminal for reconstruction, a temporary bus terminal has been set up in a former parking lot along Warden Avenue on the east side of the station. There is a passenger pick-up and drop-off area on the temporary terminal's south side. A pedestrian path runs along the west side of the station building connecting St. Clair Avenue and the temporary terminal to the station entrance.

920 parking spaces are located at this station for commuter use, all of them in the North Lot on the north side of St. Clair Avenue.

== History ==
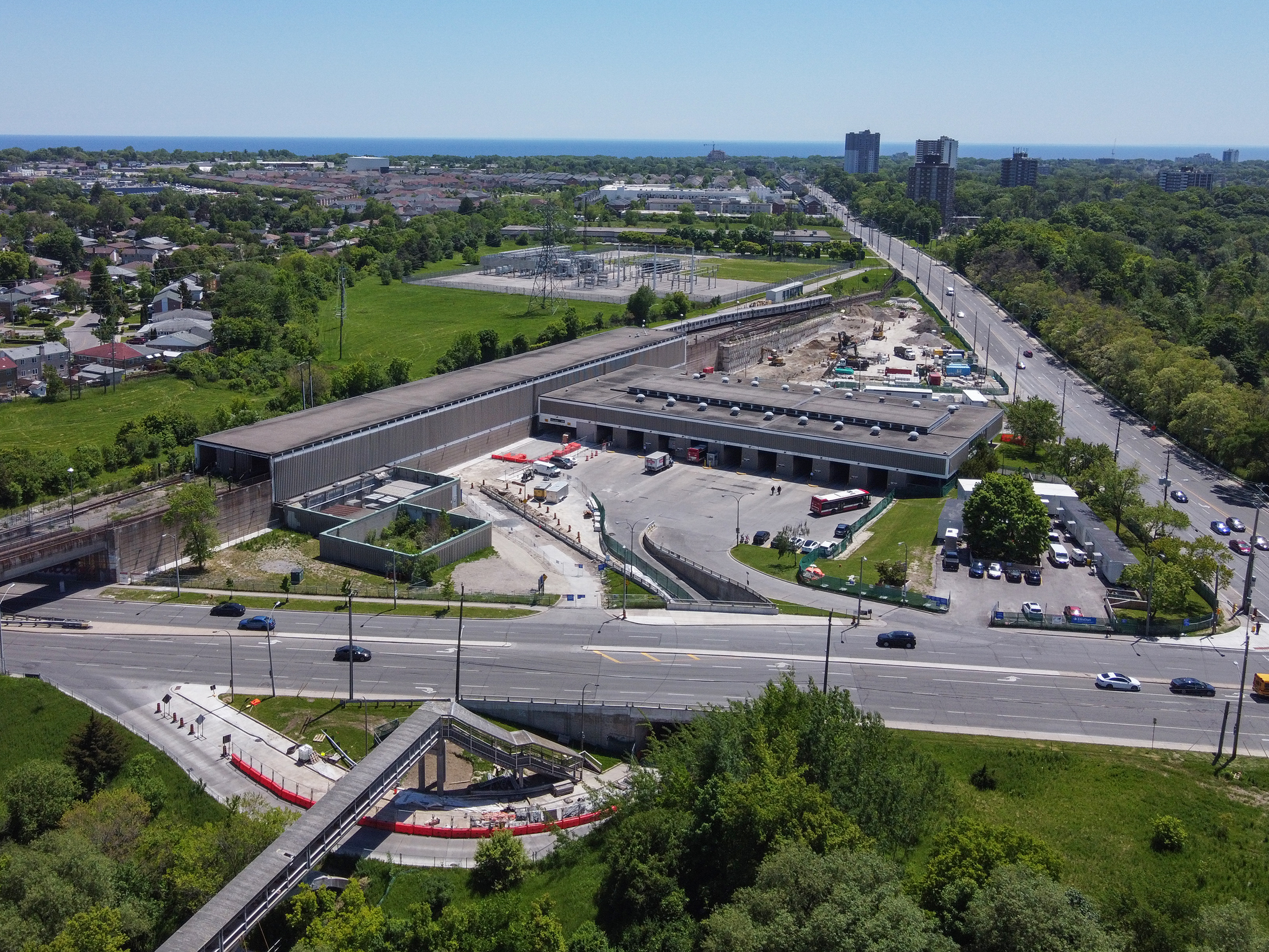
Aerial view before demolition of the original bus terminal

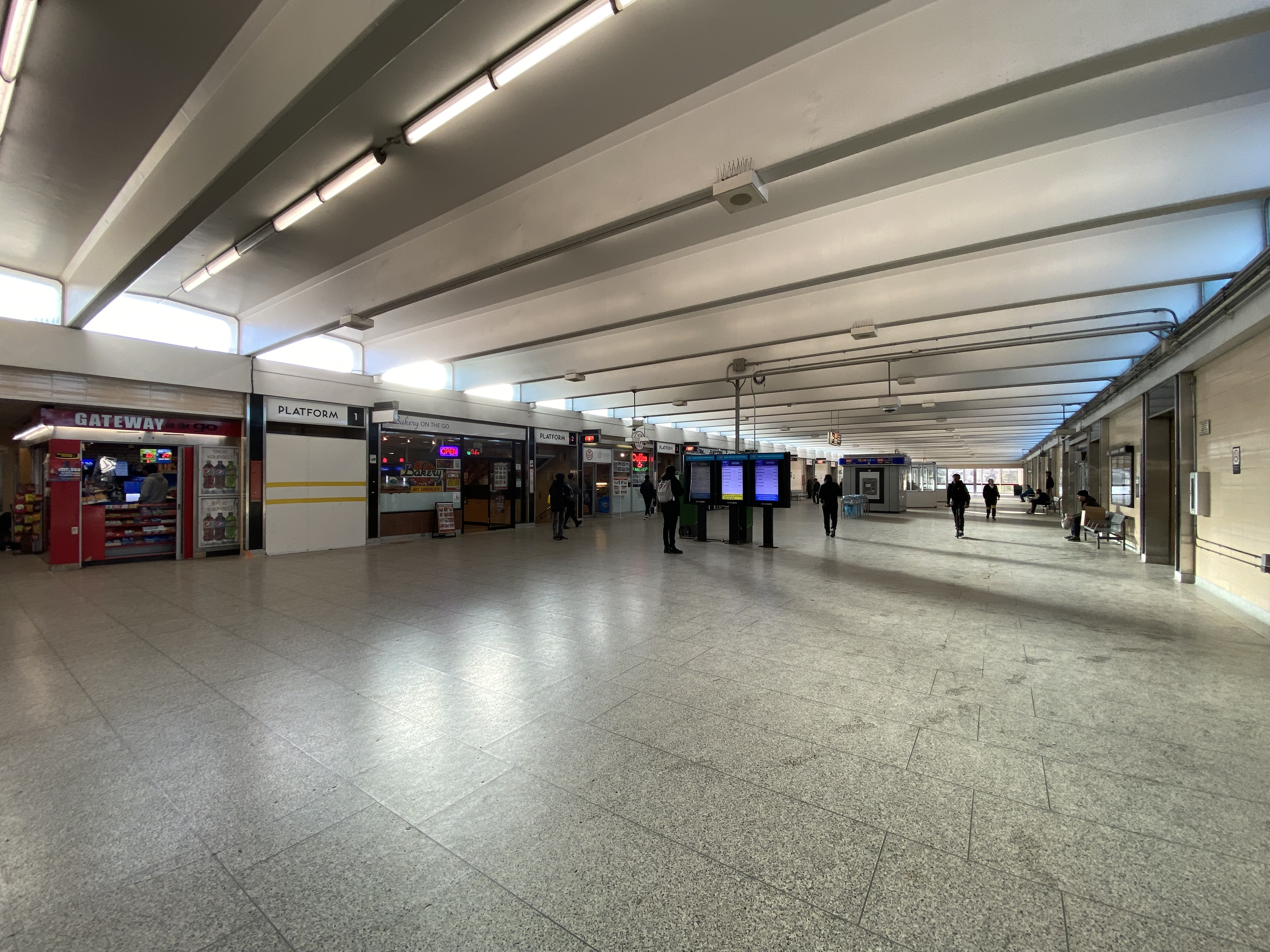
Original bus concourse with entrances to bus platforms

Warden station was opened in 1968 in what was then the Borough of Scarborough, and served as the eastern terminus for Line 2 Bloor–Danforth for 12 years until the extension to Kennedy was completed in 1980.

When the station opened, it had a two-level bus terminal with a concourse on the upper level and nine bus bays at ground level. Each bay had separate stairways for riders to access the concourse, where there would be lighted signs showing the bus route and whether a bus was waiting below on a platform. The concourse had several retail outlets.

Until 1973, TTC buses and subway trains serving the station were in separate fare zones and so the turnstiles and collector booths were placed between the bus bays and the subway platforms. When the zones were abolished, the layout was reconfigured to bring the buses inside the station's fare-paid area; one collector booth, left isolated inside the fare-paid zone, became an information booth.

Work started in 2022 to rebuild the bus terminal and make the station accessible. The station is one of the last subway stations yet to be made accessible, due to the complexity of the station layout and its multiple levels. In November 2023, the south parking lot was closed to convert it into a construction site. A temporary open-air bus terminal opened on January 5, 2025, freeing up the old bus terminal in advance of its demolition and permanent replacement. Elevators within the station were in service by the end of 2025. A new bus terminal is expected to be completed by the end of 2027.

== Future redevelopment ==
Construction of the new bus terminal at Warden station in 2026

A new bus terminal will be built on the site of the original terminal. Designed by Strasman Architects to meet accessibility standards, the new two-level terminal will have 12 street-level bus bays, two elevators, two escalators and space for retail outlets.

Both commuter parking lots at the station are proposed to be redeveloped by the city government. In October 2021, the city announced that agreement had been reached with Tridel to build 600 residential units and a child care centre on the north parking lot.

== Subway infrastructure in the vicinity ==
After exiting the station eastbound towards Kennedy station, the track returns to a tunnel at the Chestnut Portal, where it continues on its diagonal alignment under the former Canadian National Railway (CNR) spur line.

There is a crossover west of the station from when it was Line 2's eastern terminus which is still used occasionally to short turn trains. There is also a small siding and storage shed west of the crossover on the south side of the above-ground tracks, which continue along the track bed of the former CNR line all the way to Victoria Park station.

== Nearby landmarks ==
Nearby landmarks include the Providence Healthcare, Warden Woods Park, Warden Hilltop Community Centre and Pine Hills Cemetery. It is near much vacant industrial land (including the former site of Centennial College and Warden Woods Mall/Power Centre) where major redevelopment is expected over the coming years, including numerous new housing developments on the former Power Centre property. It is also near the Toronto District School Board high school WA Porter CI, which brings about 700 students into the station each year.

== Surface connections ==
The temporary bus terminal, opened on January 5, 2025, is accessible to those with disabilities. It is located on the east side of Warden Avenue, south of St. Clair Avenue. The bus bays are numbered 1 to 8 from south to north. Four of the bays (1, 6, 7, 8) are located on the east curb of Warden Avenue. The other four bays (2, 3, 4, 5) are located in an adjacent, former parking lot. The temporary bus terminal is outside of the station's fare-paid area.

TTC routes serving the station include:

Bay number	Route	Name	Additional information
1	117	Birchmount South	Southbound to Victoria Park station
2			Layover Spot
3	8	Broadview	Southbound to Hennick Bridgepoint Hospital via O'Connor Drive and Broadview station
3	17A	Brichmount	Northbound to Highway 7 via Birchmount station
3	17B	Brichmount	Northbound to Steeles Avenue East via Birchmount station and Wintermute Boulevard
3	17C	Brichmount	Northbound to Steeles Avenue East and Warden Avenue via Birchmount station
4	69	Warden South	Southbound to St. Clair Avenue East (Barkdene Hills)
4	135	Gerrard	Westbound to Main Street station
5	9	Bellamy	Northbound to Scarborough Centre station
5	16	McCowan	Northbound to Scarborough Centre station
6	Line 2	Shuttle Bus	Westbound
7	102A	Markham Road	Northbound to Progress Avenue / Centennial College
7	102B	Markham Road	Northbound to Steeles Avenue East
7	102C	Markham Road	Northbound to Steeles Avenue East via Dynamic Drive
7	102D	Markham Road	Northbound to Major Mackenzie Drive
7	902	Markham Road Express	Northbound to Steeles Avenue East via Centennial College
8	68A	Warden	Northbound to Steeles Avenue East via Golden Mile station
8	68B	Warden	Northbound to Major Mackenzie Drive via Golden Mile station
8	968	Warden Express	Northbound to Steeles Avenue East via Golden Mile station (Rush hour service)
8	Line 2	Shuttle bus	Eastbound
