= Leaside =

- Neighbourhood
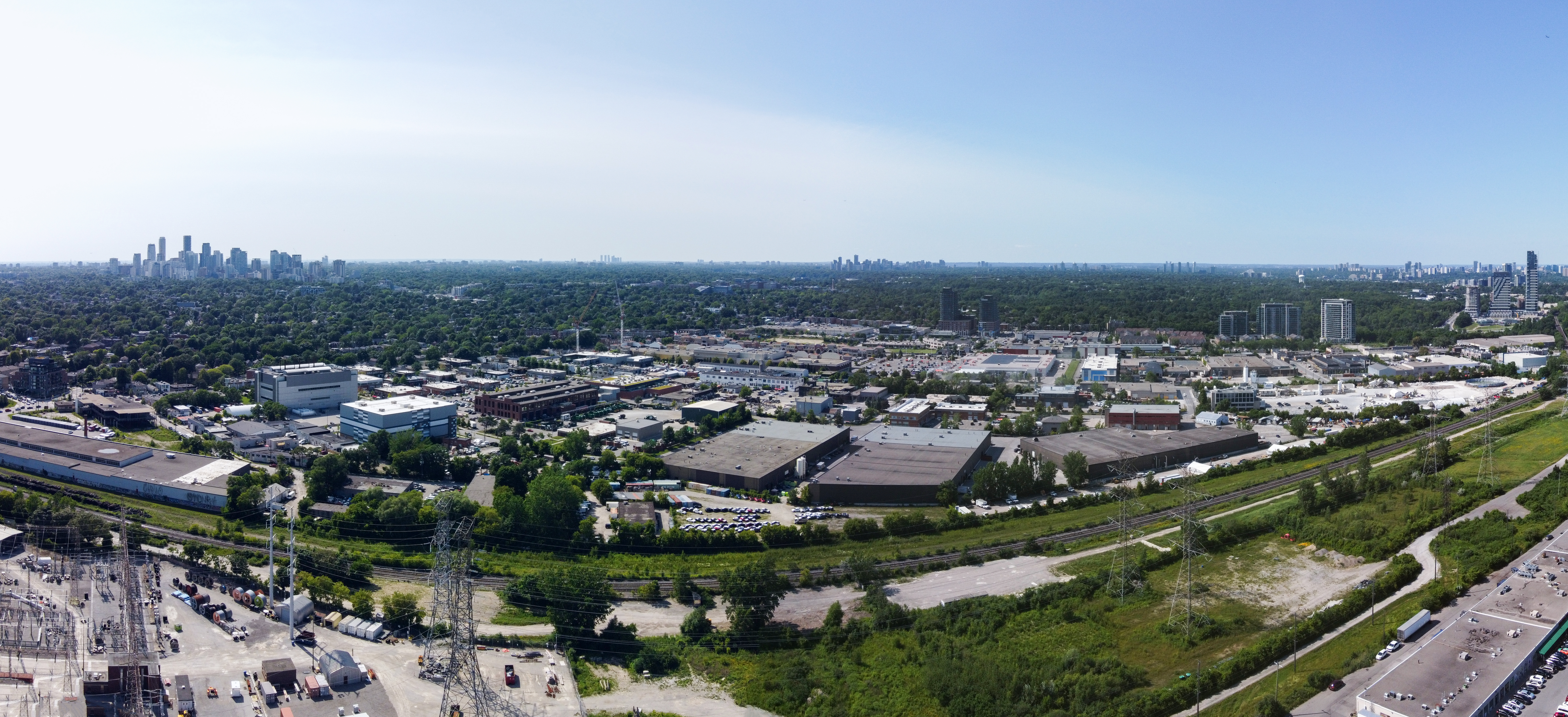
- Aerial view of Leaside in 2023
- Motto: Itineris Stabilitas Sanitas
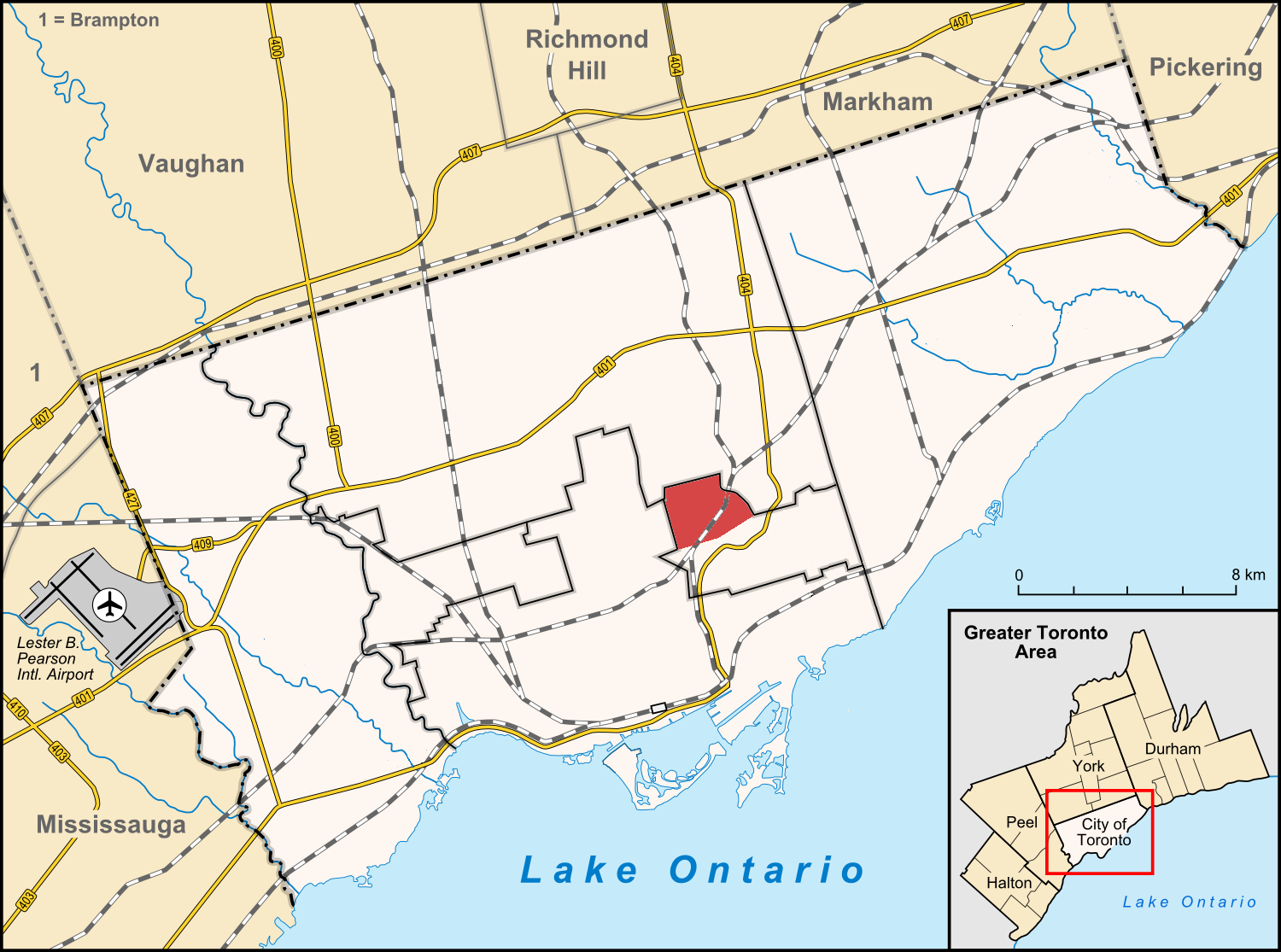
- Location of Leaside in Toronto
- Coordinates: 43°42′00″N 79°22′00″W
- Country: Canada
- Province: Ontario
- City: Toronto
- Established: 1880s (Postal village)
- Incorporated: April 23, 1913 (Town)
- Changed Region: 1953 Metropolitan Toronto from York County
- Changed Municipality: 1967 East York from Leaside
- Changed Municipality: 1998 Toronto from East York

Government
  - MP: Rob Oliphant (Don Valley West)
  - MPP: Stephanie Bowman (Don Valley West)
  - Mayor: Olivia Chow (City of Toronto)
  - Councillor: Rachel Chernos Lin (Don Valley West)
- Time zone: UTC-5 (EST)
  - Summer (DST): UTC-4 (EDT)
- Postal code span: M4G
- Area codes: 416, 647, 437, 942

Leaside (/'liːˌsaɪd/) is a neighbourhood in Toronto, Ontario, Canada. It is located northeast of Downtown Toronto, in the vicinity of Eglinton Avenue East and Bayview Avenue. It is one of the most expensive and exclusive neighbourhoods in the city. The area takes its name from William Lea and the Lea family, who settled there in the early years of the 19th century. The area first developed as farmland along with Toronto through the 19th century. It was incorporated as a town in 1913. In 1967, it amalgamated with the township of East York to form the borough of East York. In 1998, it became part of the city of Toronto.

== History ==
=== Early history ===
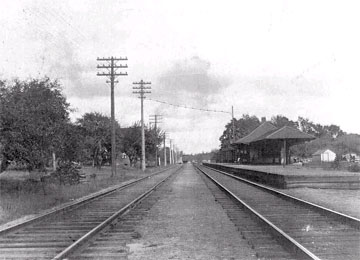
Original Leaside railway station in 1899. The station was completed in 1894 by Canadian Pacific Railway.

John Lea Sr. was born in 1773 in Lancashire and immigrated to York, Upper Canada in 1819, coming from Philadelphia in the United States where they immigrated to in 1818. Before immigrating, he married Mary Hutchison (born in Cumberland) and they had their first child in Lanchester on May 28, 1814 and named him William Lea. He purchased Lot 13 in the third concession from Alexander McDonnell on January 23, 1820 and settled there with his family. John Lea Sr. had three children - William, John Jr. and Mary. In 1851, William Lea bought land just south of his father's farm, and began constructing a large, octagonal brick house, which he named "Leaside". The house was completed in 1854, the same year John Lea Sr. died, aged 81. The building served not only as a home and court house for William Lea's family, but after he became a Magistrate in the County of York, soon served as a residence, a town hall and a post office as well. The property became the possession of William's eldest son Joseph upon his death in 1893. Joseph lived in the octagonal house until 1903. Afterwards, it was abandoned and later demolished by the Canadian Northern Railway in 1913. The company later set fire to the old landmark in order to clear the land to make way for the company's proposed sidings and townsite.

In the 1870s, the Ontario and Quebec Railway Company purchased a few acres (hectares) of land on the south-east corner of William Lea's property to run its railway across. The Ontario and Quebec Railway Company encountered financial difficulties in 1884, and leased part of its railway, including the section of track running through Leaside, to the Canadian Pacific Railway for 999 years. The Canadian Pacific Railway decided to establish a maintenance stop and a sliding by-pass on the railway on the land purchased from William Lea, which was considered attractive because it was uniformly flat. The station was completed in September 1894 and named "Leaside" in honour of William Lea. In 1892, a junction was built in the Leaside area, and a railway line named the Don Branch was constructed south along the Don River towards the original Union Station on Toronto's waterfront.

=== Development of a model town ===
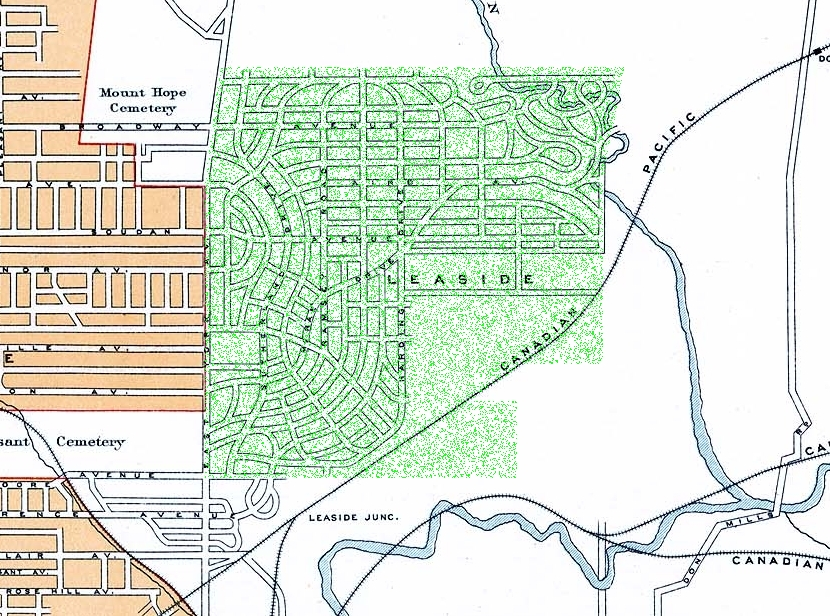
Road map of Leaside (highlighted in green) in 1915. A planned community was developed around the railway's maintenance yard in the early 20th century.

In 1912, William Mackenzie and Donald Mann, the owners of the Canadian Northern Railway, hired landscape architect Frederick Todd to plan development for a community to be built around a maintenance yard for their railway, which ran beside the CP lines through the Leaside area. Mackenzie and Todd founded the York Land Company to purchase land for such a town. The company purchased 4.0 square kilometres (1,000 acres), including most of the third concession and some land north of Eglinton Avenue. The purchased lands extended from the railway tracks in the south to three farms north of Eglinton Avenue, from Leslie Street in the east to Bayview Avenue in the west. The town of Leaside was planned by Todd for the company, which put its name to many of the local streets; Laird Drive, Hanna Road, and Wicksteed Avenue all bear the name of Canadian Northern Railway company executives. The new community was planned with commercial areas, residential areas, and a town centre west of Laird Drive, and space was laid out east of Laird Drive for industrial development. The goal of the company was to create Leaside as a new upper class residential area of Toronto, the "New Rosedale". The developers first approached the town of North Toronto, hoping that North Toronto would annex the area and provide services such as streets, sewers, and public transportation. The town council of North Toronto refused. A similar request to the city of Toronto was met with a similar reply. With their attempts to include Leaside within another city or town rebuffed, Colonel Davidson and Randolph McRae applied to the province of Ontario to incorporate Leaside as a town.

The Town of Leaside was officially incorporated on April 23, 1913. The population of Leaside was 43. The Canadian Northern Railway company approved Todd's town plan on May 8, 1913. A town council for Leaside was elected on May 8, 1913 and they approved the plan for the town on May 21, 1913, which was the final legal approval needed before the plan could be implemented. On June 21, 1913, the Toronto World carried the announcement that properties in Leaside's planned community would be marked in the fall of that year. In September 1913, lots went on sale within the planned community.

In 1914, the industrial area that had been set aside east of Laird Drive received its first tenant. Canada Wire and Cable began construction of a factory for production of 9.2 inch shells for World War I. In addition to the new factory, Canada Wire and Cable moved their other Toronto production plants to the same location to increase efficiency. Canada Wire and Cable also created the subsidiary company Leaside Munitions Company to oversee shell production. Soon after, construction began on a federal government owned airstrip, named Leaside Aerodrome. The York Land Company leased about 0.9 square kilometres (220 acres) to the government for the airfield, between Wicksteed Avenue and Eglinton Avenue. On May 21, 1917 construction began on the airfield. At the close of the war, there were accommodations for around 1000 military personnel.

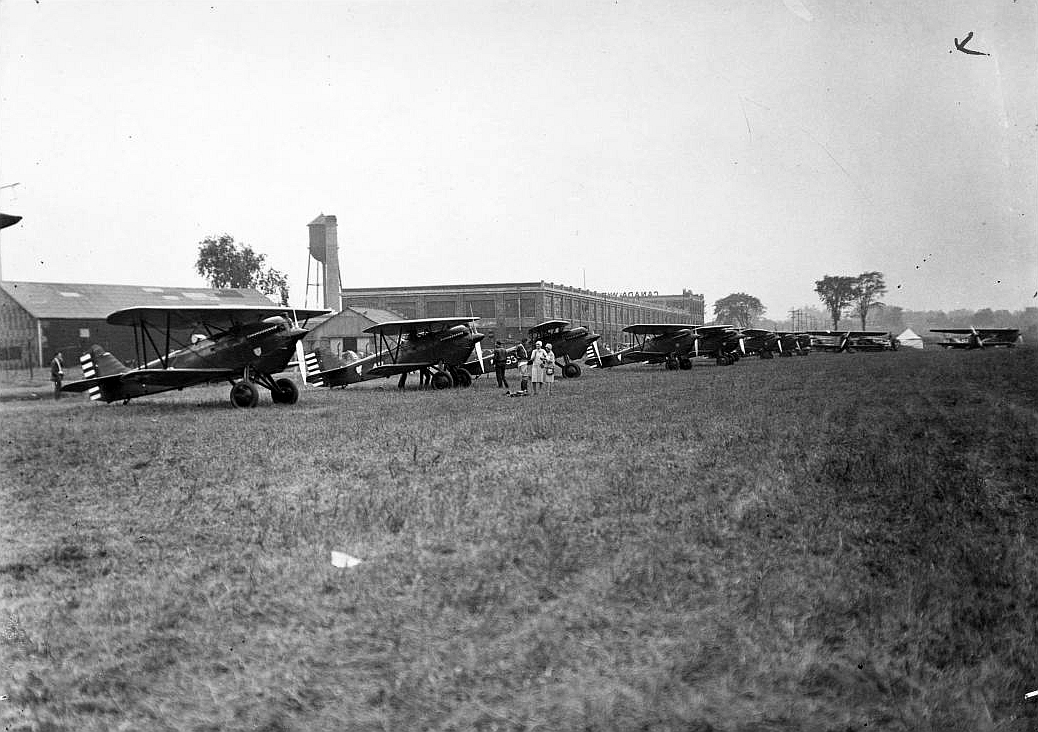
Members of the Toronto Flight Club prepare to take-off from Leaside Aerodrome, 1930. The Aerodrome was operated from 1917 to 1944.

While the industrial development in the area went ahead as planned during World War One, the anticipated residential development did not occur. As late as 1929 the population remained under 500. World War I spurred the demand for industrial output but diminished the call for new housing. The bankruptcy of Canadian Northern Railway left the project at a loss and Leaside's isolated location made it unappealing to workers from Toronto.

=== Growth as a suburb of Toronto ===
Federal census population history of Leaside
Year	Pop.	±%
1921	325	—
1931	938	+188.6%
1941	6,183	+559.2%
1951	16,233	+162.5%
1956	16,538	+1.9%
1961	18,579	+12.3%
1966	21,250	+14.4%
Source: Statistics Canada

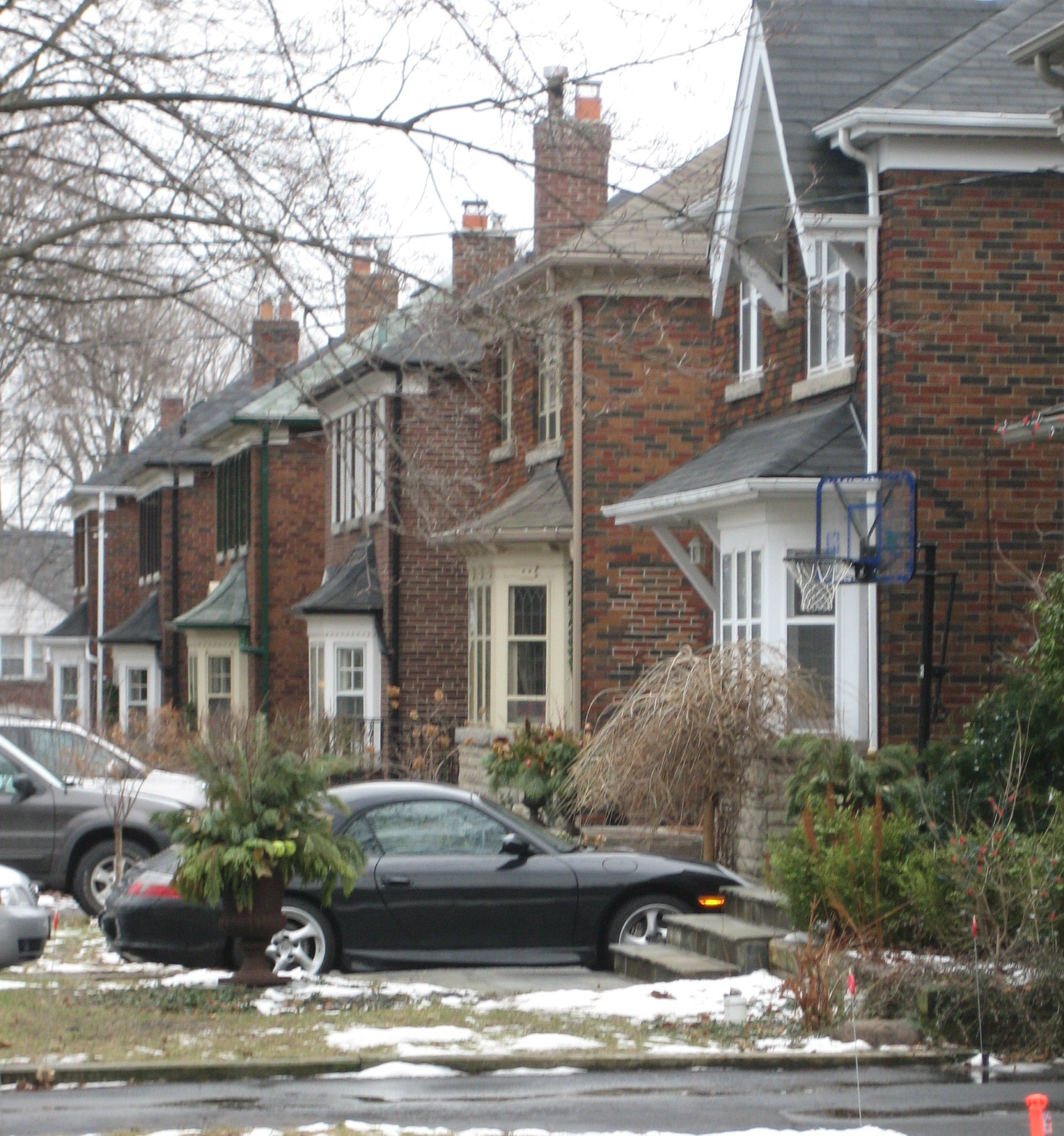
Homes in Leaside

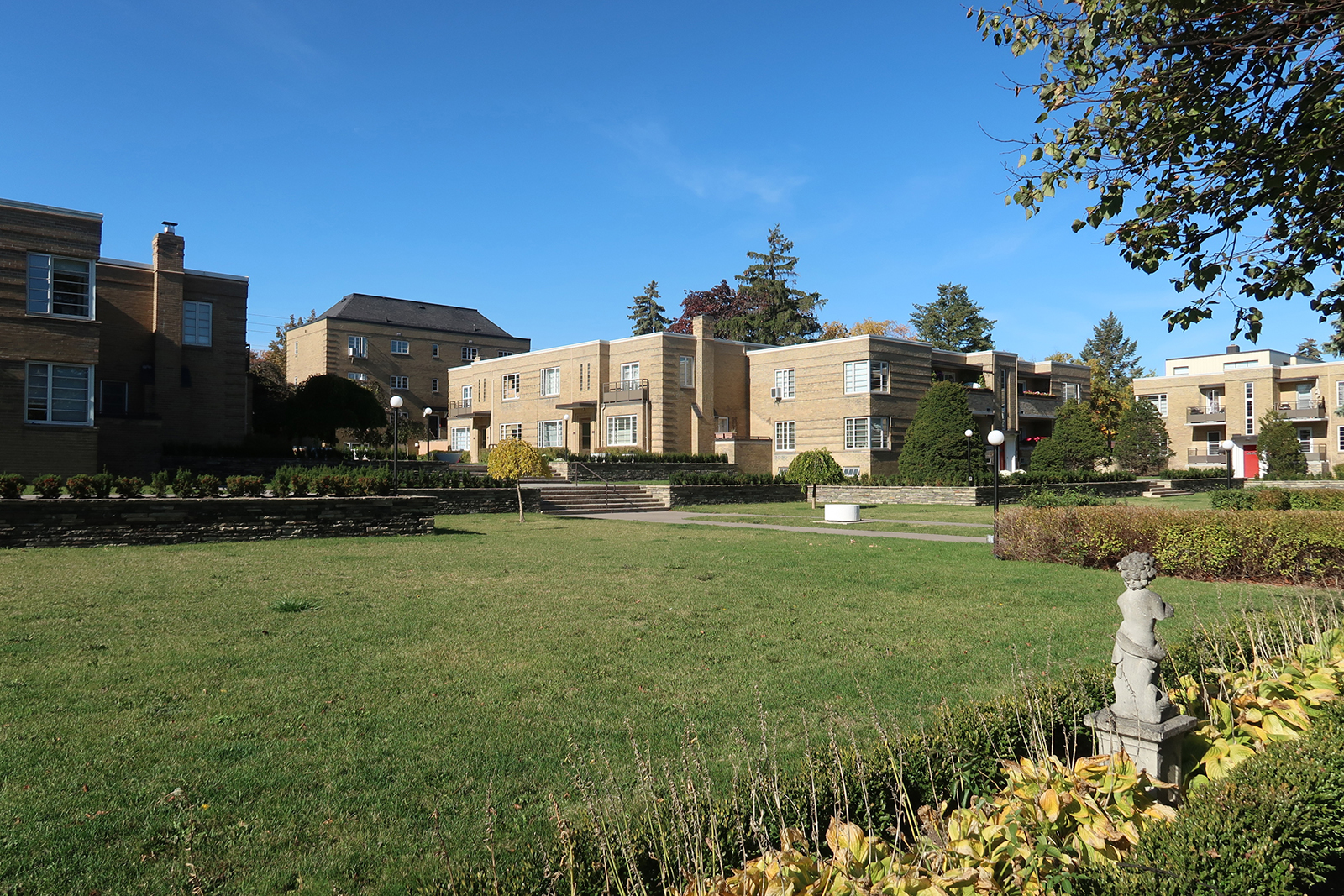
Garden Court Apartments built between 1939 and 1941, designed by Forsey Page & Steele

After the war, the airstrip became the site of Canada’s first airmail delivery on June 18, 1918, when pilot Brian Peck flew 120 letters from Montreal to Toronto. The flight was initially arranged by friends in Montreal who wanted letters delivered by air. When Canada Post learned of the plan, it collected the letters and treated the delivery as an early test of an airmail system.

Following the war, demand for shells and other military supplies declined, and the factories of the Leaside Munition Company were closed. The buildings were soon taken over by the Durant Motor Company, which produced Durant and Star automobiles, as well as the Rugby truck.

Leaside's growth slowed after World War I, with its primary industry being war industry. The existing houses had all been built for employees of the Leaside Munitions Company by the company. However, at this time Leaside stood on the edge of Toronto and was increasingly an appealing place for investment. Investors from Baltimore bought property that had previously belonged to Robert T. Davies for the construction of a race track. They formed the Thorncliffe Park Racing and Breeding Association Ltd. to operate the track.

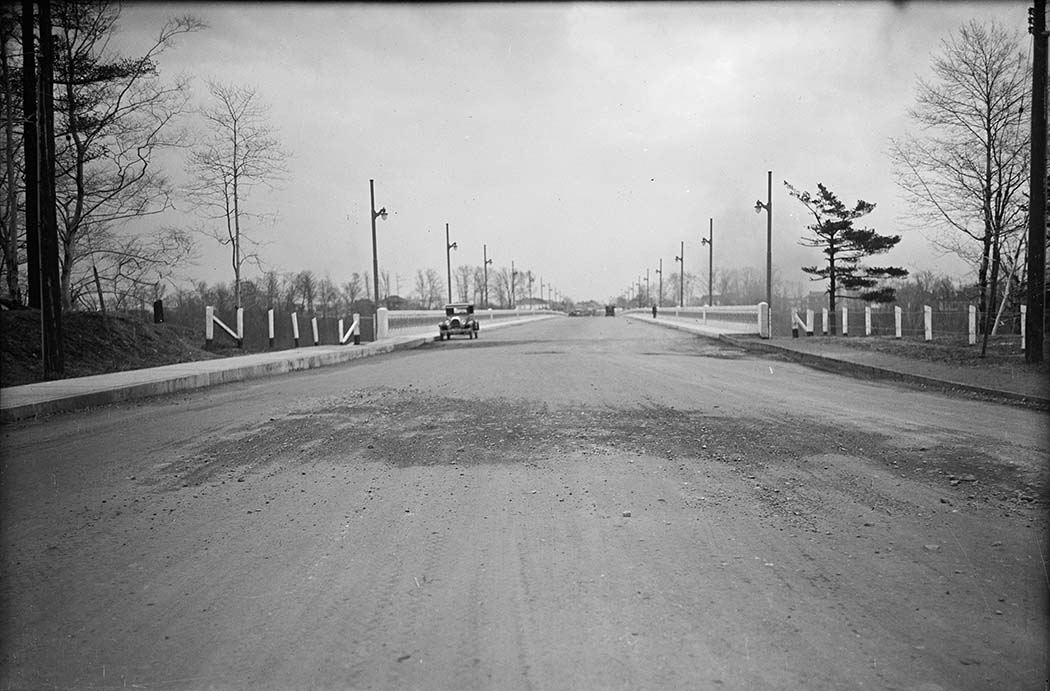
Street view of Leaside Viaduct in April 1928, nearly six months after its official opening.

The Leaside Viaduct was completed on October 29, 1927, providing easy connection between east Toronto and Leaside. This led to the rapid growth of Leaside at the time, and in the future. The impassibility of the Don River valley had previously made it difficult for people employed in Toronto to reside in Leaside. The same month, an underpass on Millwood Road was opened through the valley.

In 1928, the Lincoln Electric Company of Canada Ltd. relocated from Toronto's west end to Leaside. The company originally sold Lincoln motors in Canada, but incorporated in 1930 and began the manufacture of motors in Leaside. At the onset of the Great Depression, the Durant Motor Company ran into financial troubles. The last cars were produced in 1933, and the buildings were occupied by the Canada Wire and Cable company.

At the start of World War II, Lincoln Electric moved their operations to Leaside industrial park, adjacent to the Canada Wire and Cable plant. The new location, constructed in 1940, covered 28 square metres (300 sq ft). On July 16, 1940, Research Enterprises Limited was incorporated. The company operated only during the war, closing in 1946. It was, however, the largest single employer in Leaside's history, employing over 7500 men and women at its peak. The site manufactured military radio equipment and optical supplies, with a total value of $220 million (CDN) in goods produced during the war.

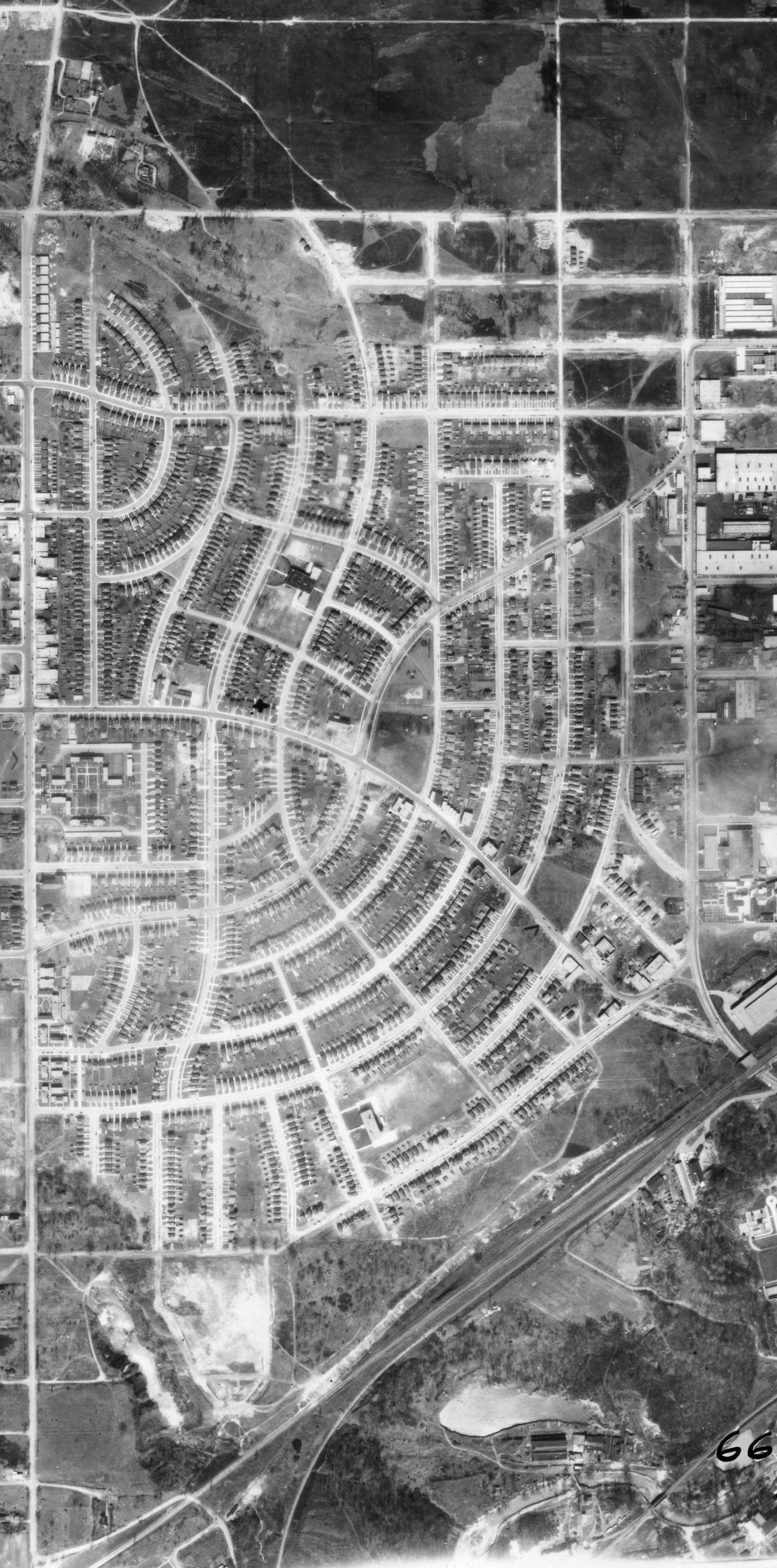
Aerial photograph of Leaside, 1942. During the Second World War, the area was home to several industrial operations.

As part of a Royal Canadian Air Force public relations plan, the town of Leaside officially "adopted" No. 432 Squadron RCAF of No. 6 Group RCAF. Formed and adopted on 1 May 1943, the squadron took the town's name as its nickname, becoming 432 "Leaside" squadron RCAF. The sponsorship lasted the duration of the war.

In 1945, at the end of World War II, the population of Leaside stood at 9,800. In 1949, Leaside's population had grown to 14,826.

On May 14, 1952, the Sunnybrook Plaza, located on the north-east corner of Bayview Avenue and Eglinton Avenue East, became one of the first shopping centres in Toronto. The site was previously a marsh where people dug loam for their gardens.

In 1952 the Lincoln Electric company expanded to a 2,200-square-foot (200 m^{2}) plant, and their site expanded to cover almost 2.8 hectares (7 acres). They leased an additional 500-square-foot (46 m^{2}) building in Leaside to house their distribution center.

The last horse race at Thorncliffe Park was run on June 23, 1952. Investors from Toronto bought the racetrack that year.

The rapid growth of Thorncliffe in the 1950s necessitated the construction of a second north–south bridge across the Don Valley. In 1955, Leaside's population had grown to 16,779 and the Leaside town council approved the second bridge. Construction of the bridge was completed on September 7, 1960 and it was opened by Leslie Frost. The bridge was named the Charles Hiscott Bridge in honour of Leaside's mayor at the time.

=== Amalgamation and recent history ===
In 1967, Leaside was amalgamated with the Township of East York, forming the Borough of East York and becoming a neighbourhood within the new municipality. East York later merged with five other municipalities in 1998 to create the City of Toronto.

Over the following decades, several transportation and industrial facilities that had once played prominent roles in Leaside’s development were closed. Passenger service to Leaside Station ended in 1970, and the station was shut down shortly afterward. It briefly reopened in the 1980s as a restaurant but did not return to passenger use. Leaside Airport also fell into disuse, and the last remaining hangar was demolished in 1971.

Industrial changes continued in the 1990s. Canada Wire and Cable, long one of Leaside’s largest employers, was acquired by Alcatel in 1991. Manufacturing operations were relocated to Markham in 1996, and the former plant site was later redeveloped as a shopping centre. At its peak, the facility employed more than 2,700 workers and supported local infrastructure, including the construction of a water main in 1918.

In the 21st century, major transit investment returned to the area. Line 5 Eglinton, also known as the Eglinton Crosstown LRT, opened in 2026 serving Leaside with three stations.

== Geography ==
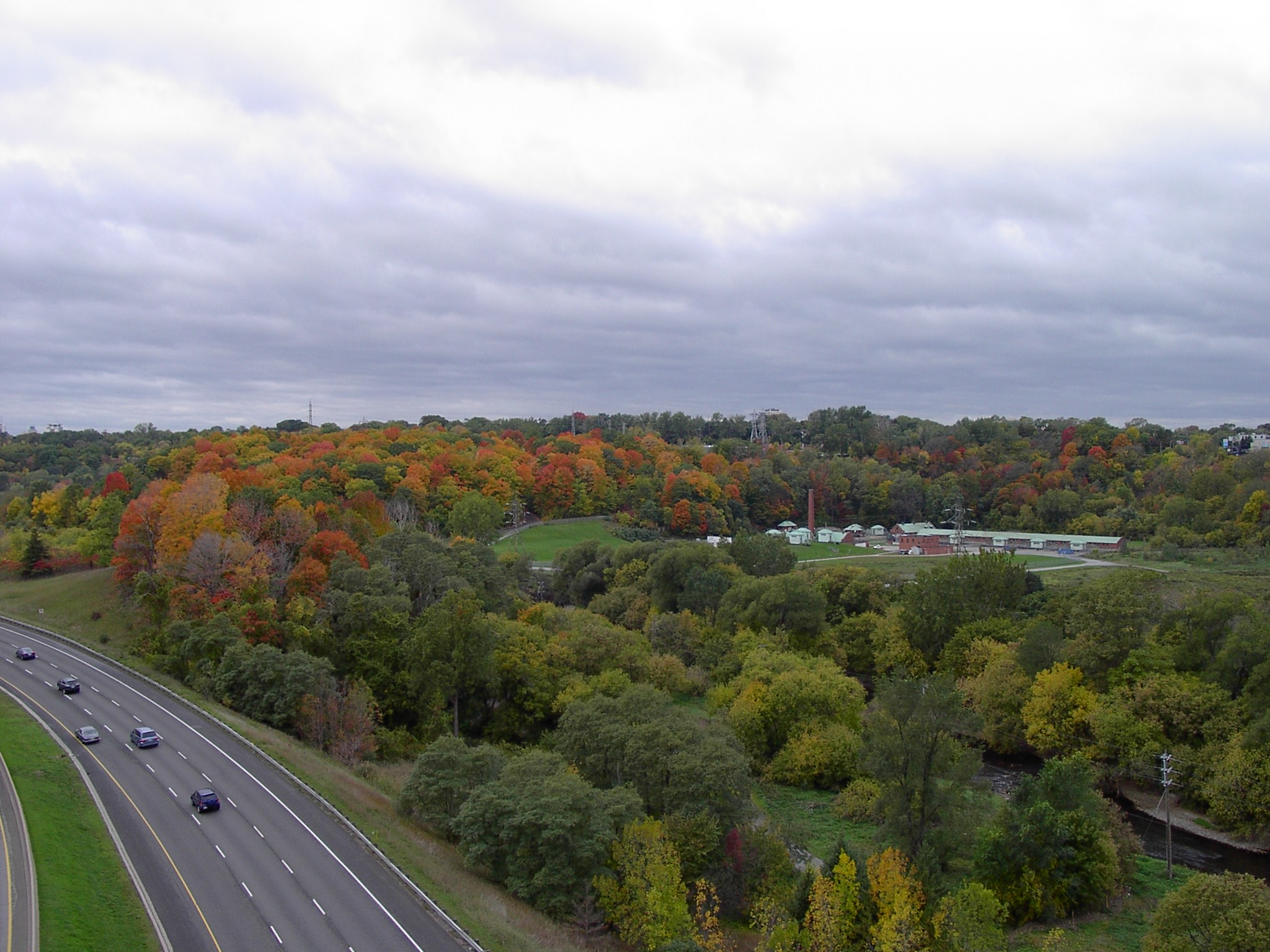
Crothers Woods is a local park that is a part of the Toronto ravine system and sits south of Leaside. The neighbourhood is situated on the Iroquois Plains around the ravine system.

Leaside lies on the Iroquois Plain. The actions of the glacial Lake Iroquois made the Leaside area into a flat plateau, surrounded on three sides by deep river valleys.

== Culture ==
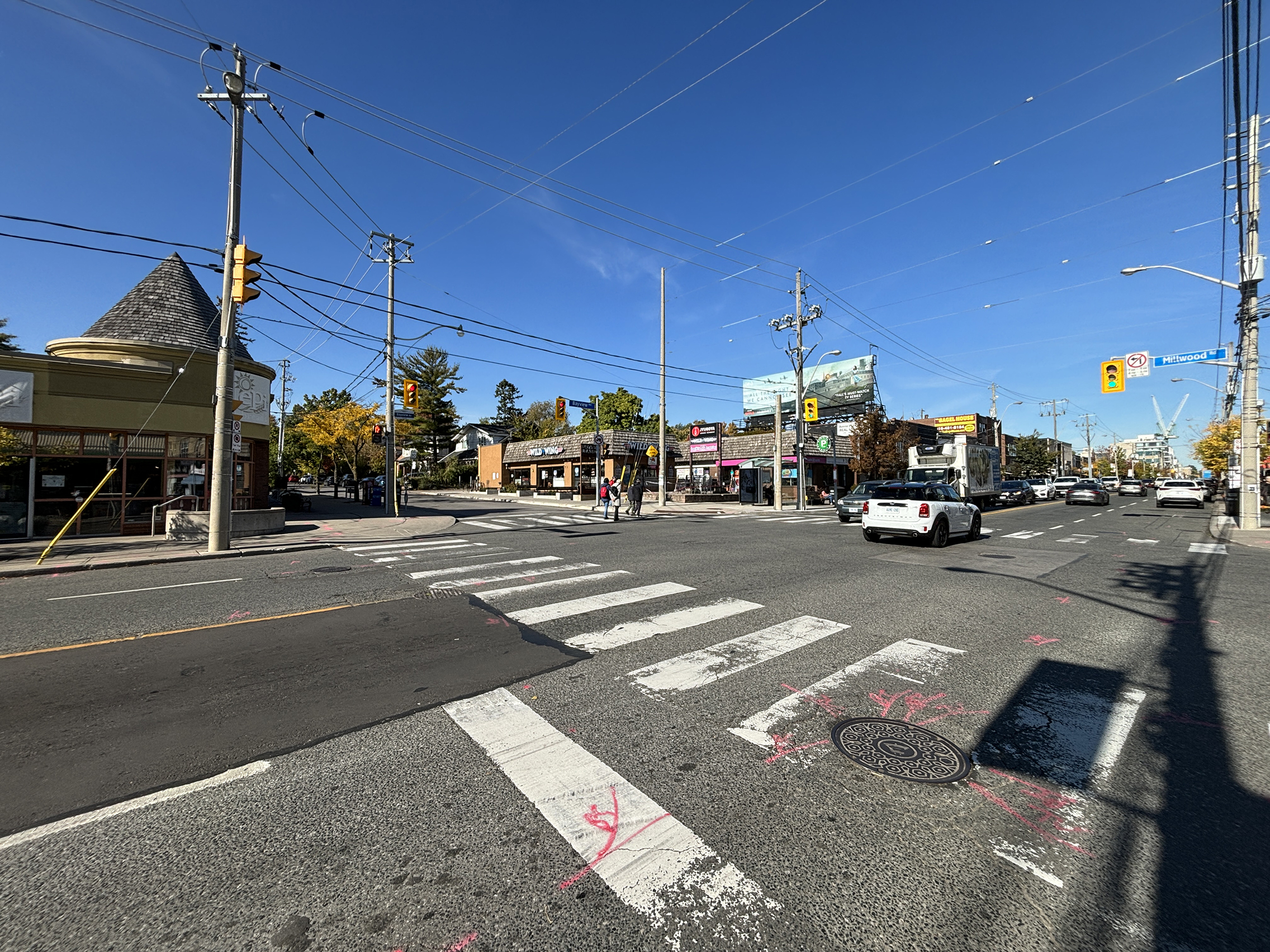
View of the west side of Bayview Avenue at Millwood Road in 2023

Leaside is made up predominantly of single-family homes housing upper-middle-class families. The most famous house in Leaside is James Lea's, located at 201 Sutherland Drive. Built in 1909, it is unique in that the back of the house faces Sutherland Drive. It was originally built to face James Lea Lane, a street that no longer exists.

=== Recreation ===
The largest recreation centre in Leaside is Leaside Memorial Community Gardens which includes an indoor swimming pool, two ice rinks, a curling rink, and a large auditorium.

Serena Gundy Park is in the north-east corner of Leaside. The parkland was donated to Leaside in 1960 by the estate of James H. Gundy. The park covers 25.3 hectares (62.6 acres) which are generally in a natural state. The park is used for picnicking and hiking in the summer and cross country skiing in the winter. The park is also connected by walking paths to Sunnybrook Park.

Trace Manes Park is in south Leaside. The park is home to the Leaside Tennis club and sports six tennis courts. Other facilities in the park include a playground, a baseball diamond, and an outdoor ice rink in winter.

Howard Talbot Park in south-west Leaside features two baseball diamonds. Additionally it features a "splash pad", a water playground for young children.

== Education ==
Northlea Elementary and Middle School is located on the site of the old Divadale Estate on Rumsey Road north of Eglinton Avenue. It was opened in 1944 and had 15 classrooms. In 1991–93, the school underwent extensive renovations and the school now educates over 800 students. The renovation provided additional classroom space to the school as well as a new library, and second gymnasium. The playing field is artificial turf. The school is operated by the Toronto District School Board. Northlea is a dual track school offering regular English programs from Junior Kindergarten to Grade 8, and French Immersion programs from Senior Kindergarten to Grade 8. Northlea welcomes commuters for the impressive French Immersion programs.

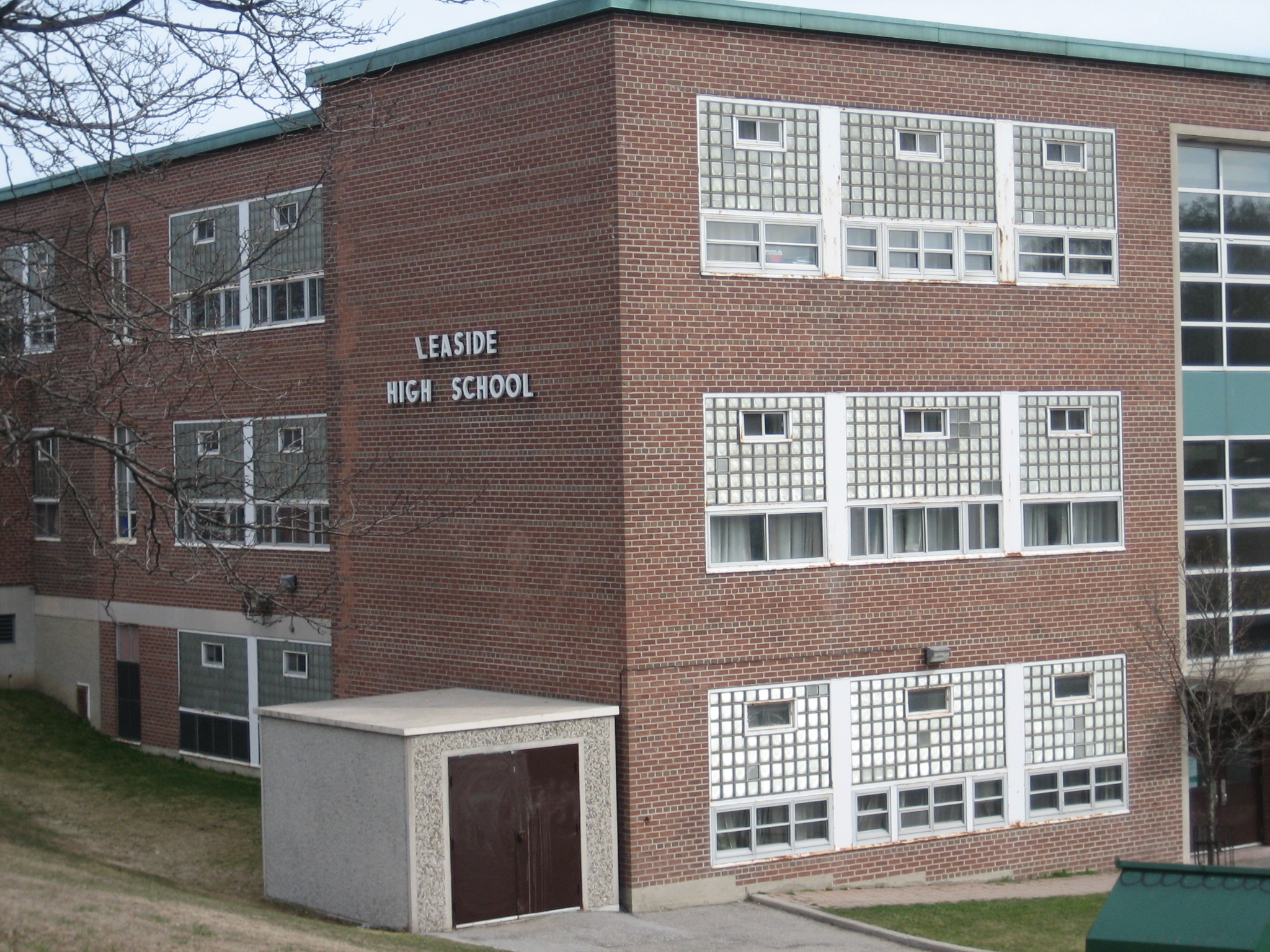
Opened in 1945, Leaside High School is a secular English public secondary school operated by the Toronto District School Board.

Bessborough Elementary and Middle School, located close to Leaside High School in South Leaside, has offered education to those living in the older part of Leaside. St. Anselm Catholic School, also located on Bessborough Drive, opened in 1939 and presently has an enrollment of 340 students from Junior Kindergarten to Grade 8.

Rolph Road Elementary School, an elementary school for junior kindergarten to grade 6, is the other elementary school in the neighbourhood. Located on Rolph Road, it is in South Leaside and is a feeder school to Bessborough.

Leaside High School began on the top floor of Rolph Road School in 1945. The "new" high school opened in September 1948 and welcomed back local students who had been attending Lawrence Park and Jarvis Collegiate.

Along with the growth of these schools in the 1940s and 1950s, the growing population of Leaside also supported one of North Toronto's first preschools. Sunnybrook School was founded in 1952 in the basement of St. Augustine of Canterbury Church in Leaside. In 1960 the school moved to its present 469 Merton Street location, just west of Leaside in Davisville.

In addition to the Toronto District School Board, three other public school boards also operate in the city. The Toronto Catholic District School Board (TCDSB), is a public English separate school board; Conseil scolaire Viamonde is a secular French public school board; and the Conseil scolaire de district catholique Centre-Sud is a French separate public school board. However, the French school boards do not operate a school in the Leaside neighbourhood.

St. Anselm Catholic School is a coeducational, Catholic, elementary school in the south of Toronto, Ontario. It was named after the philosopher and theologian of Canterbury, Saint Anselm. It was established in 1939, with only 2 classrooms under principal Mary Breen. Additions to the school were made in 1943, 1947 and 1951. The library and gymnasium were added in 1966. Today the school serves students from Kindergarten to 8th grade. In 1997, the MSSB/TCDSB made funds for the school to be a two-story building. When the school was being renovated, the students were moved to 1107 Avenue Road, which is now Marshall McLuhan. The students came back to the newly renovated school in 1998.

Bloorview School Authority is an educational facility physically located within the Holland Bloorview Kids Rehabilitation Hospital in north Leaside, although they are each separate legal entities. The Bloorview School Authority offers various educational programs for children, some of whom are patients in the hospital. Included in the offerings is a full day program for children from junior kindergarten to grade one, based on Ontario school curriculum.

== Politics ==
The first town council for Leaside was elected on May 8, 1913. The council had five members: Randolph McRae, who served as the mayor, and Harvey Fitzsimmons, Laurence Boulton, George Saunders and Archibald McRae who served as aldermen. All were acclaimed in the election, all were employees of the Canadian Northern Railway.

From 1913 to 1966, Leaside had its own mayor. The last four occupants were - Howard T. Burrell (1951–1955); Charles H. Hiscott (1956–1961); Lloyd M. Dickinson (1962); Beth Nealson (1963–1966).

In 1967, Leaside was amalgamated with the township of East York to form the borough of East York, from this point forward Leaside was a community within East York, and governed by the municipal council of East York. Amalgamation was opposed by Leaside residents fearing residential tax increases and the loss of the Leaside community identity. Taxes in Leaside were lower than the surrounding regions as residential taxes in Leaside were subsidized by those from industrial areas; residential taxes climbed in Leaside every year from 1967 to 1972. Beth Nealson, the last mayor of Leaside ran against True Davidson (the reeve of East York) for mayor of the amalgamated borough. Nealson lost to Davidson.

In 1998, East York (including Leaside) was amalgamated with the City of Toronto to form the City of Toronto, from this point forward Leaside was a community within Toronto, and governed by the municipal council of Toronto.

In 2006, incumbent Don Valley West councillor Jane Pitfield, whose ward included Leaside, ran for mayor. Former Progressive Conservative MPP John Parker won her former seat in that year's election. In the 2010 Toronto municipal election that saw Rob Ford elected to the office of Mayor of Toronto, Parker won another tight race for councillor of Ward 26, beating runner up Jon Burnside by only 415 votes. After a tumultuous term of increased traffic in the neighbourhood and rapid development along the Laird Drive corridor and in Thorncliffe Park, Parker lost the seat to Burnside by a margin of 3,248 votes.

=== Mayors of the Town of Leaside ===
Mayors of Leaside from the town's incorporation until its merger into East York.

- 1913-1914 Randolph McRae - former official in the Canadian Northern Railway's Land Department
- 1915-1923 Robert Phipps Ormsby - secretary of the Canadian National Railway
- 1924-1930 Herbert Horsfall - president of Canada Wire and Cable Company, co-founder of the Leaside Munitions Company, and president of the Leaside Housing Company.
- 1931-1935 George H. Wilkinson - station agent for the Canadian Pacific Railway in Parkdale
- 1936-1937 John Scott
- 1938-1947 Henry Howard Talbot - a carpenter by trade, he started a construction business and in the 1920s, bought land in Leaside and became a land developer, building homes and a low-rise apartment building
- 1948-1950 G. Trace Manes - one of the founders of the Leaside Baseball Association, Manes worked for Massey-Harris for 38 years. After serving as mayor he was a member of the Metro Planning Board
- 1951-1955 Howard T. Burrell - a chartered accountant by profession
- 1956-1961 Charles Henry Hiscott - resigned as mayor to become the town's treasurer. Subsequently worked as a bylaw enforcement officer and standards tribunal officer for East York.
- 1962 Lloyd M. Dickinson - an entrepreneur, Dickinson variously owned a plastics products firm, a real estate holding company, and in the 1970s built the first industrial condominiums in Canada.
- 1963-1966 Beth Nealson - a former reporter and columnist for a local newspaper, she first ran for school trustee at the urging of her colleagues in the Imperial Order Daughters of the Empire in 1952. Went on to be elected to Leaside council in 1959 and ran for mayor against Dickinson in the next election, defeating him by 5 votes after a recount. She became known as "Mrs. Leaside". When East York and Leaside were amalgamated she ran against East York reeve True Davidson to be mayor of the new borough in what was billed by the media as the "Battle of the Belles".

== Notable people ==
- Stephen Harper, the 22nd Prime Minister of Canada, was born in Leaside and attended Northlea Public School for his primary education.
- Yolanda T. Marshall, author, wrote her first book in Leaside.
- Tom Pashby, was an ophthalmologist and sport safety advocate based in Leaside, who served as chairman of the Canadian Standards Association and pioneered safer helmets for ice hockey.
- Royce Frith, lawyer, diplomat, and Senator.

== Bibliography ==
- Ron Brown (1997). Toronto's Lost Villages. Toronto: Polar Bear Press. p. 198. ISBN 978-1-896757-02-5.
- Jane Pitfield, ed. (2000) [1999]. Leaside (2nd ed.). Toronto: National Heritage Books. p. 324. ISBN 978-1-896219-54-7.
- Jack I. Rempel (1982). The Town of Leaside - a brief history. Toronto: East York Historical Society.
