= Sunnybrook School (Toronto) =

Coordinates: 43.69889°N 79.38257°W

Location
- 469 Merton Street; Toronto, Ontario, M4S 1B4; Canada

Information
- School type: Private; Elementary school
- Motto: The WILL to Learn; The COURAGE to Act; The CONFIDENCE to Succeed
- Founded: 1952
- Director and Principal: Irene Davy, Ph.D.
- Grades: JK – 6
- Enrollment: 130 (1985-2013)
- Language: English
- Campus: Urban
- Mascot: Merton the Wizard
- Website: www.sunnybrookschool.com

Sunnybrook School (SBS) is a coeducational, private elementary school offering Junior Kindergarten to Grade 6, with one class per grade. Founded in 1952 as one of Toronto's first Preschools, Sunnybrook is located on a residential street in North Toronto, specifically in the Mount Pleasant West area of Davisville Village west of Bayview Avenue. Sunnybrook School has been family-run for over 60 years. In April 1999, Sunnybrook School became Canada's first English speaking school to implement the International Baccalaureate Primary Years Programme (IB PYP). In 2002, Sunnybrook School became the first authorized IB PYP school in Canada outside of Quebec.

Since 1960, the school has occupied its own purpose-built premises, which have been renovated and enlarged three times (1985, 1998, 2011).

== History ==
=== Founding and Naming ===
Sunnybrook School was founded in 1952 by Mrs. Irmingard Hoff. Hoff “studied early childhood education in Vienna” and immigrated to Canada from Austria in 1950. Sunnybrook School was one of North Toronto's first Preschools. It was first located in the basement of St. Augustine of Canterbury Church in Leaside. The name of the school came from its original proximity to two contemporaneous developments: first, Sunnybrook Hospital, which was at the time a hospital for veterans, called the Sunnybrook Veterans Hospital, and second, Sunnybrook Plaza, which was built in 1951 and was the first shopping mall in Toronto and one of the first malls in Canada. The school's teaching philosophy was originally based on a combination of Montessori and Fröbel methods.

=== Move to Merton Street ===
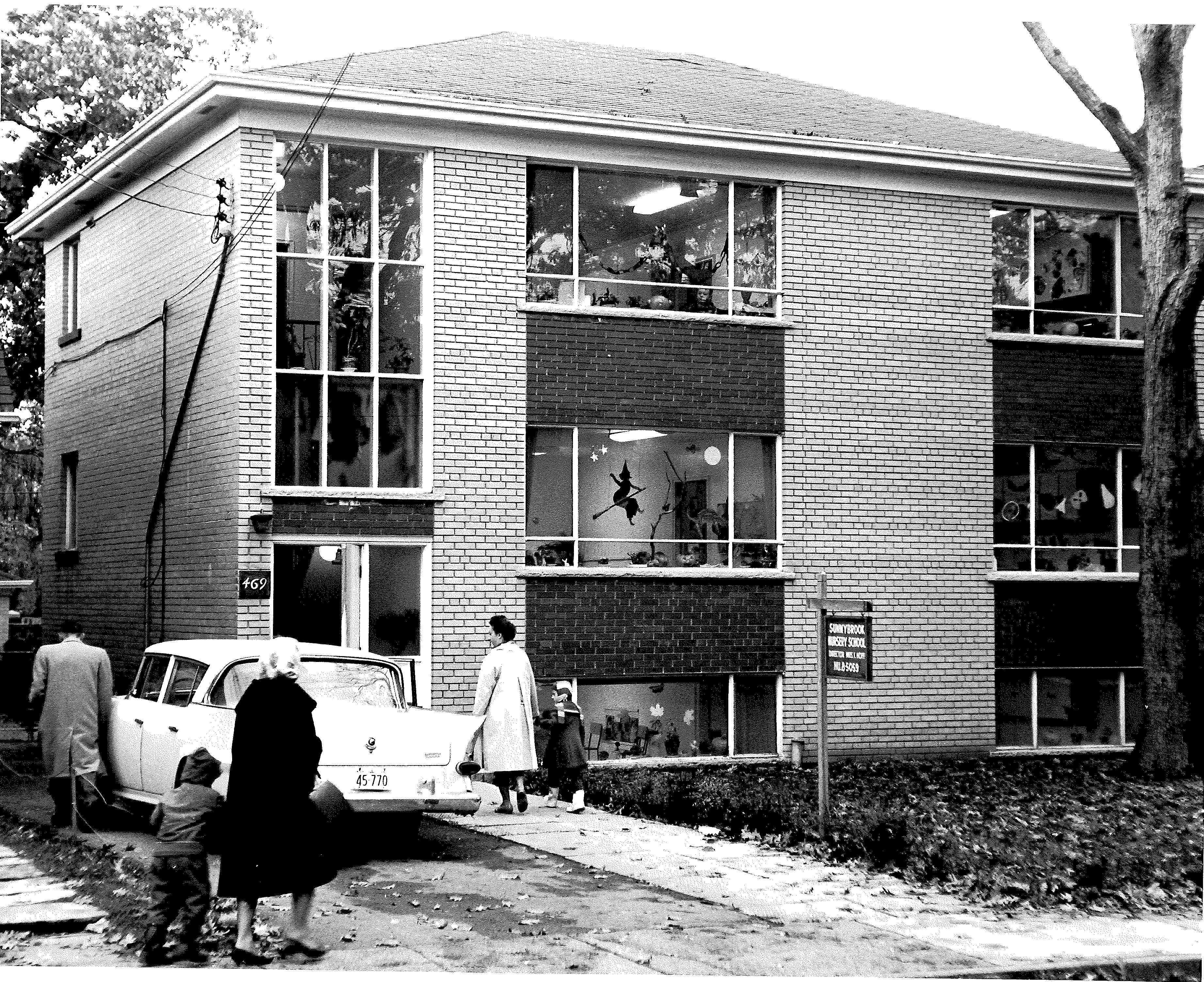
Sunnybrook School's original purpose-built facility on Merton Street, circa 1960.

In 1960 the school moved to the present 469 Merton Street location, which borders on Mount Pleasant Cemetery. The new, purpose-built facility on Merton Street was funded by loans from parents of students. In 1960, Sunnybrook School had 65 students in 5 classes and was the first “privately operated nursery school in the city in a building designed for the job.” In 1967 the school had 94 students and a staff of 20, with 12 teachers. With housing prices increasing and more women and mothers pursuing careers of their own, the nursery school filled a growing need not only for morning child-care but also for all-day services. The all-day services provided a “planned learning program” and also included “‘real tea’ at 4p.m., complete with sandwiches, to stay [the students] until dinner. Unlike morning pupils, many all-day pupils [had] mothers who work[ed], who [couldn't] get dinner ready by 6 o’clock.”

The founding director of Sunnybrook School, Irmingard Hoff, was also President of the Nursery Education Association of Ontario (NEAO). In the 1960s, “one of the [NEAO’s] primary objectives [was] to qualify teachers to train ‘exceptional’ or ‘handicapped’ children.” To this end, the NEAO coordinated with “the Ontario government to set up teaching courses in universities and community colleges.” During a 1967 speech, Hoff promised to increase the number of certified nursery teachers in Ontario from 190 to 800 within five years.

Since 1960 the Sunnybrook School facility on Merton Street has undergone three expansions.

=== First Expansion ===
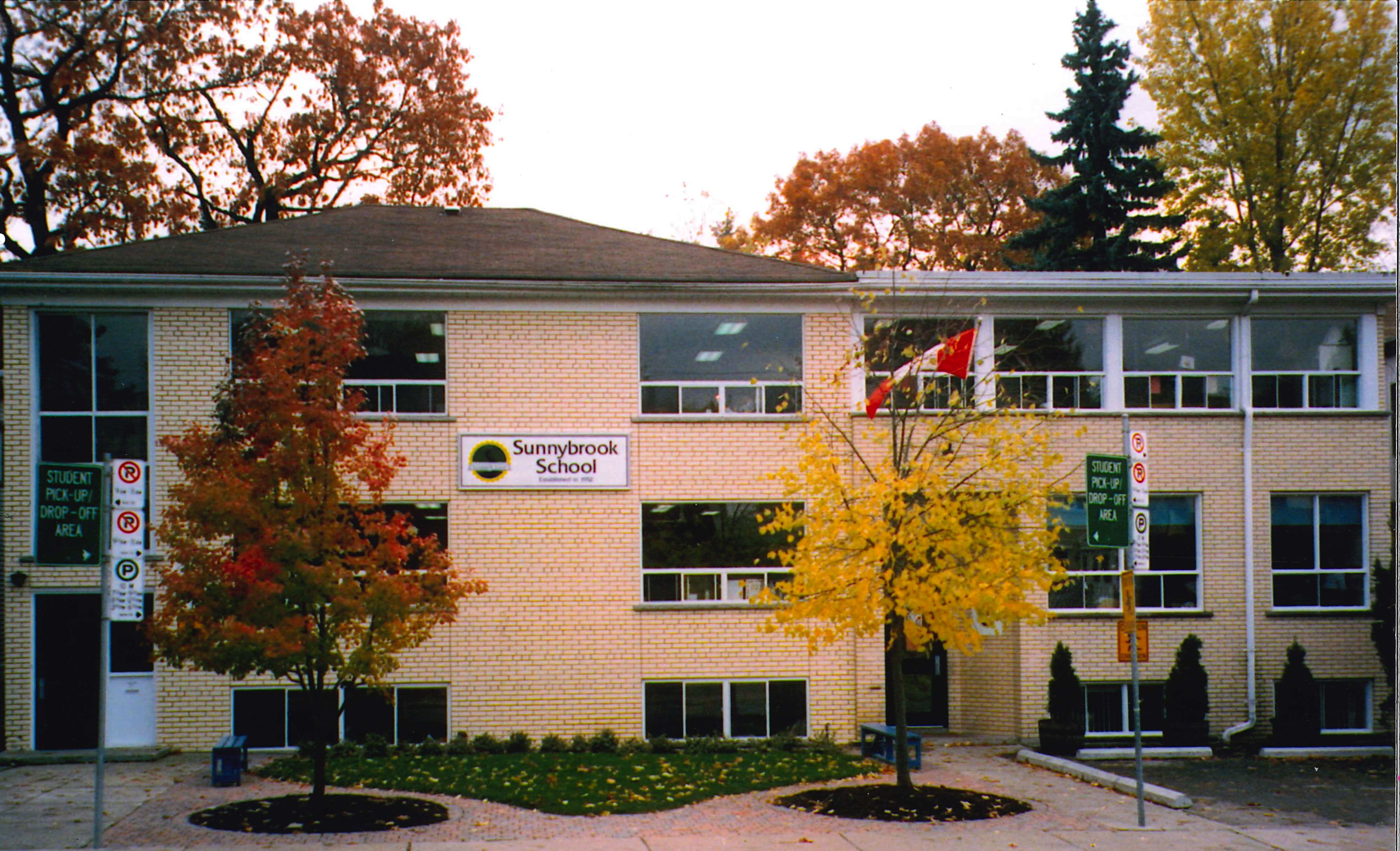
Sunnybrook School after the first expansion and renovation, circa 1985.

In 1985 Irmingard Hoff's daughter, Irene Davy, Ph.D. (Educational Psychology, University of Vienna), became the director of the school. That same year a neighbouring property was purchased and an addition was built, improving the facilities by adding a gym, three classrooms and a new kitchen. In order for the school to offer the full complement of elementary grades, preschool classes were phased out in the 1980ʼs.

=== Second Expansion ===
In 1998 a new gym was created at the back of the building (facing the Mt. Pleasant Cemetery) and the old gym was converted into two classrooms.

=== Third Expansion ===
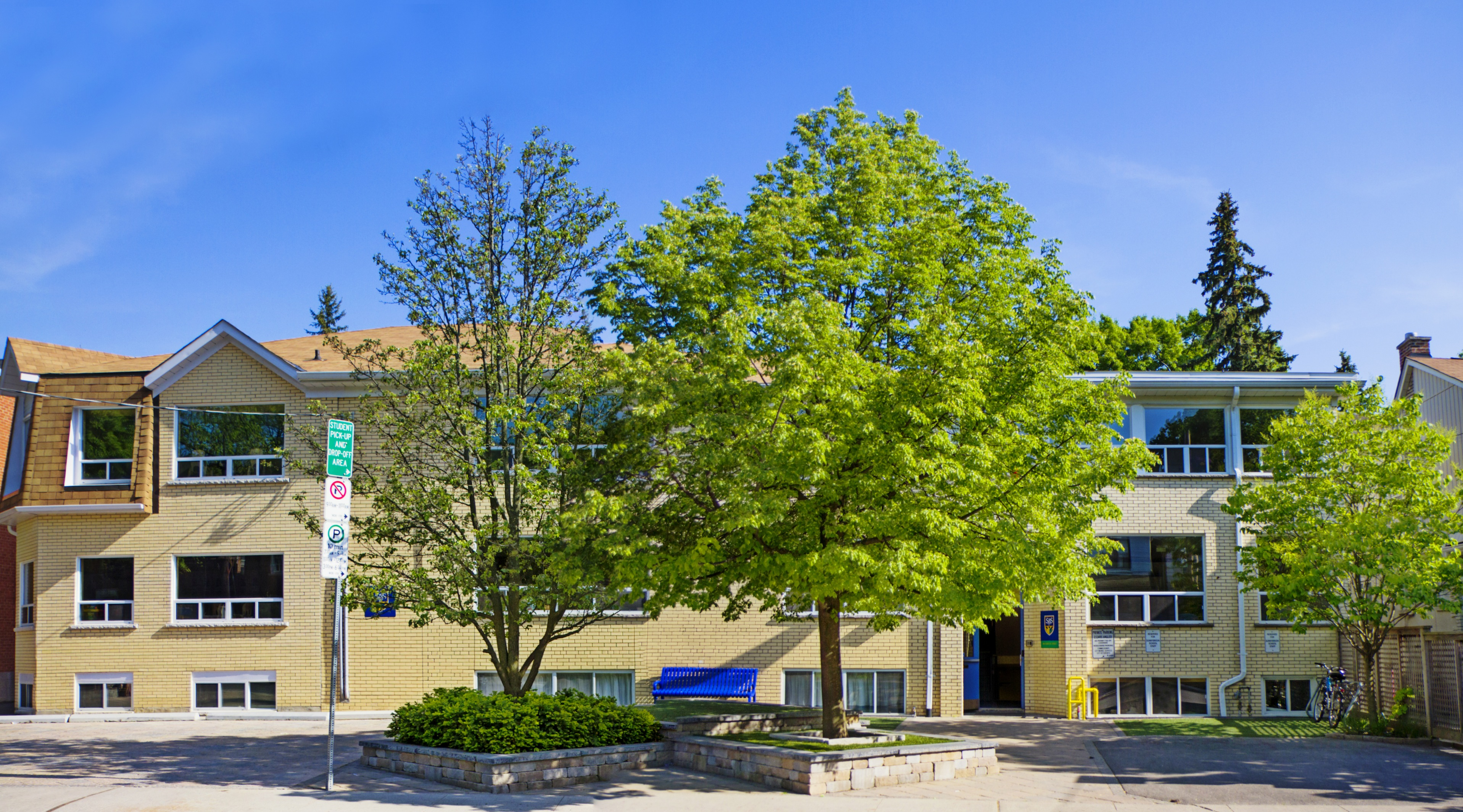
Sunnybrook School after the third expansion and renovation.

Having purchased the neighbouring property of 471 Merton Street, Sunnybrook School undertook another expansion and renovation project in 2011. The renovation involved all extant classrooms and offices.

==== New facilities added during 2011 expansion ====
- An Arts Studio that serves as a theatre, assembly and events space and a studio for visual arts class
- A Music Studio
- A French Studio
- Four new classrooms
- A Locker Room for senior students
- An extension of the existing playground area with artificial turf

=== Adoption of IB PYP and Involvement in the International Baccalaureate (IB) ===
In April 1999, Sunnybrook School became Canadaʼs first English speaking school to implement the International Baccalaureate Primary Years Programme (IB PYP). Sunnybrook School became fully authorized as an IB PYP school in 2002. The Director and Principal of Sunnybrook School, Dr. Irene Davy, has been actively involved with the IB in a variety of roles. Dr. Davy's work on educating for international mindedness has had an influence on a number of other educational institutions in Toronto and around the world.

== Curriculum ==
Faculty at Sunnybrook School refine the curriculum annually in accordance with the framework of the IB PYP and with reference to the guidelines of the Ontario Ministry of Education. Sunnybrook School educates its students according to the IB principles of global competence and citizenship. Sunnybrook School draws on the IB Learner Profile for a common vocabulary of values and behaviours that contribute to the development of the attributes of global citizenship. The curriculum at Sunnybrook School is focused on international mindedness and includes the Singapore Mathematics Programme, an early Literacy Curriculum, full day enriched Kindergarten and Inquiry-based learning.

Twenty-first century pedagogy includes a focus on concepts, learning through inquiry and learning skills and dispositions that are transferable and enduring, leading to lifelong learning. Sunnybrook School applies this pedagogy, using the methods and ideas of current educational thought leaders, including David Perkins, Heidi Hayes Jacobs, Lynne Erickson and others.

== Student life ==
Sunnybrook School is a member of the Small Schools Athletic Federation (SSAF). Students compete with schools across the city in soccer, basketball, softball, cross country, track and field and ball hockey.

== Notable alumni ==
- Josh Matlow, Toronto City Councillor.
- Claire Tacon, novelist, winner of 2010 Metcalf-Rooke award, short-listed for the Bronwen Wallace Award and the CBC Literary Prizes.
