= History of cities in Canada =

Canada's cities span the continent of North America from east to west, but many of them are located relatively close to the border with the United States. Cities are home to the majority of Canada's approximately 35.75 million inhabitants (as of 2015)—just over 80 percent of Canadians lived in urban areas in 2006.

== Early urbanization: 14,000 BCE – 1850 CE ==
=== Settlements and villages, 14,000 BCE – 1541 CE ===
During the Wisconsin glaciation 50,000-17,000 years ago, falling sea levels allowed people to move across the Bering land bridge that joined Siberia to northwestern North America (Alaska). Alaska was ice-free because of low snowfall, allowing a small population to exist. The Laurentide Ice Sheet covered most of Canada, blocking nomadic inhabitants and confining them to Alaska (East Beringia) for thousands of years. Arriving in Canada around 16,500-13,000 years ago after initially inhabiting the territories of Alaska, archaeological evidence suggests that the Paleo-Indians' first "widespread" habitation of Canada and further south occurred during the last glacial period or, more specifically, what is known as the late glacial maximum. Yet Canada's first people did not build towns or cities upon arrival. They were few in number compared to the size of the North American continent and most lived a nomadic subsistence lifestyle, following the migration of animal herds that provided food.

Over time, Canada's First Nations started to construct different kinds of settlements, though they were generally temporary. For instance, the semi-nomadic peoples of the Maritimes, Quebec, and Northern Ontario, such as the Mi'kmaq, Cree, and Algonquin constructed temporary camps and villages with wigwams and long houses as the basic architecture of settlement. Nomadic First Nations living on the Canadian Prairies developed tipis with thin wooden frames and an outer covering of animal hides for portability in erecting temporary camps, because the people often moved to a new location each day to follow the bison herds. In the interior of British Columbia, semi-permanent settlements were constructed by First Nations with pit houses. In the far north, the Inuit constructed temporary camps with igloos, a domed structure made of snow, and tents made of animal hides in the summer.

The Haida constructed villages on Canada's west coast. These people constructed settlements with large houses of red cedar planks, demonstrating advanced carpentry and joinery skills. The most advanced design was the six beam house, named for the number of beams that supported the roof. The front of each house would be decorated with a Totem pole, brightly painted with artistic designs; the house would sometimes be painted likewise.

Near 1000 CE, many Iroquoian-speaking communities around the Great Lakes began to switch from a nomadic life to more permanent settlements. The richness of the soil in the St. Lawrence valley, along with the abundance of fisheries nearby and of forests rich in game animals, provided resources for the establishment of Iroquois villages. In what is today Southern Ontario and Quebec, the Iroquois constructed permanent agricultural settlements with populations of several hundred to several thousand people. These villages were made up of long houses and could have fortifications such as palisades.

=== Settlements, Villages, and Towns, 1541-1850 ===
Aboriginal peoples had been developing different kinds of settlements over thousands of years in Canada, but it was the arrival of Europeans in the 16th century which led to the establishment of the modern cities of Canada. Many of the new arrivals, both French and English, were from cities and brought with them the experience and knowledge of urban life. They used their knowledge and technology for city building, implementing techniques for the construction of permanent buildings, transportation and communication facilities, and the means of producing food for concentrated groups of people.

Cities were slow to grow in the early period of European colonization in Canada. Those who arrived did so within a colonial and mercantile context that emphasised the exploitation of the colony for economic purposes at a minimum of imperial expense. Because the colonial economies in Canada were based to a great extent on the fur trade, cities remained mostly administrative centres for the colonies. It was also a period of conflict between England and France, rival colonial powers until 1763, and between Britain and the United States of America from that point until the mid-nineteenth century. This turmoil discouraged the development of cities.

==== The cities ====
Eastern cities such as St. John's (1583), Saint John (1604), Quebec City (1608), Montreal (1642), Halifax (1749), Windsor (1749), and Sherbrooke (1793) were officially incorporated as cities in these years. To the west, Toronto was established in 1793 as York. Of these cities, Montreal would become the most prominent city in Canada up to the 20th century. Toronto grew at a quick pace, gaining its status as a city and present name in 1834.

Montreal—1642

The area now known as Montreal has been a place of human habitation by Canada's native peoples for the last 8000 years. The first European, Jacques Cartier, reached the site in 1535. However, it was only in 1639 that the first permanent French settlement was established by Frenchman Jerome Le Royer, leading to the establishment of Ville Marie, a Roman Catholic mission, in 1642.

After a series of brutal attacks by the Iroquois, defending their territory, the arrival of new colonists in 1653 ensured the future of the city. The settlement became a fur trading centre but endured continuous raids by warring Iroquois until the Great Peace of 1701 guaranteed its safety.

After the Treaty of Paris in 1763, all the French territory in North America, including Ville Marie, became part of British North America. The town was subjected to invasion and a brief occupation by American forces in 1775, but they were subsequently routed and Montreal retaken by the British, with Canadian and Indian help.

An era of growth and prosperity began as British immigrants arrived and the fur-trading North West Company was established, operating from headquarters in Ville Marie and competing with the Hudson's Bay Company. The Eagle Foundry of Montreal built the Äccommodation¨, Canada's first steam powered vessel. The opening of the Lachine Canal in 1825 reinforced the location as a port. Coal gas street lighting was introduced in 1838.

The City of Montreal was established in 1832 with 27,000 inhabitants. During the period of its primarily European history, Montreal initially had a Francophone majority but Anglophone immigration tipped the balance by about 1830. From 1844 to 1849 Montreal served as the capital of the United Province of Canada.

== The rise of the city: 1850–1920 ==
=== Factors of growth ===
Canada's first cities formed during these years with high population numbers, caused by a high domestic birth rate and the arrival of white, Christian immigrants from Europe, drawn by the hope for a better life in a new world. They served as outposts of European civilization in a land that was still mostly wild and inhospitable for settlers. In 1851 Canada's population stood at 2.4 million. By 1861 it had grown a third, to 3.2 million and by 1871 to 3.7 million.

Economic forces were also at play. The repeal of the Corn Laws in Britain in 1846 marked a symbolic end to the era of mercantilism and the beginning of the era of capitalism. Private investment, mostly from Britain, supported a nascent industrial structure based on transportation (the steam train), construction, electricity, public works, heavy manufacturing, consumer and industrial services and related financial institutions.

Technological innovations also supported city growth, including the telegraph, water and sewer systems, the telephone, urban transit, the electric light, the skyscraper, central heating and the techniques of light and heavy manufacturing. These new transportation and communications technologies also led to the creation of a new inter-urban network of cities which contributed to their growth based on mutual interaction.

The fading fear of attack by the USA provided a peaceful context for urban growth and the movement away from colonialism towards democracy gave urban dwellers the power to influence the shape of their cities.

The construction of universities and cultural facilities in cities put a more human face on the harsh environment.

The British North America Act (BNA), an act of the British Parliament, which established an independent and democratic Canada in 1867, reflected the rural character of the country at that time. Of a population of 3,600,000 almost 2,900,000 were rural dwellers while 700,000 lived in cities. The political forces at play involved both federal and provincial powers. Therefore, the BNA provided areas of exclusive jurisdiction for federal and provincial governments. Because cities were not predominant, the allocation of taxing powers for the financing of their growth, was left in the hands of the provinces. This would have important negative consequences a century later.

The Canadian Pacific Railway, created to realize the dream of Prime Minister John A. Macdonald for a transcontinental nation, was almost solely responsible for the emergence of the cities of western Canada during these years.

In Quebec, the Roman Catholic Church worked to maintain the rural nature of Quebec society, in the belief that this would help preserve the Catholic nature of the population and reinforce the Church's strength. One notable example of this policy was seen in the church sponsored attempt to ¨colonize¨ the rural Abitibi region of the province by farmers in the early twentieth century. The project failed because the region was only marginally suited to agriculture. This policy served to militate against urban growth in that province.

Furthermore, the nature of immigration limited the growth of cities in Quebec. Most immigrants to Canada during these years spoke English and preferred to settle in large cities, including Montreal, where an English-speaking population already existed. On the other hand, there were few French-speaking immigrants and the mostly French-speaking cities elsewhere in the province, including Quebec City and Trois-Rivières could not rely on this source for growth.

Emigration too had a negative effect on the growth of cities in Quebec. Around 1900, economic conditions in Quebec were very difficult and about 1,000,000 French-speaking Canadians left the province looking for work in the textile mills of New England.

By 1901, cities had grown to a point where the Union of Canadian Municipalities was formed to represent their interests.

=== Changing structures – high rise cores and suburbs ===
During these years the structures of cities evolved rapidly. In 1850 the city was essentially all ¨downtown¨. The main buildings, serving residential, commercial and industrial functions, were made of wood or stone, mostly four to five stories tall and self-supporting. Streets were of dirt or occasionally cobblestone and strewn with garbage and human excrement. Animals wandered about and horses were everywhere, solo, with rider or pulling wagons or carriages. In larger cities public transit was provided by horse cars on rails. Gas lights provided illumination at night. The force of life was provided by muscle power, animal or human.

This changed rapidly. The introduction of the self-supporting steel framed building in the 1880s led to the construction of skyscrapers of six floors and more. The introduction of electricity and telephones was marked by the installation of hundreds of telephone and hydro poles along city streets, supporting electric and telephone cables. Electric street lighting replaced gas lights. The construction of water and sewer systems eliminated human waste from the urban living space. The introduction of municipal garbage collection reduced the presence of garbage.

In the latter part of the century, the rise of the new middle class created a demand for housing beyond the city core. This was met by private contractors building individual homes on single lots in newly created suburbs, adjacent to the downtown core. Public transport was provided by the extension of the new electric powered streetcar to the suburbs. The downtown core began to lose its residential vocation and became a space increasingly devoted to commerce, industry and to a lesser extent, public life.

In the new century the introduction of the car began to make its own dramatic mark. By 1920, the horse was gone, most cities had paved roads in the downtown core and main paved roads served the rising numbers of cars in the suburbs. At this point the Canadian city came to resemble what we see today.

=== The cities ===
==== Dominance of Montreal ====
The rise of Montreal as Canada's metropolis was the most important feature of urban development during these years. In 1851 the population stood at 57,000, but grew to 90,000 by 1861, becoming in the process Canada's largest city. It would hold this position for more than one hundred years before being surpassed by Toronto.

Transportation made Montreal. Situated at the head of the St. Lawrence River, it became Canada's major port and rail centre. Ships from overseas arrived bringing goods and immigrants. First the Allan Line Royal Mail Steamers in 1854 followed by Canadian Pacific Steamship Lines in 1903 operated trans Atlantic passenger liners to Britain. Shippers from the Great Lakes system, notably Canada Steamship Lines Inc. brought grain for export.

The great Western Railway from Montreal to Windsor went into operation in 1854 carrying passengers and goods into the hinterland, followed by the Grand Trunk Railway from Montreal to Sarnia in 1860. The Canadian Pacific Railway (CPR) one of the great railway companies of the world, established its headquarters there. The huge CPR Angus Shops (1904) and Montreal Locomotive Works (1901) formed the heart of Canada's heavy industrial capability, building steam engines and rolling stock for the railways. Canadian Car and Foundry manufactured street cars.

Other major manufacturing industries, grew along the Lachine Canal (1825), including Redpath Sugar, Darling and Brady, soap manufacturers, the St. Lawrence Glass Company, the Canadian Rubber Company, Laing Packing and Provisions (1852) and Belding Paul & Co. silk manufacturers provided consumer and industrial goods. The Imperial Tobacco Company (1912) became Canada's largest manufacturer of cigarettes. Morgans, Canada's first department store, opened its doors in 1845. The Montreal Telegraph Company, began offering service in 1847 and Canadian Marconi Company (CMC Electronics) was formed in Montreal in 1903.

Financing for this activity was provided by the banks of St. James Street (Saint Jacques Street) which became the heart of Canada's financial sector anchored by the Bank of Montreal (1817) and the Montreal Stock Exchange, founded in 1872.

Canada's first skyscraper, the eight-storey New York Life Insurance Company Building, was built in 1889. The elegant Queen's Hotel opened for business in 1863. In 1875 in Montreal, a McGill student, J. Creighton, established the basic rules for hockey as we know it today. The world's first facility dedicated to hockey, the Westmount Arena, was built in Montreal in 1898.

Engineering works included a steam-powered municipal water system in operation by 1857 and the massive Victoria Bridge (Montreal) built in 1859. The Montreal City Passenger Railway Company began offering horse-car service in 1861 and converted to electric powered streetcars in 1891. In 1884 the Royal Electric Company began providing electricity to the city.

During the First World War, Montreal became a major producer of munitions. Among other things, cordite was manufactured at Beloeil, Quebec, by Canadian Explosives Limited and at Nobel, Quebec, by British Cordite Limited.

Montreal's place as the largest French-speaking city in North America, as well as the home of a substantial Roman Catholic population, was reinforced by the establishment of Notre-Dame Basilica (Montreal), the initial construction of which was completed in 1830. French-language newspapers including La Presse (Canadian newspaper) in 1884 and Le Devoir in 1910 and the Monument National theatre stood as pillars of cultural life. McGill University, founded in 1821, and the Montreal Star (1869) and Montreal Gazette (1785, originally a French language publication) newspapers stood as testaments to the vitality of the English-speaking community.

The Golden Square Mile, a residential area on the south slope of Mount Royal, became the home of Canada's wealthiest citizens, including William Dow, John Redpath, William Notman, James McGill, John Molson, Sir George Simpson (administrator) and Sir Hugh Allan.

By 1921 the city had 618,000 inhabitants.

==== Hopeful beginnings east ====
Toronto, having a population of 30,000 in 1851, and Bytown (renamed Ottawa in 1855), having a population of 8,000, would become respectively the future economic and political capitals of Canada.

Toronto (1834)

As was the case with many Canadian cities, the place now known as Toronto was inhabited for thousands of years before the arrival of Europeans, by a number of tribes including the Cayugas, Mohawks, Neutral-Erie, Oneidas, Senecas and Wendat.

Between 1750 and 1759 the French operated a trading post, Fort Rouille, in the area where the Canadian National Exhibition is now located. The British purchased 250,000 acres (1,000 km^{2}) of land from the native peoples in 1787 and Governor John Graves Simcoe chose the site for the capital (which he named York) of the newly created Upper Canada. Concerned with military transportation to protect the new colony from US attack, he built roads west to what is now Windsor, east towards Montreal, and north, the present day Yonge Street.

York was attacked and burned to the ground by the American Army in 1813 and the Canadians, in retaliation, attacked and burned the White House in Washington to the ground in 1814. Another US attack that same year was defeated. The town was renamed Toronto in 1834 and William Lyon Mackenzie served as the first mayor.

Toronto grew quickly in the latter part of the century, its population passing from 30,000 in 1851 to 56,000 in 1871, then to 86,400 by 1881 and to 181,000 by 1891. In part this was due to Irish immigration resulting from the Great Irish Famine between 1845 and 1849. The presence of the Roman Catholic Irish among Protestants led to racial tension, culminating in the Julibee Riots of 1875.

Toronto's rise to prominence was initiated by the arrival of the train and telegraph. The railways connected Toronto to a wide hinterland. The Great Western Railway, from Montreal to Toronto to Windsor, was completed in 1854 and the Grand Trunk Railway, from Montreal to Toronto to Sarnia, in 1869. Along with the railways came the telegraph. Toronto was the first Canadian city to get service when it was introduced by the Toronto, Hamilton and Niagara Electro-Magnetic Telegraph Co. in 1846.

Industrial mass production, in this case of clothing, became part of Toronto's fabric. Livingstone and Johnston, (later W.R. Johnston & Company), founded in Toronto in 1868, was the first in Canada to cut cloth and sew together the component pieces. It used the newly introduced sewing machine as part of a continuous operation. William E. Davies established Canada's first large-scale hog slaughterhouse in Toronto in 1874.

Toronto became the home of the first plastics produced in Canada. The Rathburn Company of Toronto began to produce wood distillates including wood alcohol and calcium acetate, used to make acetic acid or acetone, in 1897. The Standard Chemical Company of Toronto, established in 1897, initiated the production of acetic acid in 1899 and formaldehyde, from the oxidation of wood alcohol, in 1909. This latter product was an essential element in the production of the fully synthetic, phenol-formaldehyde plastic (Bakelite).

Heavy manufacturing took hold in nearby cities. General Electric Canada, founded by Thomas Edison in nearby Peterborough in 1892, contributed to heavy manufacturing techniques through the fabrication of large electric generators and electric motors, which were used to supply the rapidly growing Canadian market for electrical generating equipment. Similar heavy electrical products were manufactured by Westinghouse Canada, established in Hamilton, Ontario, in 1897. Steel mills were established there as well.

Public services improved city life. A steam-powered municipal water pumping station was in service in Toronto by 1841, the same year that coal gas street lighting was introduced. Horsecar service began in Toronto in 1861. It was operated by the Toronto Street Railways until 1892, when it was replaced by electric streetcar service. The Toronto Power House and the Hydro-Electric Power Commission of Ontario began offering electricity to that city and the province in 1906.

The growth of the city could be seen in the construction of skyscrapers. The first self-supporting steel-framed skyscraper in Canada was the Robert Simpson Department Store at the corner of Yonge and Queen with six floors and electric elevators, built in 1895. This was followed by the Traders Bank of Canada, (15 floors, Yonge Street, 1905), the Canadian Pacific Building, (16 floors, 1913), the Royal Bank, (20 floors, 1915), the Royal York Hotel, 1929, and the Canadian Imperial Bank of Commerce, in 1931. Canada's first escalator was installed in 1904 at Eaton's Department Store on Queen Street.

The beginnings of the rise of Toronto as the cultural capital of Canada were seen in the establishment in 1827 of what would become the University of Toronto and the founding of The Globe (later The Globe and Mail) in 1844. Book publishing also took root. Publishers of note included Musson Book Company, 1894, G.N. Morang, 1897, McLeod & Allen, 1901, the University of Toronto Press, 1901, Oxford University Press, 1904, John C. Winston, 1904, Macmillan Company of Canada Ltd., 1905, McClelland and Goodchild, 1906, (later McClelland and Stewart), Cassell and Company Limited, 1907, J.M. Dent and Sons, 1913 and Thomas Nelson and Sons Limited, 1913. Performing arts space was expanded by the completion of the Grand Opera House, in 1874, Massey Hall in 1894 and the Royal Alexandra Theatre in 1907. The Canadian National Exhibition, established in 1878, became a prominent feature of city and Canadian life.

As it continued to grow, the city began to expand at the periphery and newly created adjacent towns were annexed. They included West Toronto, East Toronto, Parkdale and Brockton Village.

==== New Southern Ontario cities - the essence of Canada ====
St. Catharines (1821), London (1826), Hamilton (1846), Oshawa (1850), Kitchener (1854) and Windsor (1854) founded in the mid-nineteenth century would eventually form the core of the most densely populated and heavily industrialized region of Canada.

==== Hopeful beginnings west ====
For the most part, creations of the CPR, Winnipeg (1873), Calgary (1876), Regina (1882), Saskatoon (1883), Vancouver (1886) and Edmonton (1904) were strung like beads on a chain across Canada, linked by the new transcontinental railway. Victoria (1849) had earlier colonial origins. Vancouver would quickly become the most important.

Vancouver (1886)

Evidence indicates that native peoples, notably the Coast Salish, inhabited the area that became Vancouver for about 10,000 years before the arrival of European settlers. The first Europeans to explore the area included Spanish Captain José María Narváez in 1791 and British Captain George Vancouver in 1792. During his exploration Vancouver met with another Spanish expedition in the command of Dionisio Alcalá Galiano and Cayetano Valdés y Flores. Simon Fraser was the first white man to reach the area overland, which he did in 1808. However, native resistance to the presence of settlement was strong and it was not until 1862 that the first white settlement, the McCleery Farm, was established in what is now known as the Southlands district of Vancouver.

A year later, Moodyville was established on the north shore of Burrard Inlet as home to lumbering activity and a sawmill. Stamps Mill (1867) was established on the south shore of the Inlet in what is now downtown Vancouver. The quality of Vancouver lumber quickly gained a worldwide reputation and was used to provide masts for the Royal Navy and in the construction of the Gate of Heavenly Peace in the Forbidden City, Beijing.

A saloon built a mile to the west of Stamps Mill soon became an area of settlement eventually known as Gastown. It was named in honour of the talkative saloon owner ¨Gassy¨ John Deighton. The area was surveyed by the British colonial administrators and formally renamed Granville in 1871. The construction of the first federal penitentiary in New Westminster in 1878, bore witness to the lawlessness of the region.

The CPR made Vancouver. William Van Horne, President of the CPR, chose the area as the western terminus for the transcontinental railway and renamed it Vancouver in 1886. Along with the railway came transcontinental telegraph service, also operated by Canadian Pacific. Stanley Park was established by the new city council and a disastrous fire destroyed the city that same year. A new city quickly arose from the ashes complete with a modern water system, the cities' first sewer system in 1886, electricity in 1887 and streetcar services.

In 1891, the newly formed Canadian Pacific Steamship Lines began offering trans-Pacific steamship service from Vancouver with three large steel-hulled ships, the "Empress" liners: India, China and Japan.In 1902, Canadian Pacific completed a trans-Pacific cable telegraph, linking Vancouver with Australia and New Zealand. This reinforced Vancouver's position as a Pacific transportation and communication gateway.

The population of the city mushroomed passing from about 5,000 in 1886 to 42,000 in 1900 and it became, in the process, Canada's third largest city. The appearance of the skyscraper provided visual evidence of growth, the first being the Dominion Building, (13 floors), in 1910, followed by the World (Sun) Tower, (17 floors), in 1912.

Vancouver society was especially turbulent during these years. The First War saw two general strikes and the city was hit by depression in the 1890s, 1919, 1923 and 1929. Racism was also present. The presence of a large number of Chinese in Vancouver, located there as a result of immigration to work on the CPR, led to serious anti-Chinese rioting organized in part by the Asiatic Exclusion League in 1907. In 1914, 376 prospective Punjabi immigrants arriving aboard the ship Komataga Maru were refused entry into Canada on a technicality, the enforcement of which was racially inspired. They were forced to return to India.

After the first war working-class neighbourhoods, including Mount Pleasant, South Vancouver and Grandview-Woodland, began to appear. The CPR established Point Grey for development as an exclusive neighbourhood in 1908. Shaughnessy Heights was also established for the well-heeled.

The founding of the University of British Columbia in 1915 represented a significant development in the cultural field.

==== Holding their own ====
During this period, the centre of Canada quickly shifted west and south leaving St. John's, Halifax, Saint John, Quebec and Sherbrooke far from the centre but still close enough, through marine and rail connections, for them to retain residual economic and demographic weight.

== The City Dominant: 1920–present ==
Until 1921 Canada was a largely rural nation. However, by that date the balance had shifted. Of Canada's population of 8,787,000 people, roughly 4,300,000, or 50 percent, lived in cities. This was the result of internal urban population growth, the steady influx of the rural population into the cities and the arrival of immigrants, most of whom settled in cities. This shift was permanent and the urban percentage of the population continued to increase for the remainder of the twentieth century. Over 85 percent of Canada's citizens were urban dwellers in 2008.

The production of wealth also became concentrated in cities during this period. Rural production (fishing, forestry, agriculture, mining), was outstripped by urban manufacturing and the service sectors. In 2008, about 90 percent of Canada's economy was urban based.

=== The Golden Age 1920–1970 ===
==== A harmonious balance ====
During this period there was a balance in the factors that contributed to city growth. The increase in population was supported by a number of elements including private investment for commerce and industry, which provided jobs and money for consumer spending and public investment in education and infrastructure including, roads, public transit, electric, water and sewer systems. Canada's mostly white, Christian population also provided a homogeneity of values that created a calm and harmonious context for growth.

City growth was somewhat stunted during the depression years of the thirties but experienced industrial growth during the hot house years of World War II and the boom associated with pent-up consumer demand in the post war years. This boom was accompanied and fueled by immigration, mostly from Europe.

The establishment of the Dominion Conference of Mayors in 1935 was symptomatic of growth of Canadian cities during these years. In 1937, this organization fused with the Union of Canadian Municipalities to become the Canadian Federation of Mayors and Municipalities. This organization was renamed the Federation of Canadian Municipalities in 1976.

==== The cities ====
===== Metropolis: Montreal at its peak =====
Montreal had a population of 618,000 in 1921, which grew to 1.2 million in 1971.

The twenties saw many changes in the city and the introduction of new technologies continued to have a prominent impact. The introduction of the car in large numbers began to transform the nature of the city. The world's first commercial radio station, XWA began broadcasting in 1920. A huge mooring mast for dirigibles was constructed in St. Hubert in anticipation of trans-Atlantic lighter-than-air passenger service, but only one craft, the R-100, visited in 1930 and the service never developed. However, Montreal became the eastern hub of the Trans-Canada Airway in 1939.

Film production became a part of the city activity. Associated Screen News of Canada in Montreal produced two notable newsreel series, "Kinograms" in the twenties and "Canadian Cameo" from 1932 to 1953. The making of documentary films grew tremendously during World War II, thanks to the creation of the National Film Board of Canada, in Montreal, in 1939. By 1945 it was a major film production studio that had a staff of nearly 800 people and over 500 films to its credit, including two popular series of monthly propaganda films, "The World in Action" and "Canada Carries On". Other developments in the cultural field included the founding of Université de Montréal in 1919 and the Montreal Symphony Orchestra in 1934. The Montreal Forum, built in 1924 became the home ice rink of the fabled Montreal Canadiens hockey team.

Dr. Wilder Penfield, with a grant from the US Rockefeller Foundation founded the Montreal Neurological Institute at the Royal Victoria Hospital (Montreal), in 1934 to study and treat epilepsy and other neurological diseases. Research into the design of nuclear weapons was conducted at the Montreal Laboratory of the National Research Council of Canada during World War II.

In the post-war years Canada formalized its wartime shortwave radio broadcasting activities by the creation of Radio Canada International. At its establishment in 1945, this international radio broadcasting service had production facilities in Montreal and a huge shortwave transmitter site at Sackville, New Brunswick. Television was introduced to Canada by CBC, first in the French language by CBFT in Montreal on 6 September 1952. Radio-Canada established extensive production facilities for French-language programming, especially in the field of television drama. In the early seventies TVA also established a dynamic presence in this field.

The Norgate Shopping Centre, Saint-Laurent, Quebec (1949) and the Dorval Shopping Centre, Dorval, Quebec (1950), were the first shopping centres built in Canada. In 1951 the first St. Hubert BBQ restaurant opened its doors on St-Hubert street in Montreal.

The completion of the St. Lawrence Seaway, in 1959, the Trans-Canada Highway, in 1962, Autoroutes 20 and 40 in Quebec and Highway 401, in Ontario, in 1968 strengthened Montreal's connection to other Canadian cities and the rest of the continent. The construction of the Montreal Subway, in 1966 and Underground Montreal in the mid-sixties eased pedestrian movement in the downtown core and the suburbs. The World Fair, Expo 67 brought Montreal to the attention of the world as never before. La Ronde (amusement park) became Canada’s largest amusement park when it opened in 1967 as part of Expo ’67.

Canada's first heart transplant was performed on 31 May 1968, by Dr. Pierre Godin the Chief Surgeon at the Montreal Heart Institute, on patient Albert Murphy of Chomedy, Quebec a 59-year-old retired butcher suffering from degenerative heart disease. The operation took place about six months after the world's first, by Dr. Christiaan Barnard.

A number of important skyscrapers were built in the sixties including, Place Ville Marie (Royal Bank), 1962, the Canadian Imperial Bank of Commerce Tower, 1962, the Edifice Trust Royal (C.I.L. House), 1962 and the Hôtel Château Champlain, in 1967.

Cultural institutions such at La Presse and Le Devoir newspapers and the beautiful Place des Arts (1963) performing arts theatre, symbolized the vigour of the French language in the city as did the development of a very vibrant popular music and theatre scene in the sixties and seventies with noted performers including Robert Charlebois, Louise Forestier, Diane Dufresne, Claude Dubois, Rene Claude and Denise Pelletier. Further intellectual growth was symbolized by the founding of the Université du Québec in 1968.

The Montreal Forum was home to the iconic Montreal Canadiens hockey team which won five Stanley Cup victories in a row from 1955 to 1960 becoming in the process the most successful professional sports team in history up to that time. The star player of the team Maurice Richard gained a reputation that lives to this day.

However, the rise of the automobile put an end to streetcar manufacturing in the city. The conversion of the railways from steam to diesel in the 1950s resulted in the closure of Montreal's huge locomotive manufacturing facilities. Political turmoil arose with the mailbox bombings of the separatist Front de Liberation du Quebec in the 1960s. The construction of the Boulevard Metropolitaine in the 1960s, although it improved traffic low, divided the city along an east–west axis. The massive trench of the new north–south six-lane Boulevard Decaire divided the city east from west.

===== Toronto and Southern Ontario cities - waiting in the wings =====
These cities experienced strong growth during this period that would see them gain national prominence in the latter part of the century.

Toronto: Toronto gained considerable industrial, cultural and demographic strength from 1920 to 1970.

The industrial strength of Toronto area was reinforced by the establishment in 1918 of an auto production plant by General Motors in nearby Oshawa, where it produced Buicks, Oldsmobiles and Oaklands and by Studebaker Canada Ltd. which produced cars in Hamilton from 1946 to 1966. Steel for the production of these cars came from the nearby mills of Stelco and Dofasco in Hamilton and gasoline, from refineries in Sarnia. The familiar, Canadian Tire, began operations there in 1922 and has become one of Canada's largest retailers. The Trans-Canada Airway was extended to Toronto in 1939.

The founding of what would become the Toronto Symphony Orchestra in 1922 and the establishment of the CBC radio English-language radio network headquarters with its associated production facilities in the city in 1936 were signal cultural events.

Notable landmarks of the period featured the Royal York Hotel, built in 1929 and Maple Leaf Gardens home to the fabled Toronto Maple Leafs hockey team, completed in 1931. Important public works included the massive R.C. Harris Filtration Plant, in 1926 and the Queen Elizabeth Way, completed in 1939.

During the Second World War Toronto became an important centre for the production of weapons including the warplanes manufactured by de Havilland Canada and Avro Canada. Military vehicles were produced by General Motors in Oshawa. The Connaught Laboratories (Sanofi-Aventis) at the University of Toronto produced penicillin for wartime use.

Industrial capacity gained further strength from the establishment in the fifties, by the Ford Motor Company of Canada of a production plant in Oakville, which would eventually become a suburb of Toronto. The signing of the Auto Pact with the US in 1965 created massive investment in auto production facilities in Toronto and southern Ontario.

The University of Toronto Computer Centre, established in 1947, developed Canada’s first operational computer the University of Toronto Electronic Computer (UTEC) in 1951. This was followed by the purchase of FERUT (Ferranti University of Toronto) computer, by the Computer Centre in 1952.

The CBC owned and operated CBLT-TV, Canada's first English-language television station, with related production facilities, went on the air there on 8 September 1952. The first private television broadcaster, CFTO, began operation in 1961.

Toronto was home to the construction of a number of advanced aircraft in the post-war years including the Avro Canada Jetliner, the Avro CF-100 jet interceptor and the fabled Avro Arrow. However, the expense of the latter endeavor in the absence of a significant market forced the AVRO into bankruptcy in 1959.

Electric energy projects in the sixties and seventies included the Lakeview Generating Station, completed in Mississauga, in 1962 and the Nanticoke Generating Station (largest coal-fired plant in North America), in Nanticoke, Ontario, in 1978. In 1971 electricity produced from nuclear power became commercially available to Torontonians and other Ontarians from the large (ultimately 8-unit) Pickering station near Toronto, Ontario.

The field of transportation saw the completion of a number of significant works both local and national. Local works included the Toronto subway, in 1954 and the GO Transit rail system in 1967. The PATH system built in the sixties, allowed pedestrians to move about the downtown core using underground passages. National projects with Toronto as a hub or important destination included the Trans-Canada Gas Pipeline, 1959, the St. Lawrence Seaway, 1959, the Trans-Canada Highway, completed in 1962, and Highway 401 completed in 1968.

The Sunnybrook Plaza (1951) and York Mills, (1952), became the first shopping centres in the region. Skyscrapers of note included the Toronto Dominion Bank Tower in 1967, The Simpson Tower, 1968, the Royal Trust Tower, 1969.

By 1971 Toronto had a population of 2,630,000.

===== The rising east and west =====
Ottawa, Calgary, Edmonton and Vancouver would experience sustained growth but not enough to make them the metropolis.

Vancouver: In 1921, Vancouver had a population of 232,000.

The opening of the Panama Canal in 1914 solidified Vancouver's place as Canada's largest western city and the third largest in the country, a place that it holds to this day. The canal made it possible for ships to carry cargo from Vancouver directly to ports in Europe. Freight rates that favoured the use of eastern Canadian ports over Vancouver were eliminated in the twenties and port growth boomed. The Vancouver Harbour Commission was established in 1913 and the shipping activity centred around the Ballentyne Pier, built in 1923, which at the time was the most modern in the British Empire.

The rise of the automobile led to the construction of new bridges over False Creek including: the Granville Street Bridge, (1889 rebuilt 1954), the Burrard Street Bridge, 1932, and the Cambie Street Bridge, (1912 rebuilt 1984). Auto traffic to North Vancouver was facilitated by the construction of the first Second Narrow's Bridge in 1925 and by the completion of the Lion's Gate Bridge, in 1938, across the First Narrows.

Crime was a prominent feature of city life. Vancouver mayor L. D. Taylor practised an ¨open town¨ policy that sought to manage activities such as prostitution, bootlegging and gambling, by restricting them to racially oriented areas including Chinatown, Japantown, and Hogan's Alley. He was defeated in 1934 by Mayor McGeer who promised to clean up the city.

In 1931 the population of Vancouver stood at 347,000. In the twenties and thirties Vancouver became the western anchor of a number of national communication and transportation networks. These included the CNR National Radio Network, 1927, Canadian Radio Broadcasting Commission Radio Network, 1932, the Trans-Canada Telephone System, 1932, the Canadian Broadcasting Corporation Radio Network, 1936 and the Trans Canada Airway in 1938.

Cultural life received a boost from the establishment of the Vancouver Symphony Orchestra in 1919 and the opening of the Orpheum (Vancouver) theatre in 1927.

By 1941 the population had grown to 394,000. During World War II, the air base at Boundary Bay became an important centre for the training of heavy bomber crews. The city also featured prominently in the construction of ships for the war effort. Fear of an invasion by Japanese naval forces led to Canadian citizens of Japanese ancestry being sent to concentration camps in the BC interior 1942. Many of these citizens were from Vancouver.

In 1951 the population stood at 562,000 and further technologies became available. The Park Royal Shopping Centre, in West Vancouver, became the first in the city in 1950 and Empire Stadium, was built to host the 1954 British Empire Games. Vancouver became the western anchor of the new CBC national television network in 1958 and the western hub of the newly completed Trans-Canada Highway in 1962. The giant Tsawwassen Ferry Terminal, was built in 1959 for passenger and vehicle ferry service to southern Vancouver Island and the nearby Roberts Bank Superport coal terminal was finished in the late sixties. A second, Second Narrow's Bridge was built in 1960 and the W.A.C. Bennett Dam, was completed in 1967.

The establishment of the Queen Elizabeth Theatre in 1959 and of Simon Fraser University in 1965, enriched city cultural life. Canada’s first purpose-built auto racing track, the Westwood Motorsport Park was built in nearby Coquitlam, that same year. The first McDonald's restaurant outside the United States was opened in Richmond in 1967.

By 1971 Vancouver had a population of 1,000,000.

=== City in decline and subsequent revival - 1970–present ===
==== Trouble in the city ====
Canada's population stood at 21 million in 1971 and has grown to 33 million in 2008. City expansion has continued throughout this period.

However, Canadian cities have experienced a number of serious problems due largely to the fact that the increase in population has not been supported as it was earlier in the century. While private investment has largely continued apace during these years, public expenditures have not been able to match the increasing demand for public services, including, education, health, welfare, public transport and roads and other infrastructure. This is because the constitution, created 100 years before, was developed for a rural country and did not provide adequate taxing mechanisms for the municipal generation of revenue. Constitutionally, cities were creatures of the province. Entrenched resistance to change, especially at the provincial level, that would see more taxing power transferred to the cities, has prevented effective action to remedy this problem.

Furthermore, the social harmony and cohesion of values that characterized the golden age have also been eroded by the changing values of the indigenous increasingly secular, individualistic and materialistic population as well as the arrival of immigrants whose diverse views often conflict with those of their adopted country. Pollution, from industry and car exhaust has become a serious problem.

Importantly, the Auto Pact of 1965 and investments by the Big Three US car makers, General Motors, Ford and Chrysler have served to stimulate the growth of the cities of southern Ontario in much the same way that the CPR fuelled the growth of the cities of western Canada 60 years before.

==== Changing structures – urban sprawl and downtown decay ====
This era has been marked by urban sprawl. Population growth has been limited mostly to the suburbs and city boundaries have stretched far into what had been countryside mere decades earlier. Due to the extension of suburbia the provision of public services has become increasingly expensive as water systems, sewer systems and other structures have radiated from the city core.

Of particular note is the construction of superhighways throughout the sixties and seventies. These massive corridors while designed to move increasing volumes of auto traffic also served to physically divide cities. In Toronto Highway 401 divides the city north/south, the Don Valley Parkway(1966), east/west and the Gardiner Expressway(1966) separates the city core from Lake Ontario. In Montreal, the Autoroute Metropolitaine divides the city north/south and Boulevard Decarie, east/west. The Queensway in Ottawa divides the city north/south. The presence of cars has become so dominant that a casual observer seeing a city for the first time would assume that the primary inhabitant was the auto.

The displacement of the weight of the residential population from the city centre has begun to remove to market for downtown services and the downtown cores have begun to deteriorate. The construction of huge ¨ shopping centres¨ in suburbia has accelerated this process. In 2008 the Federation of Canadian Municipalities estimated that it would take $123 billion to restore and repair aging urban infrastructure across Canada.

Although there is deterioration in infrastructure, the kind of slums that characterize many cities in the third world and the cores of many US cities do not exist in Canada.

==== The cities ====
===== The new metropolis : Toronto and the Golden Horseshoe =====
During the seventies the population of Toronto surpassed that of Montreal. In 1971, the populations of the respective Census Metropolitan Areas (CMAs) for Toronto and Montreal stood at 2.7 million and 2.6 million. By 1981, Toronto's population of 3 million had surpassed Montreal's 2.8 million. In 2009 there were 5.5 million people in the Toronto area.

Factors for the growth of Toronto over Montreal included strong immigration, increasingly by Asians and people of African descent, the increasing size of the auto industry in Southern Ontario, due to the signing of the Auto Pact with the US in 1965, a calmer political environment (Quebec experienced two referendums on separation during these years, one in 1980 and the other in 1995), and lower personal income taxes than in Quebec.

Improved transportation facilities aided growth. Union Station (Toronto) provided a hub for passenger rail service in the busy Windsor Quebec corridor and a focus for the subway service. Highway 401 provided an artery for automobile traffic east and west. Toronto Pearson International Airport became Canada's largest and a massive new terminal building has been completed.

During this period, three of Canada's largest banks became headquartered in Toronto: the Royal Bank of Canada, the Toronto-Dominion Bank and the Canadian Imperial Bank of Commerce. These along with the Manulife Financial Corporation, Sun Life Financial Inc. and Toronto Stock Exchange form the financial district, the financial heart of Canada. Toronto also became the corporate capital of Canada, the majority of Canadian companies having their head offices there. Notable examples include George Weston Ltd., Onex Corp, Magna International Inc., Wal-Mart Canada Corporation and Brookfield Asset Management Inc.

Toronto strengthened its position as the cultural centre of English-speaking Canada during these years. The Globe and Mail and the National Post, two of Canada's most important newspapers have their head offices there. The new CBC Canadian Broadcasting Centre was completed in 1993 and became the corporation's control facility for English language broadcasting in Canada. Also in 1993 Ryerson Polytechnical Institute gained full university status and became, Ryerson Polytechnic University. Roy Thomson Hall became the home of the Toronto Symphony Orchestra in 1982. This along with the newly constructed Princess of Wales Theatre and the venerable Royal Alexandra Theatre now form the heart of the theatre district. Cultural institutions including the Art Gallery of Ontario and the Royal Ontario Museum have had their buildings renovated. The Four Seasons Centre became the new home of the Canadian Opera Company and National Ballet of Canada when completed in 2006. The Toronto International Film Festival, established in 1976, has become after Cannes, the most important in the world and now sports a new headquarters, the Bell Lightbox, opened in 2010. Film production has received a boost from the newly completed, Pinewood Toronto Studios, in the east end on the waterfront. Toronto has also been home to the Hockey Hall of Fame (1943), since 1961.

The changing high-rise downtown core provided visual evidence of growth. New skyscrapers included, the Royal Trust Tower, 1969, First Canadian Place, 1975, the CN Tower, 1975, Royal Bank Plaza, South Tower, 1977, the First Bank Tower, 1979, Scotia Plaza, 1988, the Sky Dome, 1989, the BCE Place–Canada Trust Tower, 1990 and the Bay Wellington Tower, 1990. New skyscrapers include: One King Street West, 2005, West 1, 2005, Harbourview Estates 2, 2005, Residences of College Park 1, Toronto, 2006, Quantum 2 (Minto Midtown), 2008, the Bay Adelaide Centre West, 2009, the RBC Centre, 2009, Success, 2009 and Montage, 2009. Canada's largest theme park, Canada's Wonderland opened in 1981.

Public administration was streamlined when the governments of Toronto and its five adjacent municipalities Etobicoke, North York, East York, York, and Scarborough were fused to form a "megacity" in 1998. The political heart of the City, Nathan Phillips Square is framed by Toronto City Hall, while the popular heart is focused on Sankofa Square with its fountains and multiple large screen video panels, located on Yonge Street at the north end of the Toronto Eaton Centre.

Rosedale, a suburb established in 1909 continues to be home to some of Canada's richest and most famous citizens.

However, Toronto faces problems common to large North American cities, ranging from pollution, to urban sprawl, to the deterioration of infrastructure, racial tension and inequality, increasing levels of violent crime, heavy traffic congestion, poverty and lack of public housing.

More importantly, recent economic developments have had a considerable negative impact on Toronto and the region. In 2007 the Canadian dollar reached par with the US dollar, causing a decline in the export of the region's manufactured products because of their relative increase in price. Furthermore, the increase in the cost of oil and gas created an additional cost burden for these same manufacturers, resulting in a substantial loss of manufacturing jobs due to plant cutbacks and closures. The simultaneous decline of the North American auto industry with its many factories in the region, due to an increasing inability to compete with Asian auto manufacturers, was accelerated by the increasing price of gasoline, which discouraged consumers from purchasing new cars.

This collision of multiple negative factors has hit the manufacturing and technological base of the region's prosperity very dramatically in recent years. The road to continued prosperity for Toronto lies in increased competitiveness through technological and managerial innovation.

===== Heavyweights =====
Montreal, population 3,500,000 and Vancouver, metro population 2,300,000 have become poles of attraction based on manufacturing and transportation.

Montreal - stagnation: The population of Montreal, a city with an attractive geographical location, has declined over the last thirty years, because of negative economic, social and political, and fiscal factors.

The weight of the Canadian economy has shifted south and west over the last three decades. This has been to the benefit of Toronto, which grew in part because of the Auto Pact signed in 1965, and Calgary, the population of which grew from 400 thousand in 1971 to 1.3 million in 2021, in large part because of the oil and gas industry. The shift has been to the detriment of Montreal.

Demographically the birth rate in Canada has fallen below replacement rate during this period. Other cities in Canada have relied on immigration for growth, but this option has not been available to Montreal for political reasons. Furthermore, the province of Quebec, in spite of vigorous efforts, has been unable to attract French-speaking immigrants in significant numbers from other parts of the world.

There was a net loss of mostly English-speakers from Montreal during these years.

Since the 1970s the government of Quebec has responded positively to a growing public demand for social programmes, which by the end of the century were some of the most generous in Canada. In order to finance these programmes, personal income tax in Quebec became the highest in Canada and remains so. This high level of tax has served to further discourage the net immigration to Montreal, from other provinces and from other countries.

The government of Quebec also instructed its provincial crown electric utility, Hydro-Québec, with headquarters in Montreal, to offer electricity to both domestic and industrial clients at below market rates.

The population of the Island of Montreal has evolved as follows during this period: (1971), 1,959,000, (1981), 1,760,000, (1991), 1,775,000, (2001), 1,812,000.

In spite of these factors the economy of Montreal was transformed in the latter part of the century. The heavy manufacturing of the earlier years was replaced by the high value added output of the aviation and pharmaceutical sectors. Notable companies in the former include, Bombardier, Bell Textron, Pratt & Whitney and CAE. The latter sector included Merck Frost and Pfizer. Montreal also remains home to a large number of corporate head offices including those of Power Corporation of Canada, the Bank of Montreal, BCE Inc., Alimentation Couche-Tard Inc., Hydro-Québec, Ace Aviation Holdings (Air Canada), Ultramar Ltd. and Metro Inc.

The downtown core did experience some significant construction including, the Tour du 1000 de la Gauchetière in 1991, Tour IBM-Marathon in 1992 and the Molson Centre, the new home of the Montreal Canadiens, in 1996.

The period began optimistically with the construction of the massive Mirabel Airport to the northwest of the city in 1975. However, this soon turned to disappointment, embarrassment and financial catastrophe as the new huge facility failed to attract traffic and became a sleepy industrial airport at the end of the century. This failure is both a symbol and a practical reflection of Montreal's decline during these years. The 1976 Olympics produced mixed results. They did focus the attention of the world on the city and were a sporting success. However, the stadium was not finished on time, and city of Montreal and the province were left with massive debts that were only paid off early in the new millennium.

The French language cultural output of the city has flourished over the last thirty years. Large volumes of French-language television drama for the Radio Canada, TVA and TQS networks are produced weekly. There is a flourishing domestic and foreign film production industry. Special events including the Montreal International Jazz Festival (1980), the Canadian Grand Prix and Just for Laughs (1983), have gained international fame. The greatest export of Montreal on the international scene is surely the Cirque du Soleil, which has several permanent shows around the world.

Organized crime has changed over the decades. Run mainly by Canadian families of Italian origin, these groups were pushed aside in the eighties by biker gangs. The Outlaws originally gained control of the illegal drug trade and prostitution but in the nineties a brutal turf war saw them replaced by the Hells Angels.

Vancouver: Since 1970 Greater Vancouver has grown dramatically with the help of immigration from Asia and from other parts of Canada. Throughout the period, immigrants from South Asia have arrived in large numbers and tended to settle in the south east suburbs, notably in rapidly growing cities like Surrey. Immigrants from South-East Asia, particularly China, Taiwan, Hong Kong, and Korea, have congregated more in the City of Richmond and on the south side of Vancouver proper. These communities are complex in that they include immigrants with considerable wealth whose influence has had considerable impact on the face of the urban landscape and conventional immigrants of more modest means who contribute to the region's workforce and small-scale capitalism, as well as generations now of children born and raised in the province.

The skyline of the city has reflected this growth with new structures including the 62 floor mixed use Living Shangri-La, the tallest building in the city, which opened in 2009.

Tourism has increased noticeably because the city has become the starting point for major cruise ship lines operating trips north through the Inside Passage.

The world's fair of 1986, Expo'86, focused the attention of the world on Vancouver. The fair was sited at the east end of False Creek which, in the thirty years after World War II, became an industrial eyesore. In the 1970s some of the land was repurposed for housing and the Granville Island Market complex; in the early 1980s still more land was reclaimed and used as the site for the construction of the facilities for the fair. At the same time a rapid transit system, SkyTrain, was built to facilitate the movement of pedestrians around the city. This system was subsequently expanded in the lead-up to the 2010 Winter Olympics. The whole of the area around False Creek has been the site of significant densification of housing, typified by the construction of luxury apartment and condominium towers on the north or Yaletown side and lower-profile condominiums on the south side which includes the Athletes Village built for the 2010 Winter Olympics.

While most Canadian cities are characterized by the presence of freeways through part of the downtown core, Vancouver is the exception for the city has, to this point, managed to keep roads of this type out of the city centre. Extensive changes to the regional freeway system are underway, including most notably a new bridge over the Fraser River at Port Mann to replace a 1960s structure. While Vancouver officially brands itself as a green city and does much to encourage rapid and conventional transit, pedestrianism, and cycling as alternatives to automobile travel, the larger urban region continues to depend heavily on the individual automobile.

Although Vancouver is a profoundly wealthy city with some of the highest housing prices in North America and, indeed, the world, it is also home to significant poverty and social dislocation. The old core of the city was long home to transient industrial workers who made seasonal use of 'single room occupancy' (SRO) hotels around Main Street and Hastings Street. Since the 1970s that neighbourhood has suffered economically to such a point that the Downtown Eastside (DTES) is often characterized as 'blighted'. It contains one of the country's highest concentrations of dedicated social housing and social services, and is home to INSITE, the nation's first safe-injection facility. Much of the poverty, transience, substance abuse, and survival sex trade in the neighbourhood has its origins in mental health issues, many of which became acutely visible at the end of mental health institutionalization in the 1980s. Demand for land in a city that is surrounded by mountains and water has increased pressure on the DTES and has generated conflict over the potential for displacement of long-term marginalized residents through 'gentrification.' These changes are rejuvenating aspects of the old downtown's economy while creating new challenges for individuals with complex health, social, and economic issues.

As of 2013, the City of Vancouver has a population of 603,000 and the Greater or Metro region has a population in excess of 2,300,000.

===== Contenders =====
Oil, national politics and high-tech have made Edmonton, Calgary and Ottawa, all cities with populations of 1,000,000, significant national urban centres.

===== Regional cities =====
Regina, Saskatoon, Winnipeg, Quebec City, Sherbrooke, Thunder Bay, Greater Sudbury, and Halifax are major regional centres. St John's and Saint John are smaller centres in Atlantic Canada. Whitehorse and Yellowknife are small and more isolated cities in the Canadian north, the serving as the capitals and largest cities of the Yukon and Northwest territories respectively.

== See also ==
- History of Canada
- History of urban planning
- List of largest Canadian cities by census
- Origins of names of cities in Canada
- Urban history
- Urban planning
