= Christian Shepherd =

A Christian Shepherd is a Pastor (derived from Psalm 23: The Lord is my Shepherd) in many Christian religions. Christian Shepherd may also refer to:

== Incorporeal ==
- God
- Jesus
- Holy Spirit
- Saint
- Angel

== Clergy ==
- Minister (Christianity)
- Priest
- Monk
- Bishop
- Archbishop
- Friar
- Deacon
- Archdeacon
- Chaplain
- Pope

== Fiction ==
- Christian Shephard
- Shepherd Book

== See also ==
- Shepherd (disambiguation)
