= Cedarvale station =

Toronto subway station

Cedarvale
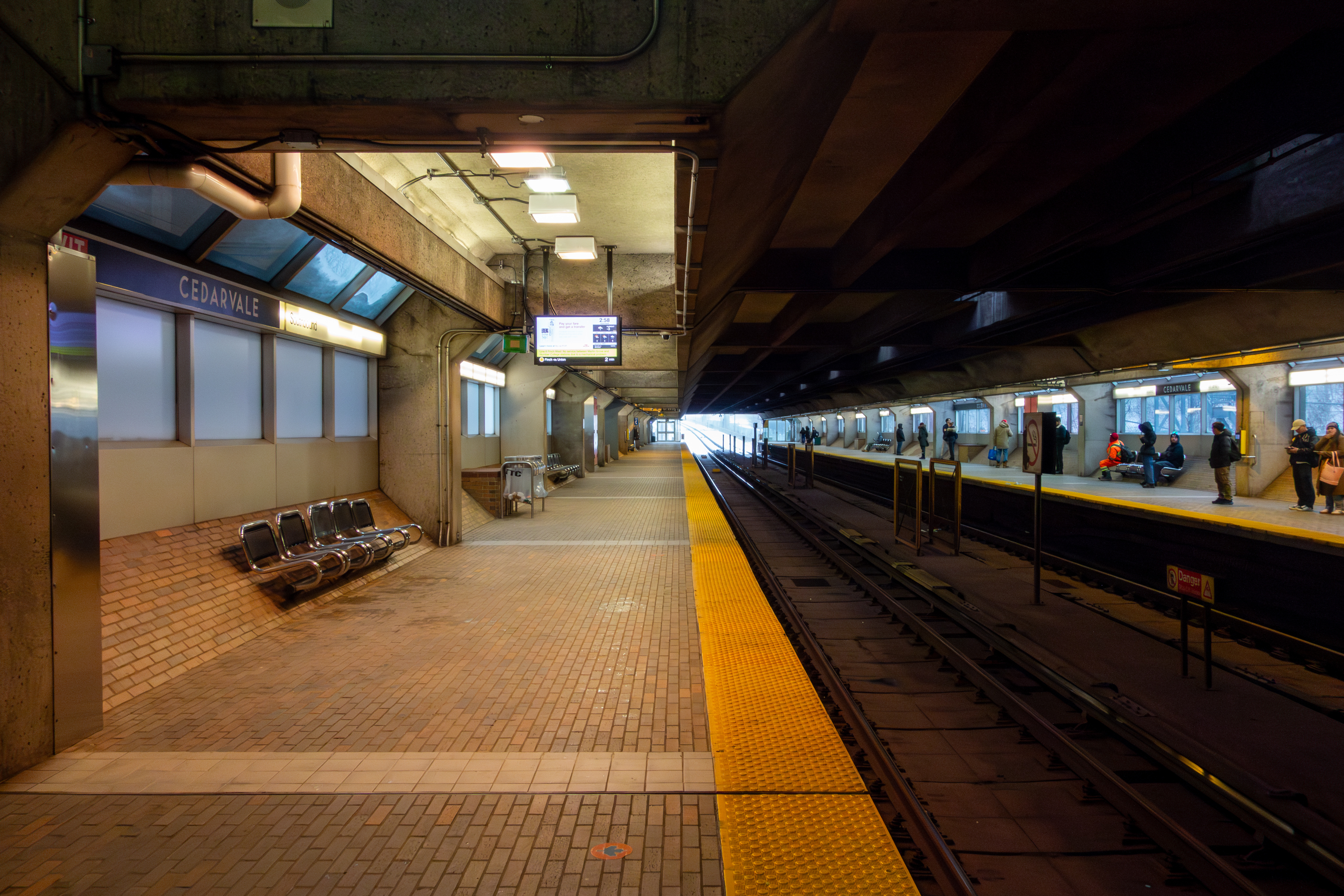
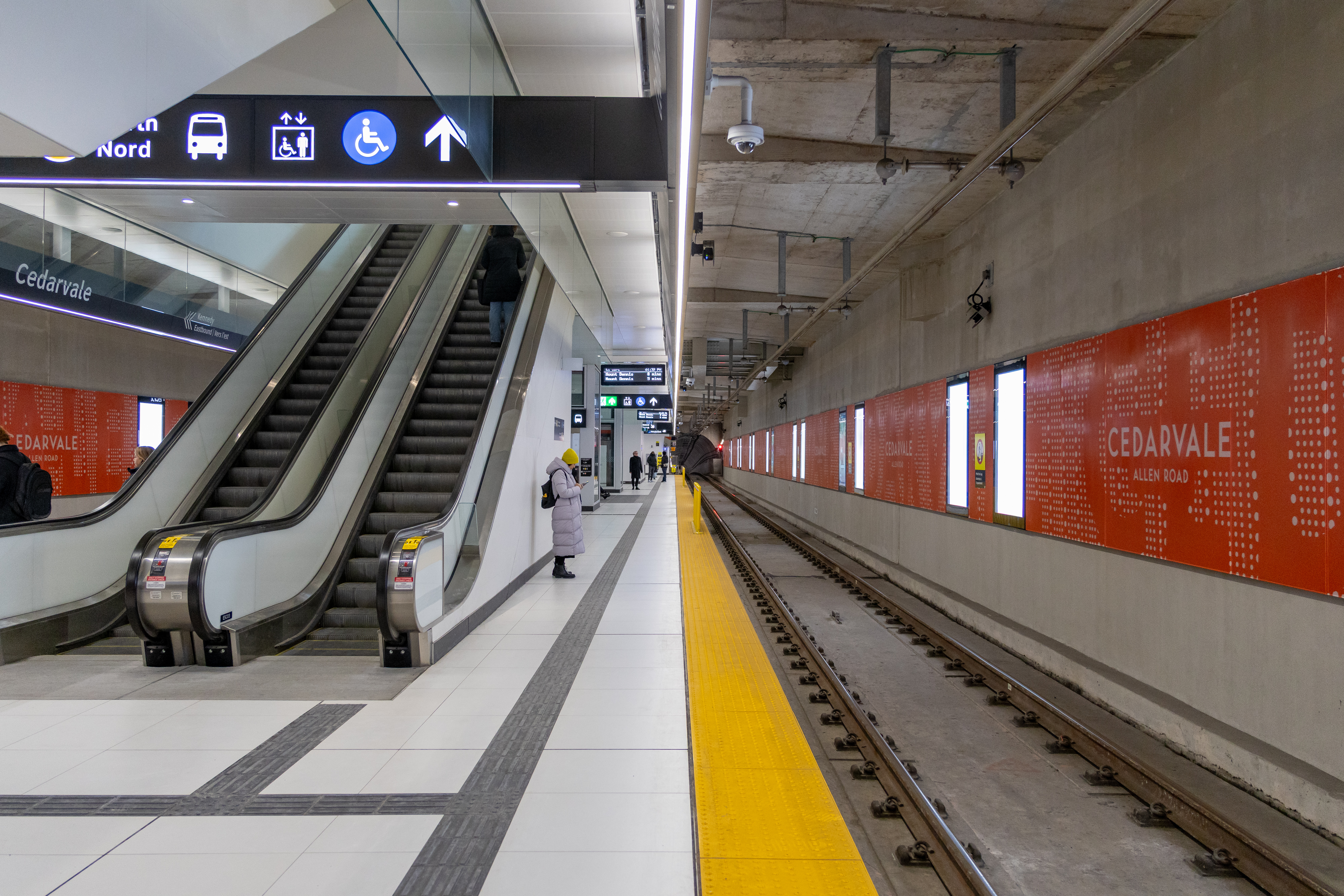
- Line 1 platform Line 5 platform

General information
- Location: 1300 Eglinton Avenue West; Toronto, Ontario; Canada
- Coordinates: 43°42′00″N 79°26′11″W
- Platforms: Line 1: Side platforms; Line 5: Centre platform
- Tracks: Line 1: 2; Line 5: 2
- Connections: TTC buses: 34 Eglinton; 63 Ossington; 90 Vaughan; 109 Ranee; 164 Castlefield; 334 Eglinton; 363 Ossington

Construction
- Structure type: Underground / at grade
- Accessible: Yes
- Architect: Arthur Erickson and Clifford & Lawrie (Line 1); NORR (Line 5)

Other information
- Website: Official station page

History
- Opened: Line 1: 28 January 1978; 48 years ago; Line 5: 8 February 2026; 9 months ago
- Rebuilt: 2025
- Former names: Eglinton West (1978–2025)

Passengers
- 2023–2024: 13,982
- Rank: 50 of 70

Services
Preceding station	Toronto Transit Commission	Following station
Glencairn towards Vaughan	Line 1 Yonge–University	St. Clair West towards Finch
Oakwood towards Mount Dennis	Line 5 Eglinton	Forest Hill towards Kennedy
Track layout
and Allen Road
Location

Cedarvale (formerly Eglinton West) is a Toronto subway station in Toronto, Ontario, Canada. It serves as an interchange station for Line 1 Yonge–University and Line 5 Eglinton. It is located in the median of Allen Road on the north side of Eglinton Avenue West.

The station opened in 1978 as Eglinton West on Line 1 and was renamed Cedarvale in 2025 in preparation for the opening of Line 5. In 2026, the station became an interchange with the opening of Line 5, following over 10 years of construction to build the line and expand the station with three new entrances.

== Description ==
The station building is located on the north side of Eglinton Avenue West between the entry and exit ramps for Allen Road. The station currently has two levels: street level and the platform level for Line 1 trains. The station's pedestrian entrance, the station concourse and a bus terminal are all located at street level. The bus terminal, located in a fare-paid area, surrounds the concourse area with bays on three of its four sides.

Shortly before the opening of Line 5 Eglinton, three more station entrances were opened on 16 November 2025: one just east of the Allen Road entry ramp, another just west of the Allen Road exit ramp, and one on the south side of Eglinton Avenue just west of Everden Road. The existing entrances were retained for direct access to the bus terminal for walk-in patrons not riding the subway.

The Line 5 tunnel and platform passes under the Line 1 platforms. Above the Line 5 platform level, there is an underground concourse, constructed in conjunction with Line 5, divided in two sections by a gap where the Line 1 tracks cross. The Line 5 platform is subtitled Allen Road under the station name, although there is no equivalent Eglinton Avenue subtitling for the Line 1 platforms despite the station being renamed only two months prior to Line 5 opening to reflect its new role as an interchange.

=== Architecture ===
==== Line 1 Yonge–University ====
The Line 1 station was designed by Arthur Erickson and Clifford & Lawrie. The main ticketing and concourse area at surface level is sheltered by an exposed concrete space frame supported by eight circular columns. The concrete ceiling is, in effect, a large slab and overhangs the entrance. With a glass curtain wall, it appears to float. Inside, it is coffered throughout the station, with skylights in certain areas, allowing for increased penetration of natural light. The station's design makes use of sandblasted concrete and brick wall finishes extensively, distinguishing it from most stations on Line 1 and Line 2 Bloor–Danforth, where tiles are predominant.

As the north end of the station is in Allen Road's median, the Line 1 platform level is partly built at surface level. Designers took advantage of this and added windows at platform level. The northbound platform has regular windows, allowing for a view onto Allen Road, while windows on the opposite platform were frosted during construction of the aborted Eglinton West line in 1994. This combination of window treatments allows transit riders to view cars speeding onto Allen Road's northbound expressway lanes, while blocking views of cars stuck in traffic approaching Eglinton Avenue, where the expressway – originally planned to continue south to downtown – ends.

During July 2009, the TTC installed an $850,000 green roof over the northern end of the station to reduce maintenance costs, increase the lifespan by 40 to 50 years, reduce the heat island effect by lowering the temperature of the surrounding area by a few degrees, and to reduce runoff. The TTC had to repair the roof anyway, since it had been leaking since 2000. The plants atop the 835-square-metre (8,990 sq ft) roof are low-maintenance sedums.

==== Line 5 Eglinton ====
The Line 5 additions were designed by NORR, following an architectural concept designed by architects gh3* from Toronto and Daoust Lestage Lizotte Stecker from Montreal. Two new entrances were built, one on the east side and one on the west side of Allen Road. As with other stations on Line 5, architectural features includes natural light from large windows and skylights, steel structures painted white, and orange accents (the colour of the line).

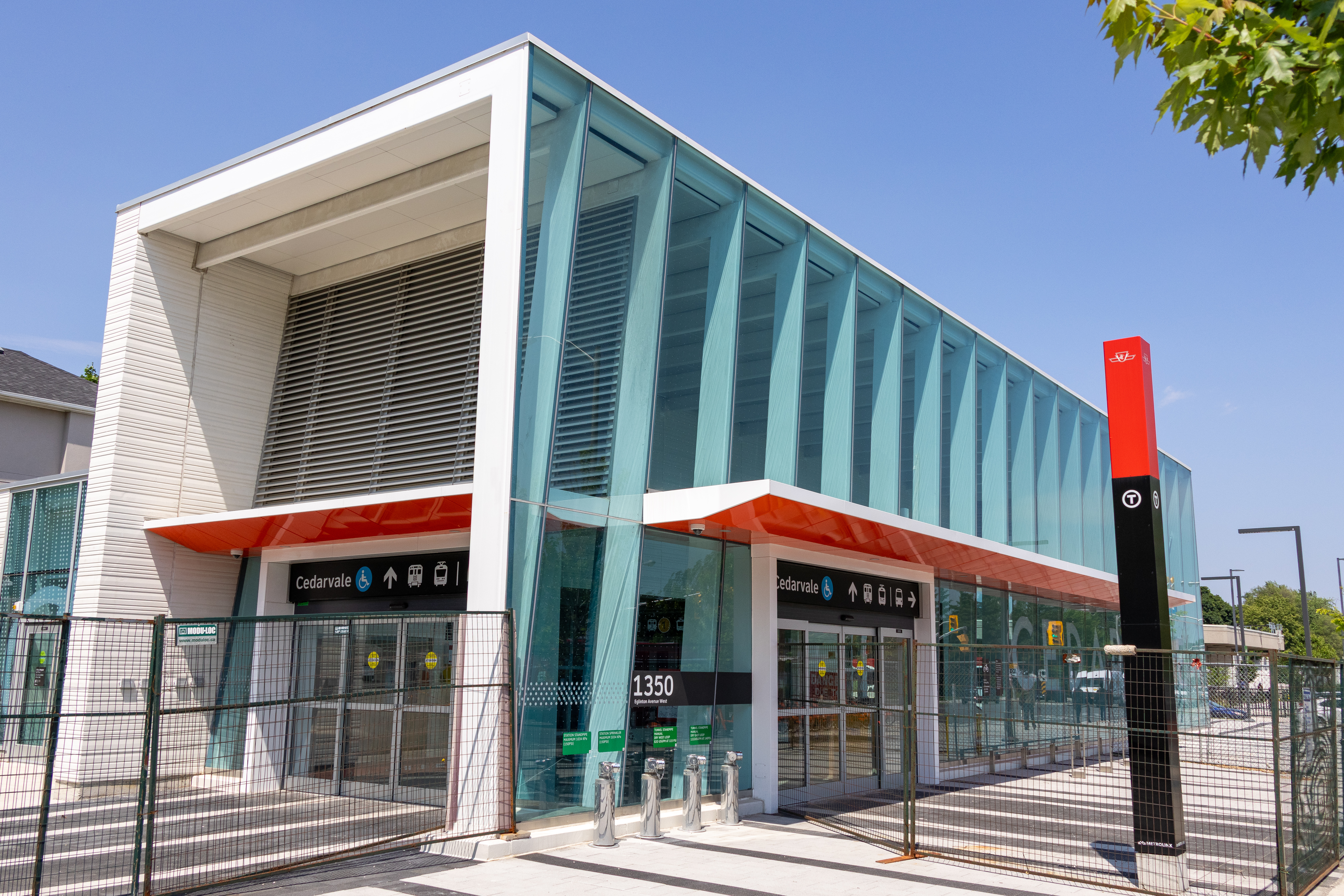
New station main entrance built as part of the Line 5 Eglinton project

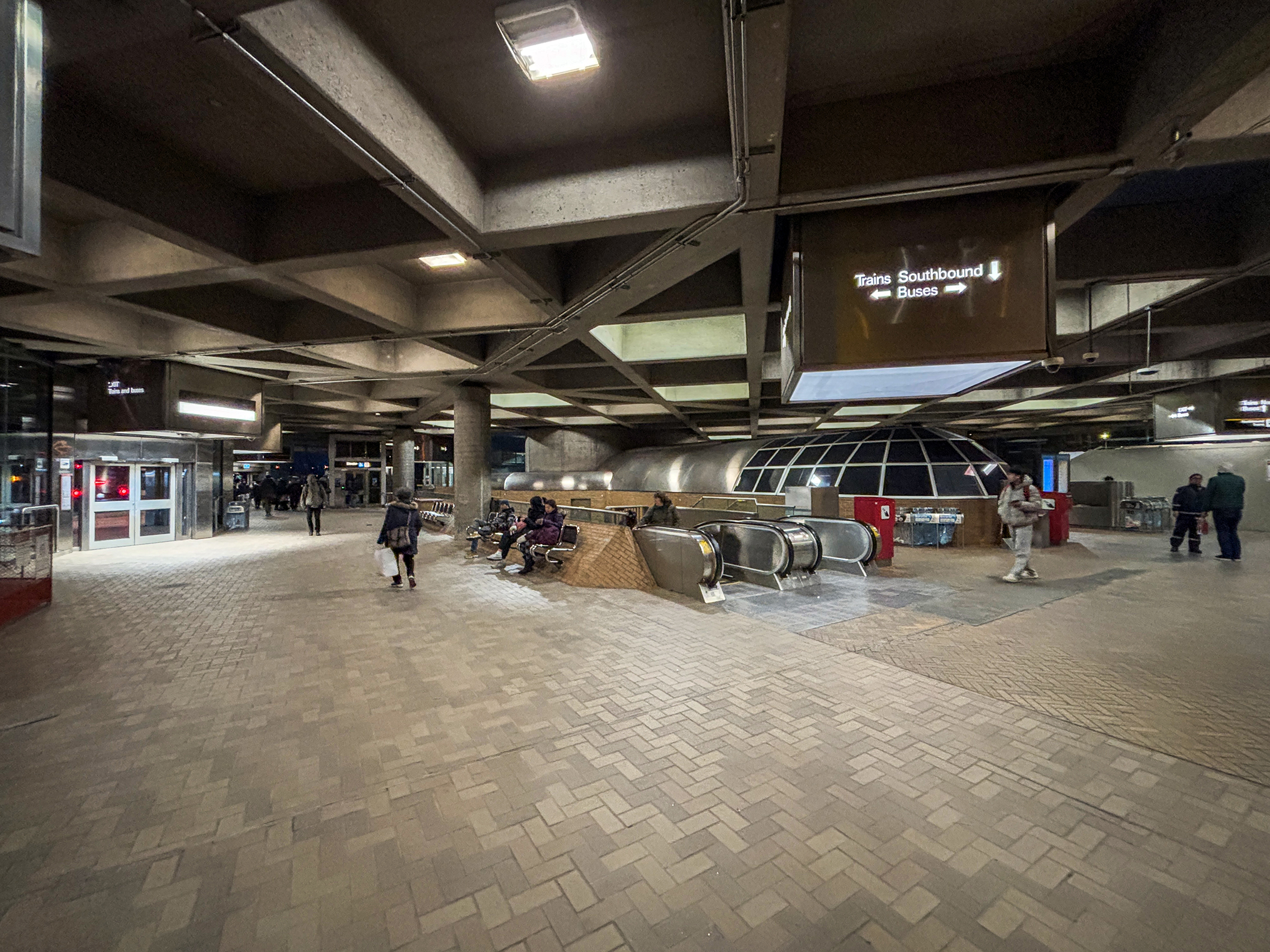
Cedarvale station concourse

=== Artwork ===
The station features two artworks. Facing each other at the Line 1 platforms, is Summertime Streetcar by Gerald Zeldin – an enamel mural of a montage of PCC streetcars from differing perspectives. The artwork is two storeys high and is located in the appropriately high-ceiling section of the platform level. In the Line 5 concourse, Super Signals by Douglas Coupland consists of aluminum panels with brightly coloured concentric circles against a background of black and white diagonal lines. The artwork is an exaggeration of traditional wayfinding graphics. Super Signals was installed as part of a program to install artworks at major interchange stations along Line 5 Eglinton.

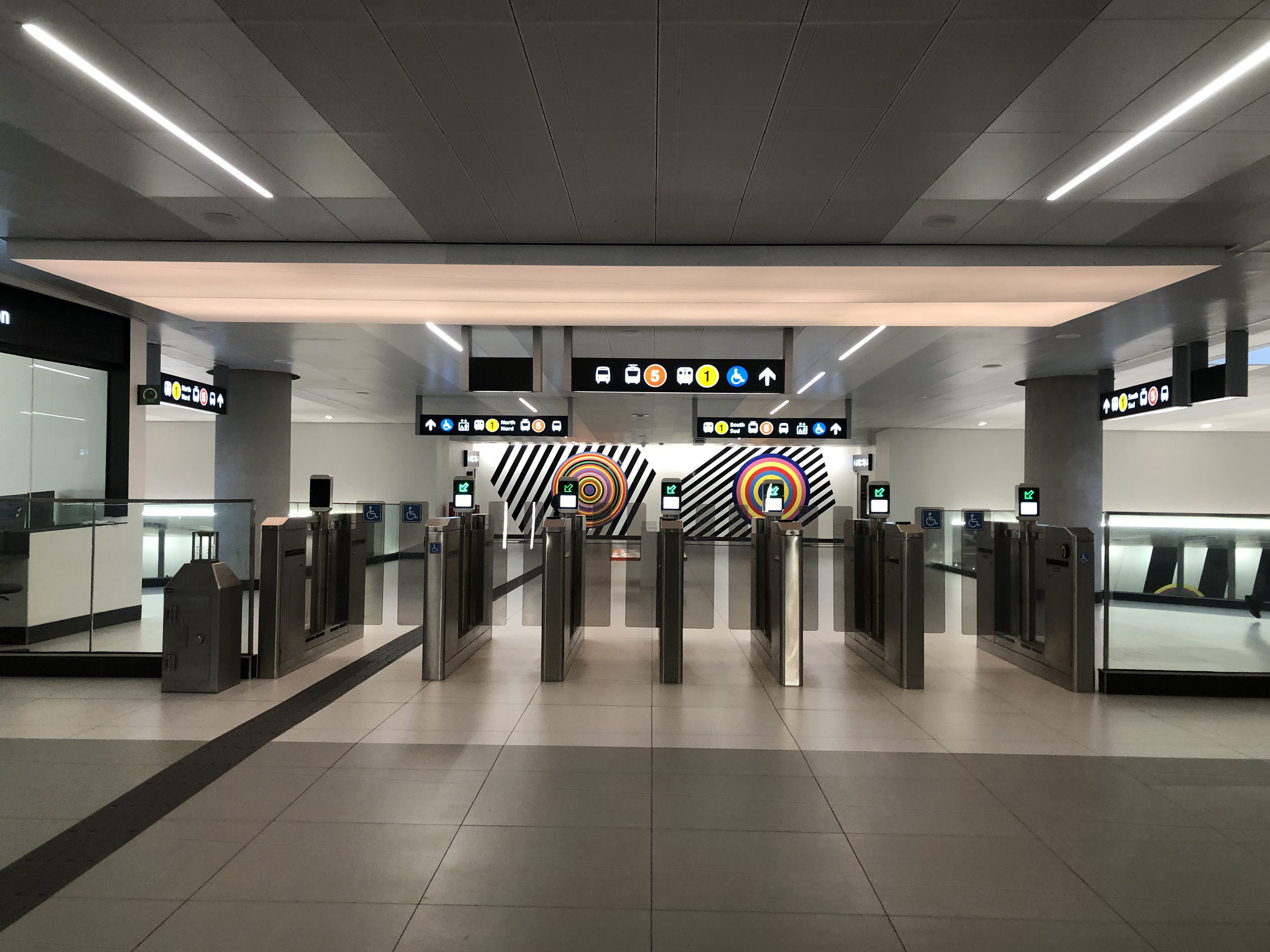
Cedarvale station new concourse level with Super Signals in the background

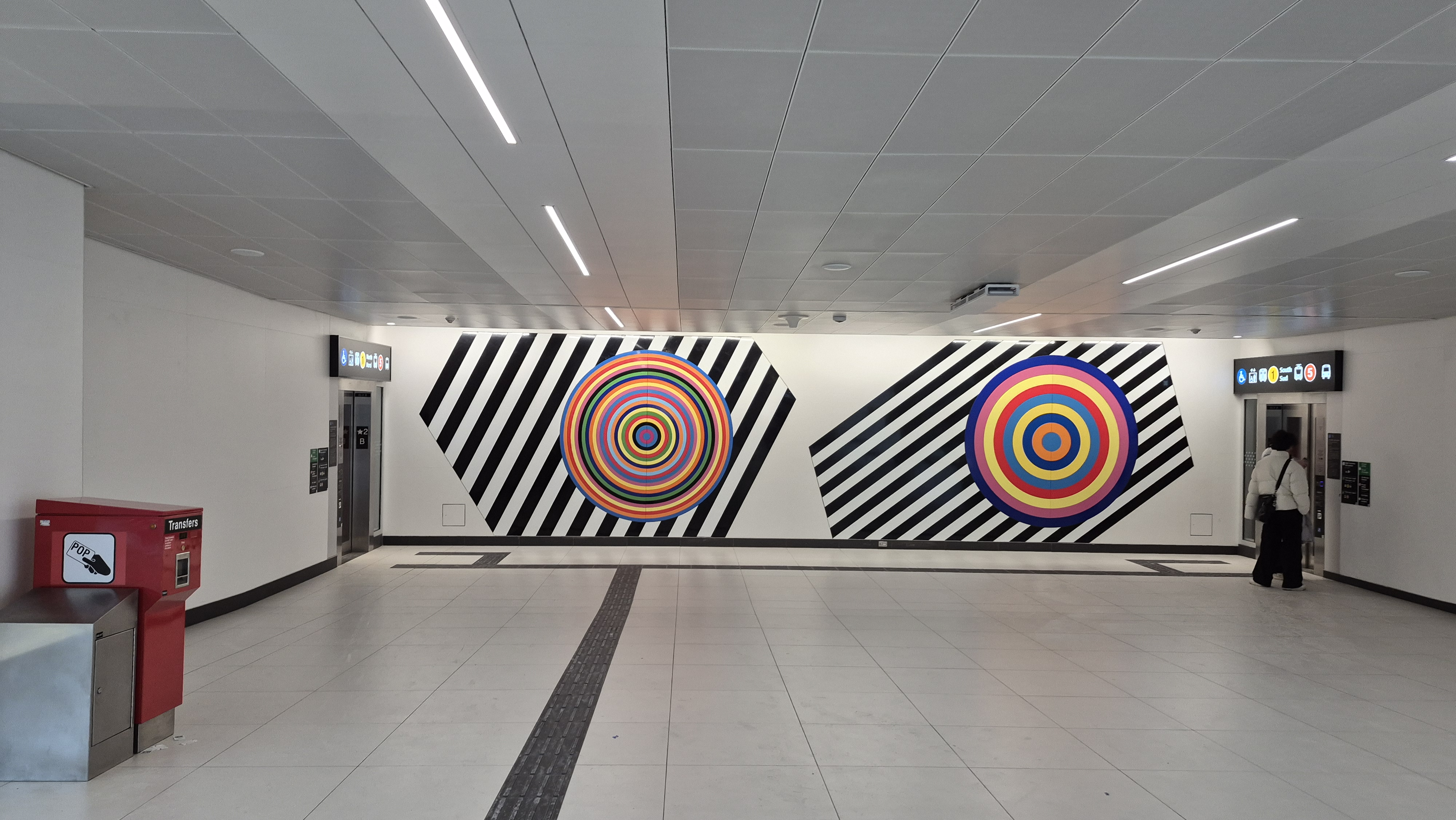
Closer view of Super Signals by Douglas Coupland in the Line 5 portion of the station

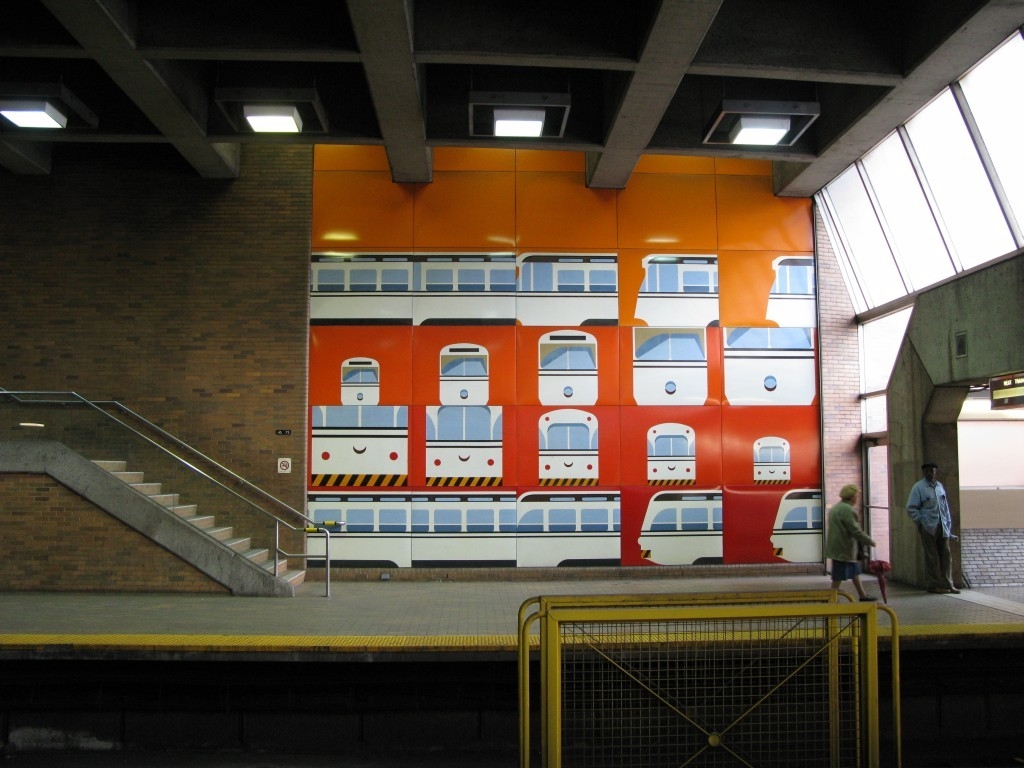
Summertime Streetcar at the Line 1 platforms

== Infrastructure in the vicinity ==
South of the station, Line 1 continues underground below Everden Road to reach the Cedarvale Ravine, then continues southeast below the ravine. Moving northward, tracks continue on the surface, in the median of Allen Road.

On Line 5, there is a diamond crossover east of the station to reverse LRT trains.

== History ==
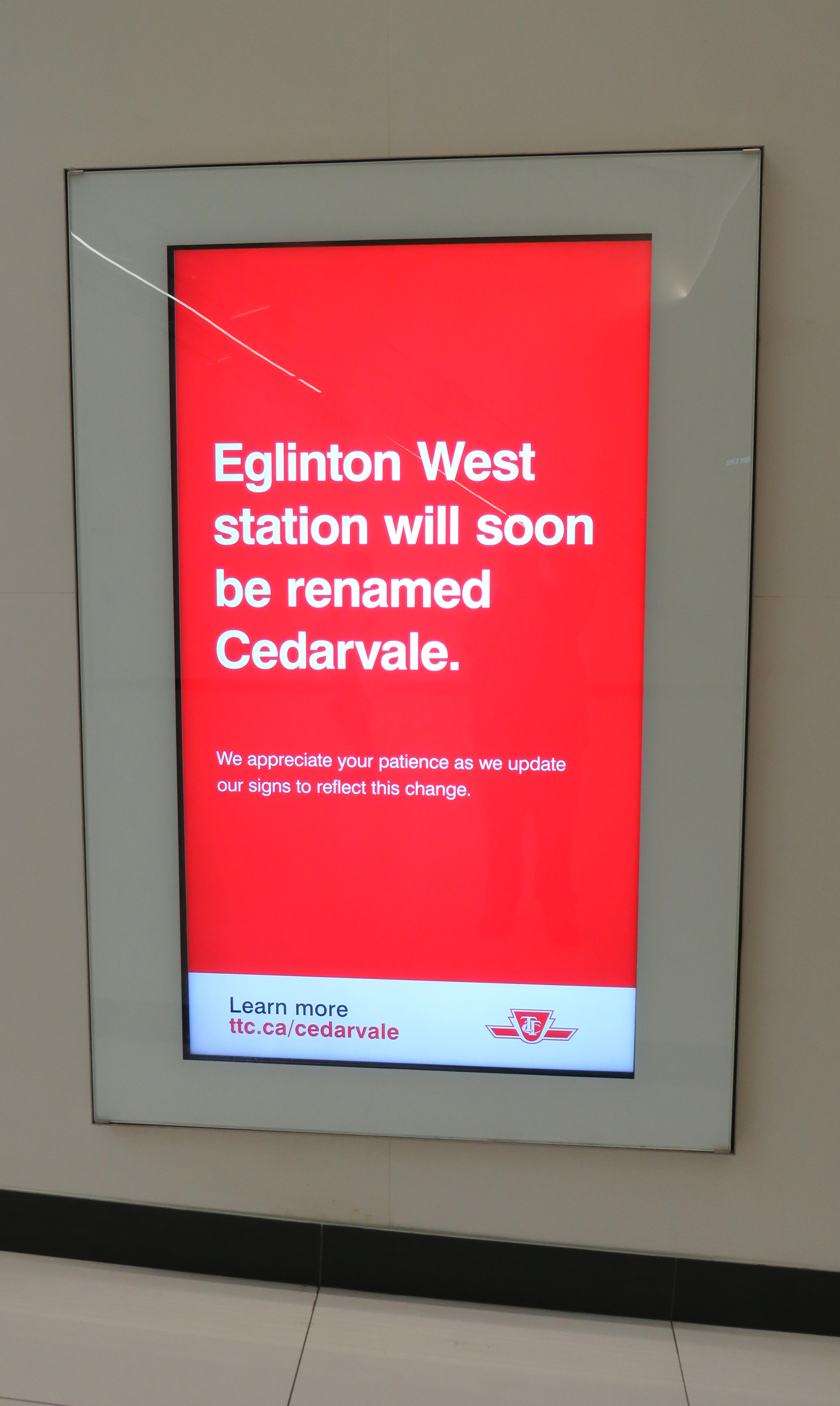
Sign in the station in November 2025 advising of the name change to Cedarvale

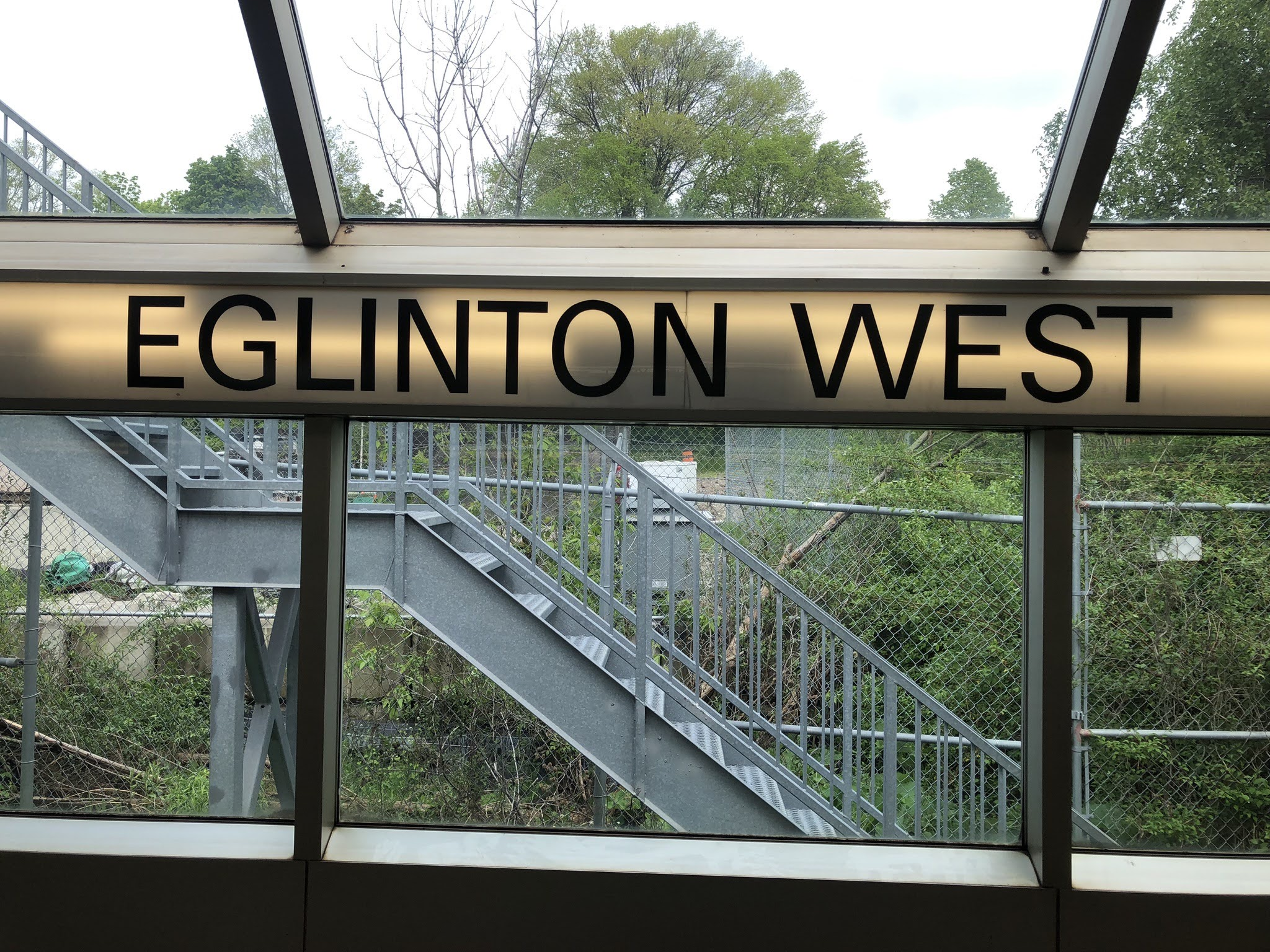
The original Eglinton West name in Univers lettering on the surface portion of the Line 1 platform

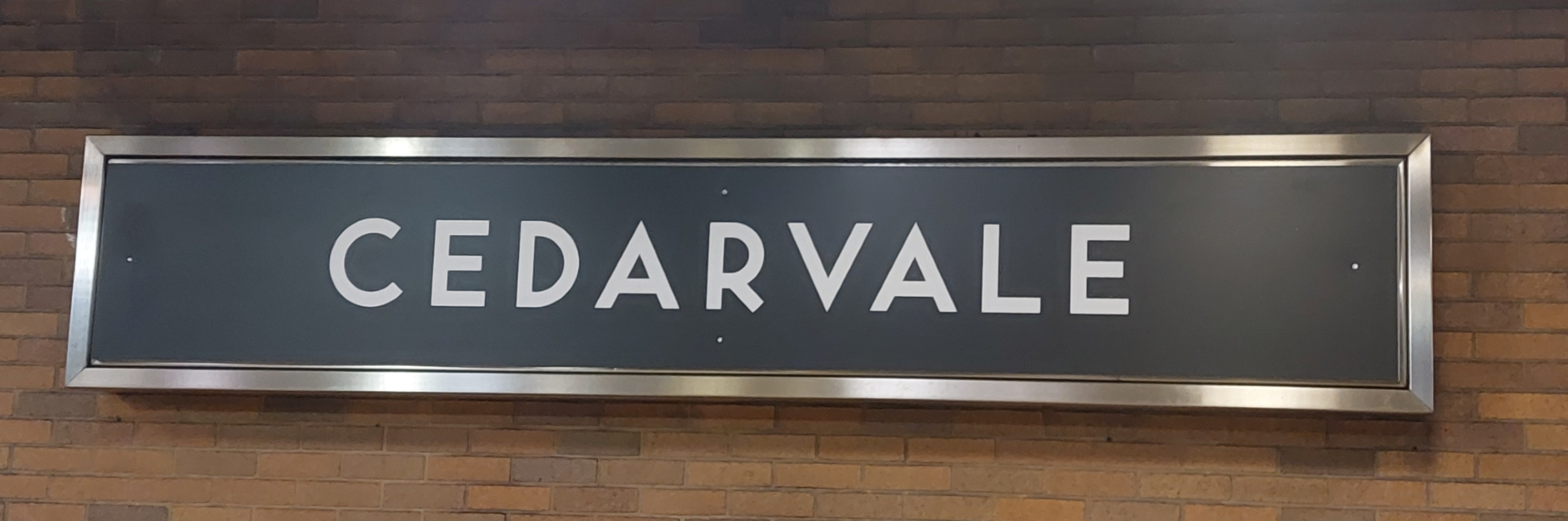
The Cedarvale station name in white-on-black Toronto Subway lettering in the underground area of the platform

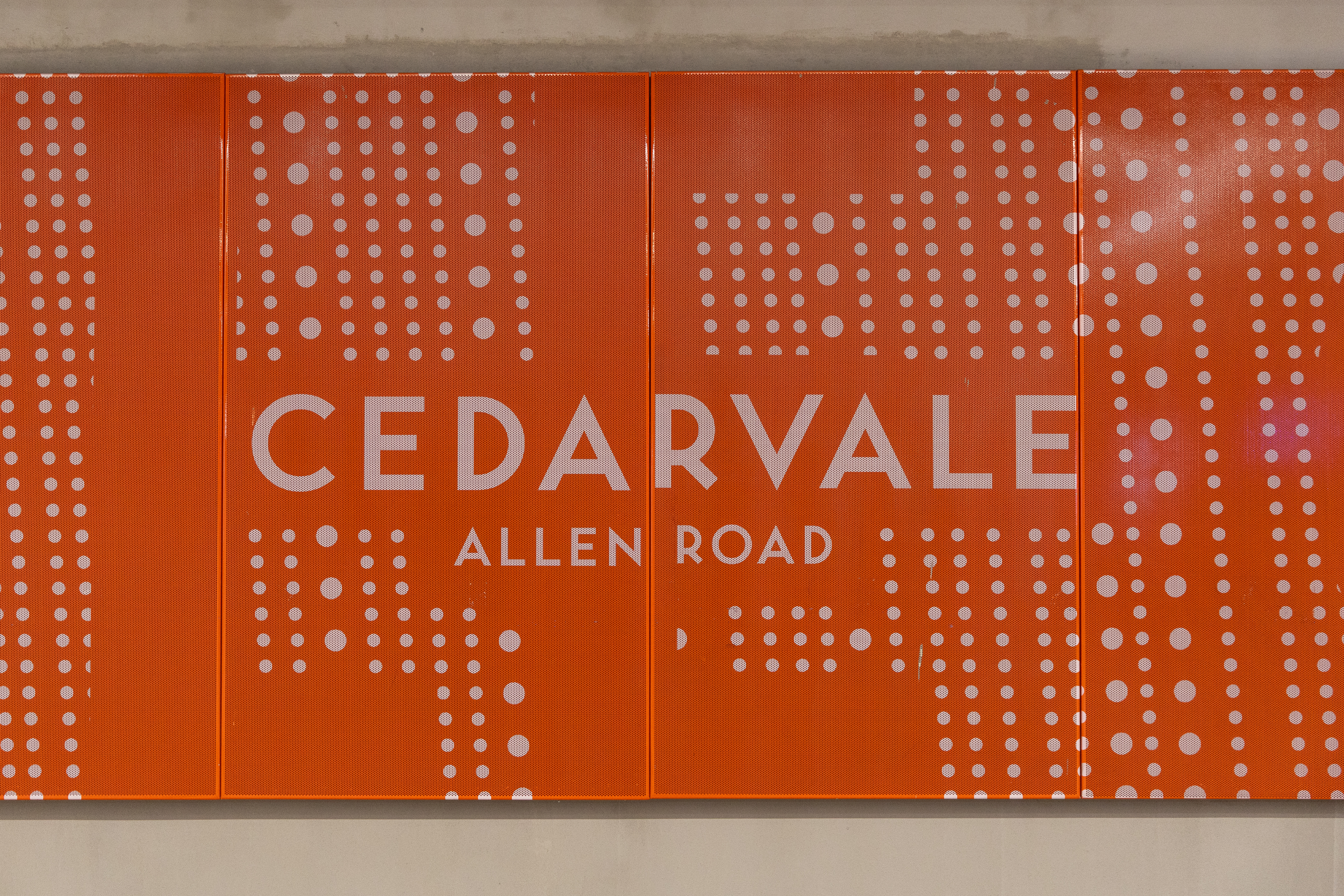
The station name on the Line 5 platform

The station opened as Eglinton West in 1978 on the Spadina subway line, an extension of Line 1's western branch from St. George to Wilson stations.

Eglinton West had been planned to be an interchange station as part of an earlier proposed subway line named the Eglinton West line. This was one of the three proposed subway lines in the Network 2011 plan created in 1985 by the Toronto Transit Commission. Construction started in 1994 but was halted when the project was cancelled in 1995 after the election of a Progressive Conservative government led by Mike Harris, and the excavation that had started for the lower station (dubbed "Allen") was backfilled.

Since October 2005, the station has been wheelchair accessible.

In December 2012, commuter parking lots formerly located east and west of the station building on the north side of Eglinton Avenue were taken out of service, leaving no immediately adjacent parking. The lots were used as staging areas for the tunnel boring machines (TBMs) during the construction of Line 5 Eglinton. On the weekend of 18 and 19 April 2015, the TBMs Dennis and Lea were extracted from the east-side staging area and then transported on a specialized heavy-load trailer to relaunch from the west-side staging area. Both staging areas became the location of two new station entrances.

On 16 November 2025, the additional station entrances constructed as part of Line 5 were opened. With these entrances open, work also began to gradually change the name from Eglinton West to Cedarvale (named after the nearby Cedarvale neighbourhood) in advance of the station becoming an interchange with Line 5. The name change officially took effect on 7 December 2025, and service on Line 5 began on 8 February 2026.

== Nearby landmarks ==
Nearby landmarks include the York–Eglinton BIA, Little Jamaica, and the Oakwood Village and Humewood–Cedarvale neighbourhoods.

== Surface connections ==
TTC routes serving the station include: (Note: When the subway is closed, buses do not enter the station but service nearby stops.)

Cedarvale station surface transit connections
Bay number	Route	Name	Additional information
1	Spare		
2	Spare		
3	Spare		
4	34	Eglinton	Eastbound to Kennedy station
4	Wheel-Trans		
5	90	Vaughan	Southbound to St. Clair West station
6	63A	Ossington (Note: When the station opened in 1978, route 63 Ossington served the station with trolley buses, which looped around the station building. Coincident with the station opening, the route was extended from its prior terminus at Oakwood and Eglinton Avenues. The route ran south to the loop at King Street. In 1992, service was changed to diesel buses and the overhead wires were removed.)	Southbound to Liberty Village
7	34	Eglinton	Westbound to Mount Dennis station
8	109B	Ranee	Northbound to Neptune Drive via Marlee Avenue and Flemington Road
8	109C	Ranee	Northbound to Neptune Drive via Marlee Avenue and Varna Drive
8	164	Castlefield	Westbound to Mount Dennis station via Keelesdale station
N/A	334A	Eglinton	Blue Night service; eastbound to Kennedy station and westbound to Renforth Drive and Pearson Airport (On-street connection)
N/A	334B	Eglinton	Blue Night service; eastbound to Finch Avenue East and Neilson Road via Morningside Avenue and westbound to Mount Dennis station (On-street connection)
N/A	363	Ossington	Blue Night service; southbound to Exhibition Loop (On-street connection)

== See also ==
- Toronto Transit Commission
- Eglinton West subway
