= Sheppard =

Sheppard can refer to:

== Places ==
- Sheppard, Wisconsin, an unincorporated community, United States
- Sheppard Avenue in Toronto, Canada
  - Line 4 Sheppard, a subway line
  - Sheppard West (TTC), formerly Downsview, subway station
  - Sheppard-Yonge (TTC), formerly Sheppard, subway station
- Kate Sheppard House, the historic home of civil rights campaigner Kate Sheppard
- Sheppard Air Force Base in Texas, United States

== Other ==
- Sheppard (name)
- Sheppard (band), an Australian Brisbane-based rock band
  - Sheppard (EP)

== See also ==
- Shepherd (disambiguation)
- Shepard (disambiguation)
