= Shepard =

Shepard may refer to:

- A common misspelling of shepherd
- Alan Shepard, American astronaut and member of the Apollo 14 Moon mission
- Shepard, Alberta, Canada
- Shepard, Missouri, a ghost town
- Shepard (name)
- Shepard tone, a sound consisting of a superposition of sine waves separated by octaves
- Shepard Settlement, New York
- Shepard Industrial, Calgary
- Shepard's Citations, a citation index of legal resources
- Shepard's method, a form of inverse distance weighted interpolation
- George F. Shepard House, a historic home in Omaha, Nebraska
- Blue Origin New Shepard, a crewed rocket that is being developed as a commercial system for suborbital space tourism.
- Shepard State Park, a state park in the U.S. state of Mississippi
- Commander Shepard, the protagonist of the Mass Effect video game series

== See also ==
- Shepherd (disambiguation)
- Sheppard (disambiguation)
- Sepharad, a Jewish term for Spain
