= Shepherd (disambiguation) =

A shepherd is a person who herds sheep.

Shepherd or The Shepherd may also refer to:

== Arts and entertainment ==
=== Film and television ===
- Shepherd (film), a 2021 British horror drama
- The Shepherd (2023 film), a British drama short film
- The Shepherd (2026 film), an upcoming American horror thriller film
- The Shepherd: Border Patrol, a 2008 American action film
- "The Shepherd" (Once Upon a Time), a TV episode

=== Other uses on arts and entertainment ===
- The Shepherd (novella), a 1975 novella by Frederick Forsyth
- The Shepherd (poem), a 1789 poem by William Blake
- "Shepherd", a song by Genesis on Genesis Archive 1967–75 and Extra Tracks 1970–1975

== People ==
- Shepherd (name), including a list of people and fictional characters with the name or its variants
- Baron Shepherd, a title in the peerage of the United Kingdom
- Pastor, the leader of a Christian congregation
- Biblical shepherds, characters in the Gospel of Luke
  - Annunciation to the shepherds
  - Adoration of the Shepherds

== Places ==
=== United States ===
- Shepherd, Michigan
- Shepherd, Montana
- Shepherd, Texas
- Shepherd Crest

=== Elsewhere ===
- Shepherd Islands, Vanuatu
- 23060 Shepherd, an asteroid

== Other uses ==
- Shepherd Building Group, a British modular building company
- Shepherd Center, a private hospital in Atlanta, Georgia, U.S.
- Shepherd dog or sheep dog, breeds of dogs used to raise sheep
- Shepherd School of Music, at Rice University, Houston, Texas, U.S.
- Shepherd University, in Shepherdstown, West Virginia, U.S.

== See also ==
- Sheepherder (disambiguation)
- Shepherding (disambiguation)
- Shepard (disambiguation)
- Sheppard (disambiguation)
- German Shepherd, a breed of dog
- The Heavenly Shepherd, the Babylonian name for the constellation Orion (constellation)
- Justice Shepherd (disambiguation)
- The Shepherd Express, an alternative weekly newspaper published in Milwaukee, Wisconsin
- Shepherd Hall, Wheeling, West Virginia, U.S., a house on the National Register of Historic Places
- Shepherd moon, a small natural satellite
- Shepherd Sisters, a 1950s vocal quartet
