= Eglinton West line =

Cancelled subway line in Toronto

The Eglinton West line was a proposed east–west rapid transit line in Toronto, Ontario, Canada, whose construction began in 1994 but was cancelled in 1995. It was to start from the existing Eglinton West station (now Cedarvale) on the Toronto Transit Commission's Yonge–University–Spadina line, travel underneath Eglinton Avenue West, and terminate at Black Creek Drive in its initial phase.

City of York mayor Fergy Brown, Metro Toronto chairman Alan Tonks, Ontario premier Bob Rae, Ontario minister of Transportation Gilles Pouliot, and TTC chair Mike Colle broke ground on the project in a ceremony on August 25, 1994, at Eglinton Avenue and Black Creek Drive; however, work was halted in 1995 after Mike Harris and the Progressive Conservative Party of Ontario won the 1995 Ontario general election and cancelled the project. The excavation under Eglinton West station was subsequently backfilled.

A new proposal for a transit line along Eglinton Avenue was conceived in 2007 as part of Transit City. It opened in 2026 as Line 5 Eglinton.

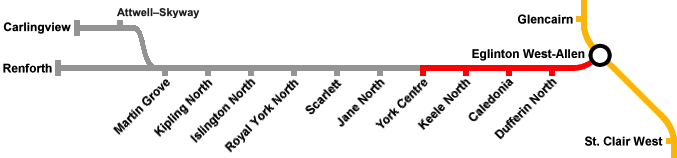
A schematic of the Eglinton West line. Phase 1 between York Centre station and Eglinton West station is shown in red.

== Planning history ==
In 1985, TTC's expansion planning report entitled Network 2011 proposed the Eglinton West line as a busway, not a subway. The busway would have been the most cost-effective alternative since Eglinton West corridor sits in the vacant Richview Expressway corridor, though in the future it could be expanded to a subway if ridership warranted.

Though the cities of Etobicoke and York strongly supported the concept of an Eglinton rapid transit line, as did the Region of Peel, they were unsatisfied with the prospect of a busway. There was some political jealousy over the fact that North York had made the Sheppard subway a priority and Etobicoke and York argued that their transportation needs had similar importance. In 1986, the 2011 Network plan was initiated, with the Eglinton West corridor as a subway. On Metro Council, Etobicoke and York formed an alliance that argued that the Eglinton rapid transit line be built as a subway from the start. In 1994, when Premier Bob Rae agreed to fund the subway projects, they decided to spread the funding throughout Metro Toronto to appease residents of both sides, which would have resulted in two truncated subway lines instead of a single complete line at least initially.

The line was cancelled upon the election of Progressive Conservative Mike Harris in 1995, and the TTC shifted its expansion priorities away from Eglinton West to projects such as extending the Spadina subway to York University and Steeles Avenue, the completion of the Sheppard subway to Victoria Park Avenue and Scarborough City Centre, and improvements to major bus and streetcar routes to create a network of "surface rapid transit" routes (including on Eglinton Avenue).

=== Eglinton Crosstown plan ===
The TTC's Transit City plan, which was announced in 2007, included a light rail line across Eglinton called the Eglinton Crosstown LRT. This line was to have been built grade-separated (and mostly underground) between approximately Weston Road and Laird Drive, which would effectively create an Eglinton "subway" but would use LRT vehicles rather than subway trains. A leaked copy of a Metrolinx report in 2008 indicated the organization may have wished to revive the Eglinton subway line as opposed to the light rail option; however, in April 2009, the province and the city agreed on funding to build this as an LRT line.

Mayor Rob Ford announced the cancellation of Transit City on the day he took office in 2010. Transit City, including the Eglinton Crosstown line, was then reinstated, along with a Finch LRT line and the Sheppard LRT, by Toronto City Council, over Mayor Rob Ford's objections. This was announced by Metrolinx four months later, with the support of Ontario Premier Dalton McGuinty. Construction of the 19-kilometre (12 mi) line began in 2011 and was completed in 2026. A western extension of the line, which will follow phase 2 of the Eglinton West line, began construction in 2022.

== Proposed stations ==
The cancelled Eglinton West subway would only have been built as far as York Centre station. Eglinton West–Allen, Keele North and York Centre would have had bus connections and the remaining stations would have had on-street connections only. These stations would have served mixed commercial and residential neighbourhoods (corresponding Line 5 Eglinton stations linked in parentheses where names differ):

- Eglinton West–Allen (Cedarvale)
- Dufferin North (Fairbank)
- Caledonia
- Keele North / Trethewey (Keelesdale)
- York Centre (Mount Dennis)

The expanded line would have served a suburban residential area and included six stations between Jane Street and Martin Grove Road. Continuing west, the line would have split into two branches to serve commercial–industrial areas near the airport. One branch would have diverted to Dixon Road and terminated at Carlingview, while the other would have stayed on Eglinton Avenue to Renforth Drive. Stations on this line would likely have had bus connections available:

- Jane North
- Scarlett
- Royal York North
- Islington North
- Kipling North
- Martin Grove
- Attwell–Skyway (Dixon Road branch)
- Carlingview (Dixon Road branch)
- Renforth (Eglinton Avenue branch)

== Allen station ==
Also known as Eglinton West-Allen or Lower Eglinton West, construction of a lower platform of the existing Eglinton West station at the foot of Allen Road that would have made it an interchange station between the Yonge–University–Spadina and Eglinton West lines started in 1994 but only progressed to a partial tunnel stage that was backfilled shortly after the project's cancellation. The lower station was re-excavated for the Line 5 project and subtitled Allen Road on the platforms upon its opening, and the entire station was renamed Cedarvale on December 7, 2025, two months before Line 5 opened in 2026.

== See also ==
- Queen subway line
