= Judge Sheppard =

Judge Sheppard may refer to

- John Levi Sheppard (1852–1902), judge of the Texas Fifth Judicial District
- William Bostwick Sheppard (1860–1934), judge of the United States District Court for the Northern District of Florida

== See also ==
- Judge Shepherd (disambiguation)
- Justice Shepard (disambiguation)
