= Network 2011 =

1985 Toronto Transit Commission plan for transit expansion

Network 2011 was a plan for transit expansion created in 1985 by the Toronto Transit Commission. It was centred on three proposed subway lines: the Downtown Relief Line, Eglinton West Line, and the Sheppard Line. Only a small portion of the Sheppard Line was built, due largely to the efforts of Mel Lastman, the mayor of North York where it ran. Work on the Eglinton West line started with a short underground section, but was later cancelled and the tunnel was filled in. The Downtown Relief Line never started construction.

Decades later, with little additional capacity having been added, the congestion problems originally identified by Network 2011 were now far worse. This led to the original plans being revisited, and work on the cancelled sections was revived. The Eglinton subway route was replaced by a light rail route known as the Eglinton Crosstown in an effort to save construction costs, and the Relief Line became the Ontario Line. On February 8, 2026, the Eglinton Crosstown opened to the public after years of delays. As of 2026, construction on the Ontario Line is underway, and is projected to open in 2031.

== The plan ==
The 1970s had seen the end of new expressway construction in Toronto, and the preservation of the downtown streetcar system. In 1972, while construction was underway on the Spadina Subway line, the provincial government of Bill Davis introduced the GO-Urban transit plan for the Toronto region. Rather than build either subways or light rail, the plan would build a network of innovative maglevs to ring Metro Toronto. The maglev project failed, and the province switched to supporting UTDC's Intermediate Capacity Transit System. An initial line was built, the Scarborough RT, but it went greatly over budget and no further lines were attempted.

Network 2011 was designed to meet the needs of a rapidly growing city where building new expressways was politically impossible. There was also strong resistance to further intensification of the downtown core. The same spirit of activism that had stopped the Spadina Expressway and saved the streetcars also blocked residential redevelopment projects such as the plans for Trefann Court and Kensington Market. Community activists also opposed more downtown office towers, and as a result the city plan called for the creation of three suburban "subcentres" that would become central business districts independent of the core: North York City Centre, Scarborough City Centre, and Etobicoke City Centre. Improving transit to these areas was a central focus of the plan.

The GO-Urban and ICTS experiments being failures, the TTC was unwilling to again risk anything experimental, and the plan called for future transit expansion to use subways of the same design as the existing lines. The plan did not consider using the CLRV and ALRV streetcars which were being delivered at the time to run on the downtown tracks.

Under the lead of planner Jiri Pill, the TTC delivered a plan to Metro Toronto in May 1985 calling for a near doubling of Toronto's rapid transit lines. The Network 2011 plan had five elements to be built over the next 28 years and would cost an estimated $2.7 billion:

- Sheppard subway line from Yonge Street to Victoria Park Avenue, the top priority with work hoped to begin almost immediately. Estimated cost of $500 million
- Downtown Relief Line running from Union Station to Donlands station to relieve pressure on the Bloor–Yonge station. Estimated to cost $565 million and open in 1998.
- Temporary busway on Eglinton West to be completed by 2003 and would cost $365 million
- Sheppard Phase 2, extension of the Sheppard Line east from Victoria Park Avenue to Scarborough Town Centre and west to Dufferin Street. Opening in 2009 at an estimated cost of $740 million
- Replacement of the Eglinton busway with either light rail or a full subway. Construction to begin in 2011 and cost of $425 million.
- Also attached to the plan, but not an official part, were the Harbourfront and Spadina LRT lines that were already underway when the plan was announced.

== Debates ==
The plan was well received by most in Toronto, and was approved by Metro Council in June 1986. Most of the debate was over which sections should be built first. The mayors of York and Etobicoke wanted the Eglinton Line moved up in priority, while North York and Scarborough pushed for the Sheppard Line to be built first, and for the entire line to be built at once rather than in two sections. The Eglinton line had been discussed since 1975, and the need for a Downtown Relief Line has also previously been discussed. The call for a subway along suburban Sheppard was unexpected. Sheppard was prioritized because the bus lines were overloaded, and putting it first could win support from suburban councillors who were less enthused to invest in transit. The creation of the Sheppard Line would add enough passengers onto the Yonge Line to overload Yonge-Bloor Station, requiring the Downtown Relief Line to be the next built. This angered councillors from York and Etobicoke, who wanted the Eglinton Line to have higher priority. The governments of Mississauga and Peel also wanted the Eglinton Line built sooner, and put pressure on the province, who was paying 75% of the cost, to have its schedule advanced.

One critic of the plan was Steve Munro, of Streetcars for Toronto, the group that had saved the Toronto streetcar system in the 1970s. He argued that the TTC planners were too focused on subways, and this made the programme too expensive and less likely to be built. He argued that options such as underground LRT were not considered by the TTC, and would have met requirements with a lower price. The opposition to the plan was led by the Better Transportation Coalition, under the leadership of Gord Perks. Perks argued that a streetcar in a separate right-of-way along Sheppard would easily address the needed ridership, at a fraction of the cost.

There were also concerns over the Downtown Relief Line. Munro noted that a line running from Danforth to downtown would serve mostly as a transfer for passengers coming from further east and would have little benefit to the local community, and should instead extend further north, additionally serving Don Mills. Local councillor Dale Martin agreed that the line mainly served the interests of developers looking for intensification rather than local residents. Jack Layton emerged as the leader of the councillors opposed to the DRL, concerned it would lead to further intensification downtown. Layton and his allies were strong followers of Jane Jacobs, and believed in preserving downtown neighbourhoods as they were and redirecting office developments to the suburbs. The new developments in the suburbs would allow true urban communities to develop there, and create a multi-directional traffic that would make far better use of existing downtown infrastructure.

== Provincial revisions and cancellations ==
The complaints from Peel region were also matched by demands from York Region that the province fund Highway 407. The provincial government of David Peterson delayed approving the Network 2011 projects until a study analyzing transit needs across the entire Greater Toronto Area was completed. In April 1990 the Peterson government announced their "Let's Move" program of $6.2 billion in transportation spending across the GTA over the next ten years. Let's Move added several components to the Network 2011 plan: a northern connection along Finch between the Yonge and Spadina Lines, extension of the Bloor Subway to Sherway Gardens, SRT extension to Sheppard, building an LRT along Eglinton into Mississauga. Missing from the plan was the Downtown Relief Line. It also deprioritized Sheppard, offering to fund it only if the private sector contributed a significant amount.

Peterson's Liberals lost the 1990 provincial election to the New Democrats under Bob Rae. In 1993 the Rae government released its own transit plan, the Rapid Transit Expansion Program. It retained the Sheppard Line, but only to Don Mills; upgraded Eglinton to a full subway, but only to York City Centre; kept the Scarborough RT extension from the Let's Move proposal, and added an extension of the Spadina Line to York University.

The Eglinton and Sheppard Lines were the initial priorities, and work began almost immediately. In 1995 the Progressive Conservatives under Mike Harris were elected, and they immediately launched a program of sharp cost cutting. Despite already being under construction the Eglinton Line was cancelled. Sheppard did go ahead, but any plans to go further east than Don Mills were shelved. The new Sheppard Line opened in 2002 at a cost of about $1 billion.

As of 2010, the only parts of the Network 2011 plan completed are the Sheppard line between Yonge and Don Mills, and the Spadina line extension to Downsview station. In 2007, mayor David Miller unveiled the Transit City expansion plan, which proposed light rail lines along two of the Network 2011 corridors, Eglinton and Sheppard East. This plan was accepted, and partially funded by the provincial government's "Big Move" transit plan. In the 2010 municipal election, Rob Ford was elected mayor. He announced the cancellation of Transit City on the day that he took office. In 2017, the Spadina line was realized by the opening of the Toronto–York Spadina Subway Extension (TYSSE), which did not loop back at Steeles Avenue back towards Finch station and headed further north into York Region.

== See also ==
- MoveOntario 2020
- Transit City
