= Sheepherder (disambiguation) =

Sheepherder is a person who herds sheep.

Sheepherder or sheepherders may also refer to:

- Sheepherder (painting), a 1980 work by Chen Danqing
- The Sheepherders, a New Zealand wrestling tag team

== See also ==
- Shepherd (disambiguation)
- Shepherding (disambiguation)
