= Judge Shepherd =

Judge Shepherd may refer to:

- Bobby Shepherd (born 1951), judge of the United States Court of Appeals for the Eighth Circuit
- Samuel Shepherd (1760–1840), Lord Chief Baron of the Scottish Court of Exchequer

== See also ==
- Judge Sheppard (disambiguation)
- Justice Shepard (disambiguation)
