= Shepard, Missouri =

- Former community
- Location within Missouri Location within the United States
- Coordinates: 37.696436°N 90.887073°W
- Country: United States
- State: Missouri
- County: Iron
- Elevation: 1,191 ft (363 m)
- Time zone: UTC-6 (Central (CST))
  - Summer (DST): UTC-5 (CDT)
- GNIS feature ID: 739932

Shepard is an extinct town in Iron County, in the U.S. state of Missouri.

A post office called Shepard was established in 1913, and remained in operation until 1929. The community has the name of Elihu H. Shepard, an early settler.
