= Transit City =

Proposed Toronto public transit plan

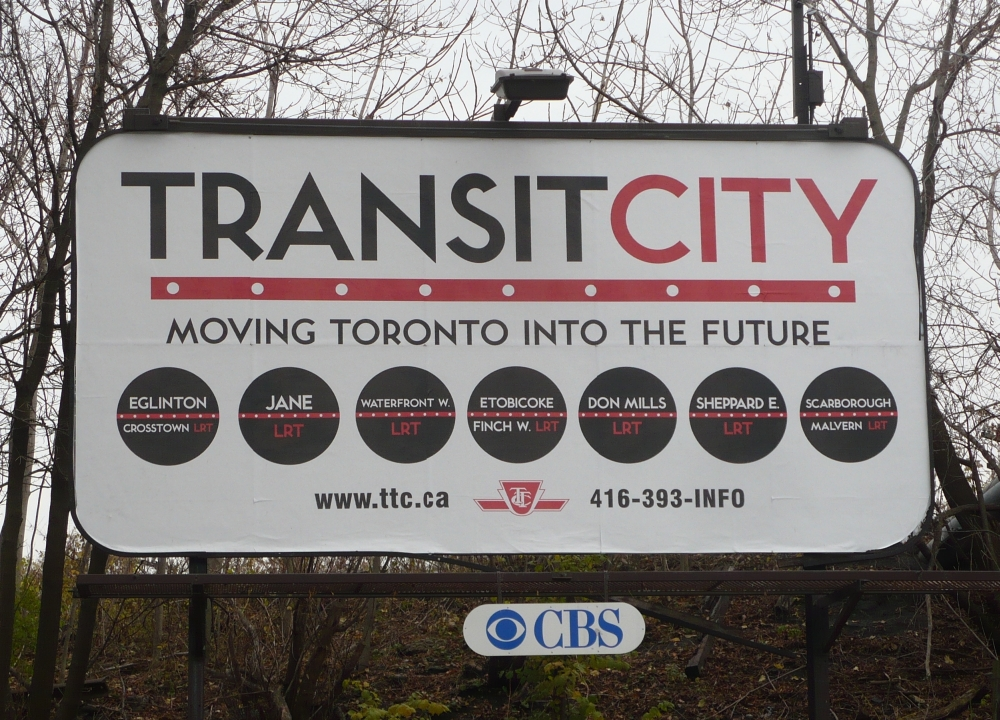
Promotional billboard indicating the original seven proposed LRT lines

Transit City was a plan for developing public transport in Toronto, Ontario, Canada. It was first proposed and announced on 16 March 2007 by Toronto mayor David Miller and Toronto Transit Commission (TTC) chair Adam Giambrone. The plan called for the construction of seven new light rail lines along the streets of seven priority transit corridors, which would have eventually been integrated with existing rapid transit, streetcar, and bus routes. Other transit improvements outlined in the plan included upgrading and extending the Scarborough RT line (later Line 3 Scarborough), implementing new bus rapid transit lines, and improving frequency and timing of 21 key bus routes. The plan integrated public transportation objectives outlined in the City of Toronto Official Plan, the TTC Ridership Growth Strategy and Miller's 2006 election platform.

By 2009, preliminary engineering work and environmental impact assessments had been done for the construction of the light rail lines. Construction of one of the lines began in December 2009.

On 1 December 2010, Rob Ford took office as the city's new mayor based on an election promise to expand the subway system, instead of implementing light rail lines. As a result, he cancelled the Transit City initiative. However, in early 2012, Toronto City Council voted in favour of motions to resume work on the Sheppard East LRT, the Eglinton Crosstown LRT and the Etobicoke–Finch West LRT projects and to replace the Scarborough RT, defeating Rob Ford's campaign for subways. The master agreement for these lines was signed on 28 November 2012. While these projects were originally proposed under Transit City, they became part of Metrolinx's implementation of The Big Move regional transportation plan.

In 2016, the City of Toronto directed its staff to resurrect and update the 2009 Transit City plan for the Scarborough Malvern LRT, renaming the project as the Eglinton East LRT. Until 2021, the city considered making the EELRT an eastward extension of Line 5 Eglinton, but by 2022, it decided that the Eglinton East LRT should be a standalone line. By 2018, the province had decided to abandon the Sheppard East LRT, instead proposing to extend Line 4 Sheppard to McCowan Road in Scarborough, after which the city decided to incorporate the eastern portion of the Sheppard East LRT into its proposal for the Eglinton East LRT.

Two light rail lines originally proposed as part of Transit City are complete: the Eglinton Crosstown LRT (now Line 5 Eglinton) opened in February 2026 and the Etobicoke–Finch West LRT (now Line 6 Finch West) opened in December 2025.

== Projects ==
Map of proposed light rail and bus rapid transit lines

A map of the proposed light rail transit (LRT) and bus rapid transit (BRT) lines according to Transit City. The "existing subway / RT" lines include the proposed northern extension of the Yonge–University–Spadina line and the proposed eastern extension of the Scarborough RT. Future stations to be built, both subway and LRT, are in italics. Proposed LRT stops on each LRT line are not shown. Note that the Scarborough RT is shown as an existing subway / RT line, although its revitalization plan was part of Transit City.

The plan proposed 120 km (74.6 mi) of tram or electric light rail along seven routes. The proposed network would carry 175 million riders a year, of which 75 million would be new Toronto Transit Commission (TTC) users. The seven proposed corridors were divided into two project priority phases: current and planned. In May 2009, Metrolinx CEO Robert Prichard announced that after further study, the proposed project was being scaled down, with shortened routes or deferrals to fit within the dedicated provincial funding for Transit City, not factoring in the province's March 2010 announcement that it was deferring $4 billion in funding.

The TTC was prepared to fund the entire cost of the network over a longer period of time. The highest priority was assigned to the Sheppard East, Eglinton Crosstown and Etobicoke–Finch West LRT lines, and to the revitalization of the Scarborough RT line (Line 3 Scarborough), which was projected to be built by 2020. In addition to the mentioned lines, it was likely that some sort of link would be established between the two lines, so that they could share a single storage facility. The TTC completed the environmental impact assessments for most of these lines, the first one being completed for the Sheppard East line. The construction of this line commenced in December 2009 but was stopped a year later by newly elected mayor Rob Ford.

=== Light rail transit ===
As of 2025, there were several former Transit City proposals under construction or in the proposal stage.

The following two light-rail lines are complete. Both lines originated from the Transit City proposal but with some modifications. These are Metrolinx projects.

- Line 5 Eglinton (formerly the Eglinton Crosstown LRT): The longest of the proposed corridors, this line would eventually extend over 33 km (20.5 mi) along Eglinton Avenue, from Kennedy subway station to Toronto Pearson International Airport. The road between Keele Street and Laird Drive was deemed too narrow for a right-of-way, so the line would run in a tunnel (with underground stations), much like the cancelled Eglinton West subway line. The entire planned route was originally expected to be completed by 2020. The western section between Mount Dennis and Pearson International Airport was postponed as a result of provincial funding cuts. It is the only LRT line that survived Rob Ford's cuts, albeit modified to include an extended underground section in the east and the removal of the western section. The eastern underground extension was revised back to a surface alignment in the 2012 transit vote. In February 2026, the 19-kilometre-long (12 mi) central and eastern sections opened to the public. As a separate project, a westward extension between Mount Dennis and Renforth station was under construction, but contrary to the 2009 Transit City proposal, it will be completely off-street using tunnels and elevated structures. The western section from Renforth station to Pearson International Airport has been deferred as a later project which would involve planning by both Metrolinx and the Greater Toronto Airports Authority.
- Line 6 Finch West (formerly the Etobicoke–Finch West LRT): This line runs along Finch Avenue West, from Humber College North Campus to Finch West subway station on Line 1 Yonge–University. The plan was to keep the line's eastern terminus at Finch subway station and later extend the line to Don Mills subway station, providing a continuous route with the Sheppard East LRT, but this plan was postponed as a result of provincial funding cuts and subsequently abandoned. Construction for its current route was expected to be completed by 2019. The line opened in 2025.

The following projects, originating from Transit City, were being pursued by the City of Toronto rather than Metrolinx. They are in the proposal stage.

- Waterfront West LRT: A line along the western waterfront, running along Lake Shore Boulevard West from Long Branch GO Station eastward to the Exhibition Grounds, where it would continue eastwards along Fort York Boulevard and Bremner Street toward Union station. Unlike other Transit City projects, the Waterfront West LRT was an expansion of the Toronto streetcar system. This route was proposed since it passes densely built upcoming neighbourhoods and trip generators such as the Rogers Centre and the CN Tower. In January 2013, the project was cancelled by Toronto city officials. In 2015, a report titled Waterfront Transit Reset recommended a "reset" for this decision, due to a lack of a comprehensive plan for a transit network to respond to the rapid changes occurring around the waterfront. In 2017, a report about the Waterfront Transit Reset was presented to the TTC board. It included a number of recommendations to improve streetcar service along the lakeshore between Long Branch and Leslie Street. Should these recommendations regarding streetcar service between Long Branch and Union station be implemented, the resulting route would be similar to the Waterfront West LRT.
- Scarborough Malvern LRT: The line originally would have run from Kennedy Station to the Morningside/Sheppard intersection near the Malvern neighbourhood via Eglinton Avenue East, Kingston Road and Morningside Avenue. The line would pass near the University of Toronto Scarborough (UTSC); it was believed that this line would commence operation much sooner since UTSC was a venue for the 2015 Pan American Games. In 2016, the Scarborough Malvern LRT was dubbed "Crosstown East" and later "Eglinton East LRT" as the eastern extension for the Eglinton Crosstown line. By 2023, the Eglinton East LRT became a standalone line, separate from Line 5 Eglinton. Unlike in the Transit City proposal, the Eglinton East LRT would serve Sheppard Avenue between Morningside Avenue and McCowan Road as well as Malvern Town Centre.

The following Transit City projects were inactive or cancelled:

- Sheppard East LRT: This line would have run along Sheppard Avenue East from Don Mills Station via the future Sheppard East RT station on the Scarborough RT line, ending at a planned storage facility at Conlins Road, just east of Morningside Avenue. The line was to be constructed approximately 5 km further east to Meadowvale Road, but that portion was postponed as a result of the provincial funding cuts. Construction for the line began in December 2009, with official groundbreaking by Toronto Mayor David Miller. The line would have served the Sheppard East Village, a commercial neighbourhood along Sheppard Avenue East. An extension of the line northwards to the Toronto Zoo was being considered. With construction having started in 2009, the line was expected to be completed and opened in 2014, the first of the seven lines. In June 2012, the province of Ontario announced that construction of the Sheppard East LRT would not resume until 2017 or finish until 2021. By 2017, planning for the line was shelved indefinitely. By 2018, the province decided to propose extending Line 4 Sheppard to McCowan Road in Scarborough.
- Jane LRT: A line running along Jane Street, from Pioneer Village station on the Yonge–University–Spadina subway line (Line 1 Yonge–University) east of the intersection of Jane Street and Steeles Avenue, connecting with the Bloor–Danforth subway (Line 2 Bloor–Danforth) presumably at Jane station. This line was cancelled.
- Don Mills LRT: A line running along Don Mills Road from Steeles Avenue, then through Don Mills station, then through East York Centre (Overlea Boulevard), where it would then follow the Leaside Bridge to Pape Avenue, and travel into a tunnel under Pape for about 2 km to Danforth (presumably at Pape station). As of 2019, the part of the line south of Eglinton Avenue is planned to be part of the Ontario Line.

==== Scarborough RT ====
Part of the Transit City project was the revitalization and extension of the Scarborough RT (later Line 3 Scarborough). In 2010, the TTC and the City of Toronto completed an environmental assessment to convert the line to light rail and extend it to Malvern from its eastern terminus, McCowan station, with potential new stations at Bellamy Road, Centennial College's Progress Campus and Sheppard Avenue, with a possible additional station at Brimley Road between the existing Midland and Scarborough Centre stations.

In 2007, the service's existing ICTS (intermediate capacity transit system) fleet was approaching the end of its operational lifespan; as trains were no longer built to that line's specification, a replacement was needed. A multi-year shutdown to modify the line's infrastructure would have been required regardless of whether light rail or an upgraded form of ICTS (Mark II Vehicles designed by Bombardier) was used. Thus, it was decided to implement light rail similar to other Transit City light-rail lines.

During his 2010 mayoralty campaign, Rob Ford denounced the idea of light rail transit and instead proposed replacing the Scarborough RT with an extension of Line 2 Bloor–Danforth. In 2011, the province persuaded Rob Ford to have the Scarborough RT replaced with an extension of the Eglinton Crosstown LRT so that the latter would run from Mount Dennis to Scarborough City Centre.

In June 2013, Toronto City Council decided to replace the Scarborough RT with an extension of Line 2 Bloor–Danforth north to Sheppard Avenue rather than light rail.

In April 2019, Premier Doug Ford announced that the province would finance and build a three-stop extension of the Line 2 to replace the Scarborough RT.

=== Bus rapid transit ===
Transit City also called for six new bus rapid transit (BRT) right-of-way lines to be built once light rail transit construction had been completed. Originally to be TTC projects, one has been built, two proposed lines were taken over by Metrolinx, and the others have been abandoned. The proposed routes were:

- The York University Busway began service in 2009 to connect Downsview station to York University until the opening of the Toronto–York Spadina Subway Extension. As of 2023, the 939B Finch Express service uses the busway from Finch West station to Dufferin Street and then runs in mixed traffic on Finch Avenue to Finch station.
- Kingston Road–Danforth BRT was to run along Danforth Avenue and Kingston Road, from Victoria Park station to the intersection of Kingston Road and Eglinton Avenue, where a station would have been built to connect to the proposed Scarborough Malvern LRT. This BRT was never implemented.
- Yonge North BRT was to run from Finch station to Richmond Hill. This project was abandoned because of plans for the Yonge North Subway Extension.
- Wilson BRT was to run along Wilson Avenue, from Wilson station to Keele Street. This plan was never implemented.
- Durham–Scarborough BRT would run along Ellesmere Road from Scarborough Centre station into the Durham Region. As of 2023, this is an active Metrolinx proposal that, if and when completed, would run as far east as Oshawa.
- Dundas BRT would run along Dundas Street from Kipling station into Mississauga. As of 2023, this is an active Metrolinx proposal.

== Funding and costs ==
In April 2009, the Finch West, Eglinton Crosstown, and the Scarborough RT upgrade and extension projects secured $7.2 billion in funding from the province, while the Sheppard East LRT received $613 million in funding from the province and $317 million in federal funding. In November 2007, the TTC provided an updated estimate of the costs of the proposal in its capital budget. The project cost to be paid by the Government of Ontario was $8.3 billion.

On 15 June 2007, the Government of Ontario announced its MoveOntario 2020 plan, which called for a major overhaul and expansion of the Greater Toronto Area's transit systems, including the Transit City proposal, that was expected to cost an estimated $17.5 billion in provincial and federal funding over a 12-year period. The provincial government proposed providing two-thirds of the funds ($11.5 billion) and asked the federal government to pay the remaining one-third ($6 billion). However, Prime Minister Stephen Harper's government did not commit to this spending plan. The province's $17.5 billion MoveOntario 2020 plan called for a total number of 52 transit projects in the GTA to be funded, with 95% of the projects to be completed by the year 2020.

On 18 June 2009, Toronto mayor David Miller requested federal funding from the Harper government's $12-billion stimulus spending to purchase new streetcars as part of the Transit City plan. The city faced a deadline of 27 June 2009 to commit to the $1.2-billion deal signed with Bombardier for the 204 streetcars. Miller and Ontario premier Dalton McGuinty flew to Thunder Bay to announce their funding for the new streetcars, hoping to convince the Harper government to come up with its one-third share of the cost. Federal Transport Minister John Baird rejected the request outright. Baird stated that streetcar funding clearly failed to meet the stimulus bill's requirement that the funds would have to be spent in 2 years, as it was meant to put money into the economy quickly to buoy demand and stave off deflation, while Transit City was a long-term project. The stimulus also required funds to be spent on infrastructure in the municipality where the application was granted in order to create local employment, whereas the jobs created by building streetcars would be in Thunder Bay and not Toronto. Baird noted that Toronto was the only one of 2,700 applicants that did not meet the eligibility criteria.

On 25 March 2010, the Ontario provincial government announced their decision to postpone $4 billion of funding to Metrolinx for the MoveOntario 2020 project, which included funding for Transit City. Miller had expressed discontent and condemned McGuinty, who had earlier promised to provide full funding for Transit City in order for it to be built before the 2015 Pan American Games in Toronto. The initial investment was projected to create approximately 100,000 jobs. The stated reason for the decision was a $21.3 billion deficit in the 2010 provincial operating budget. Standard economic metrics, however, show that as stimulus, Transit City would have added significantly to provincial tax revenues, and, given the province's 50-year amortization, the plan overall would have reduced Ontario's annual budget deficit. The funding deferral caused widespread debate, protests and criticism of Premier McGuinty by politicians and local groups. As a result of the postponement, the Transit City plan was scaled down and expected completion dates were pushed farther back.

The delay in funding, according to Miller, meant that the priority LRT lines (Scarborough RT, Etobicoke–Finch West and Eglinton Crosstown) would not be able to meet their planned construction and opening dates, whereas work on the Sheppard East line was to proceed as its construction had already begun. Despite the controversy over the funding, Metrolinx negotiated a deal with Bombardier Transportation for a new fleet of light rail vehicles which were to be used on future Transit City lines.

After the announcement, the City of Toronto and community groups began a lobbying campaign to restore funding, similar to the campaign leading to the initial funding. Mayor Miller condemned the funding delay and requested riders contact their members of Provincial Parliament to have the government restore the funding. Other Transit City advocates petitioned and organized rallies to promote the immediate construction of the projects.

The Public Transit Coalition was launched by transit riders to counter the delay in Transit City funding. On 21 April 2010, the group held an event at the Toronto City Hall Council Chambers.

== Economic effect ==
Had the project been implemented as originally proposed, Transit City had been expected to create approximately 200,000 new jobs in Ontario from $8.3 billion invested. This included operation, construction, and economic stimulus effect of spending. Unemployment reached 9% in 2010, the GTA's highest level since 1995.

The Ontario government's promised funding for Transit City was projected to have created short-term economic growth of $12.4 billion per year, adding in the near-term 2.1% to Ontario's GDP, according to the American Public Transportation Association.

According to the Federation of Canadian Municipalities research, Transit City was to have produced a first-year GDP gain of $17.3 billion, were all the money to be spent in the first year. After five years, the project would have added $8.0 billion per year to GDP, with each $1 billion spent on transit adding 0.06% to Canada's GDP annually. This compared closely to US Congressional testimony, which showed infrastructure investment to stimulate annual GDP at a multiplier of 1.69 within one year, or $14 billion per year for Transit City. Both studies counted direct impact of spending only.

In addition to this direct consequence, long-term indirect effects on business costs, productivity, and consumer spending from reduced congestion and travel costs were projected to have added an additional $14.1 billion of value annually to Ontario's economy. Other indirect effects not measured were improved air quality and public health and reduced carbon emissions from extending rapid transit to 1.1 million more people.

Ontario taxes capture 12% of Ontario's GDP, meaning that Transit City's stimulus effect would have directly added to provincial tax revenue. Transit City's projected direct economic impact of $12.4 billion per year would have netted the Ontario treasury $1.4 billion in annual tax revenue. Its indirect effects on congestion and transportation costs would have produced an additional $1.7 billion per year in tax revenue. In 2010, Government of Canada bonds offered 4% interest for a 10-year term. Transit City's $8.3 billion expansion funding, if amortized over 10 years at prevailing bond rates in 2010, would have cost the province $1.2 billion per year.

== See also ==
- Downtown Relief Line
- Toronto streetcar system
- Toronto subway
