= Line 4 Sheppard =

Rapid transit line in Toronto, Ontario

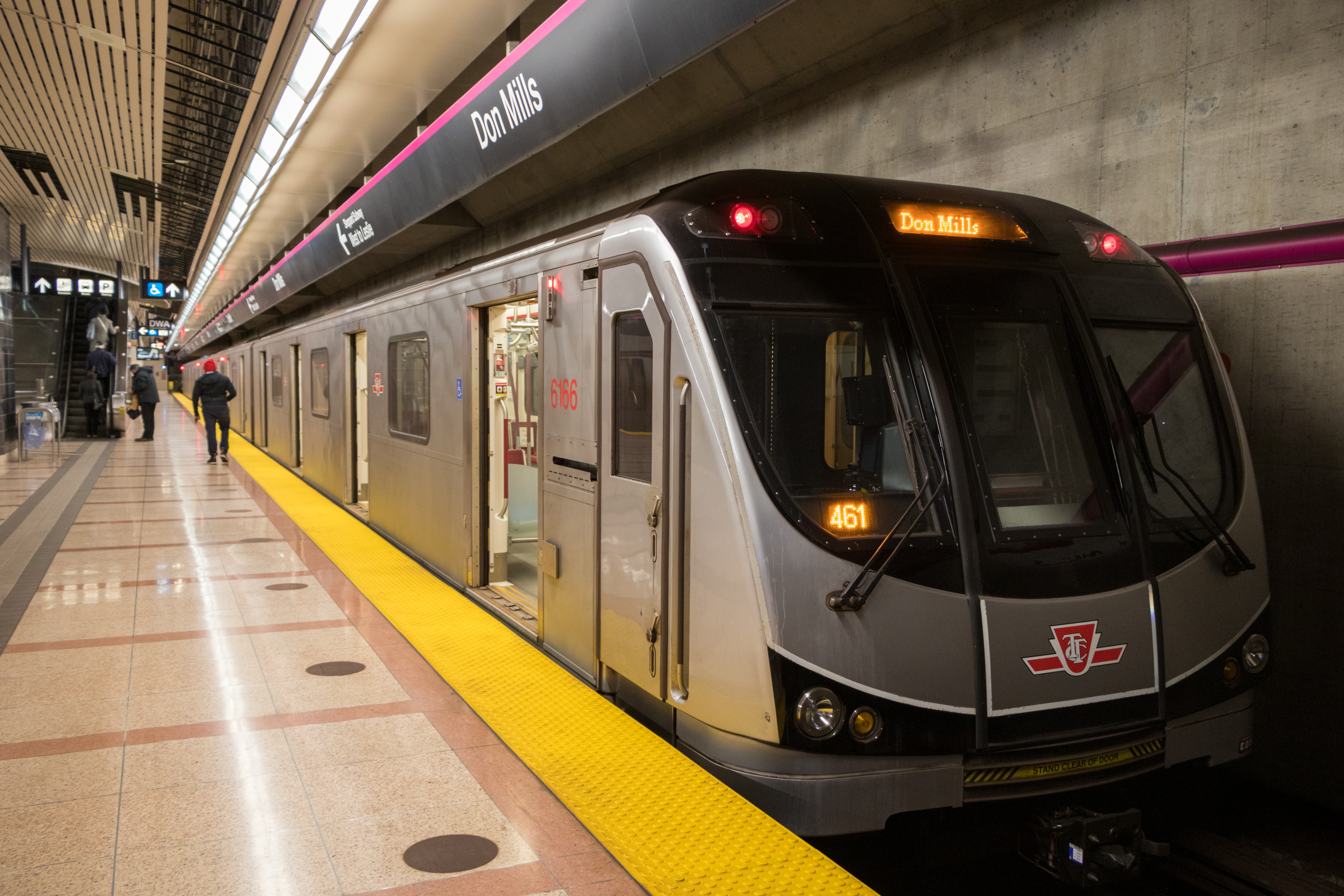
- Platform level of Don Mills station

Overview
- Status: Operational
- Owner: Toronto Transit Commission
- Locale: Toronto, Ontario
- Termini: Sheppard–Yonge; Don Mills
- Stations: 5
- Website: Official route page

Service
- Type: Rapid transit
- System: Toronto subway
- Operator: Toronto Transit Commission
- Rolling stock: Toronto Rocket
- Daily ridership: 38,705 (2023–2024 weekday avg)

History
- Opened: November 22, 2002; 23 years ago

Technical
- Line length: 5.5 km (3.4 mi)
- Track gauge: 1,495 mm (4 ft 10 7/8 in) Toronto gauge
- Electrification: Third rail, 600 V DC
- Operating speed: 50 km/h (31 mph)
- Signalling: Automatic block signaling
Route map
Line 4 Sheppard highlighted in purple

Line 4 Sheppard is a rapid transit line in the Toronto subway system, operated by the Toronto Transit Commission (TTC). Opened on November 22, 2002, the line is the shortest rapid transit line in Toronto with five stations along 5.5 kilometres (3.4 mi) of track in the district of North York along Sheppard Avenue East between Yonge Street and Don Mills Road. It is also the only line built without any open sections. All stations are wheelchair accessible and are decorated with unique public art.

In the 2000s, the Sheppard East LRT was proposed to extend rapid transit along Sheppard Avenue. Despite approvals, the project did not proceed. In 2019, the Government of Ontario announced plans to extend the subway line east to Sheppard Avenue and McCowan Road in Scarborough to meet up with an extended Line 2 Bloor–Danforth that will replace Line 3 Scarborough.

== Name ==
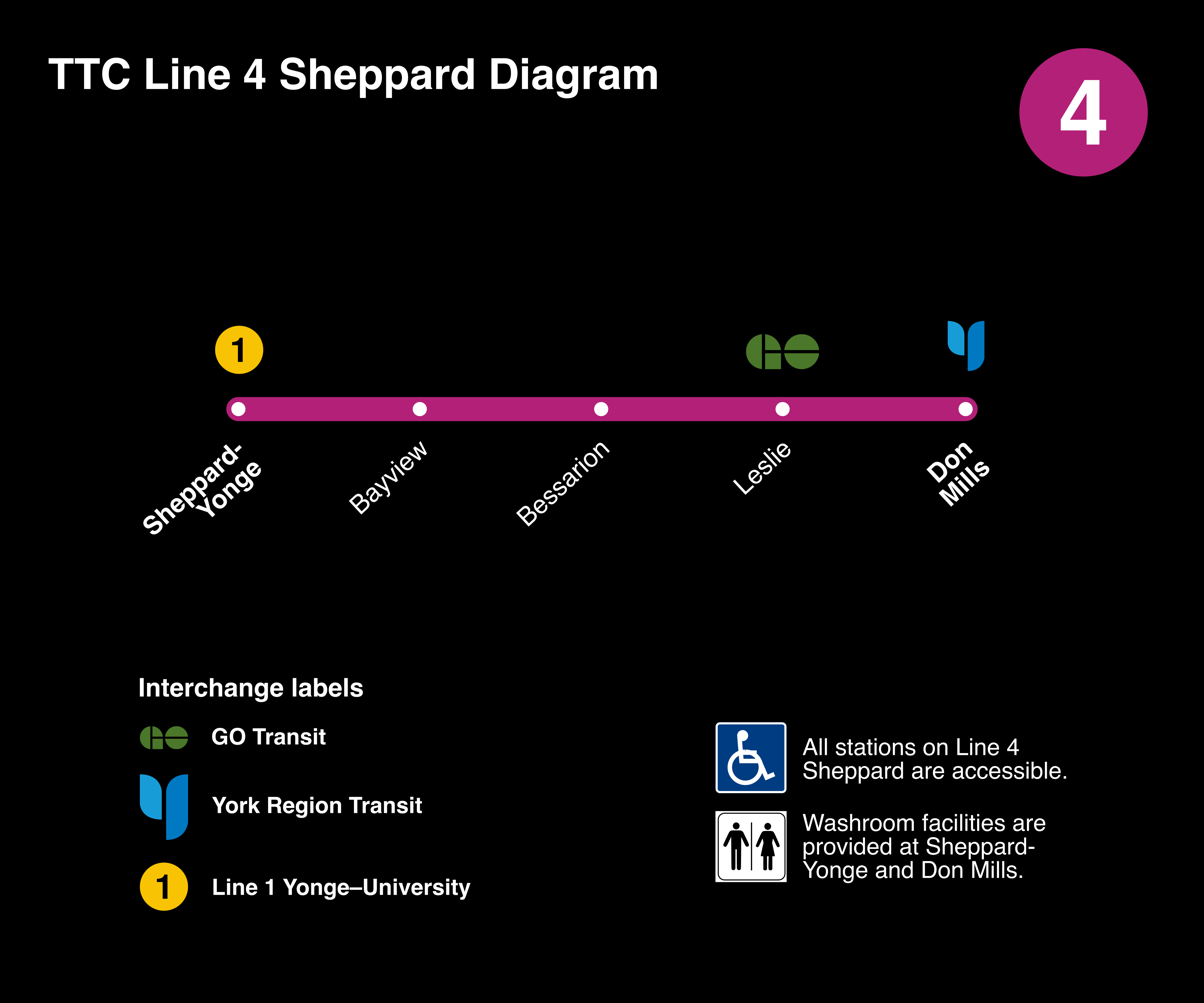
Diagram of Line 4 Sheppard

When the line opened in 2002, it was given the name "Sheppard Subway". In October 2013, the TTC announced plans to give the lines official numbers to help riders and visitors navigate the system. The Sheppard line was renamed "Line 4 Sheppard" and new signage reflecting this began being gradually implemented in March 2014. The Toronto Rocket trains also use the numerical system for interchange station announcements, such as announcing "Transfer for Line 1 Yonge–University" when the trains arrive at Sheppard–Yonge station.

== History ==
=== Origins ===
The TTC proposed the Sheppard line as part of the Network 2011 transportation plan, unveiled in 1985, which called for a line from Yonge Street to Victoria Park Avenue on the boundary between North York and Scarborough. The plan was approved by Metropolitan Toronto, but funding was delayed by the provincial government of David Peterson's Liberal Party.

In 1993, the governing New Democratic Party (NDP) under Bob Rae proposed provincial funding for four subway/LRT projects for the TTC. Included in these four proposals were plans to build new subway lines along Eglinton and Sheppard Avenues and work was begun on both projects. The NDP was defeated in the 1995 provincial election and the Progressive Conservatives under Mike Harris were elected. Shortly afterwards, Harris cancelled the Eglinton subway in York (though it would be later revived as Line 5 Eglinton, albeit as a longer light rail line with two long underground sections) but continued work on the Sheppard line.

Funding for the Sheppard line was initially rejected by city council. However, after a number of votes on different alterations to the project (including only building the subway line as far as Leslie Street), the proposal to build the Sheppard line tunnels only, without tracks, was passed by a narrow margin. After this vote passed city council, a re-vote was taken on the entire Sheppard line project to Don Mills, which then passed by a very narrow margin. James Bow, a Toronto transit reporter, documented that the political clout of North York mayor Mel Lastman (he was later elected mayor of the amalgamated City of Toronto in 1998) was crucial to the Sheppard line proposal being implemented. Councillor Joe Pantalone strongly supported the line, arguing it was a matter of civic equity and that the suburbs deserved good transit, which would – in his opinion – bring transit-oriented development to densify the suburbs. David L. Gunn, who was general manager of the TTC, opposed the Sheppard line, saying that it "made no sense to build an expensive new subway when the existing system was strapped for cash to make basic repairs" and "if the city wanted to expand transit, it would be better to do it downtown, easing congestion in the busiest parts of the system".

=== Completion and opening ===
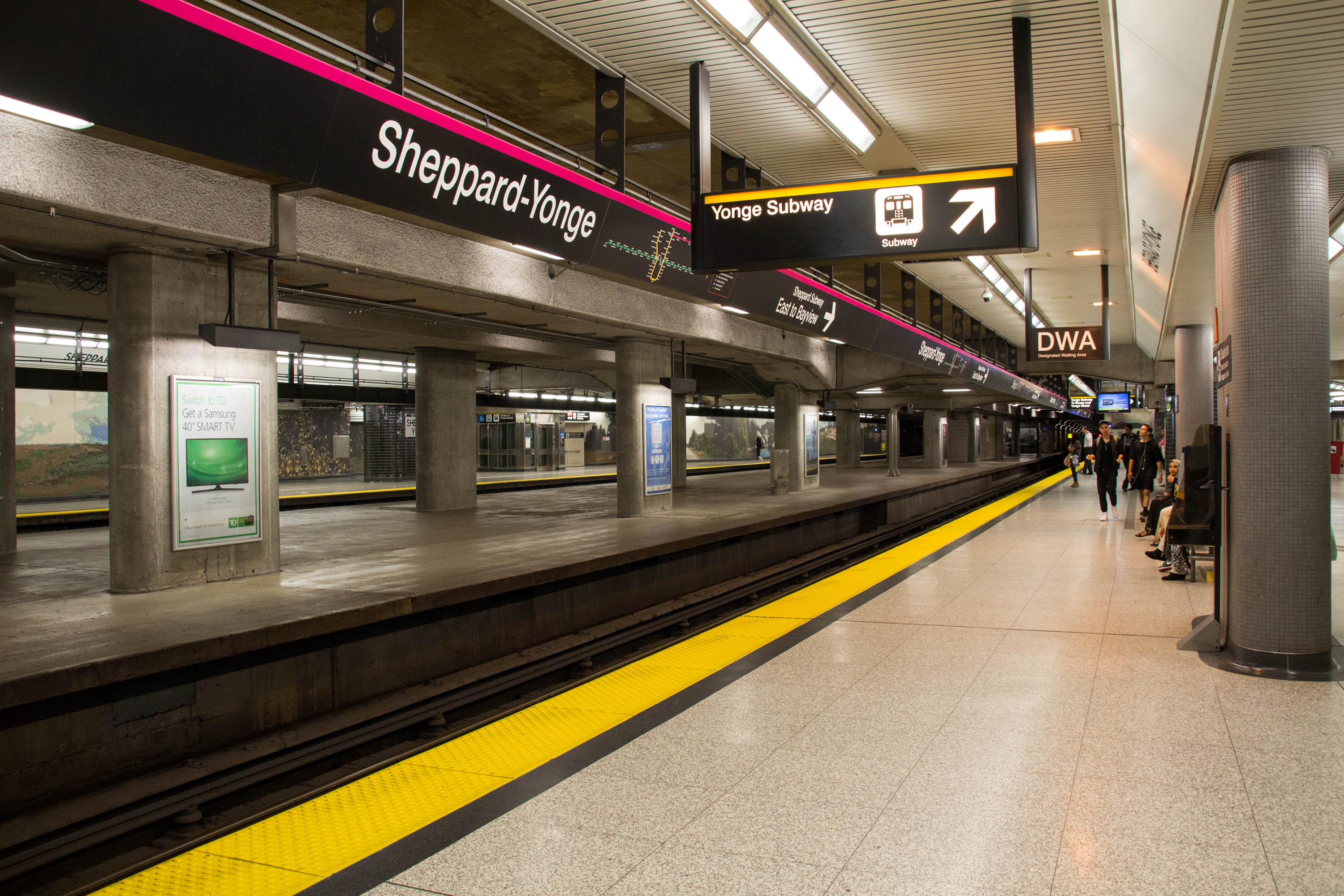
The roughed-in Spanish solution island platform in Sheppard–Yonge station

The Sheppard line was opened on November 22, 2002. It was the city's first new subway line since the opening of the Bloor–Danforth line in 1966. It remained the newest subway infrastructure in Toronto for 15 years until the opening of the Toronto–York Spadina subway extension in 2017 and the newest line until the opening of Line 6 Finch West. It is shorter than had been planned, running from Yonge Street (at the former Sheppard station, renamed Sheppard–Yonge when the Sheppard line opened) east to Don Mills Road rather than further west to Downsview station (renamed Sheppard West in May 2017 to prevent confusion with the adjacent Downsview Park station) and southeast to the former Scarborough Centre station. Downsview station had been built in 1996, ostensibly with the intention of being the western terminus of the Sheppard line before the line was truncated.

The Sheppard line cost just under CA$1 billion and took eight years to build. It is the first subway line in Canada that had plain tunnel sections built entirely by tunnel boring machine. The Sheppard line is the only subway line in Toronto that does not have any open sections. All stations on the line were constructed using the cut-and-cover method, with the expansion of Sheppard station having required an S-shaped diversion of Yonge Street during construction. Just east of Leslie station, there is an enclosed concrete bridge over the east branch of the Don River.

It was the first line to have accessible elevators at every station. The automated system to announce each station was installed in January 2006.

Its stations were built to accommodate the TTC's standard subway trains of six 23-metre (75 ft) cars, but part of each platform was blocked off since only four-car trains are needed to carry the amount of traffic on the line. The line was designed so that it can be extended at both ends, allowing for the construction of westward and eastward branches that had been planned. Likewise, the Sheppard line level of Sheppard–Yonge station was constructed with a roughed-in Spanish solution platform layout in anticipation of increased ridership, though in practice, the island platform is unused except during emergencies and only has advertising on the columns.

Platform screen doors were proposed for the Sheppard line. Installed at the edge of the platforms, platform screen doors would have aligned themselves with the subway-car doors when trains were in station for safety and suicide prevention. The proposed system was dropped because of its cost.

=== Rolling stock ===
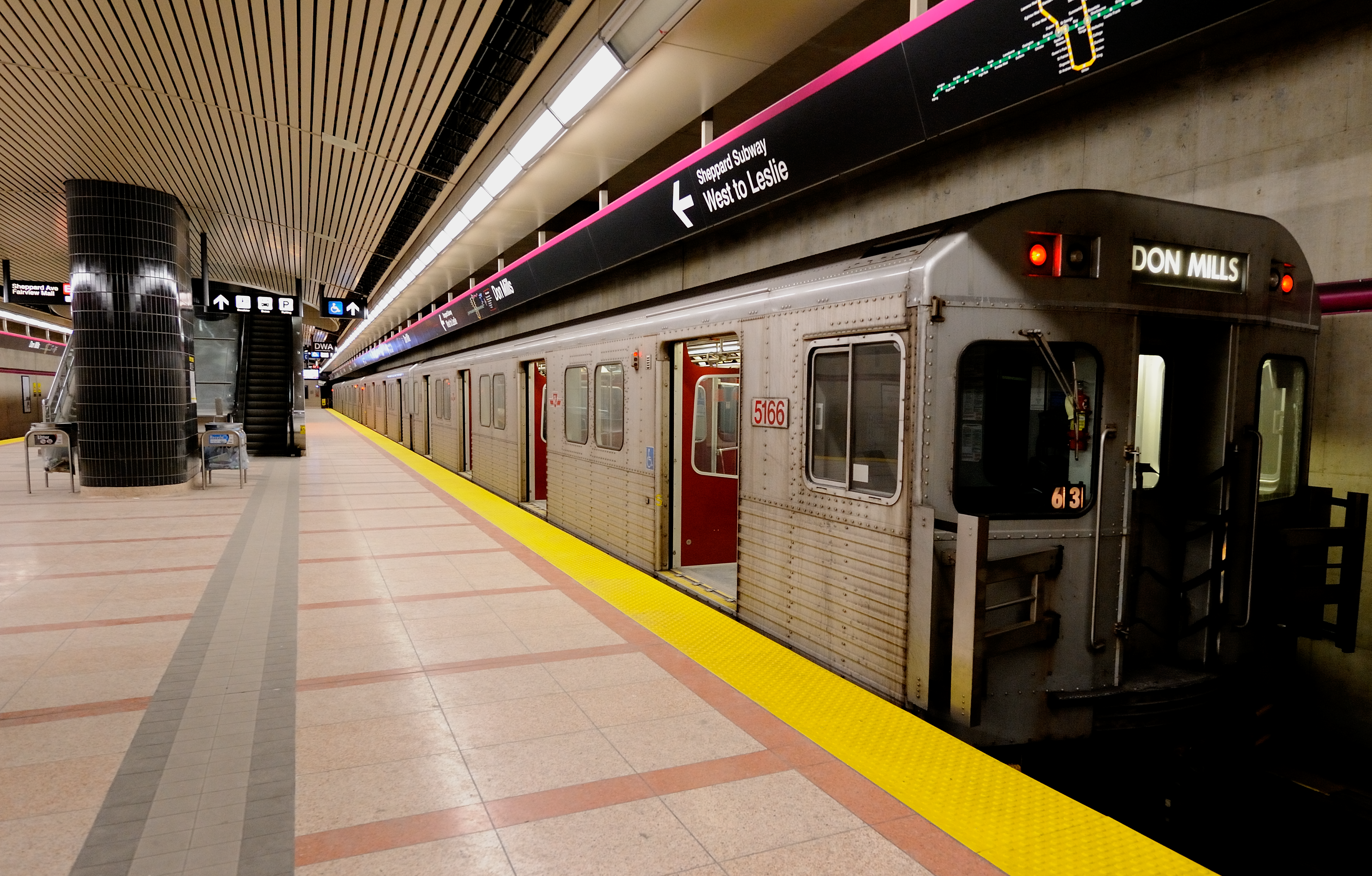
T1 train at Don Mills station

From its opening in November 2002 to May 2016, the line was operated solely with four-car T1 subway trains, with two staff members operating the trains – one driver and one guard who operated the doors. On May 30, 2016, new four-car Toronto Rocket (TR) subway trains were introduced on this line. They replaced the T1 subway trains, which had their final run on Line 4 on October 8, 2016, and were assigned to Line 2 Bloor–Danforth. The TRs are based on Bombardier Transportation's Movia-styled train sets and are the first TTC trains that have no separators between the cars. This allows passengers to walk freely from one end to the other, unlike Toronto's previous subway cars. The change to TR trains was necessary because Line 4 trains are based in Davisville Yard, which is accessed via Line 1 Yonge–University. Line 1 was converted to operate using an automatic train control system, with the conversion finishing in September 2022. From October 9, 2016, Line 4 has been served entirely by four-car TR trains, which are operated by one staff member who both drives the train and operates the doors, similar to the model that was in use on the former Line 3 Scarborough.

=== Residential development ===
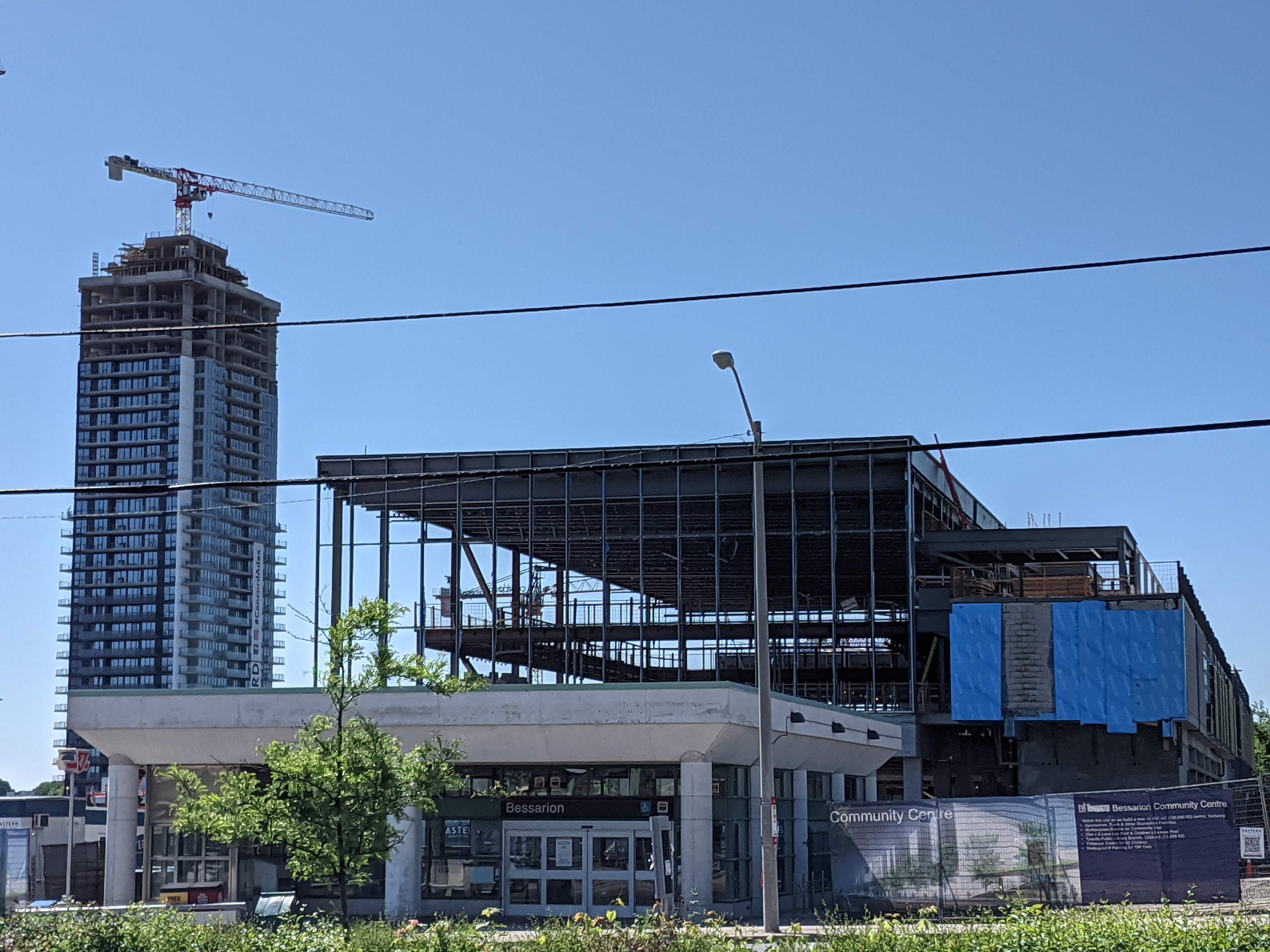
Concord Park Place transit-oriented residential development and Ethennonnhawahstihnen' Community Recreation Centre and library both under construction by Bessarion station, 2021

From its opening in 2002 to 2014, the Sheppard line spurred over CA$1 billion in new housing construction, including several high-rise condominium towers along its route as transit-oriented developments. Since 2000, condominium towers have been built around all five stations on the line, with most of the new developments being centred around Bayview and Bessarion stations. The Daniels Corporation built a six-tower condominium development, called NY Towers, north of Highway 401 between Bayview and Bessarion stations; Arc Condominiums on the northeast corner of Bayview Avenue and Sheppard Avenue; and terraced condos just east of their NY Towers. Shane Baghai built a multi-tower development in the area.

In 2007, Leslie and Bessarion stations were the least-used stations in the system. By 2015, four of twenty planned buildings of Concord Adex Investments' condominium complex, Concord Park Place, located between these two stations, had been completed. The complex is developed on the site of a former Canadian Tire warehouse and distribution centre, though Canadian Tire retains a retail location there. In July 2023, the Ethennonnhawahstihnen' Community Recreation Centre was opened to the general public adjacent to Bessarion station. At the same time, the Toronto Public Library officially opened the Ethennonnhawahstihnen' Branch within the community centre. Situated directly behind the southern entrance to Bessarion station, the new library replaced the smaller Bayview Branch, which was previously located inside the Bayview Village Shopping Centre near Bayview station. There is also development around furniture chain IKEA, McDonald's, and Oriole GO Station in the immediate area.

=== Ridership ===
From late 2002 to 2011, ridership on the Sheppard subway rose from about 10.7 million riders annually to a peak of 15.9 million. The following table shows the typical number of customer trips made on the Sheppard subway on an average weekday.

Year	2007/2008	2008/2009	2009/2010	2010/2011	2011/2012	2012/2013	2014	2015	2016	2018	2022
Ridership	45,860	45,410	47,700	49,150	50,410	49,440	47,680	49,070	47,780	50,150	39,482

Note: 2017 figures, as well as figures between 2019 and 2021, are unavailable.

== Station art ==
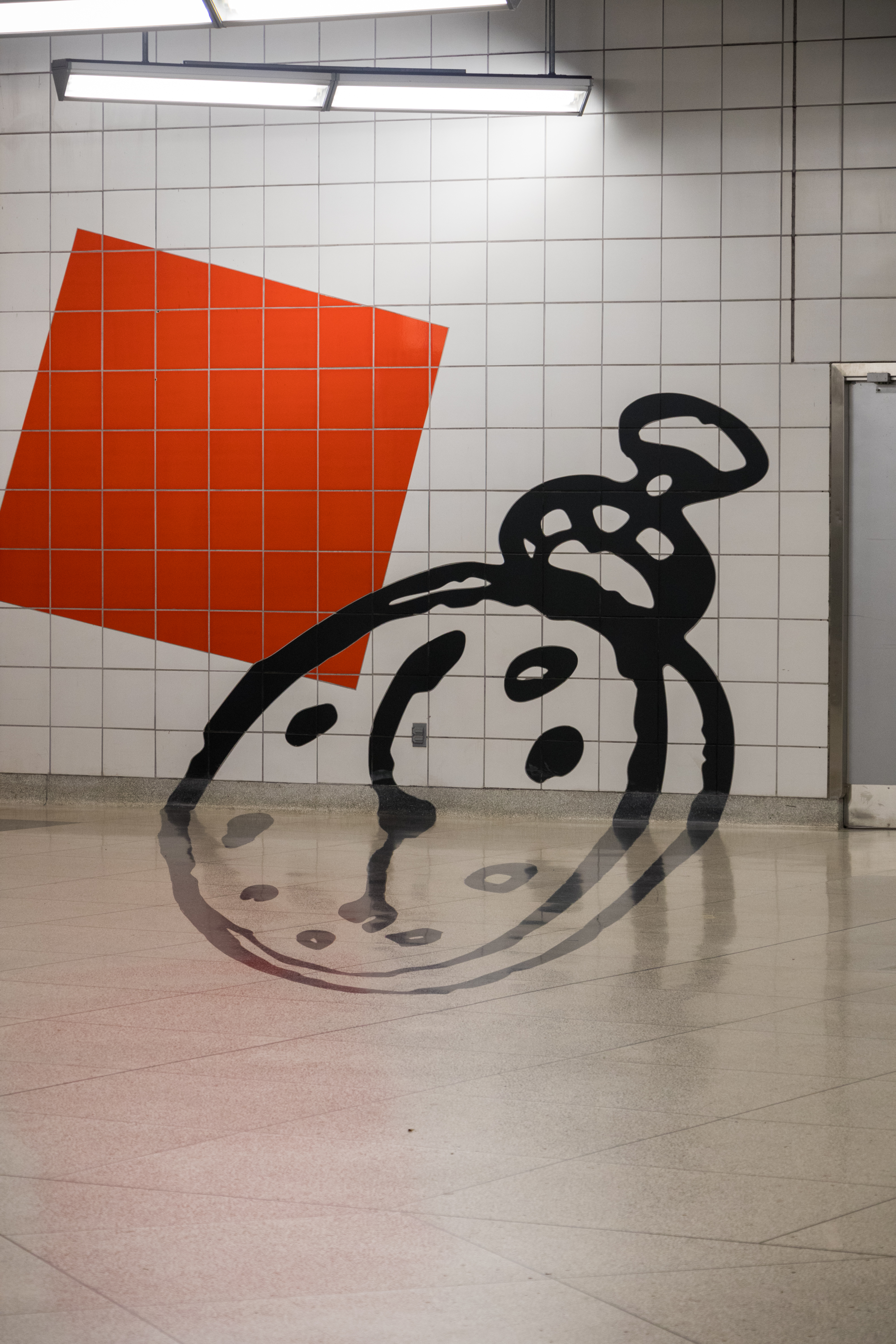
From Here Right Now, a trompe-l'œil artwork at Bayview station by Panya Clark Espinal

Line 4 features artwork in each station, such as the scenic mosaic mural at Sheppard–Yonge station, Bayview station's trompe-l'œil and Leslie station's individual wall tiles, each containing the words "Sheppard & Leslie".

== Initial criticism ==
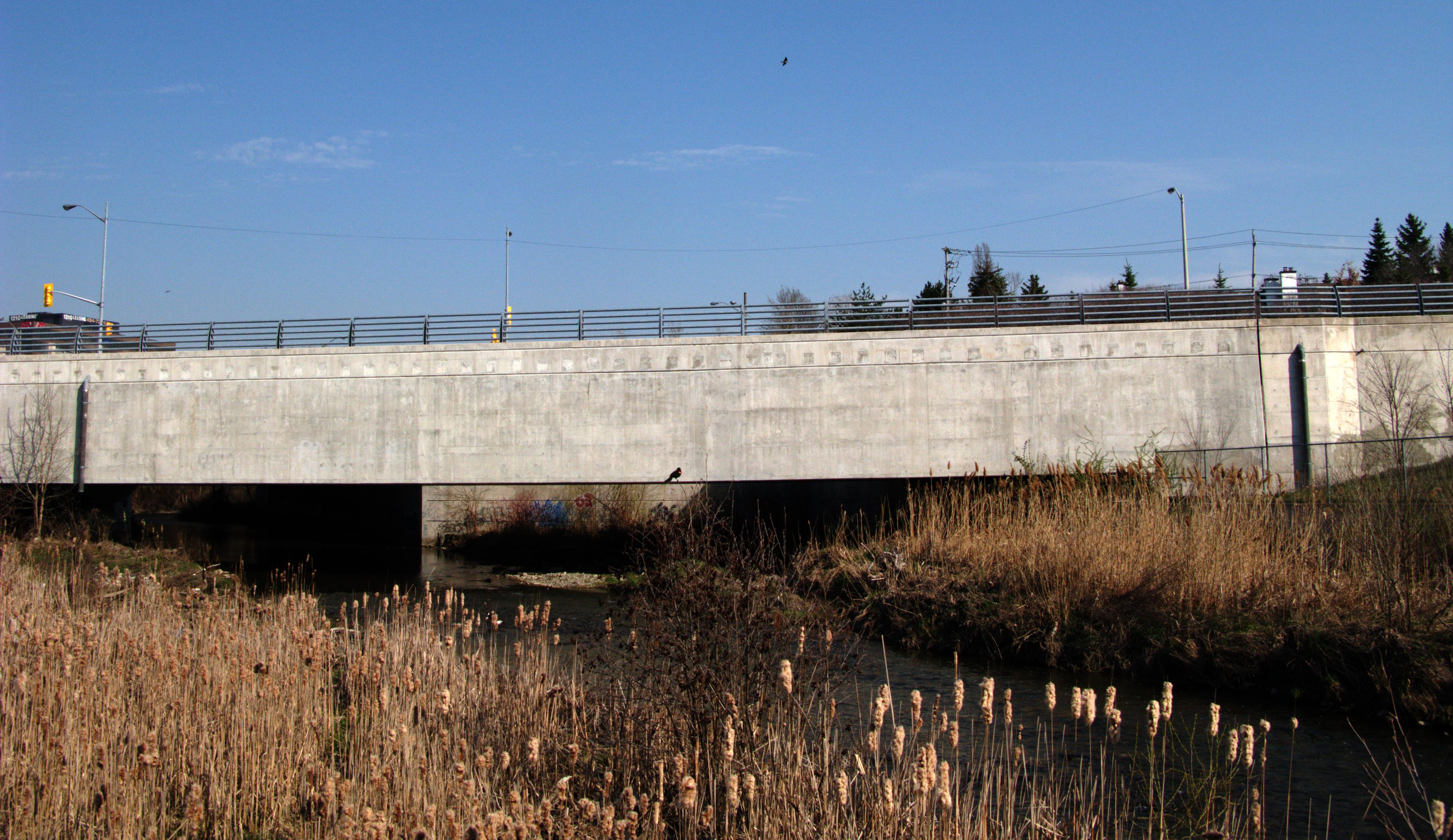
Line 4 Sheppard crossing the East Don River inside an enclosed concrete bridge just east of Leslie station

The line has been criticized as a "subway to nowhere", a "stubway", or a "white elephant". In 2018, the total ridership on the Sheppard subway line was approximately 50,000 per average weekday, similar to a few of the TTC's busiest streetcar and bus routes, though these routes are generally much longer than Sheppard's 5.5-kilometre (3.4 mi) length. The Sheppard line feeds passengers into the Yonge segment of Line 1 Yonge–University. During the City of Toronto's 2008 budget crisis, the TTC considered shutting the line down on weekends or entirely. Similarly, as a result of financial pressures brought on by the COVID-19 pandemic in Toronto, Mayor John Tory announced in 2020 that the entire line would be shut down if there were no financial support from upper levels of government, though funding was eventually secured to allow the line to remain open.

Jarrett Walker, a transportation consultant and the author of the book Human Transit, said "Sheppard's technology makes it both expensive to abandon and expensive to extend; that's the trap."

Councillor Josh Colle, who chaired the TTC from 2014 to 2018, said in May 2015 that, given the existing Sheppard subway's performance, he could rationalize spending more money to expand it east from Don Mills or west from Sheppard–Yonge, but not both. He estimated that the Sheppard subway receives a subsidy of more than $10 per ride.

According to the Metro commuter newspaper, between the opening of the Sheppard line in November 2002 and December 2014, there was over $1 billion in development along that corridor, much of it in the vicinity of Bayview, Bessarion and Don Mills stations. The area surrounding Don Mills station has a density suitable for a subway at 10,182 people per square kilometre (26,370 people/sq mi). Despite this, a majority of commuters along the Sheppard subway drive to work rather than use public transit. In 2016, according to Royson James of the Toronto Star, residents in the area commuted to jobs throughout the Greater Toronto Area by automobile rather than taking public transit. James stated that subways are designed for corridors with four to eight times the ridership along Sheppard Avenue East.

== Future expansion ==
Several informal proposals have been made to extend the line in both directions. The original proposal for the Sheppard line was for a major subway line running from Sheppard West station on the University portion of Line 1 to Scarborough Centre station on Line 3 Scarborough. Instead, funding was only approved for a truncated line with the possibility of several phased expansions.

In the 2007 Transit City plan, a Sheppard East LRT was proposed instead of an eastern subway extension. Despite various approvals, the construction of the line did not proceed as the construction of the Eglinton Crosstown LRT and the Finch West LRT were deemed a priority.

In 2019, the provincial government under Premier Doug Ford announced it supported an eastern extension of the line as a longer-term project. As of 2023, a business case for the eastward and westward extensions was being undertaken by the provincial government. These projects were then unfunded, and a target date for completion had not been announced. In October 2023, Metrolinx sought public feedback regarding the potential extension by posting on its website. The mode of rapid transit, station count, and line length had not been determined. The agency explained that the feedback gathered would be used to guide the initial business case for the Sheppard extension.

On March 20, 2024, City of Toronto staff presented a report to city council on corridor evaluation results for the prioritization of planned higher-order transit projects, which yielded the following results for a subway extension: eastward from Don Mills station to McCowan Road (interchange with the Scarborough subway extension of Line 2) and westward from Sheppard–Yonge station to Sheppard West station (second lowest priority).

=== Eastward extension ===
The TTC considered the eastward extension of the Sheppard line to Scarborough Centre station as one of its top priorities for rapid-transit expansion, which would have expanded rapid transit in Scarborough for the first time since the completion of the former Line 3 Scarborough. In 2015, the TTC estimated that a Sheppard subway to Scarborough Centre would have 7,800 riders per hour while 10,000 per hour was the minimum number of riders per hour considered appropriate for a subway. The maximum capacity of the subway option was about 30,000 riders per hour, approximately the load the Yonge portion of Line 1 carried in the morning rush.

In April 2019, the provincial government under Premier Doug Ford announced that it supported an eastward extension of Line 4 but included no promise of funding nor a proposed target date for completion. The province revised the proposed route to terminate and meet a then-proposed Scarborough subway extension of Line 2 Bloor–Danforth at Sheppard Avenue East and McCowan Road instead of at Scarborough Centre. The announcement noted that construction of the line would not begin until the 2030s, following the completion of the Scarborough Subway Extension.

In November 2023, Metrolinx announced preparation of an initial business case for Line 4 extensions as previously supported in April 2019, and that it was also considering a further extension of Line 4 east of McCowan Road to Meadowvale Road as part of the study limits. In June 2024, Metrolinx held several public consultations with routing concepts.

=== Westward extension ===
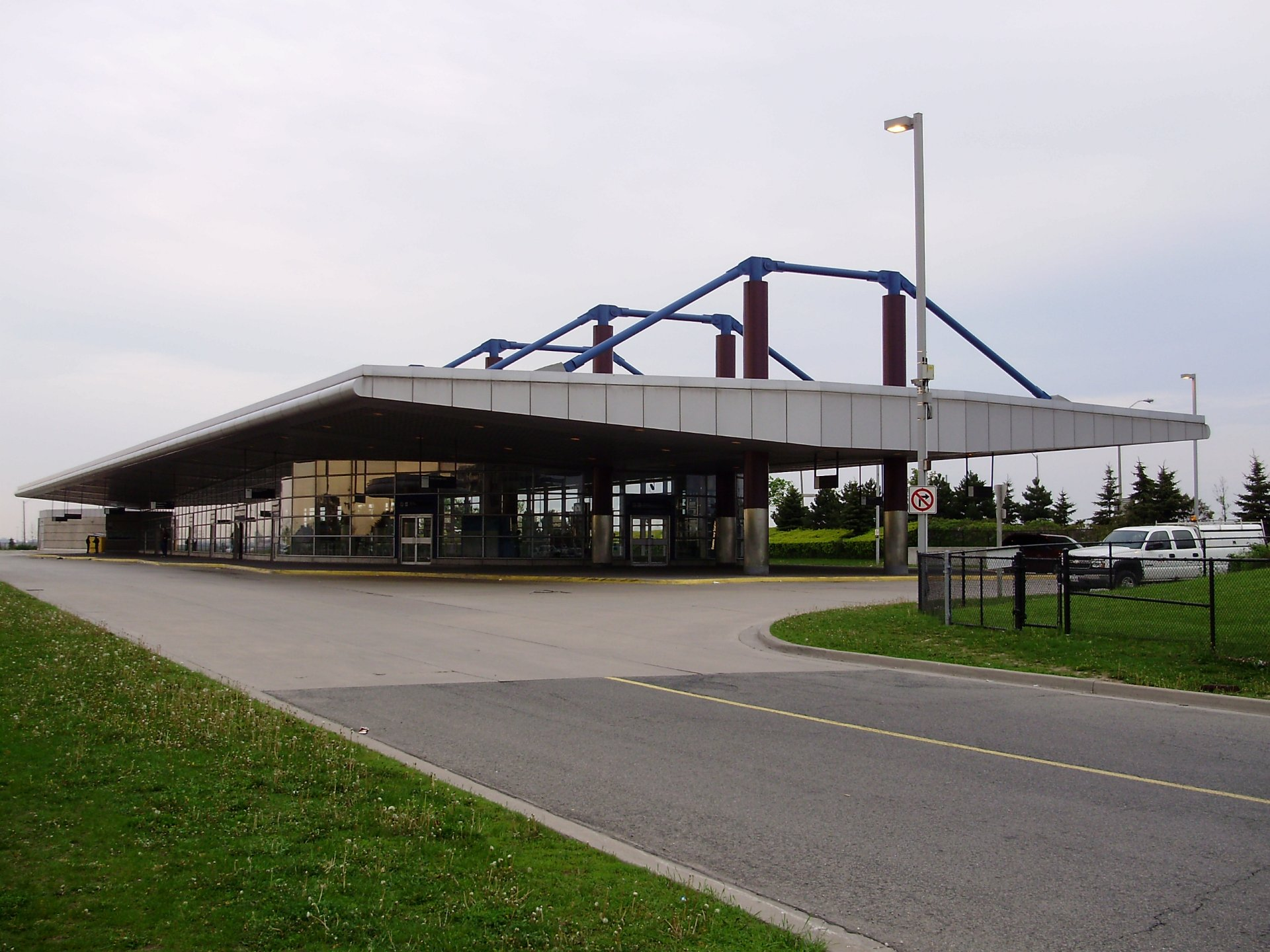
Sheppard West station on Line 1 Yonge–University would be the western terminus of the proposed extension

A separate 4.5-kilometre (2.8 mi) westward extension was proposed to Sheppard West station on Line 1. Lower population density made this expansion a much lower priority than the eastward one, as the minimal increase in ridership was insufficient to justify the costs. The approval of the Spadina subway extension to Vaughan Metropolitan Centre in York Region renewed interest in this phase, as a subway connection between Sheppard West and Sheppard–Yonge stations would significantly lower commuting times for York University students, as well as commuters travelling to and from Vaughan Metropolitan Centre and beyond. The tunnel from Sheppard–Yonge station to Welbeck Road (one block east of Senlac Road) was built for train storage at the time of original construction. In December 2009, a westward extension was again considered by the TTC to link the line to the Wilson subway yard. It was immediately dismissed due to cost. In December 2013, this extension was listed as being under consideration as an "unfunded future rapid transit project" in the City of Toronto's "Feeling Congested?" report. As of April 2019, the westward extension had neither provincial government support nor funding.

At its February 20, 2020, meeting, the Metrolinx board of directors endorsed a prioritization framework for a proposed frequent rapid transit network that was inclusive of a proposed subway extension from Sheppard–Yonge station to Sheppard West station; with a forecast ridership of 9,800 per hour in 2031 and a proposed line length of 4.3 kilometres (2.7 mi) along Sheppard Avenue West, the project scored "medium" with a preliminary benefit-cost ratio of 0.26 to 0.35.

In November 2023, Metrolinx announced preparation of an initial business case for Line 4 extensions, and that Metrolinx was also considering a westward extension of Line 4 to Sheppard West Station. In June 2024, Metrolinx held several public consultations with routing concepts.

=== Political debates and proposals ===
Since 2007, there have been a series of political debates and proposals about whether to extend Line 4 east or west, or whether Line 4 should be continued eastwards as a separate light-rail line or as a heavy-rail extension of Line 4. Major political decisions were made only to be later reversed by succeeding governments. The following sections detail the major proposals.

==== Transit City ====
In March 2007, the City of Toronto, under the mayoralty of David Miller, and the TTC released the Transit City proposal to begin a new round of transit expansion using light rail technology on dedicated rights-of-way instead of subway technology. Under this plan, the Sheppard East subway extension had been replaced by a light rail line running from Don Mills Station along Sheppard Avenue East to Meadowvale Road, where it would have met the northern terminus of an extended Line 3 Scarborough. Under this proposal, there would be no direct connection between North York City Centre and Scarborough City Centre.

==== Rob Ford era ====
As a result of the election of Rob Ford as mayor of Toronto in 2010, the western extension of the Sheppard subway to Sheppard West Station and the eastern extension to Scarborough Centre were considered a priority again. He indicated in a December 2010 interview with The Globe and Mail that all other transit projects would come second to completing the Sheppard line, stating "I'm just focusing on doing the Sheppard subway underground."

On March 31, 2011, Rob Ford announced that the proposed Sheppard East LRT line would be replaced by western and eastern extensions for the Sheppard line so that the completed line would run from Sheppard West station to Scarborough Centre station. The Ontario government approved this plan, which was estimated to cost $4.2 billion. The City of Toronto would assume complete financial responsibility for the project, which was proposed to be funded through a public–private partnership, as well as through the use of surplus funds from the proposed Eglinton Crosstown line (later renamed Line 5 Eglinton), if there were any. Massive redevelopment along the route would be needed to generate these funds, as the then-current population density and projected ridership was too low to support the cost of the expansion by itself.

In 2011, Metrolinx estimated that the westward extension to Sheppard West would be 5.45 km (3.39 mi) long, add two stations, and cost $1.48 billion. The Sheppard East extension would be 8 km (5.0 mi) long, add seven stations, and cost $2.75 billion.

Gordon Chong, head of the TTC agency tasked with analyzing the new subway plans at the time, said it was possible that no new transit development would occur along Sheppard Avenue.

==== Stintz's alternative ====
On January 23, 2012, TTC chair Karen Stintz suggested a plan to extend the line two stops eastwards funded by making the eastern portion of Line 5 Eglinton at street level. This motion was defeated by the TTC board. She then got 24 councillors (a majority) to sign a petition calling for a special council meeting for February 8 of that year.

In the meeting, council voted to build the Eglinton project according to the original Transit City plan (partly underground and partly at grade), build an at-grade Finch West LRT, and to appoint a panel to recommend whether to pursue the eastward extension of the Sheppard subway or construct the Sheppard East LRT instead. The panel reported back to council on March 31, 2012. At this council meeting, council approved light rail rather than a subway extension for Sheppard. On April 26 of that year, the motion to build the LRT was announced by the Minister of Transportation after being approved unanimously by Metrolinx. The plan still needed to be approved by Ontario's cabinet, though on June 29, 2012, the Board of Directors of Metrolinx unanimously approved the same motion approved by Metrolinx in April.

==== Early Tory era ====
During the 2014 Toronto mayoral election, incumbent mayor Rob Ford (and his brother Doug Ford, after the prior's withdrawal) were the only major candidates who supported completing Line 4 Sheppard east to McCowan Road (phase-one project) and west to Sheppard West station (phase-two project). John Tory, who won the election, did not include anything on the Sheppard corridor in his maps; instead, he favoured SmartTrack, a proposal to enhance GO Transit rail service with the city of Toronto. However, he did say that he would proceed with the LRT, although the project would not be a priority for him.

On April 27, 2015, Steven Del Duca, the Ontario Minister of Transportation, said that the LRT project would not start until at least 2021. In July 2016, Toronto City Council approved a one-stop subway extension on Line 2 Bloor–Danforth to Scarborough Centre station. During this vote, city council also approved putting an extension of Line 4 into Scarborough back into consideration.

==== Doug Ford era ====
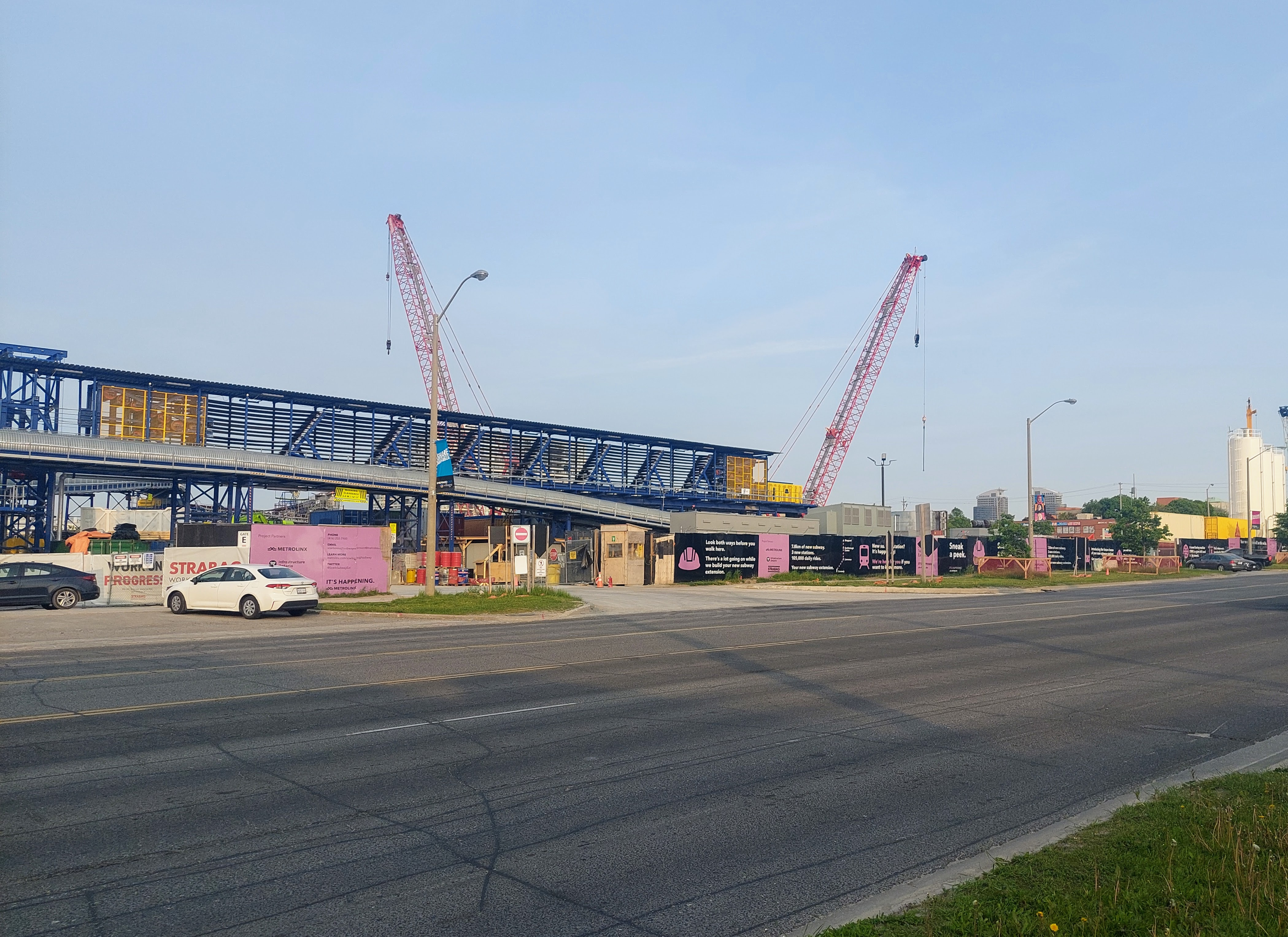
Site of Sheppard and McCowan station in 2023, which is an under-construction terminus for Line 2 Bloor–Danforth's Scarborough extension and also a proposed terminus for Line 4 Sheppard

In April 2019, Doug Ford, who had since become premier of Ontario after the 2018 provincial election, unveiled a new transportation plan for Toronto, including the new Ontario Line to replace the proposed Relief Line, an extension of Line 1 to Richmond Hill, a northeastward extension of Line 2 with new stations to replace Line 3 Scarborough, a westward extension of Line 5 Eglinton to Toronto Pearson International Airport in Mississauga and an extension of Line 4 Sheppard east to McCowan Road, where it would intersect with the Line 2 extension about 1 kilometre (0.62 mi) north of Scarborough Town Centre. However, money was not set aside in the government's budget for the Line 4 extension. During the 2022 provincial election, Doug Ford campaigned for the eastward extension of Line 4 to Scarborough to intersect with the Line 2 extension, as well as for other subway extensions in Toronto. Following Ford's re-election as premier of Ontario, the Ontario Fall Economic Statement in 2022 recommitted the government to the eastward extension by confirming planning work had continued for the Sheppard subway extension, which would extend Line 4 from its existing terminus at Don Mills station to McCowan Road to meet with the Line 2 extension's terminus.

On June 8, 2023, Associate Minister of Transportation Stan Cho announced that he and Minister of Transportation Caroline Mulroney had given official direction to agency officials to prepare an initial business case to extend Line 4 eastwards to the terminus station of the Scarborough subway extension (located at McCowan Road and Sheppard Avenue East) and to explore the potential for extending the line westwards to Sheppard West station. In November 2023, Metrolinx held public consultations to receive feedback on potential extensions along Sheppard Avenue eastward from Don Mills station to McCowan Road, and westward from Sheppard–Yonge station to Sheppard West station. Metrolinx was also considering a further extension eastwards from McCowan Road to Meadowvale Road near Rouge National Urban Park. Before this announcement, the City of Toronto was planning that its proposed Eglinton East LRT would serve Sheppard Avenue between McCowan Road and Morningside Avenue, overlapping a potential Metrolinx expansion of Line 4 east of McCowan Road. In case of an overlap, city planners would modify the Eglinton East LRT route. In June 2024, there was a public consultation regarding the Line 4 eastward extension in which the public selected their preferred alignment, with the extension to Scarborough Town Centre being the most popular among the options.

== Service frequency ==
The frequency for this line is 5 to 6 minutes at all times during scheduled hours.

On September 4, 2005, an overnight service on Sheppard Avenue East was introduced. The 385 Sheppard East Blue Night bus route provides late-night service when the subway is not in operation with the frequency of 30 minutes. This service terminates at Sheppard–Yonge station and follows Sheppard Avenue East to Meadowvale Road.

== See also ==
- MoveOntario 2020
- List of transport megaprojects
