= Sheppard East LRT =

Proposed light rail line in Toronto, Canada

Overview
- Status: Cancelled
- Owner: Metrolinx
- Locale: Toronto, Ontario
- Termini: Don Mills; Meadowvale
- Stations: 26

Service
- Type: Light rail
- System: Toronto subway
- Operator: Toronto Transit Commission
- Rolling stock: Flexity Freedom

Technical
- Line length: 13 km (8.1 mi)
- Track gauge: 1,435 mm (4 ft 8 1/2 in) standard gauge
- Electrification: 750 V DC overhead

The Sheppard East LRT was a proposed light rail line in Toronto, Ontario, Canada. It was first announced as part of the Transit City proposal in 2007. The Sheppard East LRT as proposed was to be 13 kilometres (8.1 mi) long, travel along Sheppard Avenue from Don Mills subway station to east of Morningside Avenue, and be operated by the Toronto Transit Commission (TTC).

In May 2009, funding was approved by the provincial and federal governments. In December 2010, Toronto mayor Rob Ford cancelled the line, along with the rest of Transit City, in favour of constructing underground subway lines. However, in March 2012, Toronto city council re-instated the Sheppard East LRT at a special city council meeting. In 2016, it was reported that the line had been indefinitely deferred and would possibly be replaced by a competing proposal to extend Line 4 Sheppard. In April 2019, Ontario premier Doug Ford announced that the provincial government would extend Line 4 Sheppard to McCowan Road at some unspecified time in the future, replacing the proposed Sheppard East LRT.

== History ==
On March 16, 2007, the Sheppard East LRT was first proposed as part of Toronto mayor David Miller's Transit City proposal.

In May 2009, funding was approved by the provincial and federal governments. The line was to open from Don Mills station to Meadowvale Road in 2013. The project was to include a new train yard at Conlins Road. Metrolinx had originally budgeted CA$944.5 million from 2009 through 2014 for the design and construction of the line.

On December 21, 2009, construction for the line began at Agincourt GO Station. Detailed engineering had been initiated for the grade separation of Sheppard Avenue East and the GO Transit tracks east of Kennedy Road.

In May 2010, Metrolinx revised the opening date to mid-2014.

Following the municipal election in December 2010, Toronto mayor Rob Ford cancelled the line along with the rest of Transit City in favour of constructing underground subway lines. However, in March 2012, Toronto city council re-instated it at a special city council meeting.

In June 2012, the province of Ontario announced that construction of the Sheppard East LRT would not resume until 2017, nor finish until 2021. By December 2012, the underpass construction needed for the Sheppard LRT at Agincourt GO Station was completed to enhance traffic flow as well as enhance the safety and reliability of GO Transit.

On April 27, 2015, Transportation Minister Steven Del Duca announced that construction of the Sheppard East LRT would not start until at least 2021. According to the minister, the delay in starting the Sheppard East LRT was due to limits in the province's capacity to do infrastructure work on multiple projects at the same time.

In January 2018, the TTC anticipated the line would open sometime between 2028 and 2032.

In July 2016, a Toronto Star article reported that the Sheppard LRT had been deferred indefinitely. Funding for the line was withdrawn and reallocated to the Finch West LRT in 2017, with political interest shifting to possibly converting the Sheppard East project into a subway extension of Line 4 Sheppard. On April 10, 2019, Premier Doug Ford announced that the provincial government would extend Line 4 Sheppard to McCowan Road at some unspecified time in the future, thus replacing the proposed Sheppard East LRT.

== Route layout ==
The Sheppard East LRT line as proposed runs for 13 km (8.1 mi) from Don Mills station at Don Mills Road in North York along Sheppard Avenue East to east of Morningside Avenue in Scarborough. The line would run in a 1.1-kilometre (0.68 mi) tunnel between Don Mills and Consumers Road, and for 11.9 km (7.4 mi) along the surface of Sheppard Avenue from Consumers Road to Morningside Avenue. The surface portion would operate in a dedicated lane in the centre of the street.

At Don Mills, the LRT and Line 4 Sheppard subway would use the same platform level, so that riders could simply walk down the platform and board the other vehicle. In addition to the underground stop at Don Mills, Metrolinx said there would be up to 26 surface stops along the route.

Proposed stops
Stop	Notes
Don Mills	Underground connection to Sheppard and proposed Don Mills LRT
Consumers Road	
Victoria Park Avenue	
Pharmacy Avenue	
Palmdale Drive	
Warden Avenue	
Bay Mills Boulevard	
Birchmount Road	
Allanford Road	
Kennedy Road	
Agincourt GO Station	Connection to the Stouffville line
Midland Avenue	
Brimley Road	
Brownspring Road	
McCowan Road	
White Haven	
Shorting Road	
Massie Street	
Markham Road	
Progress Avenue	
Washburn Way	
Burrows Hall	
Neilson Road	
Murison Boulevard	
Brenyon Way	
Morningside Avenue	Connection to proposed Eglinton East LRT

== Potential extensions ==
These proposed segments were not part of Transit City.

=== West to Finch station ===
This proposal would extended to the Sheppard East LRT north to Finch Avenue from Don Mills, then west on Finch Avenue East to Finch station. From there it would continue along Finch Avenue West as the Finch West LRT line. This alignment would provide a seamless crosstown line across northern Toronto.

=== East to Durham Region ===
This proposal would have extended the Sheppard East LRT east into Durham Region from the planned eastern terminus at Meadowvale Road. This extension would cross the Toronto/Durham Region border and continue to an undisclosed location within Durham Region.

== Transfer with Line 4 Sheppard ==
The TTC investigated several options for the transfer at or near Don Mills Road with the existing Line 4 Sheppard subway. The main obstacle is Highway 404, which the LRT may have to tunnel under, and the fact that the subway is located 18 metres (59 ft) below grade at this point.

=== Original options ===
1. Surface LRT Connection: Hwy 404 bridge expanded to maintain existing traffic lanes and incorporate two lanes for LRT in the centre. Traffic lanes reduced near Don Mills Road to allow LRT stop on surface, in the centre of Sheppard - a wide centre platform would include stairs and elevators connecting to the mezzanine level of the subway station.
2. Underground LRT Connection 1: Tunnel under Highway 404 beginning west of Consumers Road and connecting to the mezzanine/concourse level of the subway (one level below the surface, one level above the subway.)
3. Underground LRT Connection 2: Tunnel under Highway 404 beginning west of Consumers Road and "butting up" against the east end of the subway platform (two levels below the surface.)
4. Subway Extension 1: Extend the subway to Consumers Road area and build an LRT connection there.
5. Subway Extension 2: Shallow subway extension to Consumers Road with LRT station in the middle of Sheppard Avenue and a direct passage to the subway below.

=== Recommended options ===
==== Option 3 – Underground LRT Connection 2 ====
Option 3 proposed building an underground connection to the subway platform level at Don Mills. The subway platform would be extended east, with LRT tracks built on either side, allowing for a level transfer.

For customers east of Victoria Park and destined to the subway, Option 3 has the same pros as Option 5, but at a lower cost, and the tunnel construction would be designed to allow for a future subway extension. But it has the cons of separation between subway and LRT still under policy discussion; separation between vehicles could be 100 to 125 metres (328 to 410 ft).

==== Option 5 – Subway Extension 2 ====
Option 5 proposed building a shallow subway extension to Consumers Road and connecting with the Sheppard East LRT at a surface-level LRT station. The LRT station would be built in the middle of Sheppard Avenue (east of Consumers Road), with direct passageways to the Line 4 station below.

Option 5 avoids the need for travellers from the business park to travel one stop, then transfer to the subway as per Option 3; given that, it is seen as a more effective catalyst for more dense, transit-oriented development in the area of the station. This option, however, is much more expensive than Option 3 and requires more detailed design work to determine if a "shallow" subway extension is achievable. More work is required to determine the depth needed to avoid the settlement near the Highway 404 bridge and to avoid the large, 6-metre-deep (20 ft) sanitary sewer near Consumers Road.

=== Decision ===
The TTC decided on option 3.

== Delay and restoration of the project ==
In April 2011, Toronto mayor Rob Ford and the province of Ontario announced a transit plan that included the subway extensions and cancelled the Sheppard East LRT. Despite the inclusion of the extensions, no public funding was allocated for construction and work on the LRT was to be abandoned at significant cost. Instead of building the previously-funded LRT, Mayor Ford proposed soliciting private financing for a subway extension; however, no specific plans for raising the funding were announced, and Gordon Chong, head of the TTC agency tasked with analyzing the new subway plans, suggested that the project would not be feasible without a detailed funding plan including new taxes and levies. Lack of confidence in Mayor Ford's subway proposal eventually led council, under the guidance of TTC chair Karen Stintz, to appoint an expert panel to review the options for rapid transit on Sheppard East and to present a preferred alternative. On March 21, 2012, city council received the report, authored by Professor Eric Miller, which strongly recommended proceeding with the original LRT plan. On March 22, after over a day and a half of debate, city council formally endorsed a return to the LRT plan for Sheppard east. In June 2012, the province of Ontario announced that construction of the Sheppard east LRT would not resume until 2017 or finish until 2021.

On April 27, 2015, the government of Ontario and the City of Toronto announced that work on the Finch LRT would begin in 2016. Work on the Sheppard East LRT was expected to start once the work on the Finch LRT has been completed, sometime in the early to mid 2020s. In July 2016, a Toronto Star article said the Sheppard LRT had been deferred indefinitely. That same month Toronto City Council voted to approve a one stop extension on Line 2 (Bloor–Danforth Line) from Kennedy Station North East to Scarborough Center. This same vote reopened to consideration the possibility of extending the Sheppard Subway east into Scarborough. Therefore the Sheppard East LRT will not be built until a final decision is made on the Sheppard Subway extension.

== Economic benefits ==
There has been an ongoing discussion as to economic benefits of Toronto's different rapid transit choices, including the benefits of building an LRT along Sheppard. The Toronto Star reported on the views of Andre Sorensen, who compared the likely economic stimulus of building an LRT along Sheppard, with the likely economic benefits of building Mayor John Tory's Smart Track surface subway, or building the 7-kilometre (4.3 mi) extension of the TTC's heavy rail system from Kennedy station to Sheppard. Sorenson, a University of Toronto Scarborough professor of Human Geography, had recently published a paper on this topic. His team concluded that not only would the $1 billion provide more economic stimulus per dollar than the other two more expensive routes, but that it would provide more economic benefits in absolute terms. Sorenson also asserted that, in addition to being cheaper, and providing more economic benefits, the Sheppard LRT could be completed years earlier than the other two routes, and that, unlike the other two routes, its entire capital cost would be funded by the province, not by the City of Toronto.

== Operations ==
Metrolinx had projected that the LRT would see 3,000 riders per hour in the peak direction by 2031. A Toronto Star report had estimated annual operating and maintenance costs to be $38.1 million in 2025, before deducting fare revenue and costs saved by eliminating parallel bus service.

According to the TTC, the six bus routes that serve Sheppard Ave between Don Mills and Morningside averaged 35,800 riders per weekday. The TTC had forecast 17 million annual riders on the Sheppard East LRT upon completion.

== See also ==
- Light rail in Canada
- Toronto streetcar system
- Toronto subway
- Line 5 Eglinton
