= Justice Shepherd =

Justice Shepherd or Shepard may refer to:

- Allan G. Shepherd (c. 1923–1989), associate justice of the Idaho Supreme Court
- James E. Shepherd (1847–1910), associate justice and chief justice of the North Carolina Supreme Court
- Randall T. Shepard (born 1946), associate justice and chief justice of the Supreme Court of Indiana
- Seth Shepard (1847–1917), associate justice and chief justice of the Court of Appeals of the District of Columbia

== See also ==
- Judge Shepherd (disambiguation)
- Judge Sheppard (disambiguation)
