= Shepherding =

The term Shepherding has a number of uses:

- Sheep farming or sheep husbandry
- The work done by a Shepherd
- Shepherding Movement, a style of Christian discipleship within Charismatic churches
- Shepherding (Australian rules football) - a legal tactic to prevent another player from taking possession of the ball or guide them away from the ball

== See also ==
- Sheepherder (disambiguation)
- Shepherd (name)
