= Crosstown =

Crosstown may refer to:

== Transportation ==
- IND Crosstown Line, a subway line in New York, New York, United States
- Line 5 Eglinton, a light rail line in Toronto, Ontario, Canada, also known as "the Crosstown"
- MBTA crosstown bus routes, bus routes in and around Boston, Massachusetts, United States
- Minnesota State Highway 62 (east), referred to as "the Crosstown"
- A cross-city route (except in North American English)

== Other ==
- Crosstown, Missouri, an unincorporated community in Perry County, Missouri
- Crosstown, Ohio, an unincorporated community
- "Crosstown" (Glenn Miller song), a 1940 song recorded by the band Glenn Miller and His Orchestra on RCA Bluebird
- Smart Crosstown, a concept car by Smart
- Crosstown Shootout, an annual college basketball game between the University of Cincinnati and Xavier University

== See also ==
- Crosstown Expressway (disambiguation)
- Crosstown Line (disambiguation)
- Crosstown traffic (disambiguation)
