= Crosstown Freeway =

The Crosstown Freeway can refer to three different freeways in the US state of California:

- Crosstown Freeway (San Francisco) refers to a never-built freeway through Glen Canyon Park
- Crosstown Freeway (San Bernardino) refers to a segment of Route 210 in San Bernardino.
- Crosstown Freeway (Stockton) refers to a segment of State Route 4 which was built in the 1970s

== See also ==
- Crosstown Expressway
