= Crosstown Line =

Crosstown Line may refer to the following transit lines:

== New York City ==
- IND Crosstown Line in New York (rapid transit)
- Crosstown Line (Brooklyn surface) (bus, formerly streetcar)
- 39th Street Crosstown Line on Church Avenue in Brooklyn (bus, formerly streetcar)

== Toronto ==
- Line 5 Eglinton, an under-construction rapid transit line in Toronto, Ontario, Canada, also known as the Crosstown Line

== Washington D.C. ==
- Crosstown Line (Washington, D.C.) (bus line)
