= Eglinton Maintenance and Storage Facility =

Rail yard for Line 5 Eglinton

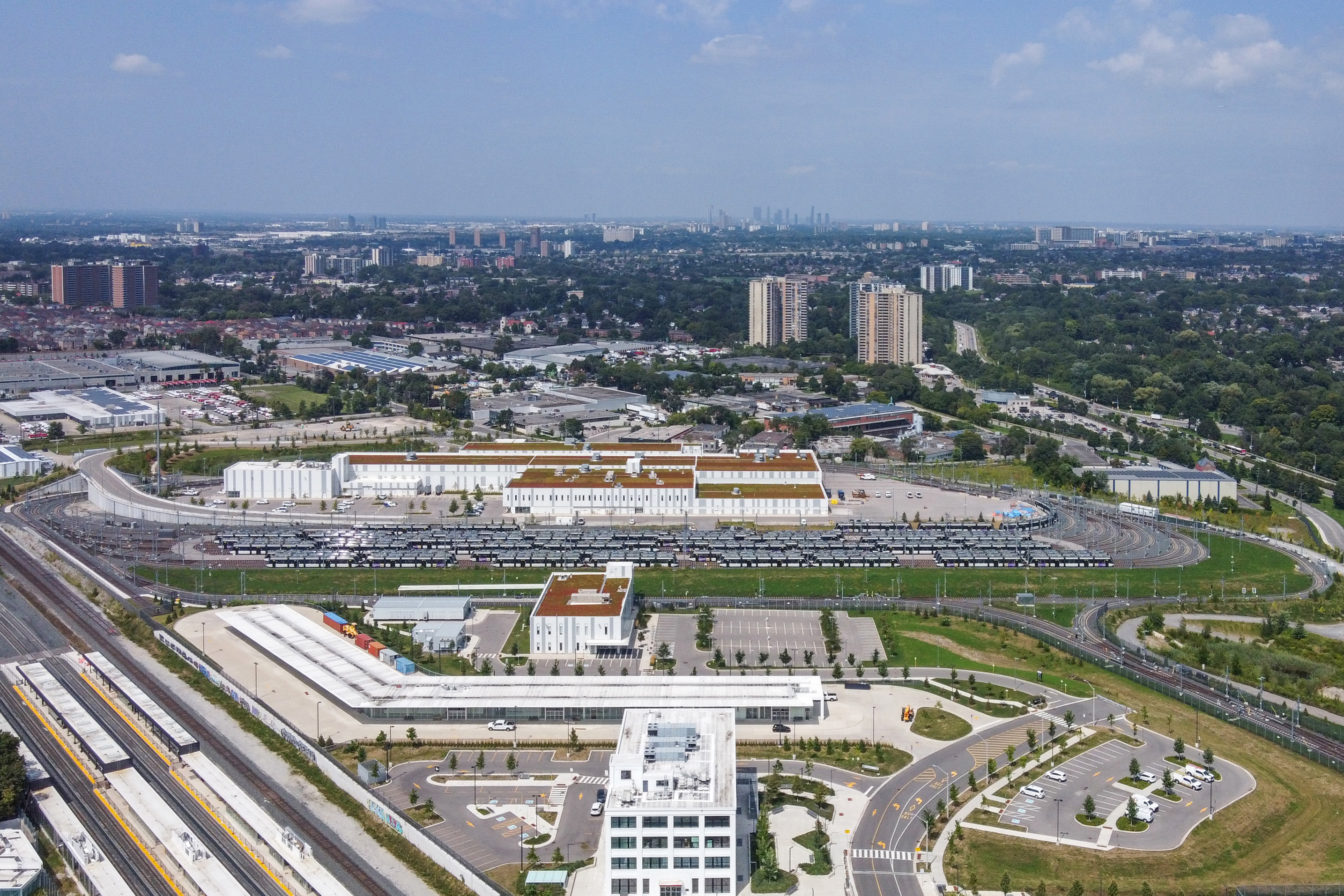
- Aerial view of Eglinton Maintenance and Storage Facility in 2024

General information
- Location: 70 Industry Street, Toronto, Ontario; Canada
- Coordinates: 43°41′25″N 79°29′16″W
- Owner: Metrolinx
- Operator: Metrolinx plans to contract with a third party to operate the maintenance facility
- Line: Line 5 Eglinton

Construction
- Structure type: Flexity Freedom vehicle maintenance and storage facility

Other information
- Status: Open

History
- Opened: October 2018 (facility); February 8, 2026; 6 months ago (Line 5)
Location

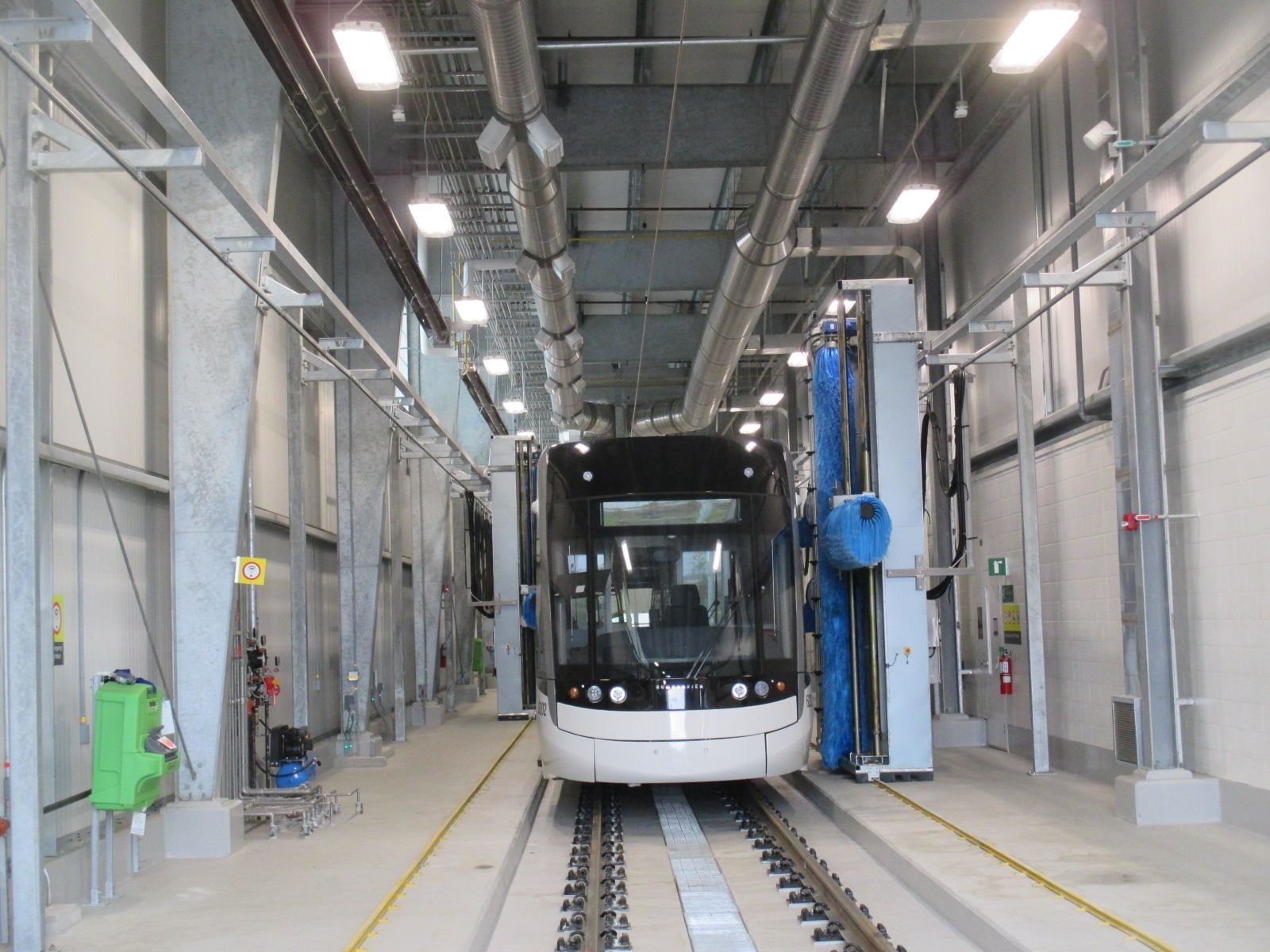
Bombardier Flexity Freedom LRV on the car-wash track

The Eglinton Maintenance and Storage Facility is a rail yard and vehicle service centre for Line 5 Eglinton of the Toronto subway. The facility is located near the line's western terminus at Mount Dennis station, on lands formerly occupied by Kodak's Toronto campus.

The Eglinton line uses Flexity Freedom vehicles on 1,435 mm (4 ft 8 1/2 in) standard gauge and is not connected to the Toronto streetcar system, which uses 4 ft 10 7/8 in (1,495 mm) Toronto gauge.

The facility was substantially complete in October 2018, and was ready for the delivery of the first Flexity Freedom vehicle on January 8, 2019. Five more were delivered by February 2019.

== Grounds ==
The facility's footprint is 23 hectares (57 acres). The facility will initially service 76 Bombardier Flexity Freedom vehicles but has capacity for 135 vehicles to handle any expansion of Line 5 Eglinton. According to Metrolinx, the site's ultimate capacity could be 162 Flexity Freedom vehicles.

Structures within the MSF will include:

- Vehicle cleaning & inspection facility with a train wash, cleaning bay, and an automated vehicle inspection system
- Vehicle cleaning staff building
- Operations company building
- Maintenance building to perform all major repairs
- Bridge over the CN/CP rail corridor allowing staff and service vehicles to access the MSF from the west
- Backup power facility
- Radio mast with a height of 40 metres (130 ft)

The October 2015 design for the facility incorporated two artificial ponds, and green tracks, so its landscaping would better integrate with the adjacent parkland in the Black Creek valley. The facility will have a "green roof".

The EMSF has a radio mast for a central radio system to communicate with staff along the line such as dispatchers, operators and maintenance personnel. Three other stations will also have radio masts. The masts at the EMSF and Kennedy station will be 40 metres (130 ft) tall; Forest Hill and Laird stations will have shorter roof-mounted masts that rise 15 metres (49 ft) from ground level.

== Operations ==
Automatic train control (ATC) is used to move trains within the facility without a driver on board. ATC moves trains automatically around the facility for cleaning, inspection and storage, and will deliver trains from the yard to a hand-over area where drivers take control to move trains onto the mainline tracks.

A backup power facility is being constructed adjacent to the CN/CP rail corridor at the northwest corner of the Eglinton facility. In the event of a widespread power outage, the new facility will provide Line 5 vehicles with up to four hours of electrical power. The facility will use lithium-ion batteries, which will be charged overnight in order to reduce peak-period power demands and operating costs. The batteries will have a capacity of 10 MW / 30 MWh, equivalent to what is needed to power 8000 homes for a year. The roof of the facility will have about 250 solar panels to generate 90 kW DC of electricity. In addition to providing emergency power, the battery power would be used daily during peak hours to avoid Ontario Hydro's peak hour surcharge.

== History ==
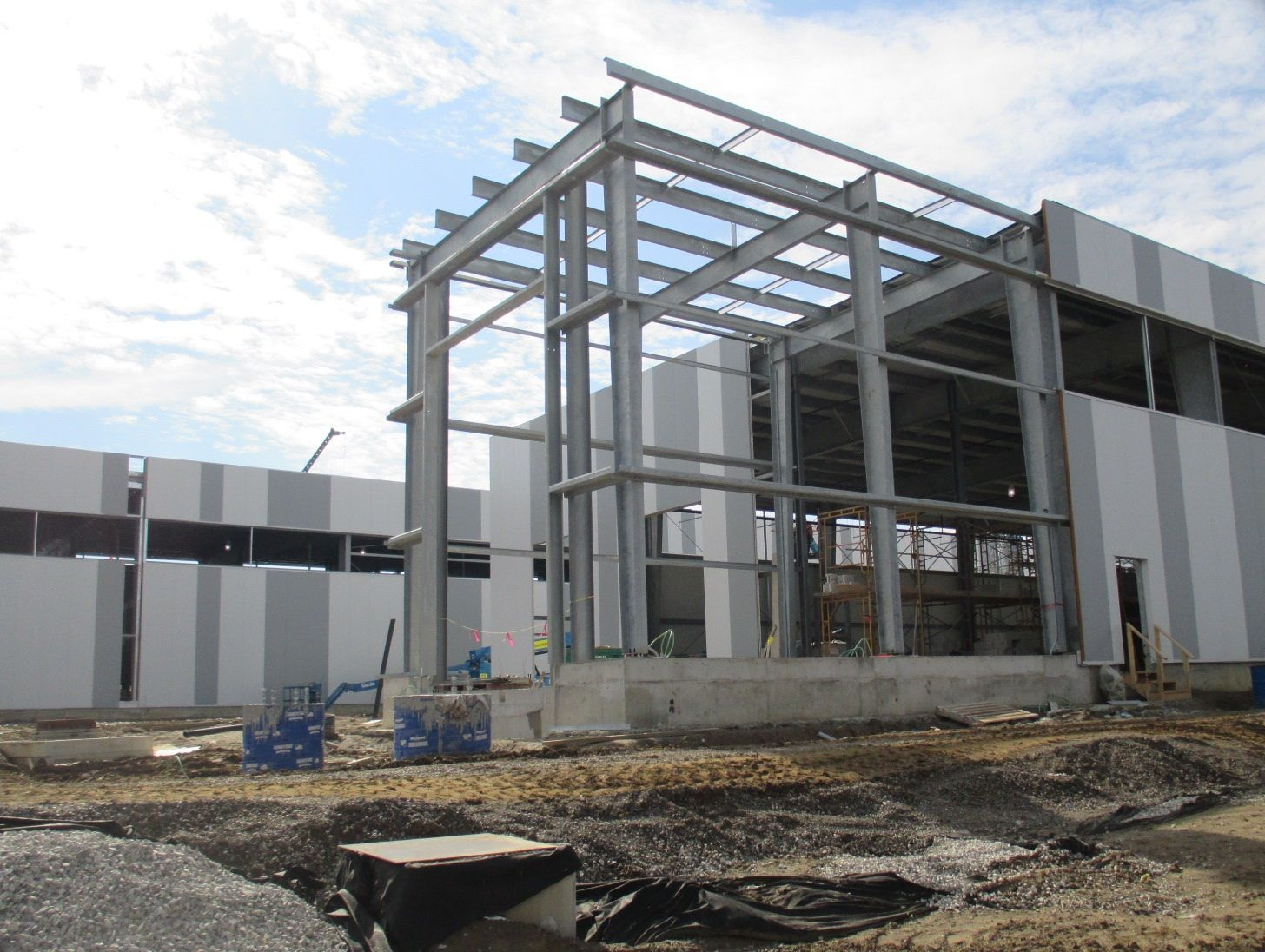
Eglinton MSF building under construction in October 2017 near Industry Street and Bertrel Road

The site was chosen because it was a sufficiently large "brownfield" immediately adjacent to one terminus of the line. At first, Metrolinx was not open to input from neighbouring residents, but in May 2013, they announced that they would organize a mechanism for taking feedback.

In 2013, Metrolinx announced that the facility would not be operated by the TTC, and they would contract with a private company to operate it instead.

Originally, the backup power facility was to have a natural gas–fired generator to power Line 5 in order to avoid peak demand times on the provincial power grid and to handle a power outage. The facility would have saved about 40 per cent on the price of electricity and would have been 25 metres (82 ft) wide, 62 metres (203 ft) long and 9 metres (30 ft) tall. Some local residents and environmental activists were critical of Metrolinx's plan to use a backup generator powered by fossil fuel. Thus, on March 28, 2017, the province announced that the facility would use a system of batteries instead of a natural gas generator and that the battery system's operating costs would not be greater than the operating cost of a gas backup power system.

By October 2018, the Eglinton Maintenance and Storage Facility was substantially complete and on January 8, 2019, received delivery of the first Flexity Freedom vehicle.

In April 2021, an LRV made the first test of automatic train control within the EMSF grounds. In the same month, testing on the communication system between Keelesdale station and the EMSF was completed.
