= Mount Pleasant station (Toronto) =

Toronto subway station

Mount Pleasant
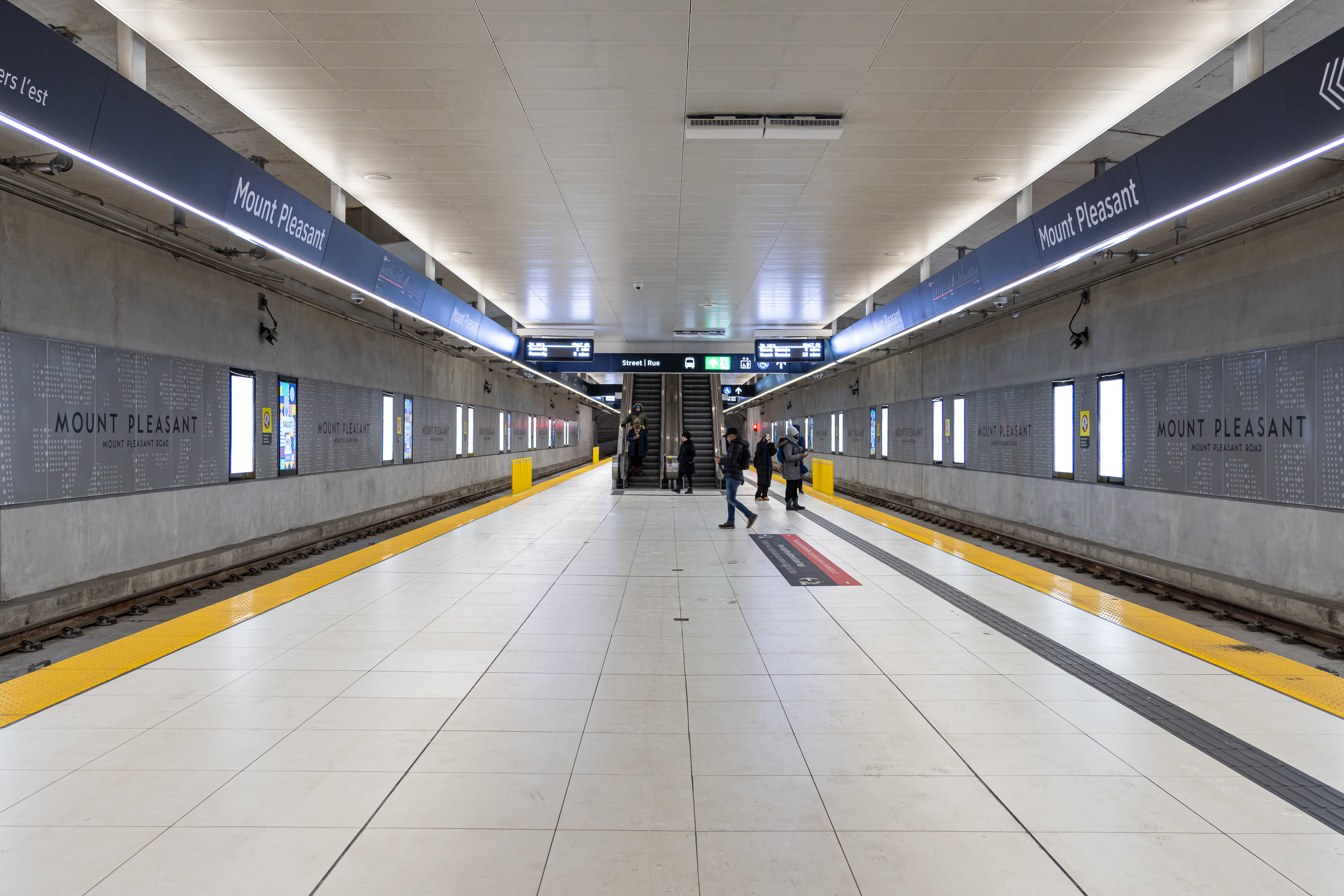
- Mount Pleasant station platform

General information
- Location: 256 Eglinton Avenue East; Toronto, Ontario; Canada
- Coordinates: 43°42′30.2″N 79°23′24.6″W
- Owner: Metrolinx
- Platforms: Centre platform
- Tracks: 2
- Connections: TTC buses: 34 Eglinton; 74 Mount Pleasant; 103 Mount Pleasant North; 334 Eglinton

Construction
- Structure type: Underground
- Accessible: Yes
- Architect: NORR

History
- Opened: February 8, 2026; 9 months ago

Services
Preceding station	Toronto Transit Commission	Following station
Eglinton towards Mount Dennis	Line 5 Eglinton	Leaside towards Kennedy
Location

Mount Pleasant is an underground Toronto subway station on Line 5 Eglinton in Toronto, Ontario, Canada. The station is located in North Toronto at the intersection of Mount Pleasant Road and Eglinton Avenue. Nearby destinations include Northern Secondary School, North Toronto Collegiate Institute, and the Davisville Village neighbourhood.

== Description ==
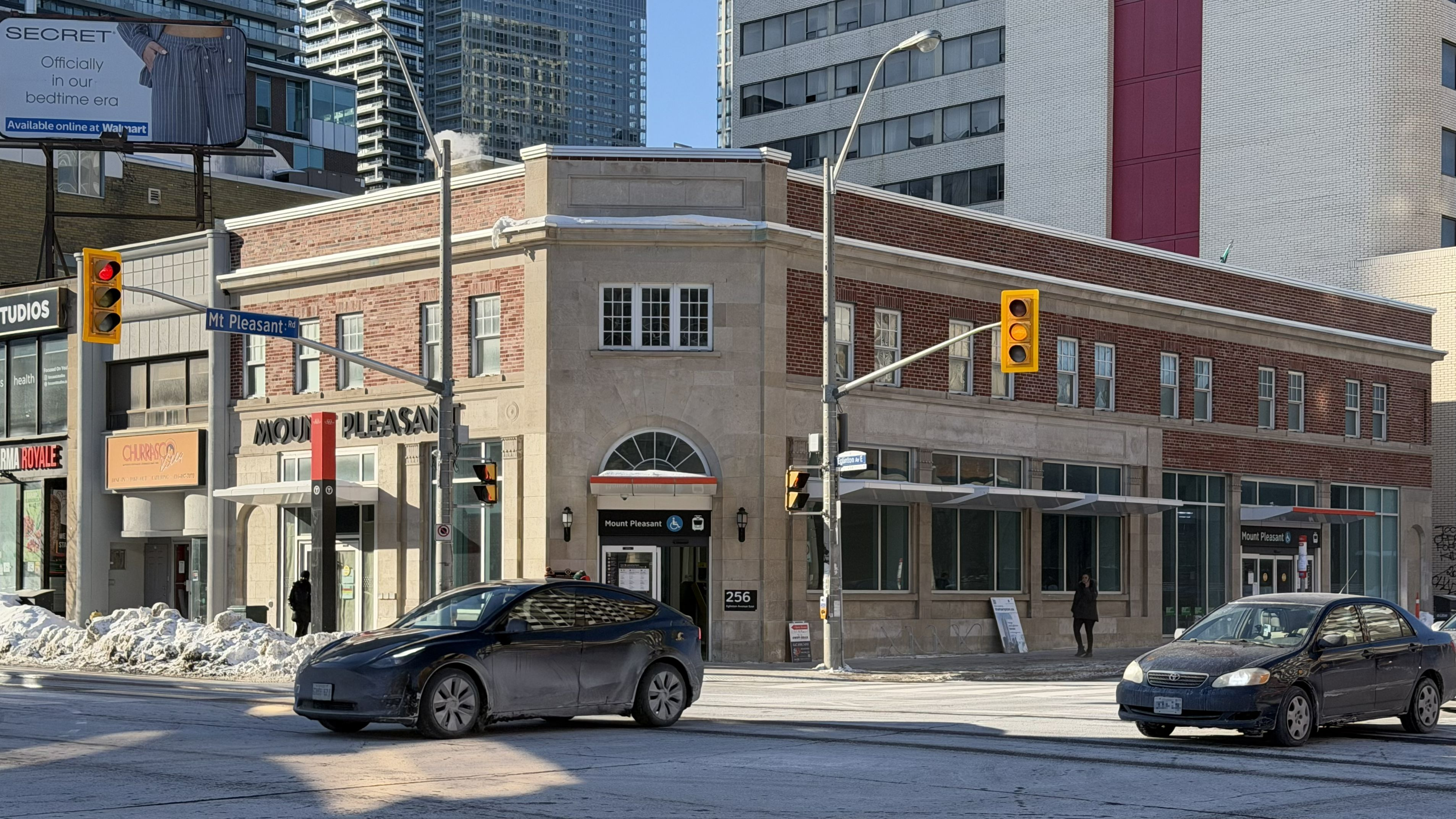
Main station entrance in February 2026, located in a converted historic bank building

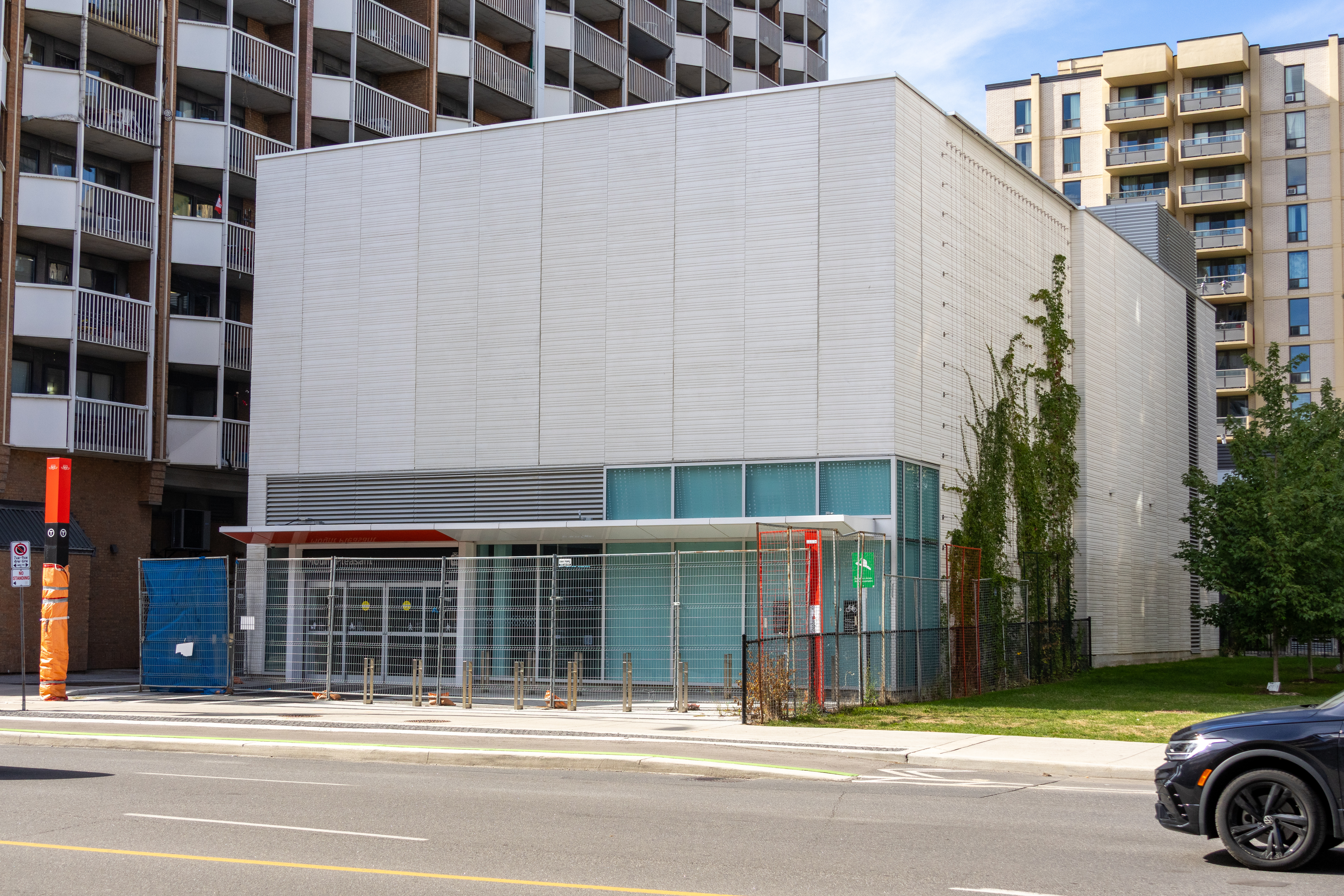
Secondary entrance in August 2025

The station has two entrances. The main, accessible entrance is at the northwest corner of Eglinton Avenue and Mount Pleasant Road. The secondary entrance is just east of Mount Pleasant Road on the north side. The station has storage for 30 bicycles.

The station was designed by NORR, following an architectural concept designed by architects gh3* from Toronto and Daoust Lestage Lizotte Stecker from Montreal. As with other stations on Line 5, architectural features include natural light from large windows and skylights, steel structures painted white, and orange accents (the colour of the line). The main entrance of the station at 256–258 Eglinton Avenue East was the location of a former branch of the Imperial Bank of Canada (later CIBC), in a building originally designed by architect Herbert Horner in 1928. Metrolinx had the building's façade disassembled brick-by-brick, catalogued, labelled and stored for reassembly upon completion of the station's construction. Only the building's façade was preserved.

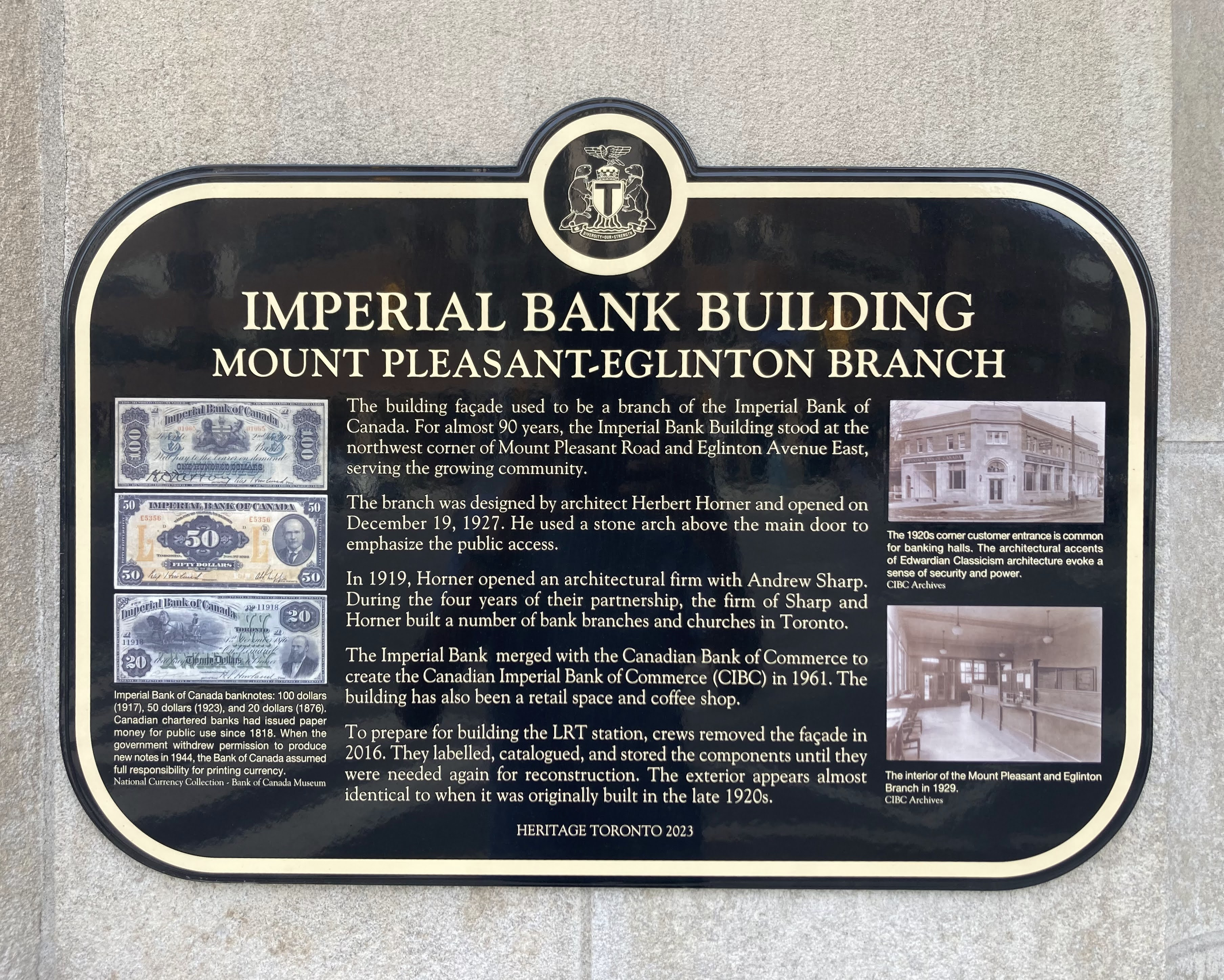
Plaque installed by Heritage Toronto at the main entrance in 2023

== Surface connections ==
The following bus routes serve Mount Pleasant station:

Route	Name	Additional information
34	Eglinton	Westbound to Mount Dennis station and eastbound to Kennedy station
74	Mount Pleasant	Southbound to St. Clair station and westbound to Eglinton station
103	Mount Pleasant North	Westbound to Eglinton station and northbound to Doncliffe loop
334A	Eglinton	Blue Night service; eastbound to Kennedy station and westbound to Renforth Drive and Pearson Airport (On-street connection)
334B	Eglinton	Blue Night service; eastbound to Finch Avenue East and Neilson Road via Morningside Avenue and westbound to Mount Dennis station (On-street connection)
