= Crosstown traffic =

Crosstown traffic may refer to:

- Crosstown traffic, the phenomenon of gridlocking in New York City and other places
- "Crosstown Traffic" (song), a 1968 song by The Jimi Hendrix Experience
- Crosstown Traffic, a television show starring Aries Spears
- Crosstown Traffic: Jimi Hendrix and Post-War Pop, a biography by Charles Shaar Murray
- Crosstown Traffic (film), a 1995 American TV movie

== See also ==
- Crosstime Traffic, a book series by Harry Turtledove
