= Crosstown Expressway =

Crosstown Expressway may refer to:

- Crosstown Expressway (Chicago), a formerly proposed highway route in Chicago, Illinois, United States as Interstate 494
- Crosstown Expressway (Philadelphia), an unbuilt highway in Philadelphia that was to be a part of Interstate 695
- Crosstown Expressway (Toronto), a cancelled expressway project in Toronto, Ontario, Canada
- A portion of Interstate 244 in Tulsa, Oklahoma, United States, known as the Crosstown Expressway
- Interstate 579 in Pittsburgh, an expressway known as the Crosstown Boulevard
- Lee Roy Selmon Crosstown Expressway, a limited access toll road in Hillsborough County, Florida, United States
- Minnesota State Highway 62 (Hennepin County), referred to locally as the Crosstown
- Oklahoma City Crosstown Expressway, a section of Interstate 40 in Oklahoma City, Oklahoma, United States
- Tampa Bay Crosstown Expressway System
- Crosstown Parkway (Port St. Lucie), a high-capacity east/west roadway linking Interstate 95 and U.S. Route 1/State Road 5 in Port St. Lucie, Florida, United States.
- Texas State Highway 286, a freeway in Corpus Christi, TX is locally known as Crosstown Expressway.
