= Line 5 Eglinton =

Light rail line in Toronto, Ontario

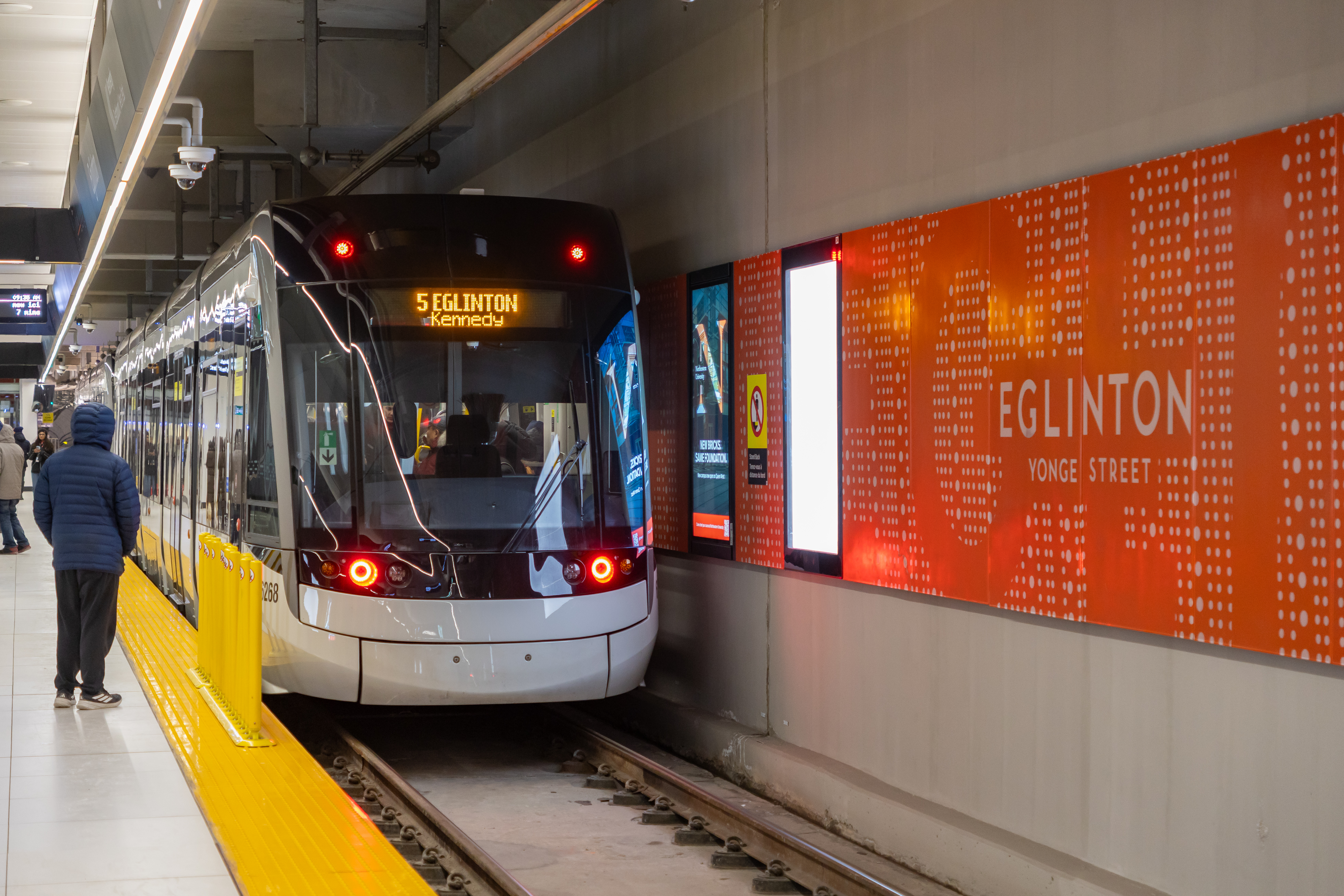
- Flexity Freedom train at Eglinton station

Overview
- Status: Operational
- Owner: Metrolinx
- Locale: Toronto, Ontario, Canada
- Termini: Mount Dennis; Kennedy
- Stations: 25 (7 under construction)
- Website: Official route page

Service
- Type: Light rail
- System: Toronto subway
- Operator: Toronto Transit Commission
- Depot: Eglinton Maintenance and Storage Facility
- Rolling stock: Flexity Freedom

History
- Planned opening: West extension: 2031; 5 years' time
- Opened: February 8, 2026; 9 months ago

Technical
- Line length: 19 km (12 mi); 9.2 km (5.7 mi) (under construction)
- Track gauge: 1,435 mm (4 ft 8 1/2 in) standard gauge
- Electrification: Overhead line, 750 V DC
- Operating speed: In tunnel: 80 km/h (50 mph); On surface: 60 km/h (37 mph)
- Signalling: Alstom Cityflo 650 CBTC
Route map

Line 5 Eglinton, also known as the Eglinton Crosstown LRT or the Crosstown, is a light rail transit line in Toronto, Ontario, Canada. Operated by the Toronto Transit Commission (TTC) as part of the Toronto subway, it has 25 stations and is 19 kilometres (11.8 mi) long. Service on the line began on February 8, 2026, as part of a phased opening. It uses standard gauge rather than the broad Toronto gauge used by the three older heavy rail subway lines.

The line was conceived in 2007 during the administration of Toronto mayor David Miller as part of Transit City, a large-scale transit expansion plan that included several light rail lines proposed across the city. While the plan was later dropped by successive municipal governments, only the Eglinton Crosstown LRT received support and funding from the Government of Ontario under Premier Kathleen Wynne.

The line's construction was overseen by Metrolinx in two phases. The first phase of the 19-kilometre (12 mi) line includes 25 stops along Eglinton Avenue, from Mount Dennis station mostly underground to Laird station, after which it runs predominantly at-grade within the street's median to Kennedy station in Scarborough, where it connects underground with Line 2 Bloor–Danforth, and GO Transit. Automatic train control is used in the tunnelled sections. This first phase had an estimated cost of CA$12.82 billion; the cost when the contract was awarded was pegged at $9.1 billion, although the cost was originally estimated at $11 billion.

A second phase, a 9.2-kilometre (5.7 mi) westward extension from Mount Dennis, will run mostly underground or elevated to Renforth station, with seven new stations. The second phase is expected to cost $4.7 billion and to be completed by 2031. Construction of the westward extension to Renforth station began in July 2021. The extension would bring the Toronto subway system into Mississauga.

Two future extensions were planned: an eastern extension to the University of Toronto Scarborough and a northwestern extension towards Toronto Pearson International Airport. In 2022, the city of Toronto converted the eastern extension into a city project and a separate line known as the Eglinton East LRT using light rail technology incompatible with the Line 5 technology.

Construction of the first phase of the line began in 2011 and was originally planned to be complete in 2020, but the opening date was revised several times, with Metrolinx next expecting the line to be substantially complete by September 2022. After revising the opening date of the central section to 2023 and then, amid ongoing legal action against Crosslinx (the construction consortium), Metrolinx stated they believed there was no credible schedule to complete the project. By September 2023, the central section was estimated to be 97 percent complete, although Metrolinx refused to provide an estimated completion date. On December 2, 2025, after a 30-day trial of the line, Metrolinx announced it would hand over operations to the TTC, which would determine an opening date. In early February 2026, the TTC set February 8, 2026, as the start date for a phased opening.

== History ==
=== Background ===
The origins of Line 5 Eglinton can be traced to the 1985 Network 2011 plan conceived by the Metropolitan Toronto government. The plan included a busway along Eglinton Avenue, to be completed by 2003. In 1986, a coalition of City of York and Etobicoke Metro councillors and the Regional Municipality of Peel persuaded Metro Council to include an Eglinton West line in a new Transit Network Plan. Work on a new 4-kilometre (2.5 mi) subway line began in 1994 at an estimated cost of CA$740 million, with the line extending the subway westwards from Cedarvale station (then known as Eglinton West station) to Black Creek Drive. However, construction was halted following the election in 1995, which saw Mike Harris take power and led to the cancellation of the Eglinton West line, with the existing tunnel quickly filled in.

=== Original concept ===
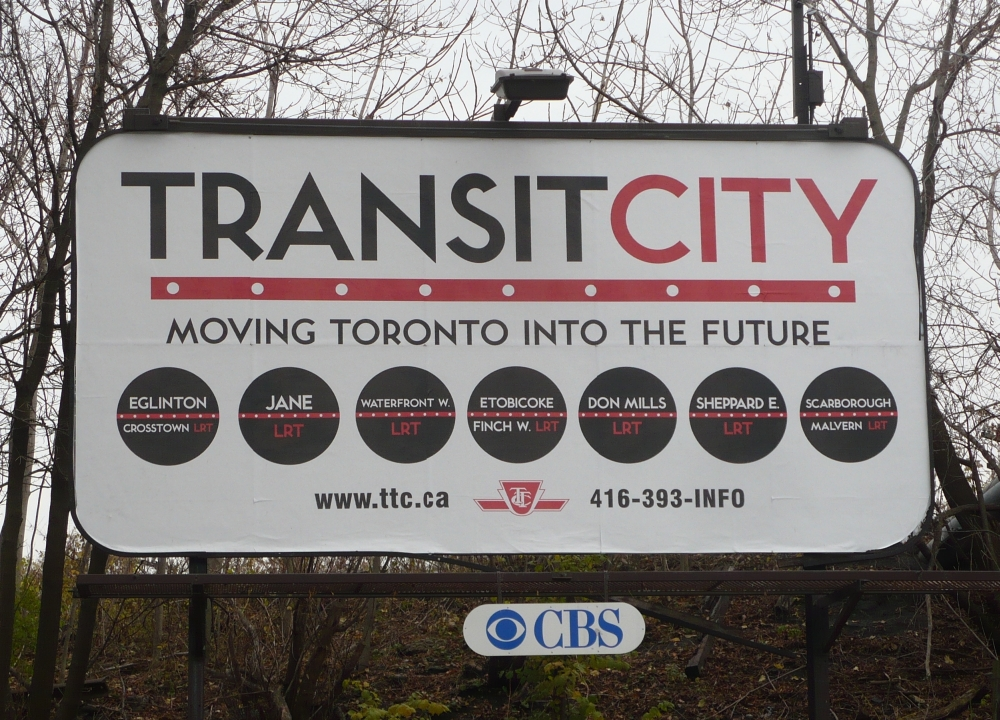
CBS billboard promoting the Transit City project in 2008

Line 5 Eglinton was originally conceived as the Eglinton Crosstown LRT, a partially underground light rail line, announced in 2007 by Toronto mayor David Miller and TTC chair Adam Giambrone. It was part of the Transit City plan, which included the implementation of six other light rail lines across Toronto. The original version of the line would have run from Pearson Airport along Silver Dart Drive to Convair Drive. The line would have then turned southwest to a bridge over Highway 401 to reach Commerce Boulevard on the other side, where it would run south to reach Eglinton Avenue and the east end of the Mississauga Transitway. The rest of the line would run east along Eglinton Avenue, including a portion along which the cancelled Eglinton West subway line would have been built. The line would then traverse the city, connecting with Line 1 Yonge–University, Line 2 Bloor–Danforth, and Line 3 Scarborough.

There were 43 stops planned for the Eglinton Crosstown LRT, 13 of which would be underground. Surface stops would be spaced on average 500 metres (550 yd) apart and the underground stations would be 850 m (930 yd) apart on average, as constructing numerous underground stops would be costly. The average speed would be 28 kilometres per hour (17 mph), compared with the existing bus routes along Eglinton that have an average speed of 16 to 18 km/h (9.9 to 11.2 mph). The line would terminate at Kennedy station to the east in Scarborough where it would meet Line 2 Bloor–Danforth, the proposed Scarborough Malvern LRT and GO Transit's Stouffville line. The expected cost was $4.6 billion. As a result of provincial funding cuts, construction of the line was divided into two phases: phase one would end at Jane Street, and phase two would terminate as had been planned at the Toronto Pearson International Airport.

=== Rob Ford–era redesigns ===
Miller's successor, Rob Ford, announced the cancellation of Transit City on December 1, 2010, the day he took office. He proposed an alternative titled the "Eglinton–Scarborough Crosstown line", which put the 19-kilometre (12 mi) line along Eglinton Avenue completely underground. The line would have then followed the route of Line 3 Scarborough, thus forming a single line continuously from Black Creek Drive to McCowan. The cost would almost double to $8.2 billion and, compared to the original plan, 18 fewer stops were planned, including the elimination of the connection to Pearson Airport. Most of the additional cost would have come from putting 12 additional stations underground and for converting the Scarborough RT.

On February 8, 2012, in a special meeting, Toronto City Council, led by Karen Stintz, voted 25–18 to override Mayor Ford's modifications to the project. The vote reinstated the original proposal to only construct the portion between Laird Drive and Keele Street underground while the remainder of the line is built along the surface. On November 30, 2012, the environmental assessment was revised, such that the east tunnel portal location would be moved from east of Brentcliffe to east of Don Mills; however, this was reversed in May 2013 after receiving community feedback. In January 2013, city councillors from Scarborough put forward an alternative plan to proceed with the construction of the Eglinton Avenue portion of the line as planned but to exclude the Scarborough RT. In July 2013, plans for an "Eglinton-Scarborough Crosstown" line were abandoned, thereby reverting the entire line back to the plan that had been conceived under Transit City.

=== Location of tracks at Leslie Street ===
In 2012, Metrolinx discovered that there would be minimal cost differential between tunnelling under the West Don River at Leslie Street (the proposed location of the Sunnybrook Park stop) versus laying the track on the surface. Metrolinx also stated that tunnelling through that section would have provided "significant improvements to construction staging, schedule and traffic impacts". Thus, in December 2012, Metrolinx proposed an extension of the tunnel and eliminating the planned Sunnybrook Park surface stop. An underground station at Sunnybrook was considered too expensive given low projected ridership. Local residents objected to the elimination of their stop, and by mid-2013, Metrolinx had relented and the surface stop had been restored.

== Construction and implementation ==
Promotional logo of the construction project, incorporating the Toronto Subway typeface

=== Procurement ===
The line was built in two separate phases. To expedite construction, tunnelling took place first, followed by construction of stations, rail and other systems.

==== Tunnelling ====
In July 2010, Metrolinx ordered four tunnel boring machines (TBMs) from Lovat for $54 million. Each TBM was 10 metres (33 ft) long, 6.5 metres (21 ft) in diameter, and weighed 400 tonnes (390 long tons; 440 short tons). The TBMs were named Dennis, Lea, Don, and Humber, after Mount Dennis, Leaside, the Don River, and the Humber River, respectively. The names Dennis and Lea were chosen in reference to Canadian poet Dennis Lee.

In September 2012, Metrolinx awarded a $320-million contract to Crosstown Transit Constructors (a joint venture between Obayashi, Kenny Construction, Kenaidan Contracting and Technicore Underground) to dig a 6.2-kilometre (3.9 mi) tunnel from Black Creek Drive to Yonge Street. In November 2013, Metrolinx awarded a $177-million contract to Aecon and ACS Infrastructure Canada / Dragados to dig a 3.25-kilometre (2.02 mi) tunnel from Brentcliffe Road to Yonge Street.

==== Stations and other infrastructure ====
In January 2013, Infrastructure Ontario issued a request for qualifications (RFQ) to shortlist companies that would design, build, finance and maintain the line as part of a public–private partnership. The contract would include the design, construction and commissioning of:

- 25 new stops and stations
- track, power, signalling and other mechanical and electrical systems
- a vehicle maintenance and storage facility
- a new train storage facility

The contract would also include financing of the project, as well as maintenance of the line for a period of 30 years.

In December 2013, Infrastructure Ontario and Metrolinx released a request for proposals (RFP). Two teams were shortlisted through the RFQ process – Crosslinx Transit Solutions (a consortium including SNC-Lavalin, ACS Infrastructure Canada, EllisDon, Aecon, Dragados and IBI Group) and Crosstown Transit Partners (a consortium including Strabag, Bechtel, Obayashi, Fengate Capital Management and OHL Concesiones). The RFP process closed in February 2015.

In June 2015, Infrastructure Ontario and Metrolinx announced that Crosslinx Transit Solutions had been selected. In November 2015, Ontario Minister of Transportation Steven Del Duca announced that Crosslinx Transit Solutions had been awarded the contract at a cost of $9.1 billion. Del Duca noted this was around $2 billion less than estimated.

At the time of contract award, the 30-year contract to build and maintain the line totalled $9.1 billion, with an opening date of 2021. Capital costs would be $5.3 billion, with each of the 15 underground stations costing $80–100 million to build and the ten street-level stops $3–5 million each. The remainder will be for financing, lifecycle and maintenance costs. Upon completion of the line, its costs had risen to $12.8 billion owing to construction delays and consequences of the COVID-19 pandemic.

=== Construction timeline ===
==== Tunnelling (2010–2015) ====
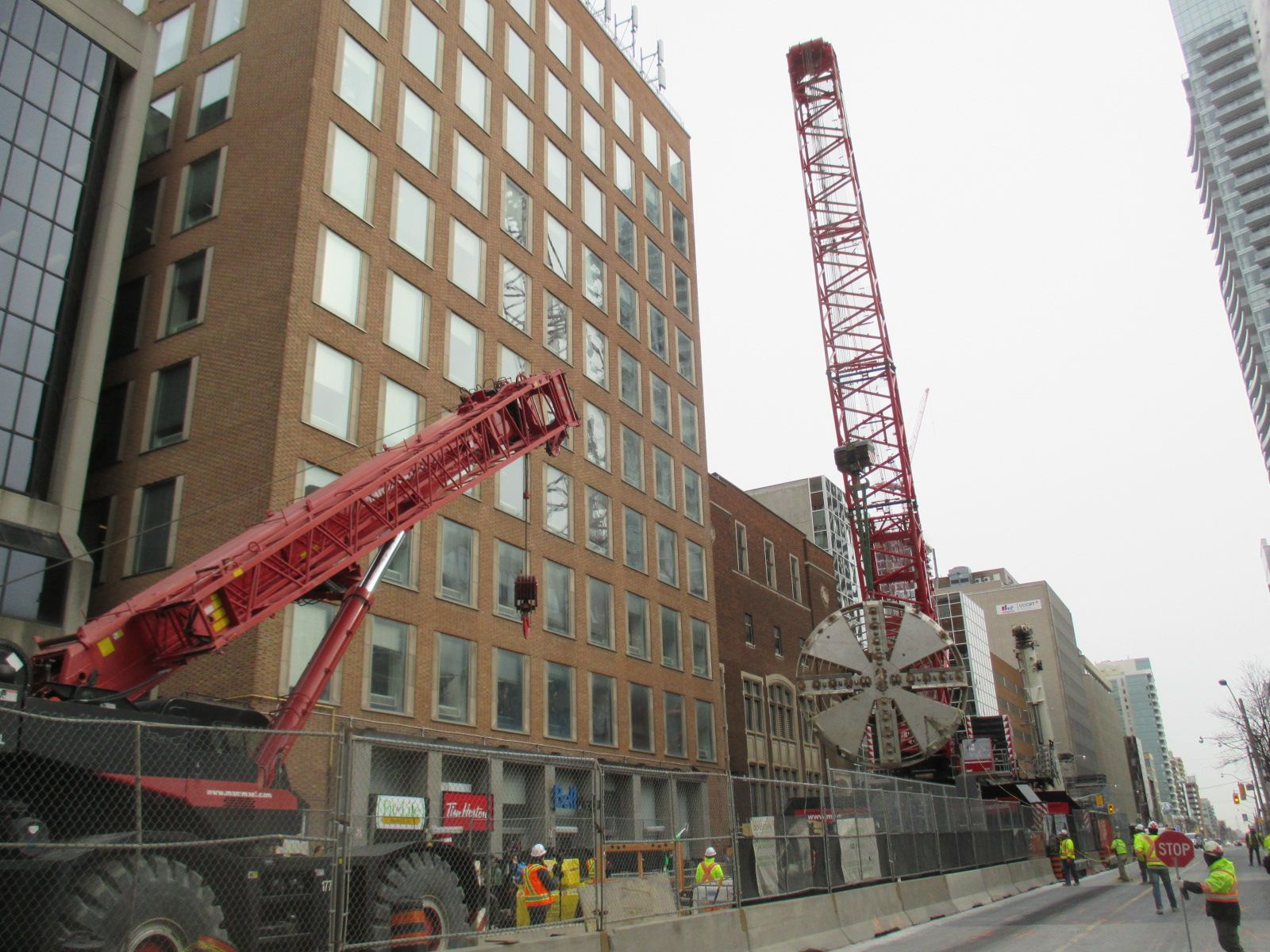
Cutting face of TBM Don being extracted just east of Eglinton station in 2017

In August 2011, preparation for construction of a launch shaft for tunnel boring machines at Black Creek Drive began, while in October of that year, the first part of tunnel construction started. On November 9, 2011, in Keelesdale Park, Mayor Rob Ford and Premier Dalton McGuinty officially broke ground on the new project. In May 2012, the TTC considered that a 2020 opening date was unlikely and that a more realistic in-service date would be between 2022 and 2023. The main reason given was that the project management had been transferred from the TTC to Infrastructure Ontario. A private contractor would complete the project, effectively requiring that contractor to redo all design work already completed by the TTC.

In February 2013, TBMs Dennis and Lea arrived in Keelesdale Park. In June 2013, the TBMs Dennis and Lea began tunnelling on the line. Traffic on Eglinton Avenue near Keele Street was reduced to one lane in each direction.

In March 2014, work began at Brentcliffe Road to set up the eastern launch shaft. By April 2014, the TBMs had arrived at Caledonia station. In April 2014, The Globe and Mail reported that the two western tunnel boring machines were excavating "approximately 1,000 cubic yards [760 m^{3}] of spoil" per day. For the year prior to May 2014, the two TBMs Dennis and Lea had been excavating and installing concrete tunnel liners at a rate of approximately 10 metres (33 ft) per day. The tunnels were lined with precast concrete liner segments. Six 2.5-tonne (2.8-ton) segments form each ring. In early December 2014, Dennis and Lea arrived at Eglinton West station. Dennis stopped to allow Lea to catch up so that they would arrive at Eglinton West station at the same time.

On the weekend of April 18 and 19, 2015, the tunnel boring machines Dennis and Lea were lifted out of a shaft west of Allen Road and moved about 100 metres (330 ft) to a shaft just east of Allen Road. In April 2015, merchants along Eglinton Avenue West were complaining of lost revenue (up to a 35 percent dip in sales), because construction was discouraging customers with snarled traffic, limited parking options, reduced foot traffic and dusty sidewalks. On September 24, 2015, Transportation Minister Steven Del Duca issued a statement saying the Crosstown would not operate until September 2021, in order "to mitigate disruption to the local community and infrastructure as much as possible". The earlier plan had been to open in 2020 with tunnelling and station construction to start in 2012. In September 2015, TBM Don started to bore the north tunnel from the Brentcliffe Road launching site westwards towards Yonge Street. TBM Humber would start boring the south tunnel approximately one month later.

In February 2016, work began on the extraction shaft for TBMs Humber and Don, which bored the eastern segment of the line.

In May 2016, TBMs Dennis and Lea, both of which had been boring the western segment of the line, completed their work by reaching Yonge Street. Dennis and Lea had bored 6.4 kilometres (4.0 mi), installing 25,647 precast concrete tunnel segments to construct the 4,279 rings to line the twin tunnels. In August 2016, TBMs Don and Humber, which had been boring the eastern segment of the line, completed their work by reaching Yonge Street. Don and Humber bored 3.3 kilometres (2.1 mi), installing 26,178 precast concrete tunnel segments to construct the 4,363 rings to line the twin tunnels. The TBMs were then removed in pieces from the extraction shaft on Eglinton Avenue just east of Yonge Street.

In March 2020, Crosslinx began work to extract tunnel boring machines Dennis and Lea at Duplex Avenue, one block west of Yonge Street.

==== Stations, systems and commissioning (2016–2026) ====
===== 2016–2020 =====
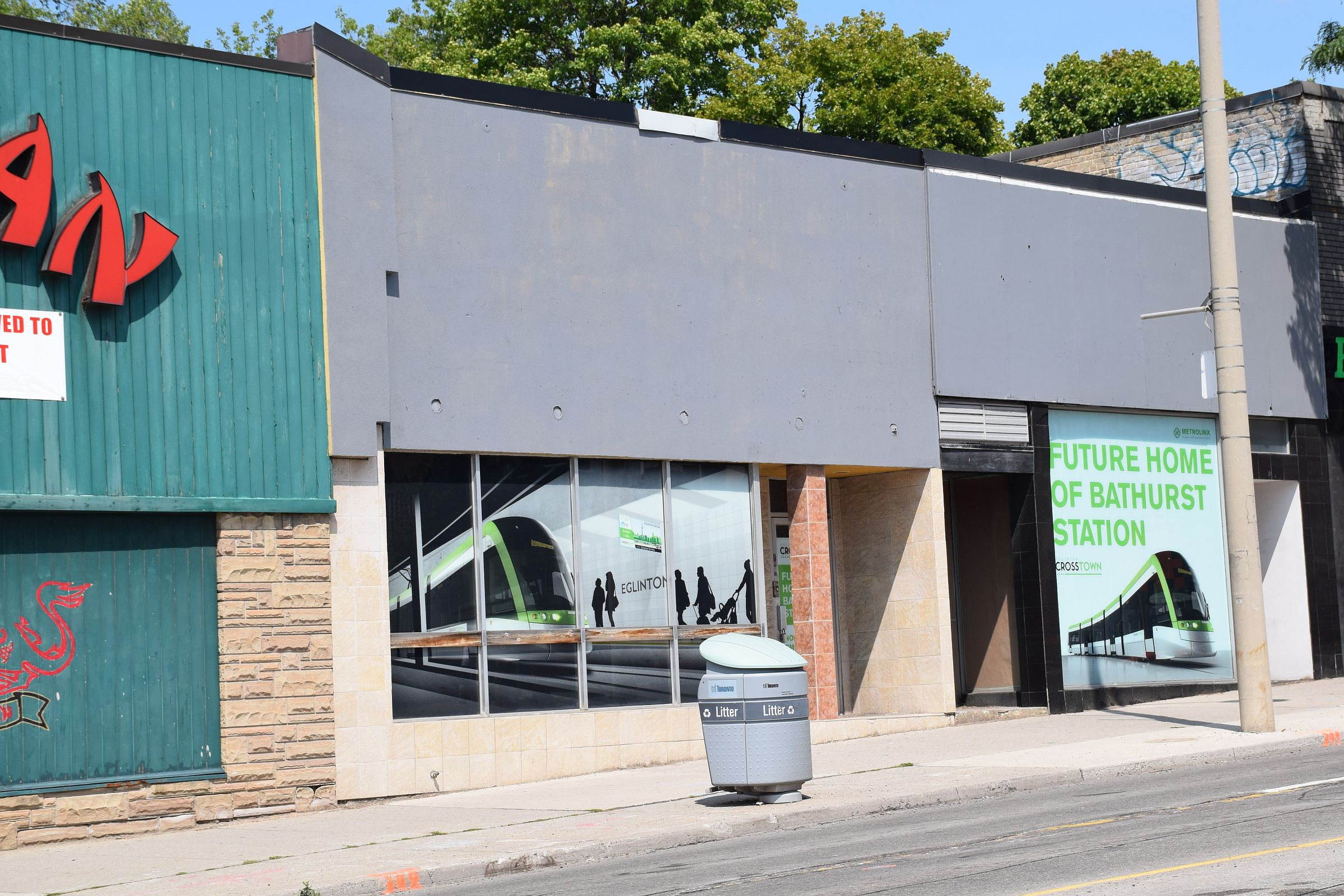
Site of the future Forest Hill station in 2015; the façade of the former House of Chan restaurant unintentionally collapsed, injuring several passersby.

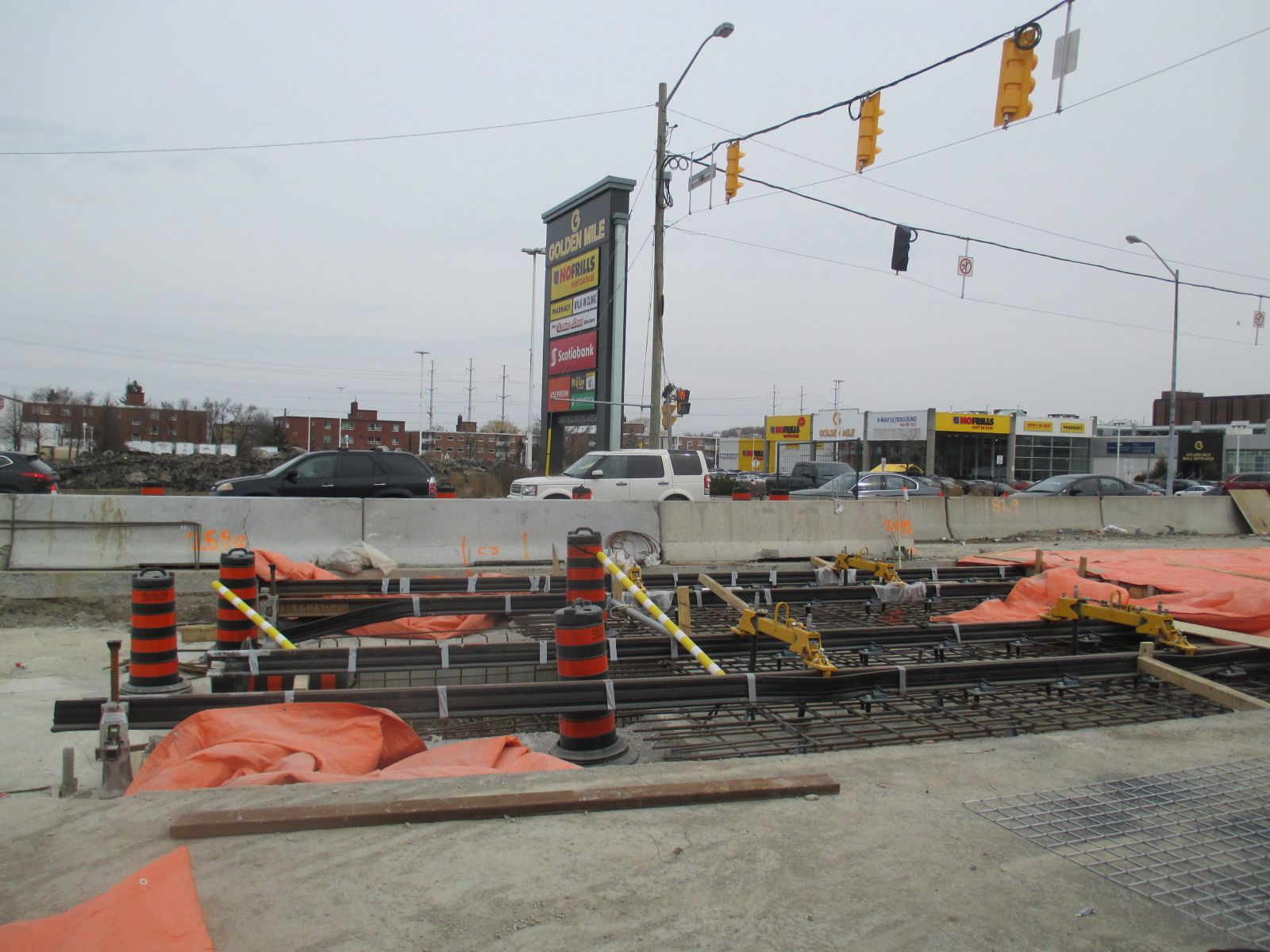
Laying rails at the O'Connor stop in April 2019

On March 10, 2016, Ontario premier Kathleen Wynne and Toronto mayor John Tory attended a ground-breaking ceremony at the site of Keelesdale station, the first station on which construction was to start. The project was slated for completion in 2021.

On April 18, 2016, at the site of the future Forest Hill station, the façade of the former House of Chan restaurant and the scaffolding that was holding it up collapsed, injuring seven people.

In July 2017, construction crews began preparations for constructing the eastern at-grade portion of the line by removing the median in the roadway. A month later, the first section of track was installed at the Eglinton Maintenance and Storage Facility (EMSF). In October 2018, the EMSF was substantially complete. By December 2018, 10 kilometres (6.2 mi) of the 47 kilometres (29 mi) of track had been installed. In January 2019, Bombardier delivered the first Flexity Freedom light rail vehicle (LRV) to the facility, and the first concrete was poured for the surface section at the location of the future O'Connor stop at Victoria Park Avenue.

In November 2019, Crosslinx informed Metrolinx that it did not expect the line to be completed before May 6, 2022, and that the construction costs would total $12.58 billion, an increase of $330 million over previous estimates. The main problems reported were defective caissons (underground watertight compartments) built in the 1950s at Eglinton station, groundwater at the Avenue station site and construction difficulties at the Canadian Pacific Kansas City (CPKC) / Metrolinx bridge adjacent to Mount Dennis station.

In December 2019, track clearance testing using LRVs began between the EMSF and the Western portal. On December 17, Crosslinx conducted an inaugural run with staff and guests from the handover platform at the EMSF to the elevated guideway over Black Creek Drive. At that time, overhead wire had been installed between the EMSF to just short of the Keelesdale platform. By January 2020, Crosslinx had laid 50 percent of the line's track.

The next month, Metrolinx announced that the line would not open until "well into 2022", a delay from the previous target of September 2021. This was despite Metrolinx reaching a settlement with Crosslinx the previous year and paying the consortium $237 million to commit to a September 2021 deadline. Metrolinx cited reasons for the delay: Crosslinx had started work nine months late, and had been slow to finalize some aspects of the design.

In March 2020, the provincial government announced it would provide $3 million in aid to local merchants negatively affected by Crosstown construction near their businesses. The Ministry of Transportation and Metrolinx also announced that they would look into an earlier, partial opening of the line.

The same month, Crosslinx installed the first passenger-waiting shelter on the surface section of the line at the Pharmacy stop. On May 4, 2020, Metrolinx reported the first test trip by a light rail vehicle in a Line 5 tunnel. The trip was from the maintenance and storage facility to just short of the underground Keelesdale station. The test run was to check clearances, trackwork, and overhead power and communications; it involved several movements in and out of the tunnel at speeds of up to 25 km/h (16 mph).

In October 2020, Crosslinx proposed partially opening Line 5 in February 2022, although Eglinton station would not be fully completed until September 2022. Crosslinx said defective infrastructure from 1954 at Eglinton station, difficult hydrogeological conditions and the COVID-19 pandemic had hindered the project. Moody's Investors Service also reported delays at Kennedy, Forest Hill, Mount Pleasant and Cedarvale stations. On October 8, Crosslinx filed a lawsuit against Metrolinx and Infrastructure Ontario, claiming $134 million in unexpected costs due to the pandemic. Metrolinx countered that Crosslinx had been falling behind schedule before the pandemic.

In December 2020, the first pieces of artwork were being installed at Science Centre (later Don Valley) and Mount Dennis stations.

===== 2021 =====
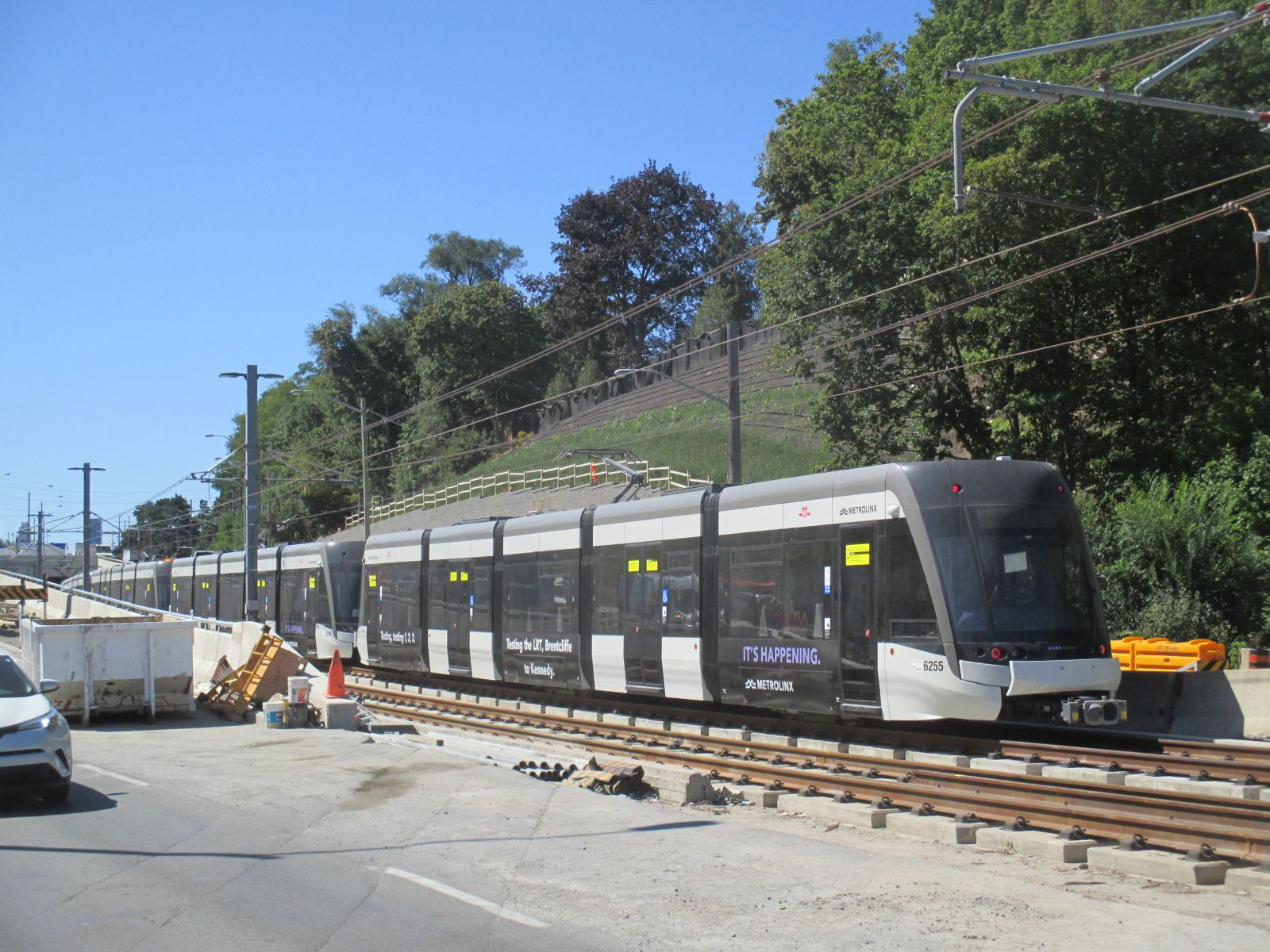
Line 5 LRVs manufactured by Bombardier, used for testing, parked at Brentcliffe portal in September 2021

By April 2021, 85 percent of track had been installed along the entire line. Later that month, the last base-level concrete pour on the line was completed at Eglinton station. That May, Crosslinx energized the overhead catenary system between Laird and Kennedy stations for testing.

On May 17, Crosslinx won a case in Ontario Superior Court against Metrolinx and Infrastructure Ontario to allow compensation for the extra construction costs and project delays due to the pandemic. The court decision allowed Crosslinx to negotiate with the two provincial agencies for financial compensation and a later completion date. (The completion per the contract was to have been September 2021, later revised to 2022 by Metrolinx.) Crosslinx sought approximately $134 million in compensation for extra safety measures, absenteeism and supply-chain problems due to the COVID-19 pandemic.

In the third quarter of 2021, six LRVs were transferred to the eastern end of the line for testing on the surface section east of the Brentcliffe portal. In November, trackage along the line was 100 percent complete, with the last section of track laid at Eglinton station. The same month, the first LRVs were tested along the western underground section to and from the EMSF.

By December, Metrolinx and Infrastructure Ontario had come to a settlement with Crosslinx to pay the consortium an extra $325 million to handle additional costs due the COVID-19 pandemic and due to an unexpected obstruction at Eglinton station that was impeding construction. The line was expected to be substantially complete by September 2022 but possibly not be open until 2023.

===== 2022 =====
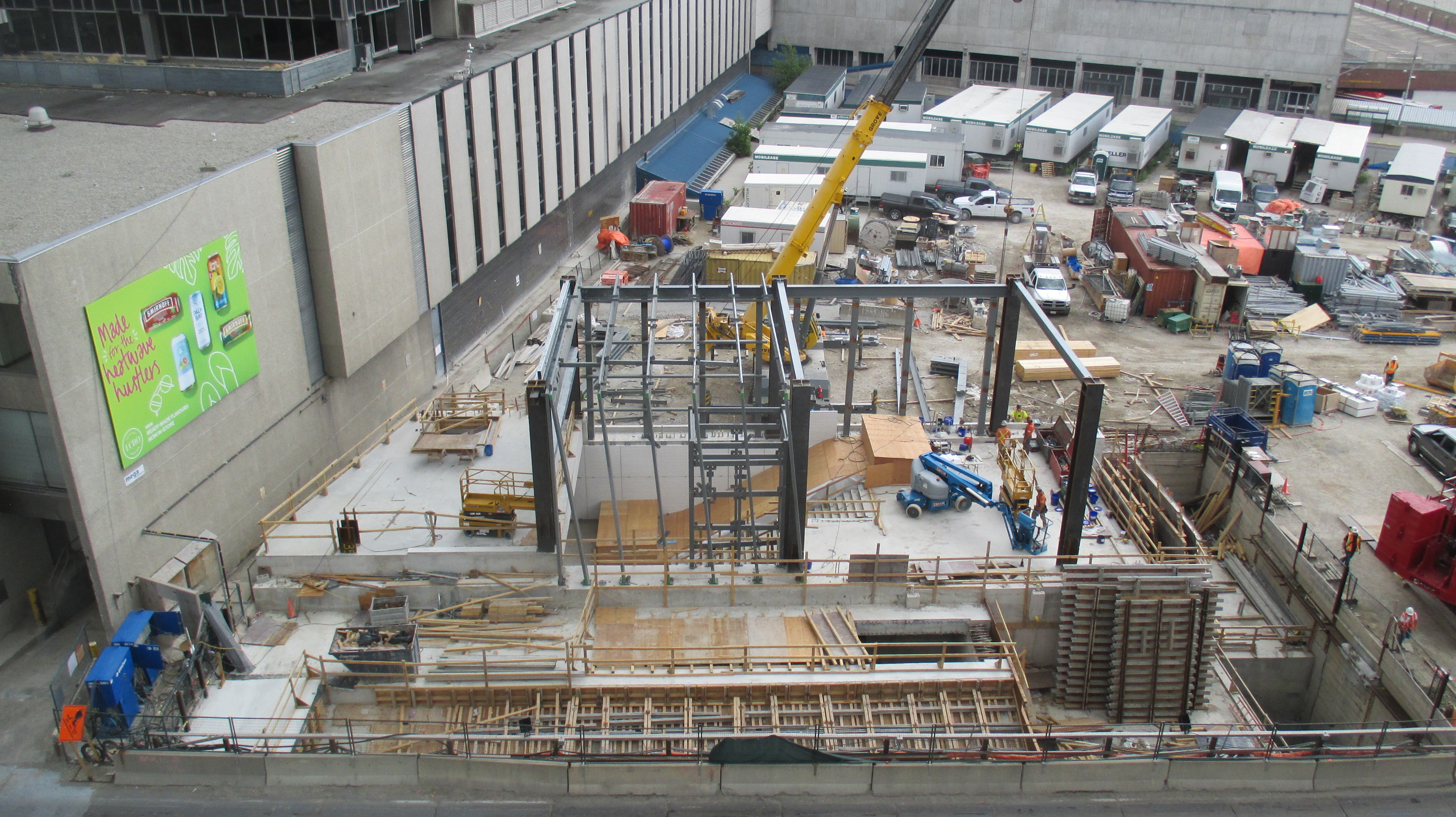
New southwest entrance to Eglinton station under construction in July 2022

By late February 2022, the last signal to control LRT train movements along the line was installed in the tunnel at Laird station.

In March 2022, Metrolinx announced that all 76 of the light rail vehicles had been brought together at the Eglinton Maintenance and Storage Facility, the fleet's final deliveries having arrived in 2021.

In July 2022, Metrolinx started to test three-car trains together with the train control system along the line. Three cars is the maximum train length for the line and can carry up to 490 passengers.

In late September 2022, Metrolinx announced that Crosslinx was behind schedule and thus Line 5 would not be completed by year-end as had been previously expected. Metrolinx did not provide a revised completion date. However, CBC Toronto cited an unnamed source with knowledge of the project who stated that Line 5 would likely be delayed a year, until September 2023. The completion of underground stations was behind schedule, particularly at Eglinton station where tunnelling under Line 1 was difficult.

According to an internal Metrolinx report from September 2022, Crosslinx had expected to complete the project by March 2023, but Metrolinx felt that date to be unrealistic. Metrolinx blamed Crosslinx and old infrastructure at Eglinton station for project delays. Metrolinx also had complaints about deficiencies in work completed. Crosslinx had over $260 million in outstanding claims against Metrolinx.

In December, CBC Toronto obtained confidential documents from Metrolinx which indicated that the company did not believe Crosslinx had a "credible plan" to complete the line. The records stated that 98 percent of construction and engineering work was completed at the time of their writing, while only 79 percent of track and train testing had been completed.

===== 2023 =====
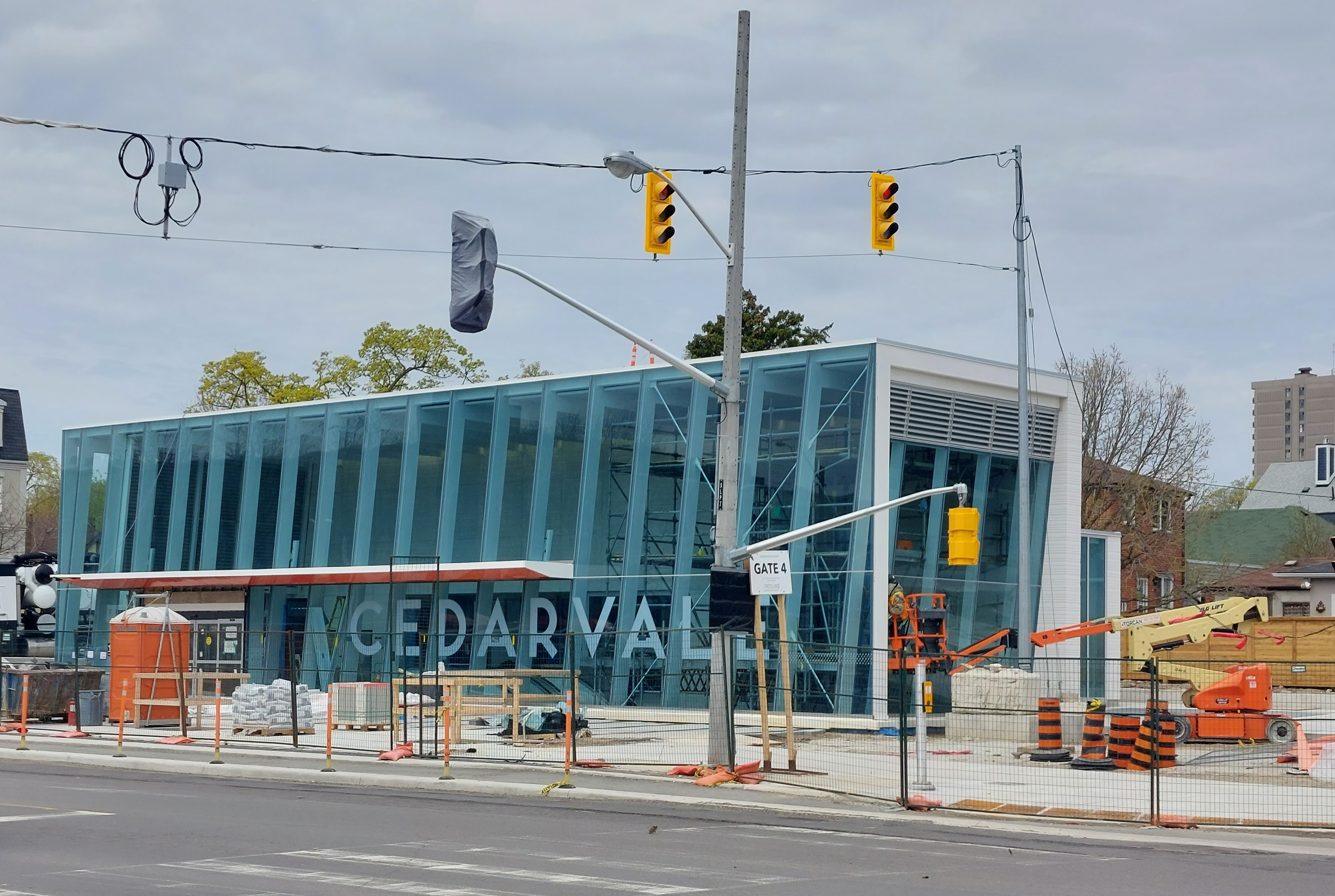
By 2023, the bulk of major construction had been completed as seen with Cedarvale station

In February 2023, Crosslinx reported it had made good progress at Eglinton station, but some utility and road restoration work still needed to be done. By April 2023, Metrolinx had not given a project status update to the public since September 2022. Documents obtained by the Toronto Star indicated the silence from Metrolinx was at the direction of the provincial government.

In late April 2023, construction crews started to remove the platform at the Sloane stop due to uneven concrete, which was causing water to pool on the platform. Replacement of the platform (built in 2020) would take one month of work, and Metrolinx said that Crosslinx would be responsible for the cost.

On April 26, 2023, Brian Lilley of the Toronto Sun cited unnamed sources in government and industry who indicated that Line 5 would not open until 2024 at the earliest. A day later, Metrolinx CEO Phil Verster gave a status report but gave no completion date. The project had 260 non-conformance issues for Crosslinx to fix. The major problem identified was improperly laid tracks in tunnels that might be only a few millimetres out of gauge but could result in a derailment. Testing was only 50 percent complete. Training of TTC staff to operate the line would not start until the line was fully ready.

On May 14, 2023, the TTC opened the northern platform extension at Eglinton station along Line 1 Yonge–University so that Line 1 trains stop 24 metres (79 ft) further north. Upon Line 5's opening, the northern extension would offer riders a more convenient transfer between trains on Lines 1 and 5. The southern end of the original platform is closed off from trains but is still publicly accessible from the centre of the island platform to allow for access to the elevator.

In May 2023, Metrolinx announced that Crosslinx intended to sue the provincial agency and also to cease working with the TTC on the project. Crosslinx claimed that changes requested by the TTC were creating project delays and extra costs and that this resulted from a lack of a signed operating agreement between Metrolinx and the TTC. Crosslinx wanted the courts to remove its obligation to work on the project while issues with Metrolinx and the TTC remained unresolved. On the same day, Verster confirmed the line would not open until sometime in 2024.

In the fourth quarter of 2023, Verster announced he would not give an estimated opening date for Line 5 until after "high-risk testing and commissioning work [was] completed" and that the date would be announced three months before opening. As of September 2023, there were about 200 unresolved defects on the project. Crosslinx president Bill Gifford said a key piece of work could not be done in the winter months.

By December 2023, 15.3 percent of the integration testing had been completed. Ten test trains were operating along the line, but testing would require increased train frequencies of three to five minutes. Training of TTC operators was 12 percent complete. In December 2023, for budget purposes, the TTC made the assumption that Line 5 would open no earlier than September 2024.

===== 2024 =====
In March 2024, Metrolinx CEO Phil Verster stated that all major construction had been completed but that the most serious obstacle remaining was defects in software for the signalling and train control system. The software defects were corrected with the sixth version of the software tested in April and May 2024.

A Metrolinx report dated June 27, 2024, indicated that construction had been completed for 14 of the 15 stations along the line. Eglinton station was the only station where work was outstanding due to its complexity. By June 2024, 17 TTC staff had been trained as instructors. It was planned they would, in turn, train 110 operators.

By early October 2024, Metrolinx stated that Line 5 would not open in 2024, but that it would give three months notice of its opening. On December 4, 2024, Councillor Jamaal Myers, chairman of the TTC board, stated that the TTC did not expect Line 5 to open before June 1, 2025, at the earliest. Myers also said he had no confirmation from Metrolinx as to whether that date was realistic. As of December 2024, training of TTC operators had not been completed, and a 30-day test period of non-revenue service had not started.

===== 2025 =====
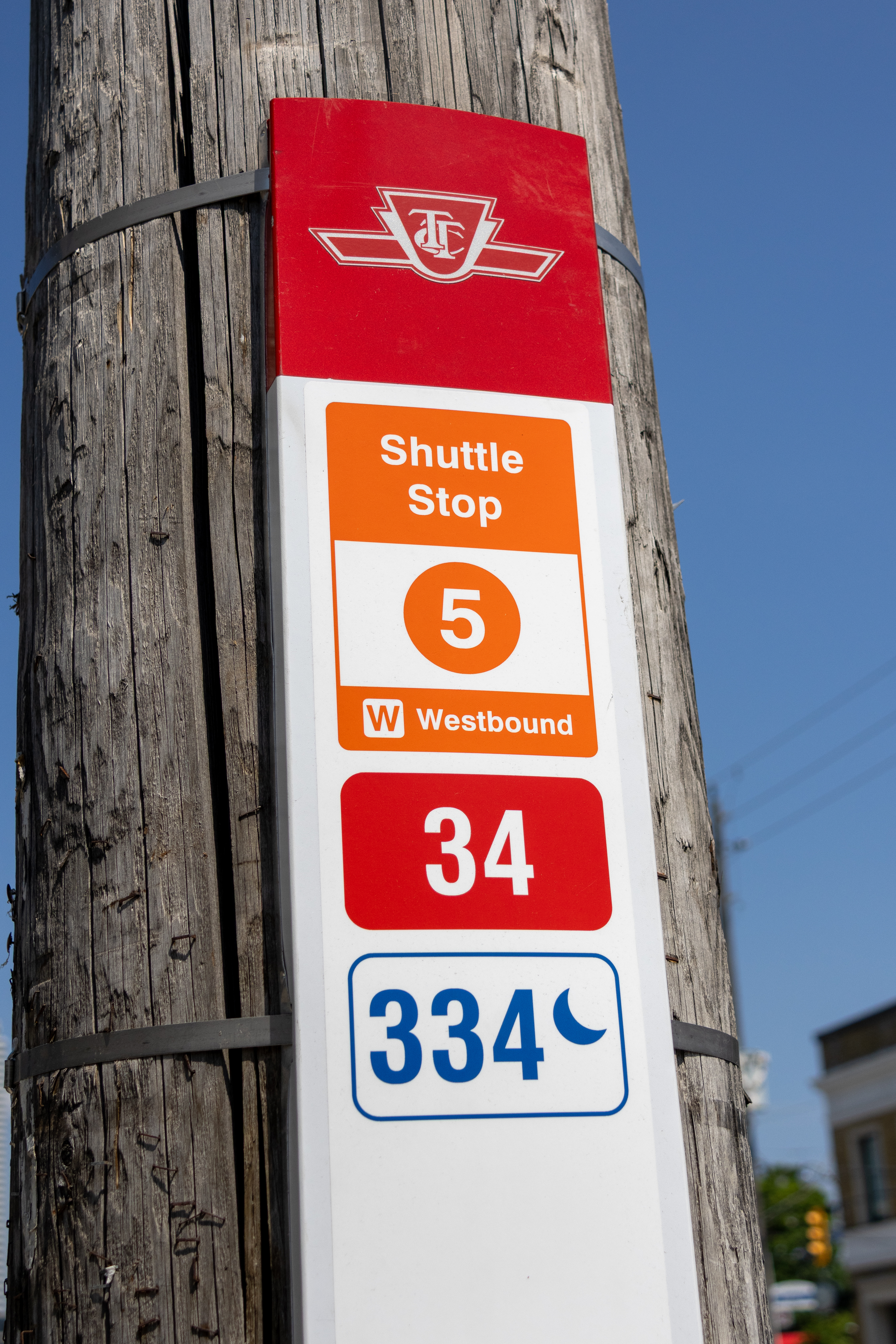
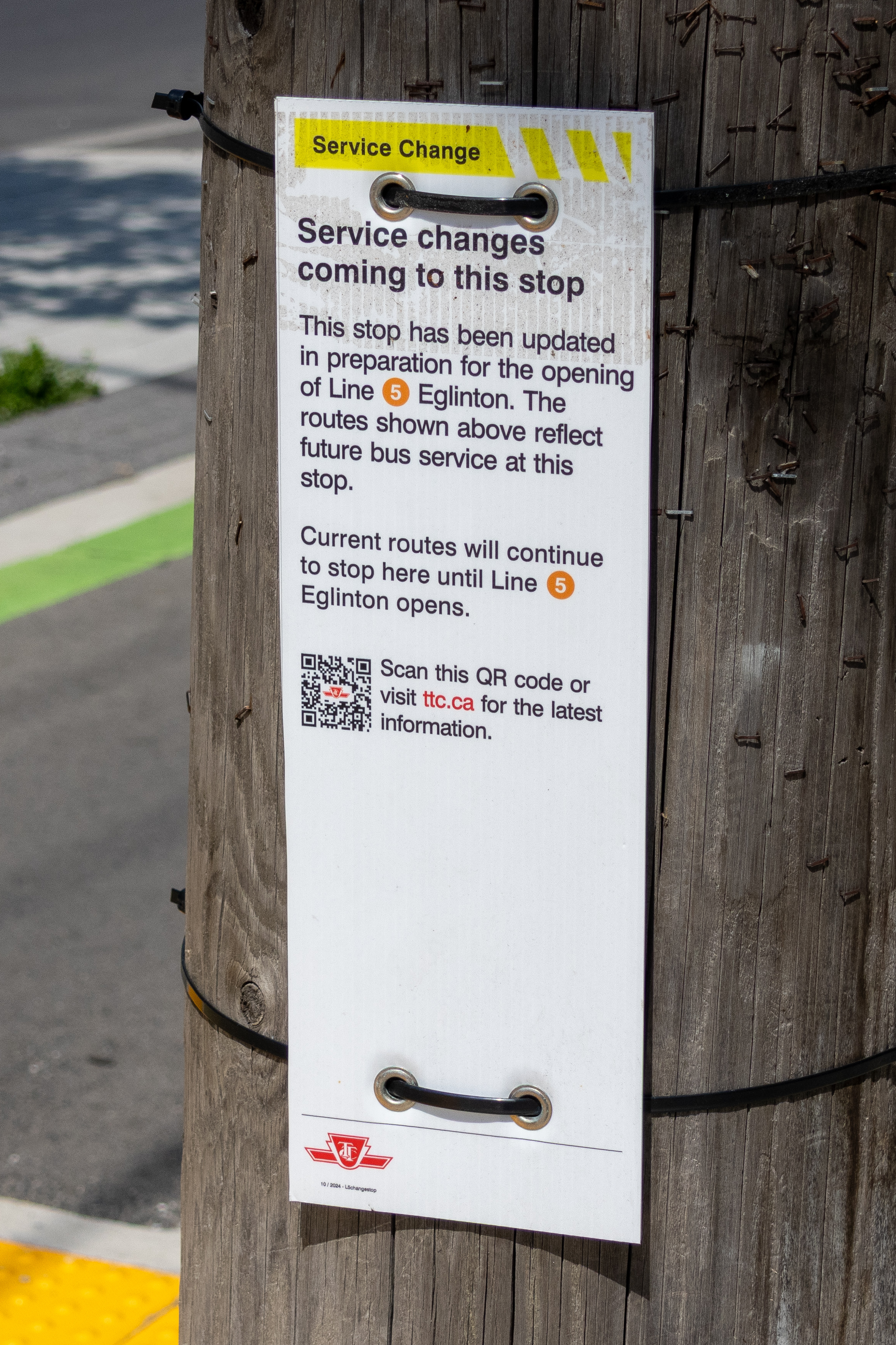
TTC bus stop in June 2025 on Eglinton Avenue showing service changes for when Line 5 opens

In March 2025, two anonymous sources told the Toronto Star that the line was expected at the time to open in September 2025. One remarked upon the possibility of "an eleventh-hour problem" due to Metrolinx's lack of transparency regarding the construction and testing of the project. In June 2025, Premier Ford stated he had confidence in a September 2025 start of operations.

On March 28, 2025, Metrolinx announced that, due to the permanent closure of the Ontario Science Centre's original Don Mills site a year prior, Science Centre station would be renamed. Don Valley was chosen to reflect the station's proximity to the Don Valley Parkway, the Don River, and the Don Valley itself.

In mid-June 2025, Metrolinx handed over the operation of Line 5 to the TTC. By this time, all TTC vehicle operators had been trained, although stress testing continued. In July 2025, the TTC noted that the September opening was unlikely but that opening in the fourth quarter of 2025 was "plausible" and that the line would be open by the end of the year.

At the beginning of August 2025, Michael Lindsay, the CEO of Metrolinx, announced that during stress testing, the Flexity Freedom LRVs had issues with "availability and reliability" due to them lying unused for ten years. Metrolinx needed to establish a "maintenance profile" for the vehicles. After addressing these issues, Metrolinx started a "revenue demonstration" on October 7, where trains would run on a full schedule without passengers for at least 30 days. Metrolinx indicated it would require three weeks of problem-free running before opening the line for passenger service.

On December 2, 2025, a 30-day trial of the line was successfully completed. As a result, Metrolinx began the approximately two-week process of turning over the line to the TTC, which would then in turn set an opening date. On December 5, 2025, the Ontario government announced that the project had been substantially completed.

On December 16, 2025, city council approved a motion by Mayor Olivia Chow to have the city manager coordinate with the TTC and Metrolinx about implementing better signal priority on the surface portion of Line 5. This was to avoid the implementation problems that resulted in excessively long run times on Line 6 Finch West during its first week of operation.

==== 2026 ====
In January 2026, the random activation of emergency brakes on trains gave the TTC cause for concern as a critical safety issue. Multiple braking errors occurred on January 7, but only four more occurred during the remainder of the month. With emergency braking, there is no jolting stop but rather a gradual deceleration. Metrolinx believed the problem was not serious enough to delay opening the line, but the TTC insisted on a satisfactory explanation of the problem from Metrolinx.

== Opening ==
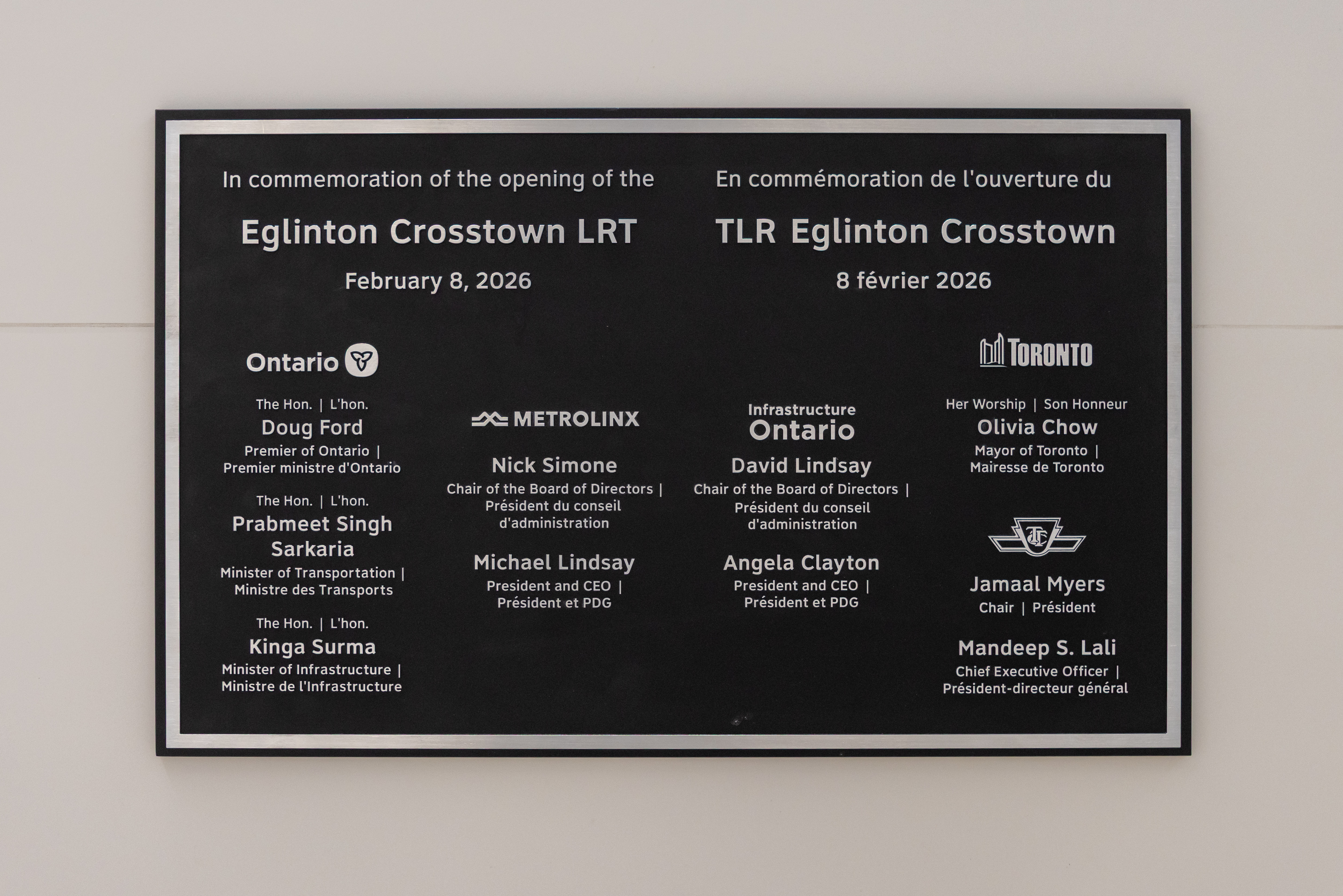
Plaque commemorating the opening of Line 5 at Eglinton station

A phased opening began on February 8, 2026. A phased opening of the line was decided upon following the recommendations from a public inquiry into the launch of the Confederation Line of Ottawa's O-Train system. From the start of the phased opening, the TTC was making service adjustments to fine-tune operations, and Line 5 service was ending early at 11 p.m.

Speed in the tunnel was limited to 60 km/h (37 mph), and the end-to-end run time was 50 to 55 minutes versus 105 minutes for buses. Giving Line 5 trains priority over left-turning road traffic was to be implemented later. When full service begins, trains will operate to 1 a.m. the next calendar day, and the tunnel speed will be raised to a maximum of 80 km/h (50 mph).

By mid-March 2026, the city had made changes to traffic light signals at nine intersections between Kennedy and Don Valley stations to give Line 5 trains priority over left-turning road traffic. Priority at Leslie Street would be deferred for further testing. The TTC indicated further enhancements would follow.

Starting April 5, 2026, Line 5 trains ran until 1:20 a.m. the next calendar day (until 12:30 a.m. Saturdays), eliminating late-evening replacement buses. Service frequency was every four minutes in peak periods and every six to ten minutes in the off-hours. In future phases, there would be additional trains, better trip time reliability and completion of signal priority.

== Route description ==
Schematic map of Line 5 Eglinton (orange; with thin line representing street-running sections), including the under-construction Eglinton Crosstown west extension to Renforth (dark orange). Also shown are portions of the future Scarborough subway extension (dark green) north and east of Kennedy, and the Ontario Line (blue).

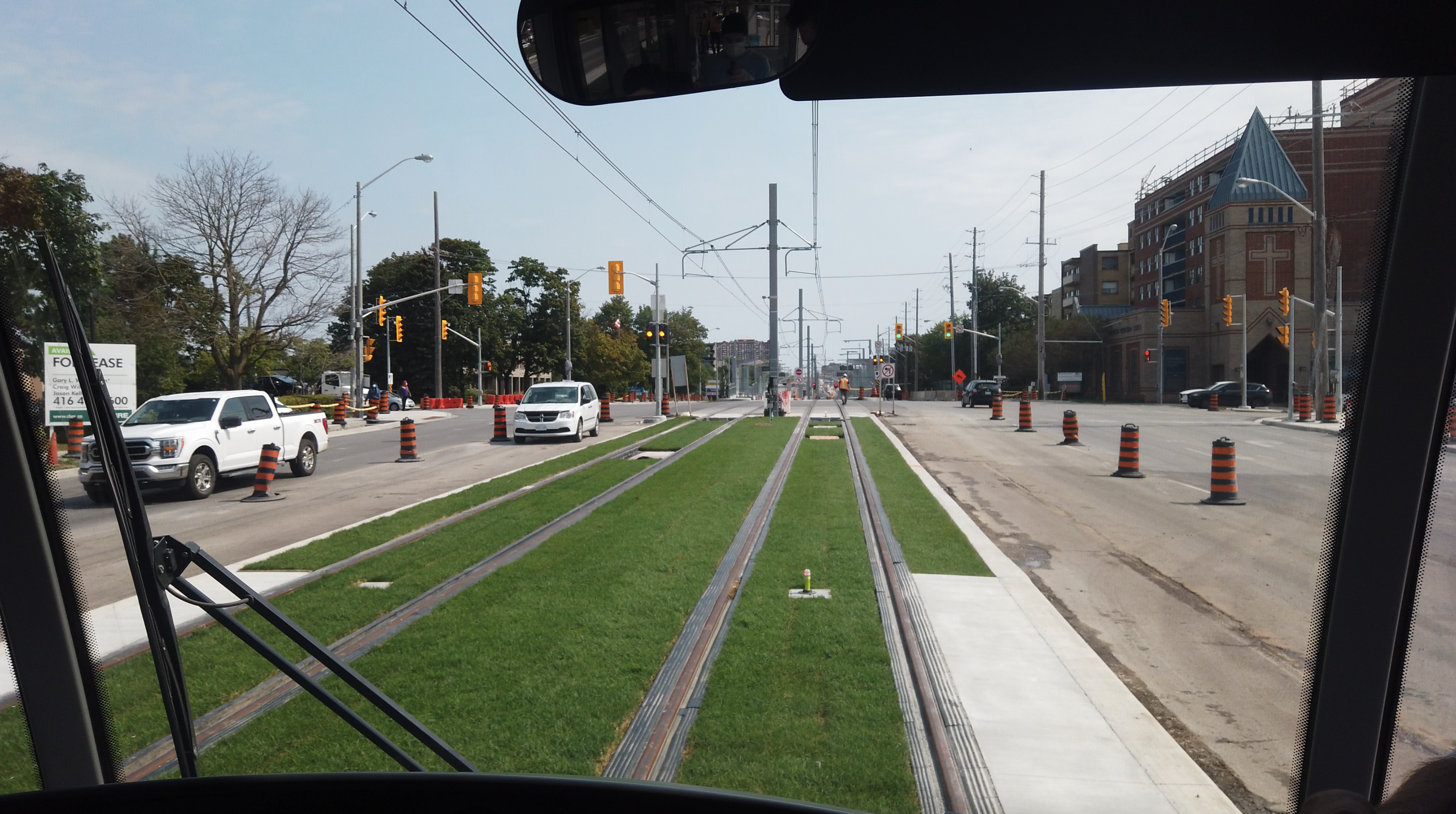
View of a green track segment from a Line 5 train at Birchmount Road

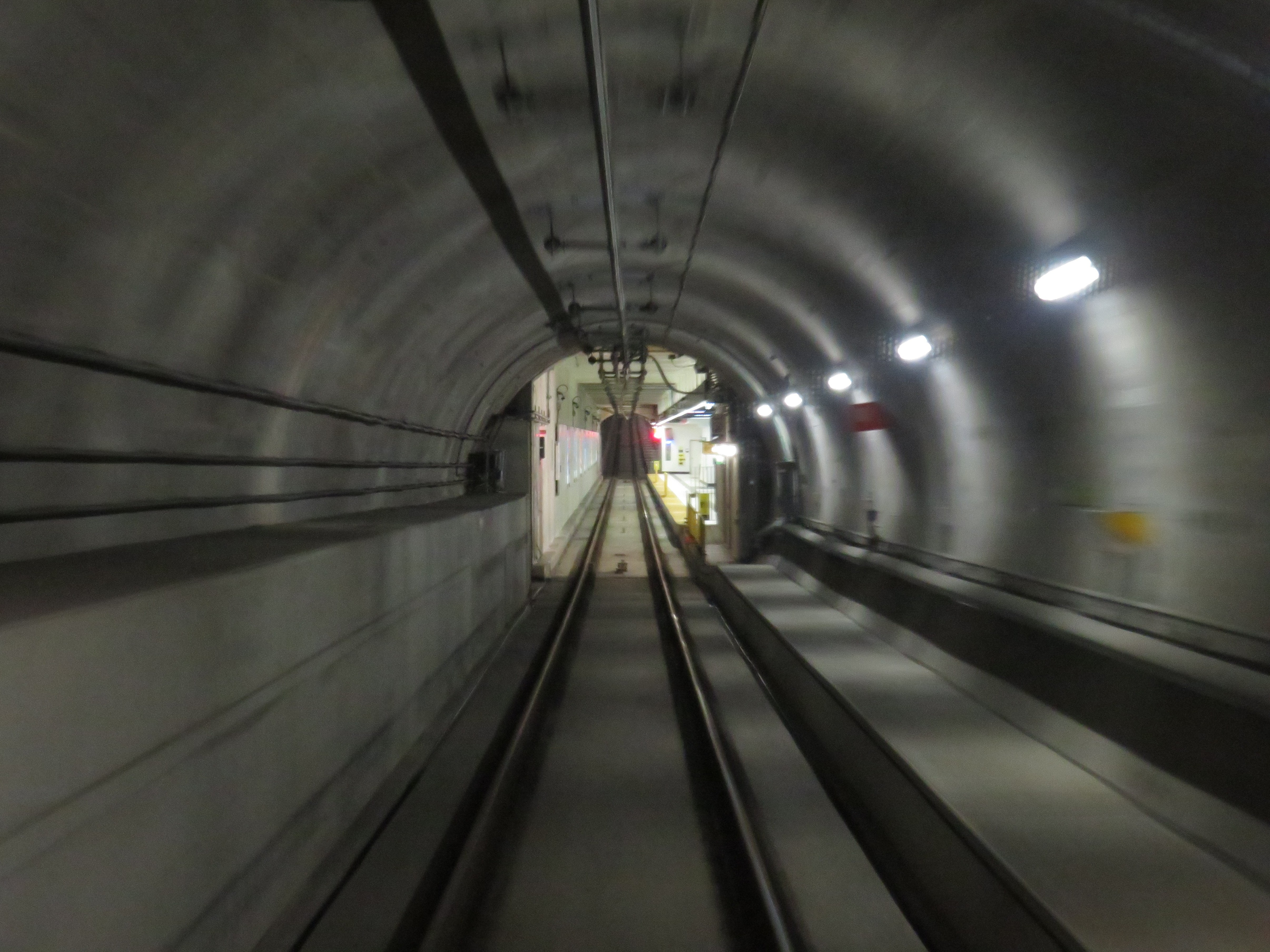
View of tunnelled segment from a Line 5 train departing Keelesdale station

Line 5 Eglinton begins at the surface Mount Dennis station and heads east, immediately crossing a wye to the Eglinton Maintenance and Storage Facility to the north. After passing over Black Creek Drive, it enters a tunnel portal to begin its approximately 10 km (6.2 mi) underground run. At Cedarvale station, it interchanges with the western branch of Line 1 Yonge–University, and then passes a diamond crossover just east of the platform. Immediately east of Avenue station, it enters a large-diameter tunnel section containing both service tracks and a third centre track used to store trains. It interchanges with the eastern branch of Line 1 at Eglinton station (located at Yonge Street), and traverses another crossover. The easternmost underground station, Laird, hosts both a crossover and a centre track, both housed within single tunnels to the west and east respectively.

The line then rises to the surface at a tunnel portal at Brentliffe Road to begin its run along the median of Eglinton Avenue and uses "green track", which is track with vegetation growing beside and between the rails, with paved gaps at intersections and stops. It soon reaches the first on-street surface stop, Sunnybrook Park, at Leslie Street, next to the overpass for the CPKC Belleville Subdivision. Approaching Don Mills Road, it dives underground and arrives at Don Valley station, an underground through-station within the surface section. East of Don Valley, it rises to the surface for another 6 km (3.7 mi), serving nine more surface stops, with several crossovers in between along this section, and a centre track at Sloane. The line returns underground at its eastern terminus at Kennedy station, which provides connections with Line 2 Bloor–Danforth (which also has Kennedy as its eastern terminus) and GO Transit's Stouffville line.

=== Design ===
The underground sections consist mostly of twin tunnels bored with TBMs and stations built using the cut-and-cover method. However, Avenue, Laird, and Oakwood stations were constructed using the sequential excavation method (SEM). The mined caverns at Avenue and Laird both contain their train platforms and their aforementioned adjacent special trackwork in single semicircular tubes. According to Crosslinx, SEM is more common in Europe and Line 5 was the first project to use the technique in Toronto.

On-street stops are located at signalized intersections and have platforms with level boarding, barriers along the street to protect waiting passengers, Presto machines, screens displaying the next vehicle arrival time and advertising, platform illumination, and covered glass waiting shelters with benches and an assistance intercom for passenger security.

Each section of green track has irrigation chambers, a water supply, and a power source for the irrigation system. Green track dampens train sounds, absorbs runoff water, reduces ambient temperatures in summer, and minimizes the spread of dust.

Pattison Outdoor Advertising is responsible for advertising within the grade-separated stations, while Bell Media via Astral Media is responsible for advertising for the on-street stops.

=== Stations and stops ===
Station/stop	Type	Notes	Connections
Mount Dennis	Surface	Located east of Weston Road in Mount Dennis	Kitchener line, Union Pearson Express
Keelesdale	Underground	Located at Keele Street in Keelesdale	
Caledonia	Underground		Future connection to Barrie line Indirect connection to Beltline Trail
Fairbank	Underground	Located at Dufferin Street in Fairbank	
Oakwood	Underground		
Cedarvale	Underground	Located at Allen Road in Humewood–Cedarvale; Named Eglinton West until 2025; opened as a Line 1 station in 1978.	Yonge–University
Forest Hill	Underground	Located at Bathurst Street in Forest Hill	
Chaplin	Underground		Indirect connection to Beltline Trail
Avenue	Underground		
Eglinton	Underground	Located at Yonge Street in Yonge–Eglinton; Opened as original northern terminus station of Line 1 in 1954	Yonge–University
Mount Pleasant	Underground		
Leaside	Underground	Located at Bayview Avenue in Leaside	
Laird	Underground		
Sunnybrook Park	On-street	Side platforms at Leslie Street near Sunnybrook Park	
Don Valley	Underground	Located at Don Mills Road; Renamed from Science Centre prior to opening	Future connection to Ontario Line
Aga Khan Park & Museum	On-street	Side platforms on the west side of the Don Valley Parkway, near Aga Khan Park	
Wynford	On-street	Side platforms just west of the bridge over Wynford Drive	
Sloane	On-street	Centre platform located east of Sloane Avenue and Bermondsey Road	
O'Connor	On-street	Side platforms between Victoria Park Avenue and O'Connor Drive	
Pharmacy	On-street	Side platforms	
Hakimi Lebovic	On-street	Far-side platforms	
Golden Mile	On-street	Far-side platforms located at Warden Avenue in Golden Mile	
Birchmount	On-street	Side platforms	
Ionview	On-street	Side platforms	
Kennedy	Underground		Bloor–Danforth; Stouffville line

==== Station names ====
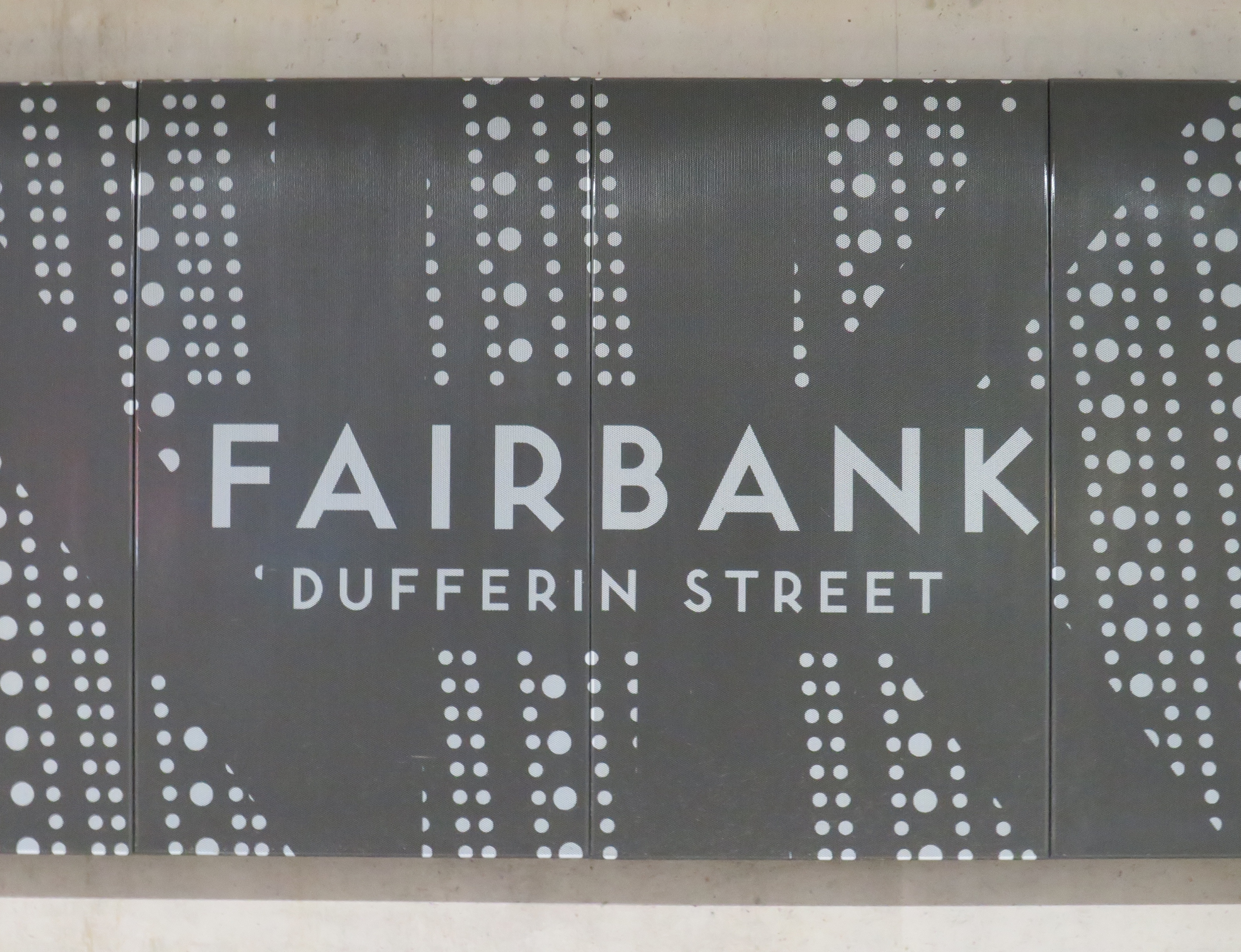
Fairbank station platform name signage with Dufferin Street as a subtitle

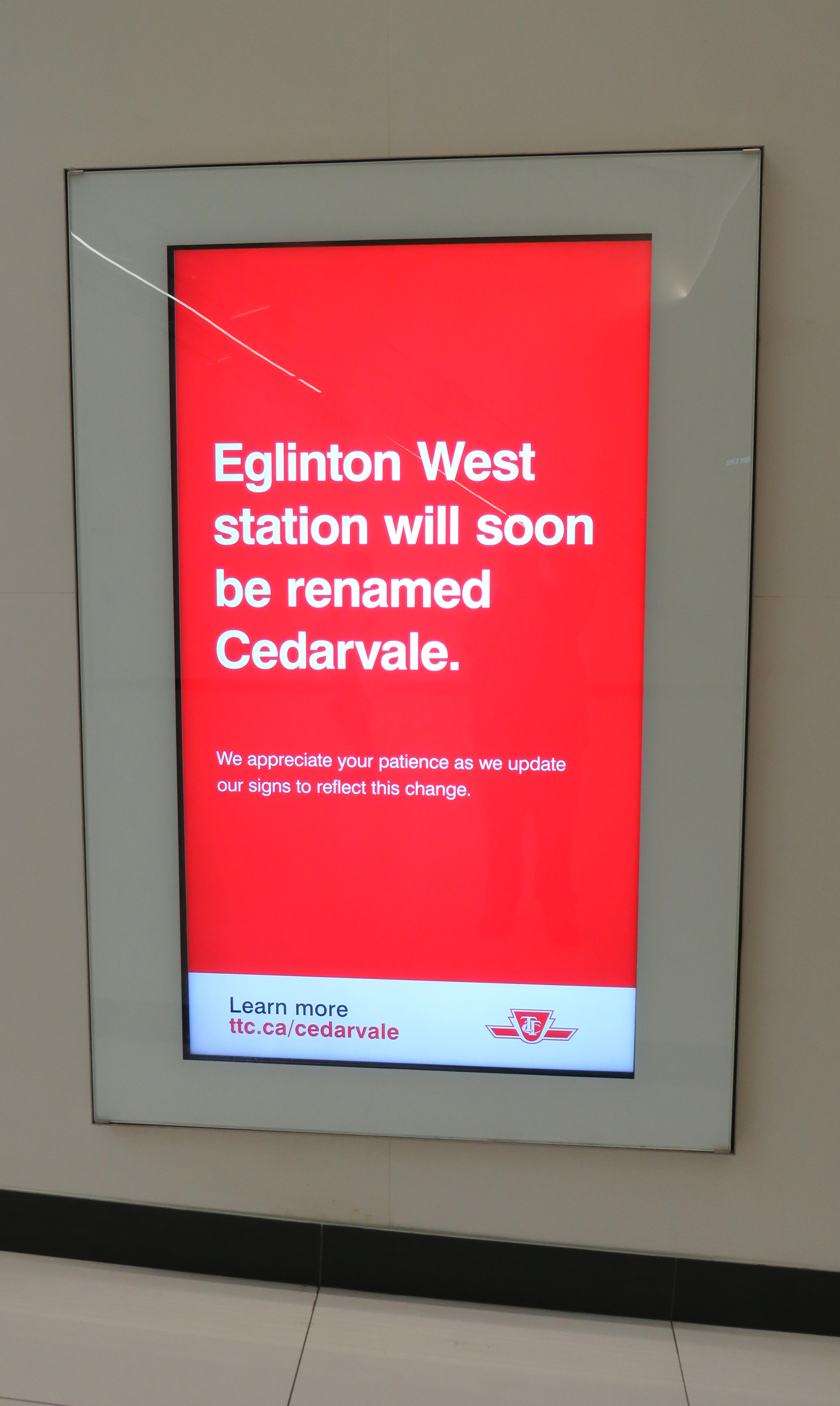
Sign at Eglinton West station in November 2025 advising of its name change to Cedarvale

During the early planning stages of Line 5 Eglinton, numerous stations and stops received temporary working names that closely resembled or duplicated those of existing Toronto subway and GO Transit stations. To prevent confusion among passengers, a report presented to the TTC board in November 2015 recommended giving unique names to all stations within the system, including those on Line 5. Thus, the stations and even on-street stops with non-unique working names were given permanent names that mostly reflected the surrounding neighbourhoods: for instance, the stations at Weston Road and Dufferin Street were given the names Mount Dennis and Fairbank respectively, and the stop at Warden Avenue was named Golden Mile.

The working names of some on-street stops were not used as final names even though they did not conflict with existing station names. The Aga Khan Park & Museum stop was given the working name Ferrand after the nearby Ferrand Drive, and Sloane had the working name Bermondsey.

Initially, the stop at Hakimi Avenue and Lebovic Road had the working name Lebovic. Metrolinx renamed it Hakimi after the TTC noted that Hakimi Avenue offered access to prominent local landmarks, such as Centennial College's Ashtonbee Campus. Ultimately, the stop was named Hakimi Lebovic after both streets.

To avoid confusion with Eglinton station, Eglinton West station was renamed Cedarvale in 2025.

Following the permanent closure of the original Ontario Science Centre location near Don Mills and Eglinton in June 2024, it was decided to rename the unopened Science Centre station. The name Don Valley was chosen in March 2025.

All the line's grade-separated stations are subtitled with the cross street under the station name on the platform walls, even if they are actually named after said streets (e.g. Fairbank–Dufferin Street and Oakwood–Oakwood Avenue).

As of 2026, alternate names for stations along the under-construction western extension at cross streets (Kipling Avenue, Islington Avenue, Royal York Road, Jane Street, and Martin Grove Road) that conflict with the names of existing stations or stops on Line 2 Bloor–Danforth and Line 6 Finch West have not been announced.

== Architecture and public art ==
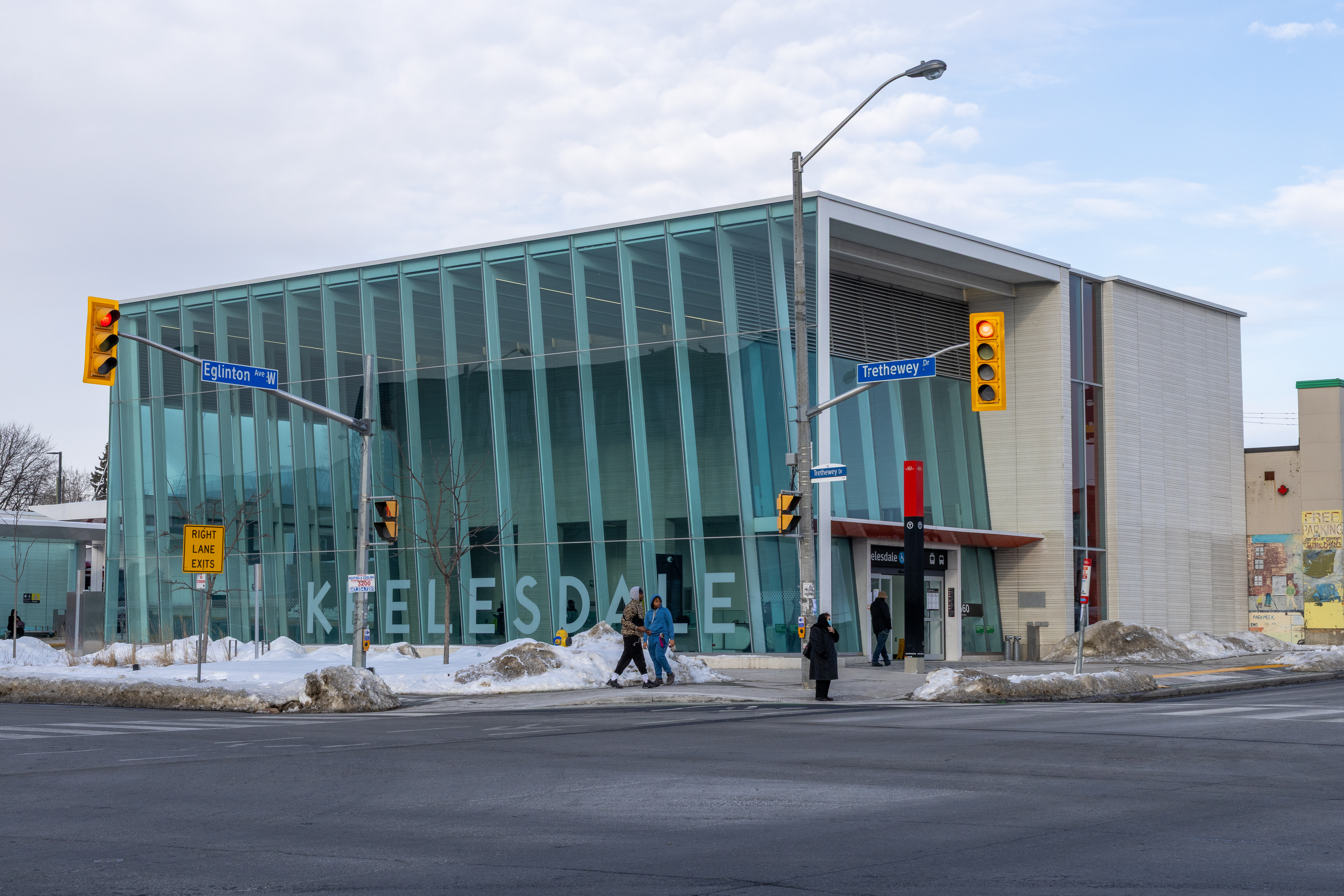
Station architecture at Keelesdale station

=== Architecture ===
The architectural concept for the line was designed by architects gh3* from Toronto and Daoust Lestage Lizotte Stecker from Montreal. Specific stations were then designed by Arcadis, Dialog and NORR, with surface stops designed by Arcadis. Beth Kapusta, the former head of design excellence at Metrolinx, described the theme of the line as "simple, light-filled boxes", and that it would be a "strong, coherent system of clarity and simplicity".

Architectural features of station buildings include natural light from large windows and skylights, steel structures painted white, and orange accents (the colour of the line). The Toronto Subway typeface is used both on supergraphics (station names screen-printed onto glass at street level) as well as on platform wall signage. The entrances to Chaplin, Keelesdale, and Fairbank station are set in landscaped plazas with planting and seating.

The design of each station is similar, with all having island platforms with white structural elements and white concourse levels that follow the theme of Metrolinx's GO stations. The station names are emblazoned on the platform walls along wide strips coloured either black, grey, or orange and placed over unadorned concrete that displays them in a standard size over a pattern of vertical white dots, which is broken by the names in larger-size block letters extending the full height of the strips.

Reviewing the line, Alex Bozikovic, the architecture critic of The Globe and Mail, stated that the line was, "in architectural terms, a modest success despite its troubled beginnings", with Azure magazine calling the design "sensitive and streamlined".

Two heritage buildings were reused as part of the line – the main entrance at Mount Pleasant station uses the façade of a former branch of the Imperial Bank of Canada (later CIBC) in a building originally designed by architect Herbert Horner in 1928, and Mount Dennis station uses Kodak Building 9 (a former industrial building) as the station building.

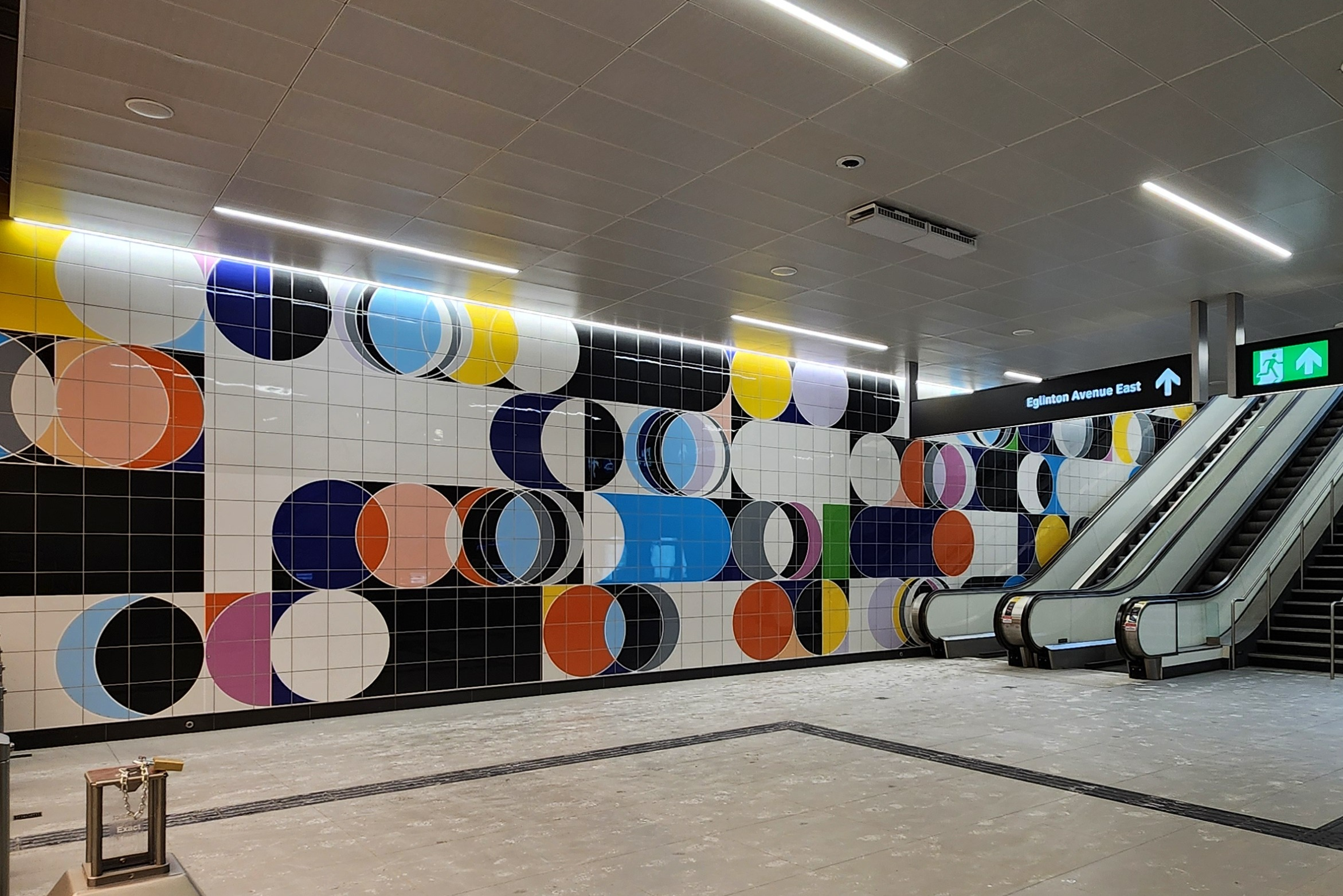
Total Lunar Eclipse by artist Sarah Morris at Don Valley station

=== Public art ===
Eight stations on the line feature artworks. Six of these stations – Mount Dennis, Caledonia, Cedarvale, Eglinton, Don Valley and Kennedy – were chosen because they serve as major interchanges and are expected to host high passenger volumes. Rather than being added after the fact, each piece is integrated into the station's architecture from the outset. The art budget was roughly $10 million, with about $1 million used for digital art to appear on screens. Due to the controversy surrounding the LightSpell artwork at Line 1's Pioneer Village station, which commuters could have used to display inappropriate messages, none of the Line 5 artworks are interactive.

== Operations ==
Operating characteristics of the line include:

- There will be three types of train control on the line. Automatic train control (ATC) without a driver onboard is used within the Eglinton Maintenance and Storage Facility. In the underground segment between Mount Dennis and Laird stations, a driver will operate train doors and push a button to depart a station, with ATC controlling the train until the next station. Between Laird and Kennedy stations, the driver controls all train functions.
- On the surface, the line will have dedicated right-of-way transit lanes separate from regular traffic and usage of priority signalling at intersections to ensure certainty in travel times – unlike the streetcars in downtown Toronto and southern Etobicoke or on St. Clair Avenue in midtown Toronto.
- Light rail vehicles and subway trains can both travel up to 80 kilometres per hour (50 mph). However, actual speed is determined by the spacing of the stops and the dwell times at stops. Line 5 vehicles were planned to have an average speed of 28 kilometres per hour (17 mph). As a comparison, the average speed of the Line 2 Bloor–Danforth subway is 32 kilometres per hour (20 mph). The maximum operating speed is 80 kilometres per hour (50 mph) on the tunnelled portion of the line and 60 kilometres per hour (37 mph) on the street-level sections.
- The projected ridership of the line is 5,400 passengers per hour in the peak direction by 2031, but the capacity of the vehicles is 15,000 passengers per hour per direction.
- The surface section of the line runs on a proof-of-payment system but the underground stations will have subway-type fare gates and staff; Presto cards will be available for use across the entire line.
- Metrolinx requires 76 Flexity Freedom LRVs to operate the line.
- Annual operating and maintenance costs are estimated to be $80 million upon opening of the line. However, fare revenue and the costs saved by eliminating Eglinton bus service would result in a net annual cost of $39 million.
- There are a total of 12 crossovers along the line to reverse LRT trains—seven at underground stations and five on the surface section. Avenue and Laird stations also have a storage track (with Laird having both) that trains can enter and exit in either direction. The storage tracks can accommodate a train in case of an emergency or change in service as well as allowing for a change of direction.
- Line 5 uses a guideway intrusion detection system (GIDS) to detect trespassers on the tracks on the underground sections of the line. When GIDS detects a trespasser on the tracks, it will issue an audio warning to the trespasser, provide live CCTV video to central control, and automatically stop the train without driver intervention. Each station will have ten GIDS scanners, five on each side of the platform. There are also GIDS scanners at each tunnel portal. In addition, there are three scanners within the yellow tactile strips at each platform edge to issue an audio warning if a person steps on it before the train has arrived.

=== Rolling stock ===
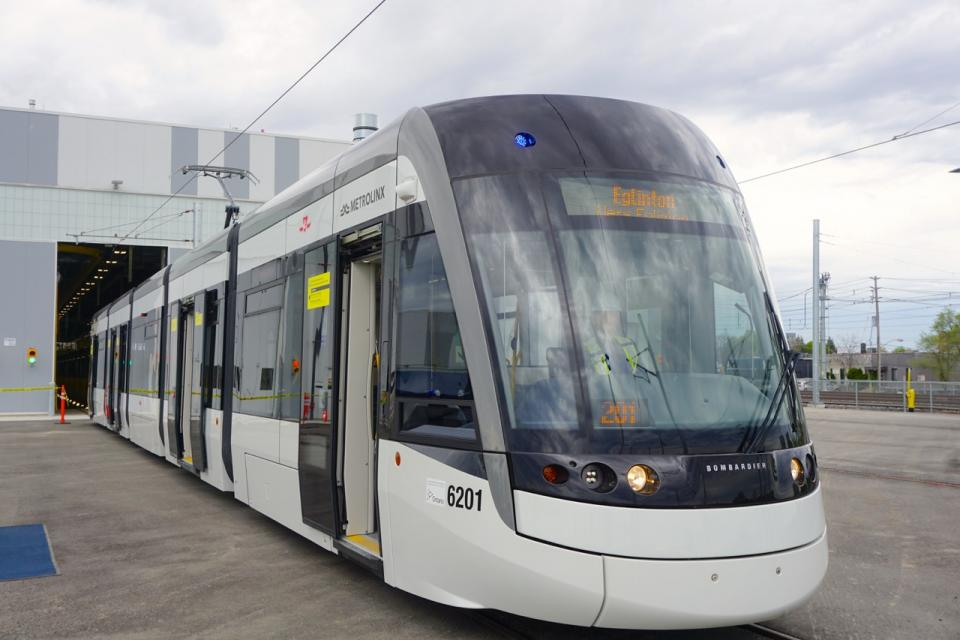
Flexity Freedom light rail vehicle, built by Bombardier

As the line is owned by the province of Ontario, Metrolinx chose the Bombardier Flexity Freedom light rail vehicle, which uses standard gauge rather than the TTC's own slightly larger gauge. Metrolinx wanted to avoid using a custom gauge in order to secure a better price from the manufacturer and to create a standard for other light-rail projects in the province. The vehicles have an operator's cab at only one end of the vehicle; thus, the LRVs must be run in back-to-back coupled pairs. Trains use automatic train control within the tunnelled portion of the line. Like the Flexity Outlook vehicles Bombardier built for the TTC's streetcar system, initial work building the chassis was performed at Bombardier's Mexican plant in Ciudad Sahagún, Hidalgo, with final assembly at Bombardier's plant in Thunder Bay.

In 2010, Metrolinx ordered 182 Flexity Freedom vehicles not only for Line 5 but for other light-rail projects in Ontario. The first two deliveries were expected in the second quarter of 2015 but had not arrived by May 2017. After being unsure if a timely delivery of the Bombardier vehicle order could be relied upon, Metrolinx reduced the Bombardier order from 182 to 76 to supply just Line 5 and made a contingency order with Alstom for 61 Citadis Spirit vehicles, of which 44 would be for Line 5 and the remaining 17 for Line 6 Finch West. If the Flexity Freedom order did arrive after all, surplus Alstom vehicles would be used on other Metrolinx projects (most likely the Hurontario LRT in Mississauga in Peel Region). On October 30, 2018, Bombardier announced that the first Flexity Freedom vehicle had completed its in-house testing and would be delivered for on-site testing in Toronto in November 2018. However, the first vehicle arrived late, on January 8, 2019. As a commissioning test, each vehicle must travel at least 600 km (370 mi) before accepting passengers.

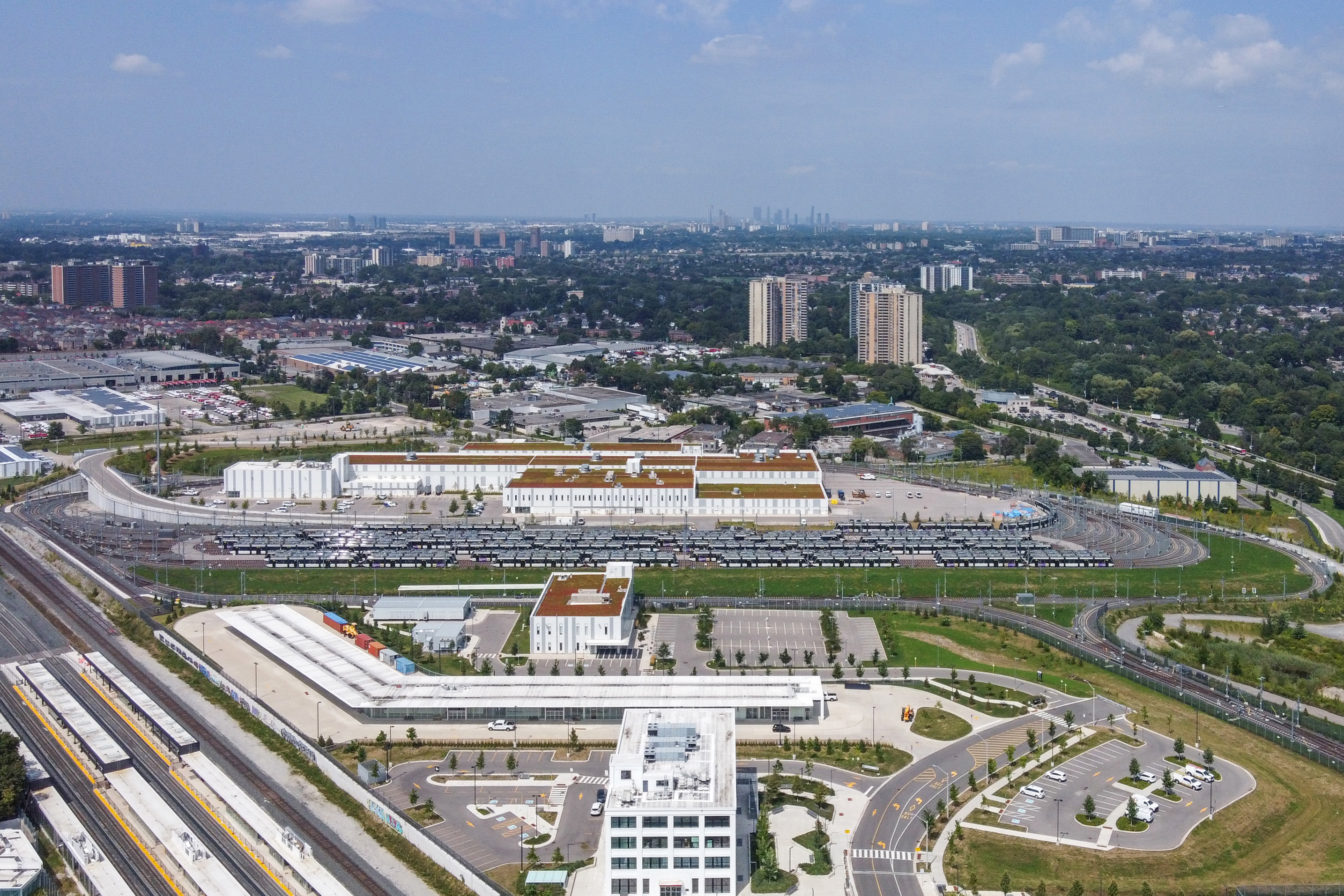
Aerial view of the Eglinton Maintenance and Storage Facility in 2024

=== Eglinton Maintenance and Storage Facility ===
A maintenance and storage facility is required for Line 5, given the new technology employed, track gauge and the number of vehicles ordered. The Eglinton Maintenance and Storage Facility (EMSF) has storage for 162 Flexity Freedom LRT vehicles and has extensive maintenance facilities to keep them running smoothly. The facility is located near the line's western terminus at Mount Dennis station on lands formerly occupied by Kodak's Toronto campus and near the Mount Dennis bus garage.

The site includes a backup power facility adjacent to the CN/CP rail corridor at the northwest corner of the EMSF. In the event of a widespread power outage, the new facility will provide Line 5 vehicles with up to four hours of electrical power. The facility will use lithium-ion batteries, which will be charged overnight in order to reduce peak-period power demands and operating costs. The batteries will have a capacity of 10 MW / 30 MWh, equivalent to what is needed to power 8000 homes for a year. The roof of the facility will have about 250 solar panels to generate 90 kW DC of electricity.

== Extension to Renforth and Pearson Airport ==
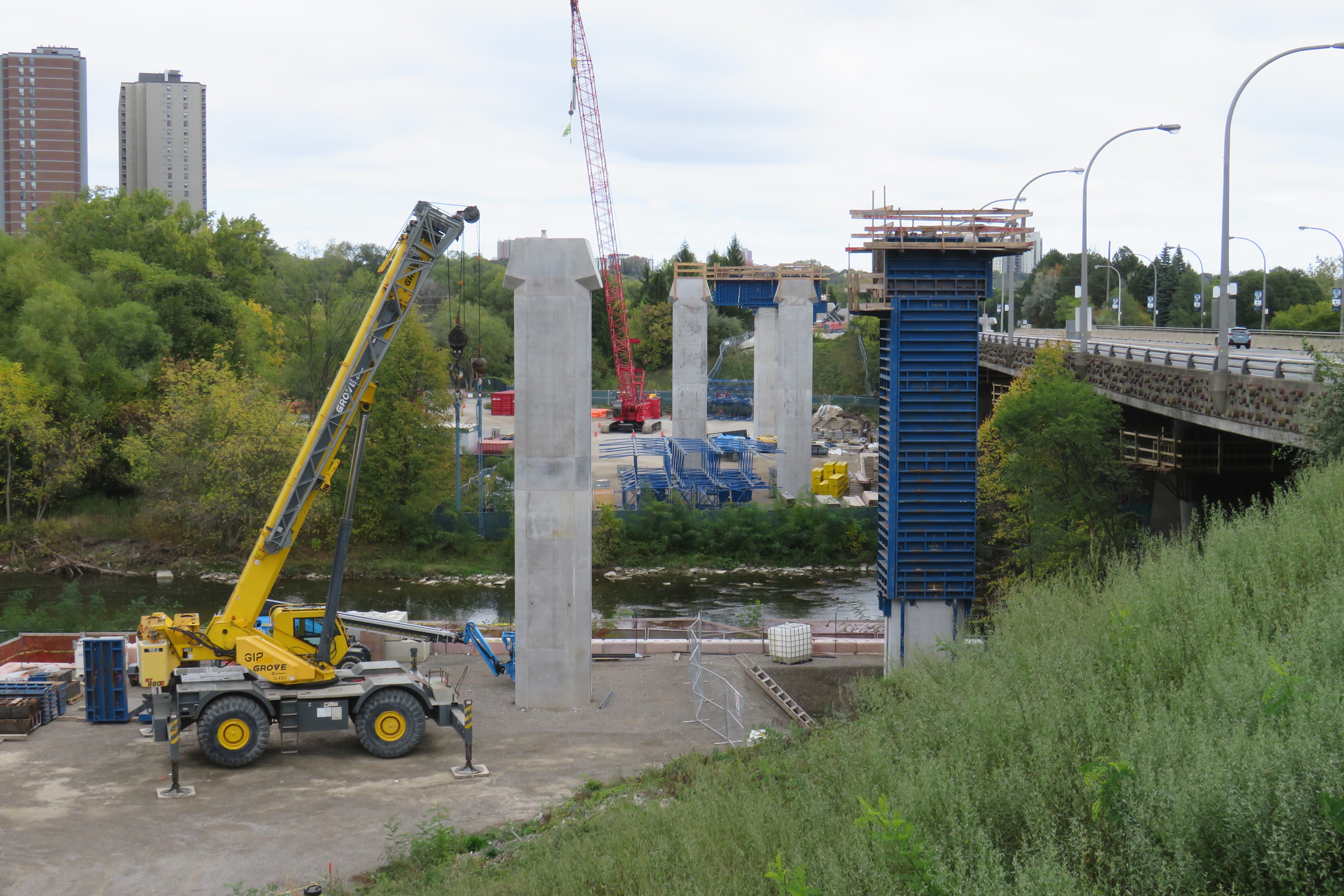
Construction of Humber River bridge piers in October 2025

The line is being extended west of Mount Dennis station to Renforth, the eastern terminal station of the existing Mississauga Transitway, a bus rapid transit line in the adjacent City of Mississauga. The 9.2-kilometre (6-mile) extension will add seven new stations – four underground, two elevated and one within an open trench. Preliminary construction work began in 2020 when the first phase of Line 5 was still under construction, with the tunnelling contract awarded in 2021. Forecast to serve 96,700 daily riders, the project was estimated in 2026 to cost $3.97 billion to construct. Metrolinx has proposed extending the line farther still to Toronto Pearson International Airport in the future.

== Eglinton East LRT ==
Under Mayor John Tory, Toronto City Council approved an eastern extension for Line 5 Eglinton on March 31, 2016, and it is a City of Toronto project still in the proposal stage. However, in May 2022, the Eglinton East LRT (EELRT) became a proposal for a separate line rather than an extension of Line 5.

Between 2016 and 2021, the City of Toronto proposed that the EELRT be an eastward extension of Line 5 Eglinton, extending from Kennedy station to Malvern Town Centre via Eglinton Avenue East, Kingston Road and Morningside Avenue and also serving University of Toronto Scarborough. By 2022, the city had decided that the EELRT would be a separate, independent line with no rail connection to Line 5 at Kennedy station. Unlike Line 5 Eglinton and its western extension, which are Metrolinx projects, the EELRT is a City of Toronto project.

By 2022, city planning staff had concluded a through-service connection with Line 5 at Kennedy station was not feasible as an EELRT tunnel would be only 2 metres (6 ft 7 in) above the SSE tunnel at Kennedy station, and the SSE tunnel structure would not be strong enough to safely support an EELRT tunnel above it. As a separate line, the EELRT would use trains 50 metres (160 ft) long or less. The EELRT would use its own distinct vehicles (i.e. different from those used on Line 5 Eglinton) in order to better adapt to the line's conditions: no running in tunnels, shorter trains and platforms, and a better ability to climb steeper grades to avoid expensive road infrastructure changes that would otherwise be required if the EELRT were a Line 5 extension. It would also connect with Line 2 again at Sheppard Avenue East and McCowan Road, as well as with a potential Line 4 eastern extension.

== See also ==
- Jane LRT – Proposed light rail public transit line in Toronto, Canada
- Urban rail transit in Canada – List of Canadian passenger rail systems confined to urban areas
