= Beau =

Beau may refer to:

- Beau (name), a list of people and fictional characters with the given name, nickname or surname
- Beau (guitarist) (born 1946), songwriter and 12-string guitar specialist
- Beau (grape), another name for the Italian wine grape Trebbiano
- "Beau" (poem), a poem by James Stewart
- The Beau, a short-lived Irish literary journal
- Beau's All Natural Brewing Company, a Canadian microbrewery
- "Beau", a synonym for boyfriend

== See also ==
- Beau Geste (disambiguation)
- Beau Jack (1921–2000), American lightweight boxer born Sidney Walker
- Beau Jocque (1953–1999), American zydeco musician born Andrus J. Espre
- Beau Monga (born 1994), winner of New Zealand The X Factor
- Beaux, a commune in France
- Beaux (surname)
- LeBeau (disambiguation)
- Bo (disambiguation)
- Bow (disambiguation)
