= Bow (name) =

Bow is an English surname. It is also a given name.

People with the name include:

== Surname ==
- Robert Henry Bow (1827–1909), Scottish civil engineer and photographer
- Richard Bow (1868–1941), Australian politician from Queensland
- Lily Lawrence Bow (1870–1943), American librarian, namesake of the Lily Lawrence Bow Library
- Malcolm Ross Bow (1887–1982), Canadian public health officer
- Warren E. Bow (1891–1945), American educator
- Frank T. Bow (1901–1972), American politician and jurist from Ohio
- Clara Bow (1905–1965), American actress
- Malcolm Norman Bow (1918–2005), Canadian diplomat
- Glen Bow (1935–2006), Australian rules footballer
- Buddy Red Bow (1948–1993), American Lakota musician
- Erin Bow (born 1971), Canadian writer
- Sharyn Bow (born 1971), Australian cricket player
- Landon Bow (born 1995), Canadian professional ice hockey goaltender
- William Bow (1878–1929), Scottish footballer

== Given name ==
- Bow Kum (1888–1909), Chinese girl murdered in New York City
- Bow Ditama (fl. 1990s–present), Japanese manga artist
- Bow Thayer (fl. 1990s–present), American singer-songwriter

== Fictional characters ==
- Bow (Masters of the Universe), a character from the cartoon She-Ra: Princess of Power
- Rainbow "Bow" Johnson, a character from the sitcoms Black-ish and Mixed-ish
- Laura Bow, a lady in Laura Bow and Laura Bow 2
