= Bow =

Bow most often refers to:

- Bow and arrow, a weapon
- Bowing, bending the upper body as a social gesture
- An ornamental knot made of ribbon

Bow may also refer to:

- Bow (watercraft), the furthest front part of a ship or boat
- Bow (position), the rower seated in the bow of a racing shell

== Knots ==
- Bow knot, a shoelace knot or a rosette
- Bow tie, a type of necktie
- Pussy bow, a style of neckwear

== Music ==
- Bow (music), used to play a stringed instrument
- Musical bow, a musical instrument resembling an archer's bow
- EBow, electronic device for playing the electric guitar
- Bows (band), a band from the UK
- B.O.W. (born 1970), Finnish rapper
- "Bow", a song by Kasabian from the album 48:13

== Porcelain ==
- Bow porcelain factory

== Places ==
=== England ===
- Bow, Devon, a village in mid Devon
- Bow, a hamlet in the parish of Ashprington in South Devon
- Bow, London, a district
- Bow, Oxfordshire, a hamlet

=== United States ===
- Bow, Kentucky
- Bow, New Hampshire
- Bow, Washington

=== Canada ===
- The Bow (skyscraper), Calgary, Alberta
- Bow River, Alberta

== Other ==
- Bow (name), including a list of people with the surname or given name
- Bow and warp of semiconductor wafers and substrates
- Rema language (ISO-639: bow), Papuan language spoken in New Guinea

== See also ==
- BOW (disambiguation)
- Beau (disambiguation)
- Bo (disambiguation)
- Bow Creek (disambiguation)
- Bowman (disambiguation)
- Earwire
