= The Bow =

The Bow can refer to:

- The Bow (film), a 2005 Korean film
- The Bow (skyscraper), a building in Calgary, Alberta
- The Bow River, a river in the Canadian province of Alberta
- The Bow Back Rivers, part of the River Lea in east London

== See also ==
- Bow (disambiguation)
