= Malcolm Bow =

Malcolm Bow may refer to:

- Malcolm Ross Bow (1887–1982), Canadian public health officer
- Malcolm Norman Bow (1918–2005), Canadian diplomat
