= LeBeau (surname) =

LeBeau or Le Beau is a French surname. It may refer to:

== People ==
- Anita Lebeau, Canadian filmmaker and director of the 2003 animated short Louise
- Bettina Le Beau (1932–2015), Belgian actress
- Charles le Beau (1701–1778), French historical writer
- Charles-Louis Lebeau (1812–1882), Belgian politician in the Charleroi
- Chris Lebeau (1878–1945), Dutch artist
- Désirée Le Beau (1907-1993), Austro-Hungarian-American industrial chemist
- Dick LeBeau (born 1937), American Hall of Fame football player, defensive coordinator, and head coach
- Dominique Lebeau (born 1975), Canadian musician formerly in Les Cowboys Fringants
- Gary LeBeau (born 1947), American politician
- Gilles Lebeau (born 1954), French mathematician
- Joseph Lebeau (1794–1865), second Prime Minister of Belgium
- Luise Adolpha Le Beau (1850–1927), German composer of classical music
- Madeleine Lebeau (1923–2016), French actress
- Paul Lebeau (1868–1959), French chemist
- Paul Lebeau (writer) (1908–1982), Flemish writer
- Pierre Lebeau (born 1954), Canadian actor
- Pierre le Beau (born 1986), German footballer
- Patrick Lebeau (born 1970), Canadian ice hockey player
- Rebekah LeBeau, American singer-songwriter and daughter of Contemporary Christian music artist Keith Green
- Richard Lebeau (born 1953), French Egyptologist, historian
- Stéphan Lebeau (born 1968), Canadian ice hockey player
- Suzanne Lebeau (born 1948), Canadian playwright and actress
- William H. Lebeau (born 1938), American rabbi

== Pen name ==
- Roy LeBeau, pen name of American crime and science fiction author Mitchell Smith

== Fictional characters ==
- Corporal Louis LeBeau, on the TV series Hogan's Heroes
- Gambit (Marvel Comics) (Remy LeBeau), Marvel Comics superhero

== See also ==
- Dubeau, another surname
