= Telus Sky =

Skyscraper in Calgary, Alberta, Canada

Calgary House (skyscraper)
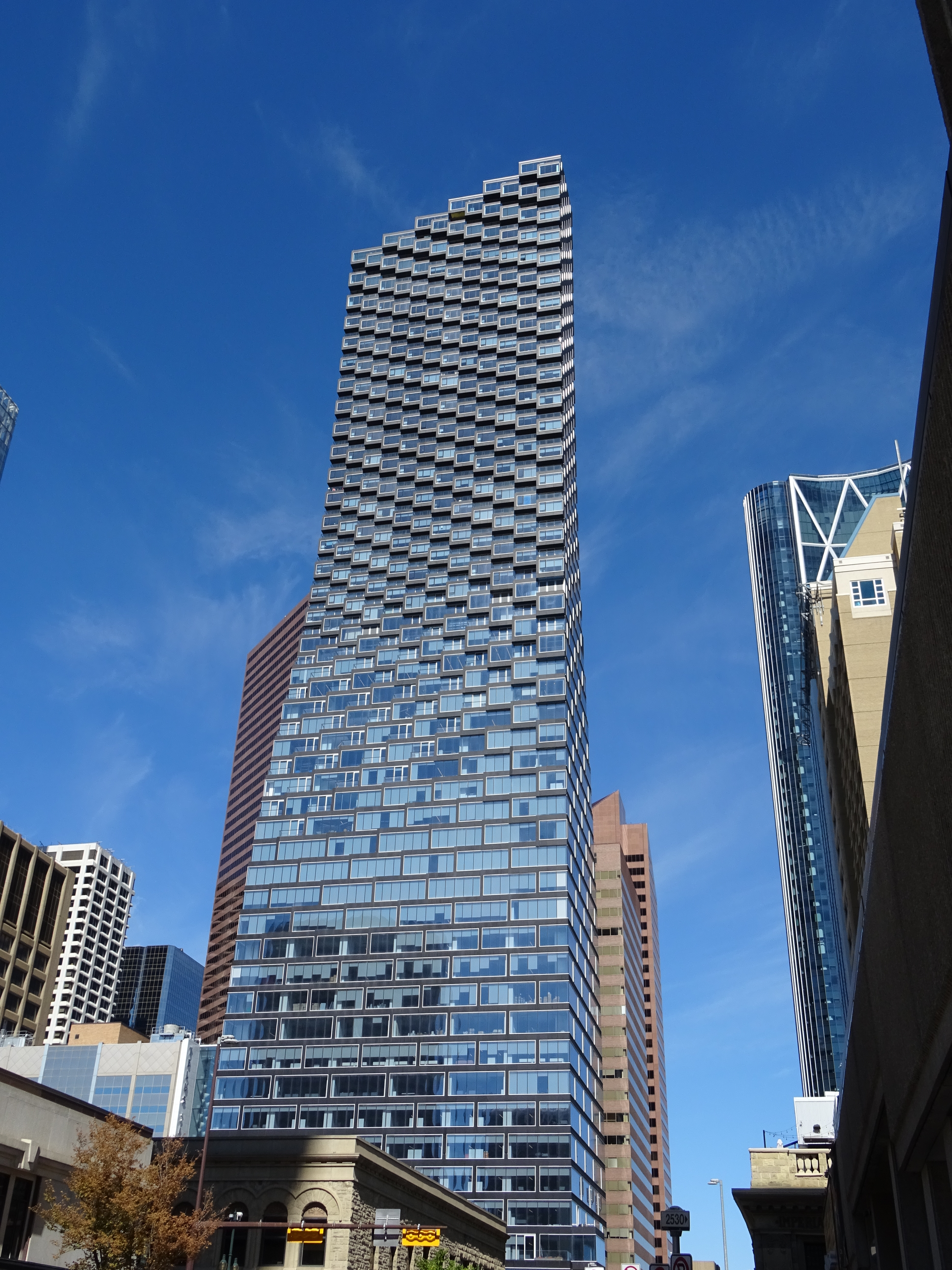
- Calgary House in September 2021

General information
- Status: Completed
- Type: Mixed-use (Residential & Commercial)
- Location: 685 Centre Street SW, Calgary, Alberta, Canada
- Coordinates: 51.0468°N 114.0636°W
- Construction started: 2015
- Completed: 2020
- Cost: CA$400 million

Height
- Roof: 222.3 m (729 ft)

Technical details
- Floor count: 60
- Floor area: 70,721 m^{2} (761,230 sq ft)

Design and construction
- Architects: Bjarke Ingels Group & Dialog

Other information
- Number of rooms: 326

Website
- living.westbankcorp.com/property/calgary-house/

Calgary House, (formerly known as TELUS Sky) is a 60-storey, 222.3 m (729 ft) mixed-use skyscraper in downtown Calgary, Alberta, Canada. At completion in 2019, the structure building became the third-tallest building in Calgary behind Brookfield Place East and The Bow. As of July 2020, Calgary House is the 18th tallest building in Canada..

Calgary House incorporates 70,721 m^{2} (761,230 sq ft) of mixed-use area available. There is a total of 39,181 m^{2} (421,740 sq ft) of office space within the structure, of which 12,033 m^{2} (129,520 sq ft) is leased to Telus Communications, a Canadian telecommunications company that is a subsidiary of Telus Corporation.

== History ==
On July 4, 2013, the Telus Corporation announced the development of the $400-million ($534-million in 2025) Telus Sky, designed by the architectural firms Bjarke Ingels Group and Dialog, which promised to provide a new architectural landmark to Calgary's Downtown to be completed in 2017. The announcement included plans for a 750,000 sq ft (70,000 m^{2}) mixed-use tower to incorporate office, retail and residential space. Of which there was to be 26 floors totaling 430,000 sq ft (40,000 m^{2}) of office space with Telus reserving 155,000 sq ft (14,400 m^{2}). Calgary House would also host 341 residential units on the upper 32 floors and 15,000 sq ft (1,400 m^{2}) of retail space, mostly on the second floor connected to the city's Plus 15 pedway system. The design included LEED Platinum status and a number of sustainable design features including a storm water management system, and a 5,500 sq ft (510 m^{2}) public gallery.

The building was designed with a clean rectangular base and bottom floors for efficient open-office layouts, and as the building rises, the floor plates slowly reduce in size and pixilate creating small balconies and terraces.

Prior the construction of Telus Sky, the corner of 7 Avenue & Centre St SW was home to a three-storey building constructed in 1928 and hosted Art Central, a place where local artists could create and showcase their talent in small galleries and studios. The building was demolished in November 2014.

Construction on Telus Sky started in February 2015. Due to the small footprint of the site, there was not enough room for traditional excavators or ramps to facilitate digging the base, instead a hydraulic crane using a clam-shell bucket was used to excavate the 80,000 m^{3} (100,000 cu yd) of dirt to a depth of up to 31 m (102 ft) to create the base of the building.

Construction of the Telus Sky continued past the original completion date of 2017, with delays causing construction to continue into 2019. The first commercial tenants were scheduled to move in July 2019 and the residential rental suites received bookings for September 2019.

== Public Art ==
Calgary House’s northern and southern facades are clad in a dynamic LED display dubbed "Northern Lights", designed by Canadian artist Douglas Coupland, which is one of the largest public art fixtures in Canada.

The LED light strips that make up the art piece are equipped with an infinite number of colour shades and combinations. The Northern Lights display will go through five 12-minute sequences per hour. With the starting sequence always being a mimic of the aurora borealis, and the remaining four sequences to be interchangeable. The public art features an interactive smartphone app that will give users information about what inspired the current pattern at any given sequence, and will be online from sunrise to sunset, 365 days a year. The Northern Lights display was first previewed on April 19, 2019.

=== Tenants ===
Following the collapse in oil prices in 2015, the Calgary real-estate market began to suffer from growing vacant downtown office space, which Calgary House has not been immune. As of April 2020, Calgary House has an occupancy level of 60%, which is split among five commercial tenants, of which the Telus Corporation represents 140,000 square feet (13,006 m^{2}) or 33% of the occupancy.

== Construction ==
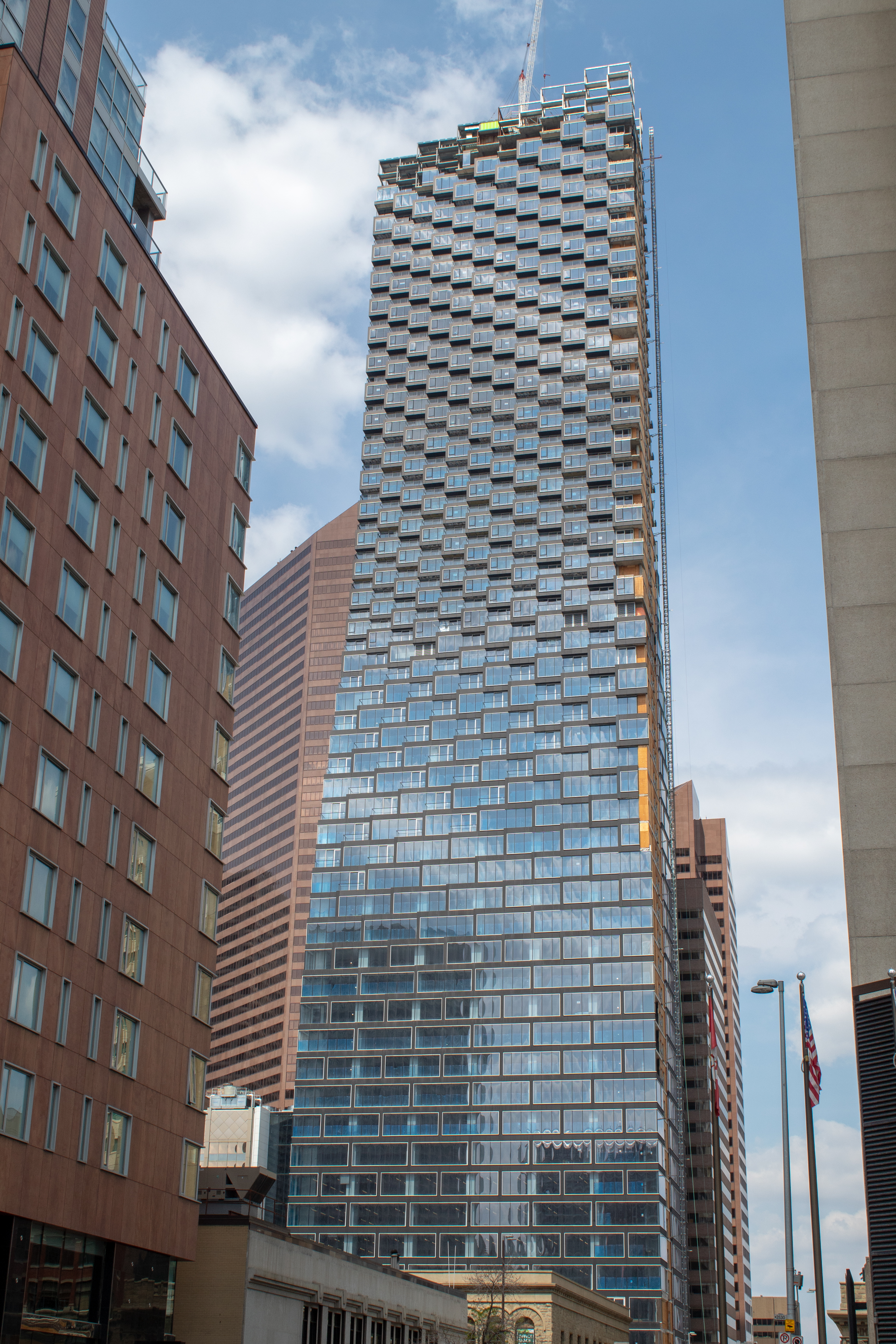
May 2019

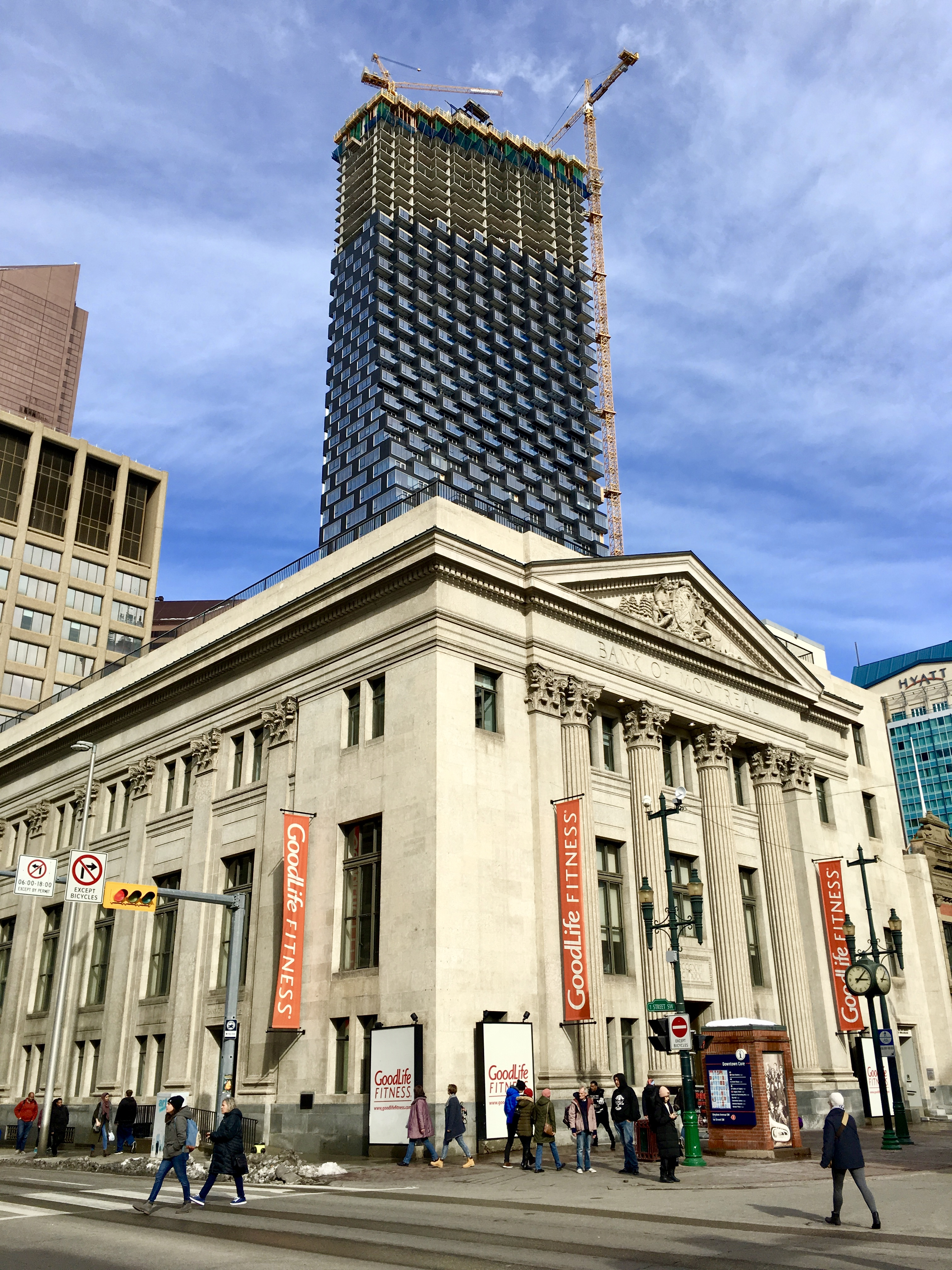
October 2018

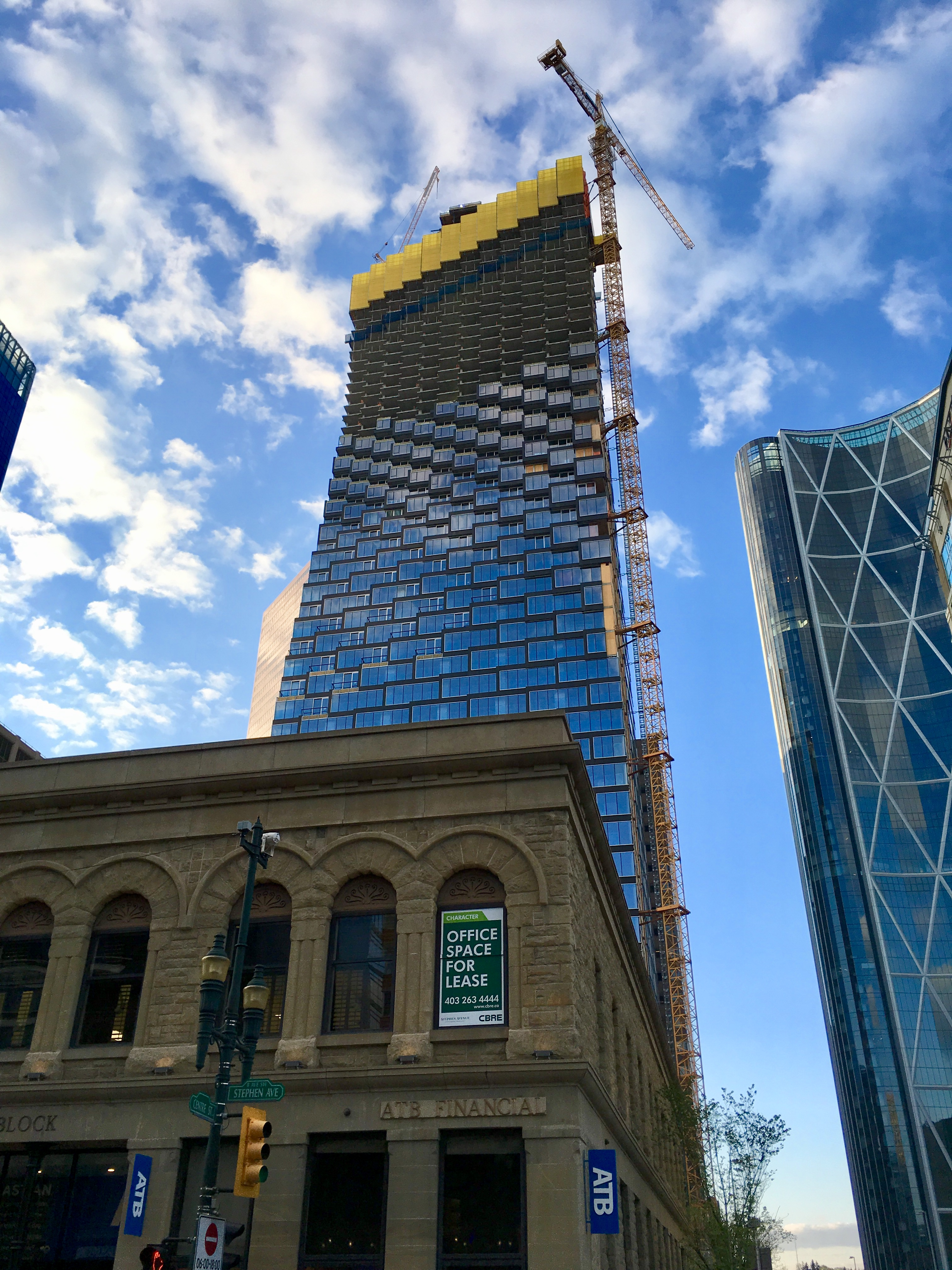
May 2018

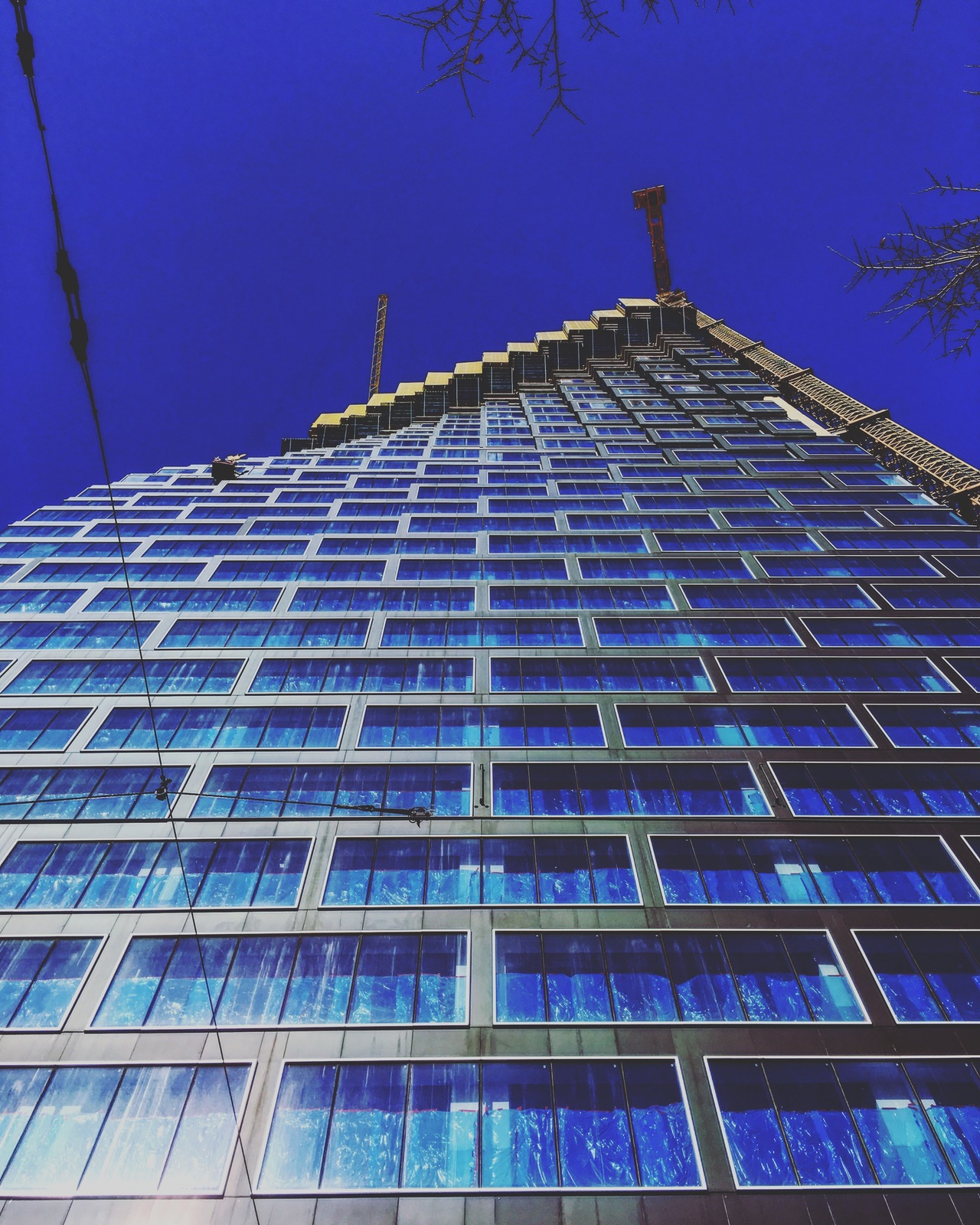
March 2018

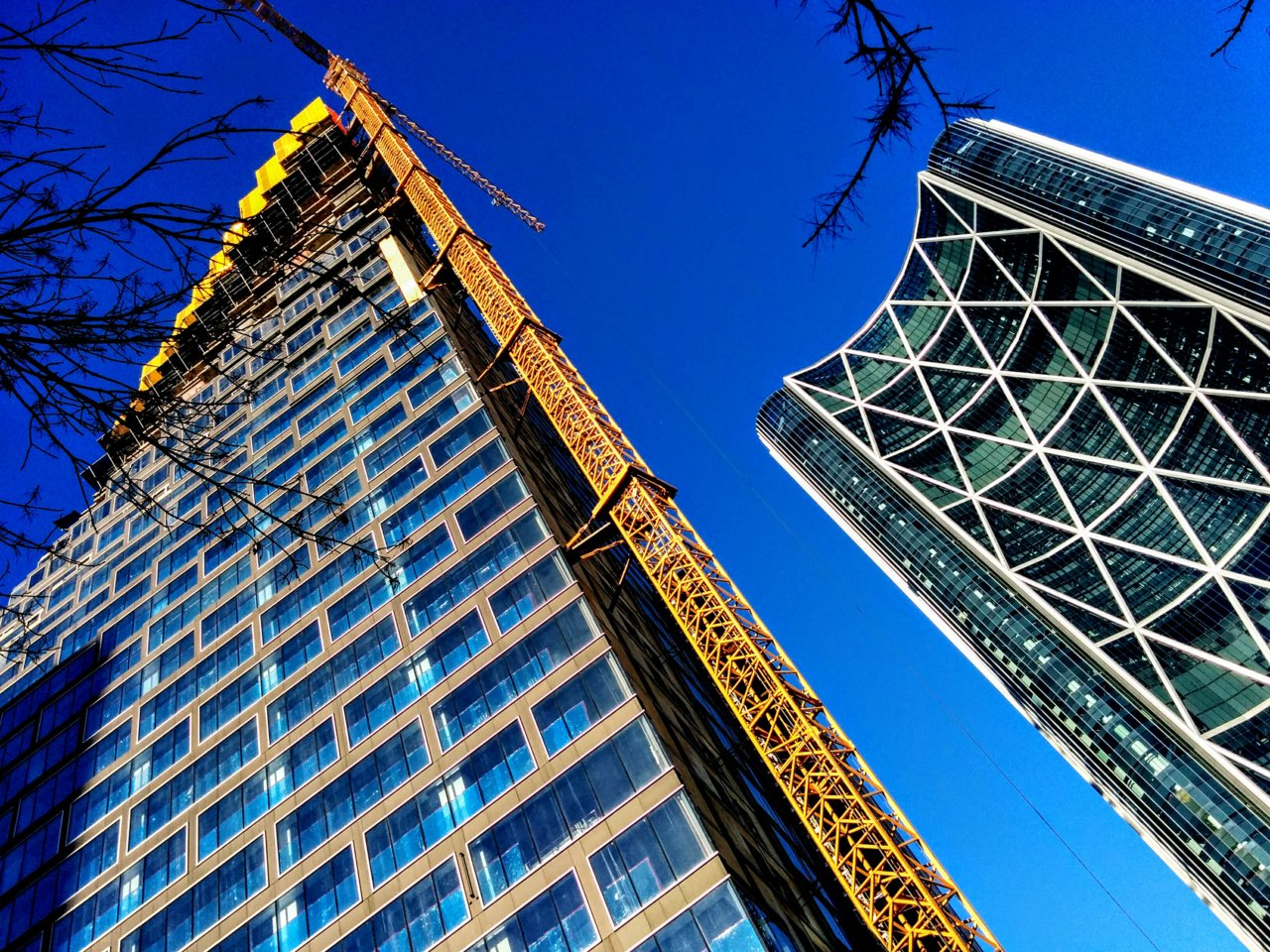
January 2018

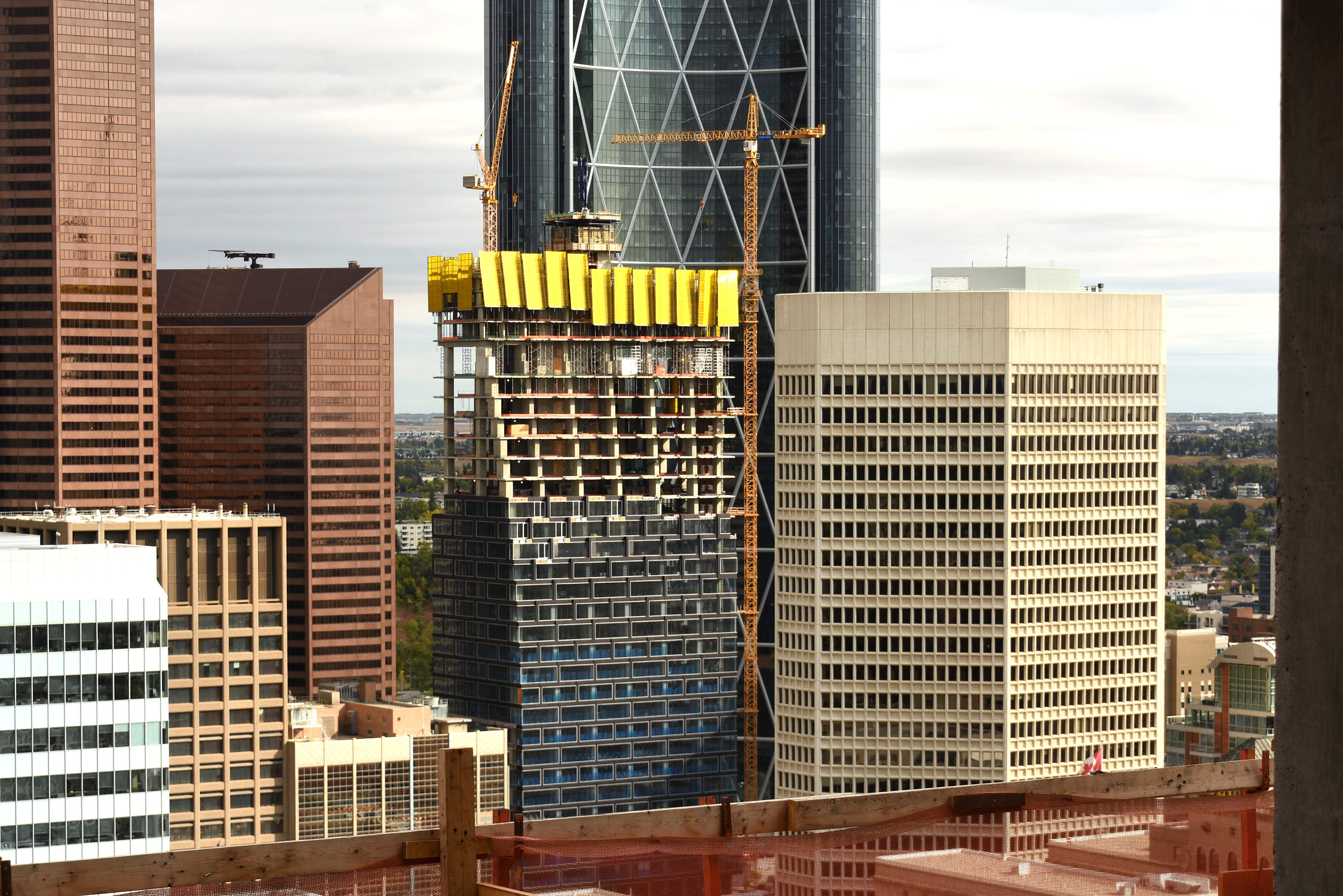
September 2017

== See also ==
- List of tallest buildings in Calgary
