= LeBeau =

LeBeau or Le Beau may refer to:

- LeBeau (surname)
- Lebeau, Louisiana, an unincorporated community
- LeBeau, South Dakota, a ghost town

== See also ==
- LeBeau Plantation, Arabi, Louisiana
- Saint-Martin-le-Beau, a commune in the Indre-et-Loire department in central France
- Beau (disambiguation)
