= Beaux (surname) =

Beaux is a French surname. Notable people with the surname include:

- Cecilia Beaux (1855–1942), American painter
- Ernest Beaux (1881–1961), Russian-born French perfumer

== See also ==
- Beaux
