= One Palliser Square =

Coordinates: 51.0441°N 114.0608°W

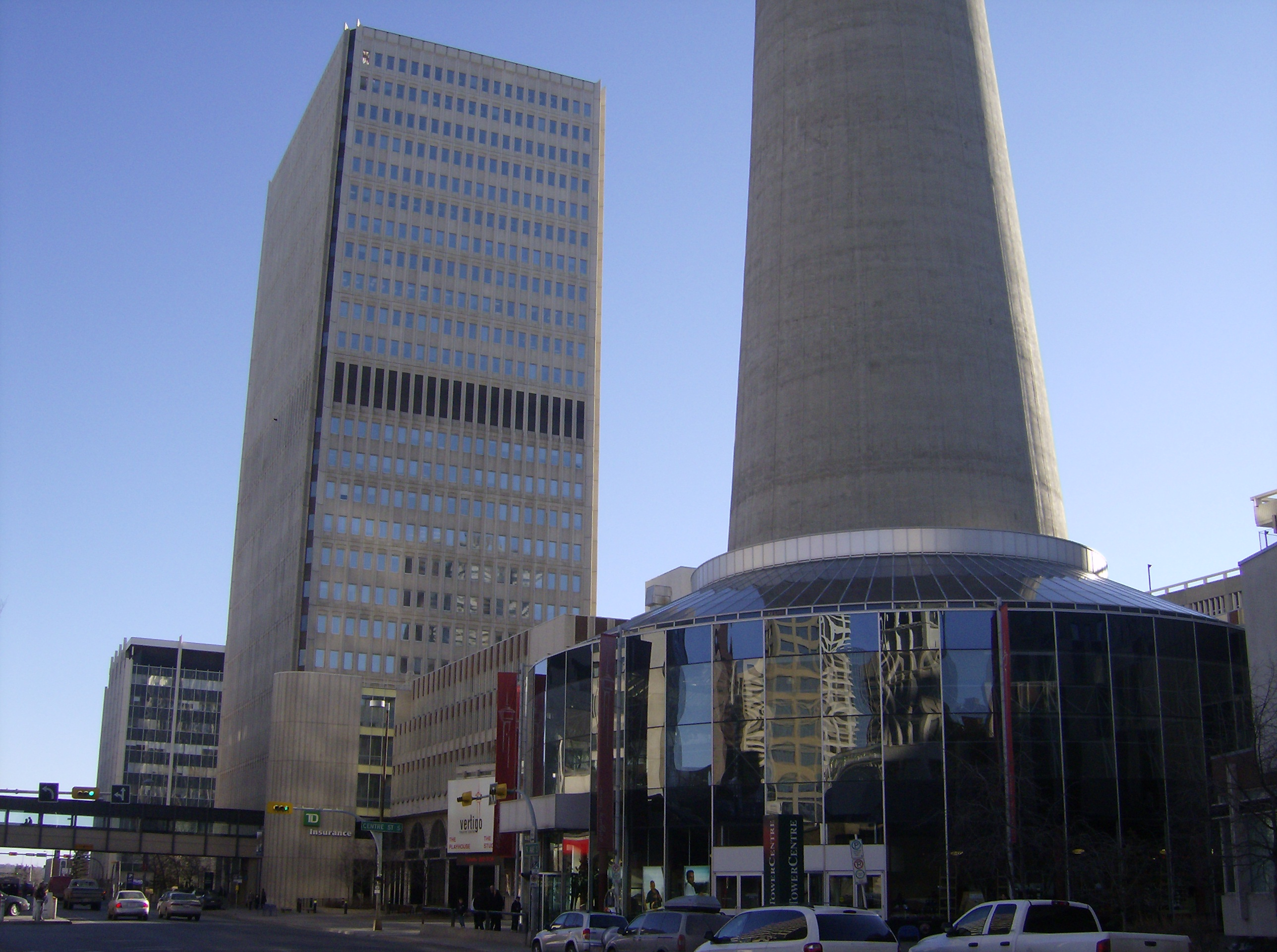
- One Palliser Square is the building to the left of the base of the Calgary Tower
- Interactive map of the One Palliser Square area

General information
- Status: Completed
- Location: Calgary, Alberta, 125 9th Avenue SE, Canada
- Completed: 1970

Height
- Height: 107 m (351 ft)

Technical details
- Material: Concrete
- Floor count: 27
- Floor area: 33,908 m^{2} (364,980 sq ft)

Design and construction
- Architects: A. Dale & Associates

One Palliser Square is a 27-story office building in the Calgary downtown core. Completed in 1970, it is 107 metres (351 feet) tall. One Palliser Square is connected to the Calgary Tower via the Tower Centre complex. Accessed from the main floor, this complex is home to a variety of businesses including two theatre companies—Vertigo Mystery Theatre's Playhouse and Studio stages and Lunchbox Theatre—Tower Physio and Calgary's theatre hangout, The Auburn Saloon. As of 2005, the building was owned and operated by Aspen Properties.

== See also ==
- List of tallest buildings in Calgary
