= Calgary Tower =

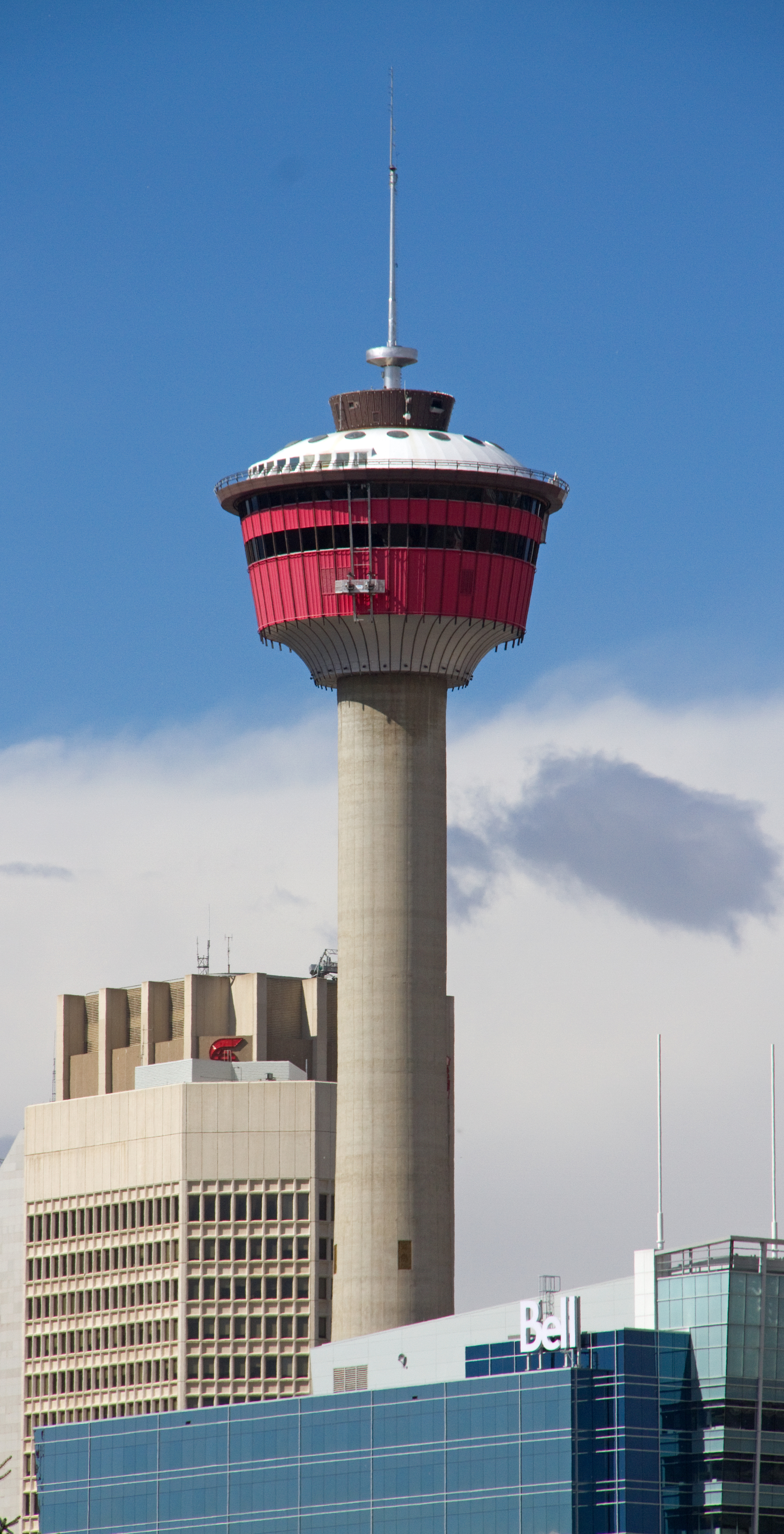
- The Calgary Tower in 2012
- Interactive map of the Calgary Tower area
- Former names: Husky Tower (1968–1971)

General information
- Status: Completed
- Type: Observation tower, Attraction
- Location: 101 9 Avenue SW; Calgary, Alberta
- Coordinates: 51°02′40″N 114°03′49″W
- Construction started: February 19, 1967
- Completed: 1968
- Opening: June 30, 1968
- Cost: CA$3,500,000 (1967)
- Owner: Aspen Properties

Height
- Antenna spire: 190.8 m (626 ft)
- Roof: 171 m (561 ft)
- Top floor: 157.6 m (517 ft)

Technical details
- Lifts/elevators: 2

Design and construction
- Architects: W.G. Milne & A. Dale and Associates

The Calgary Tower is a 190.8-metre (626 ft) free-standing observation tower in the downtown core of Calgary, Alberta, Canada. Originally called the Husky Tower, it was conceived as a joint venture between Marathon Realty Company Limited and Husky Oil as part of an urban renewal plan and to celebrate Canada's centennial of 1967. The tower was built at a cost of CA$3,500,000 and weighs approximately 10,884 tonnes, of which 60% is below ground. It opened to the public on June 30, 1968, as the tallest structure in Calgary and the tallest in Canada outside Toronto. It was renamed the "Calgary Tower" in 1971.

The building is a founding member of the World Federation of Great Towers.

== History ==
=== Planning and construction ===
The project was originally conceived as a joint venture by Marathon Realty (the real estate subsidiary of Canadian Pacific Railway) and Husky Oil for their new head offices in Calgary. They proposed building the tower both to honour Canada's centennial year of 1967 and to encourage urban renewal and growth of downtown Calgary. The structure was designed by A. Dale and Associates, and was designed to withstand earthquakes and winds of up to 160 km/h (100 mph).

The urban renewal project was announced to the public on December 10, 1965, and consisted of a transport terminal, hotel, parking, office facility, and a 170-metre (550 ft) restaurant and observation deck. The chosen site housed Canadian Pacific's Calgary passenger station which was demolished a year after the announcement to make way for the development. The provincial government reviewed the tower proposal for consideration as a publicly funded centennial project, but Public Works Minister Frederick C. Colborne recommended against the use of public funds for the project. The concept of a centennial tower was originally proposed for Edmonton, but the project was opposed by residents near the chosen site. Former Calgary Mayor Grant MacEwan asked the provincial government to move the project to Calgary, until Marathon and Husky decided to build the project independent of public funds. The plan for the tower continued to change as construction delays occurred and the planned height rose from 170 to 180 metres (550–600 ft).

Construction began on February 19, 1967, and completed in 15 months at a cost of $3.5 million. The column of the tower was built from an unprecedented continual pour of concrete. Pouring began May 15, 1967, and was completed 24 days later at an average growth of 7.6 metres (25 ft) per day, a rate that was praised by industry officials as an "amazing feat of technical and physical workmanship".

Upon completion, the Husky Tower stood 191 metres (626 ft) tall and was the tallest structure of its type in North America. It dominated the Calgary skyline, standing well over twice the height of the previous tallest structure in the city, Elveden House. Developers deliberately misled the public, claiming the tower would stand 187 metres (613 ft), in the hopes of preventing competing developers from surpassing the Husky Tower's height record. Shortly after officials in San Antonio, Texas, attempted to claim the record in announcing the completion of the 190-metre (622 ft) Tower of the Americas, developers revealed the Husky Tower's true height.

The Husky Tower officially opened on June 28–30, 1968, in three separate ceremonies. The observation level featured a lounge/restaurant called the Hitching Post.

=== Later history ===
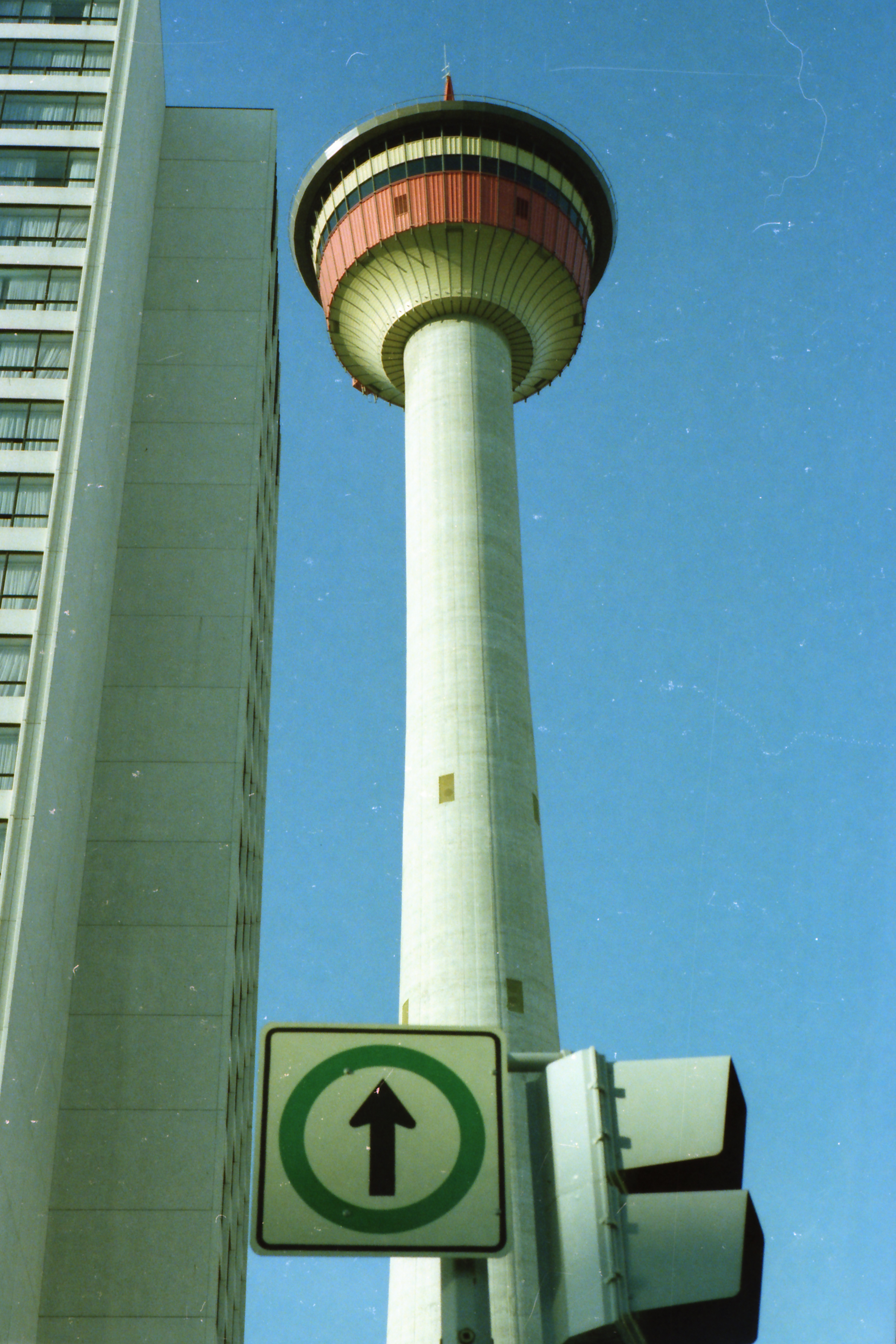
The Calgary Tower in 1978, showing the original red and yellow paint scheme

Marathon Realty acquired a controlling interest in the tower in 1970. The structure was formally renamed the "Calgary Tower" on November 1, 1971, as a tribute to the citizens of Calgary. It is still called the "Husky Tower" by airport officials, however, to distinguish it from the tower at the Calgary International Airport.

The Petro-Canada Centre's west tower overtook the Calgary Tower as the tallest structure in Calgary in 1983.

The tower underwent significant renovations between 1987 and 1990. The addition of a souvenir shop and a revolving restaurant were part of a $2.4 million refurbishment of the upper levels of the tower. In 1990 a glass rotunda to serve as the new lobby was added.

A natural gas-fired cauldron was constructed at the top of the tower by Canadian Western Natural Gas in October 1987 as a gift to celebrate the 1988 Winter Olympics. The torch, which consumes 850 cubic metres (30,000 cu ft) per hour, was first lit on February 13, 1988, when the Games opened, and burned 24 hours a day throughout. It continues to be reignited for various special events, including Canada Day.

The tower was a founding member of the World Federation of Great Towers in 1989 along with the Eiffel Tower, among others. It celebrated its 25th anniversary in 1993, a year in which it topped 500,000 visitors for the first time.

A glass floor extension was constructed on the north side of the tower's observation deck and opened on June 24, 2005. When standing on the glass, one can look straight down on 9th Avenue South and Centre Street.

An LED, multicolour exterior lighting system was added and was first tested on August 1, 2014. 12 lights were added to the crown and 24 to the exterior floor. Each light has been programmed to be able to create over 16.5 million combinations of colour and lighting effects. It has been used since October 8, 2014, becoming a more noticeable part of the city skyline at night.

== Architecture ==
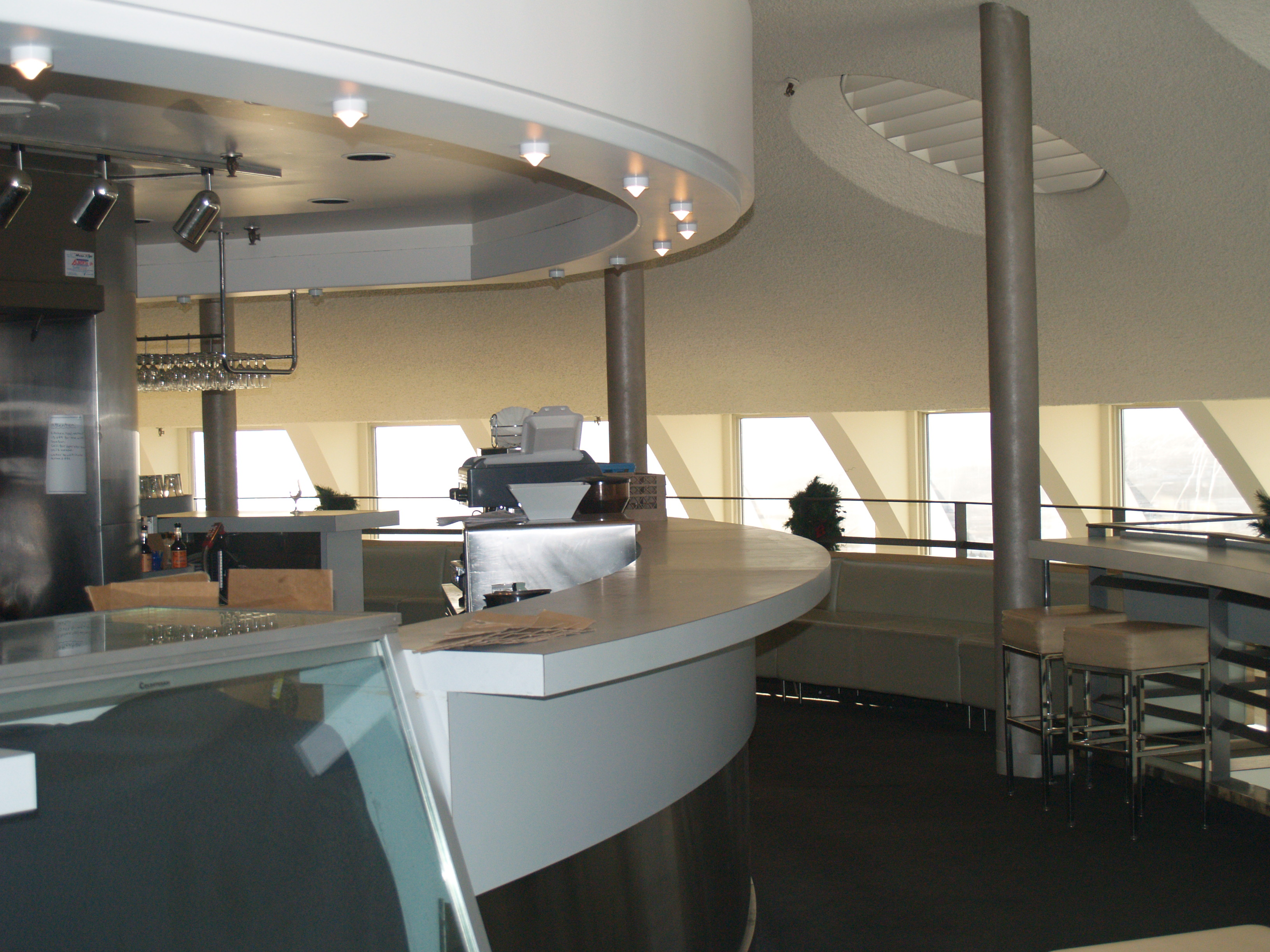
The upper deck

The Calgary tower features a revolving restaurant, Sky 360. The restaurant does a complete rotation every 45 minutes during the day and every 60 minutes in the evening. The base of the tower is connected through the Plus 15 skyway network to One Palliser Square, Fairmont Palliser Hotel and EnCana Place. Stairs to the observation deck are not opened to the public, but have been used on occasions for publicity, as well as for an annual charity stair-climbing race. There are 802 steps.

The Vertigo Theatre, founded in 1976 originally as Pleiades Theatre, is at the base of the tower. They have been entertaining the city from their location in the Calgary Tower since 2003, providing a full season of plays in the mystery genre, for adult and youth audiences.

The tower also features a carillon that was presented to the city by the local Dutch community in 1975 as part of the city's centennial celebrations. It was played daily at noon until removed in 1987 for storage. The carillon has since been refurbished and restored to operation.

== Gallery ==
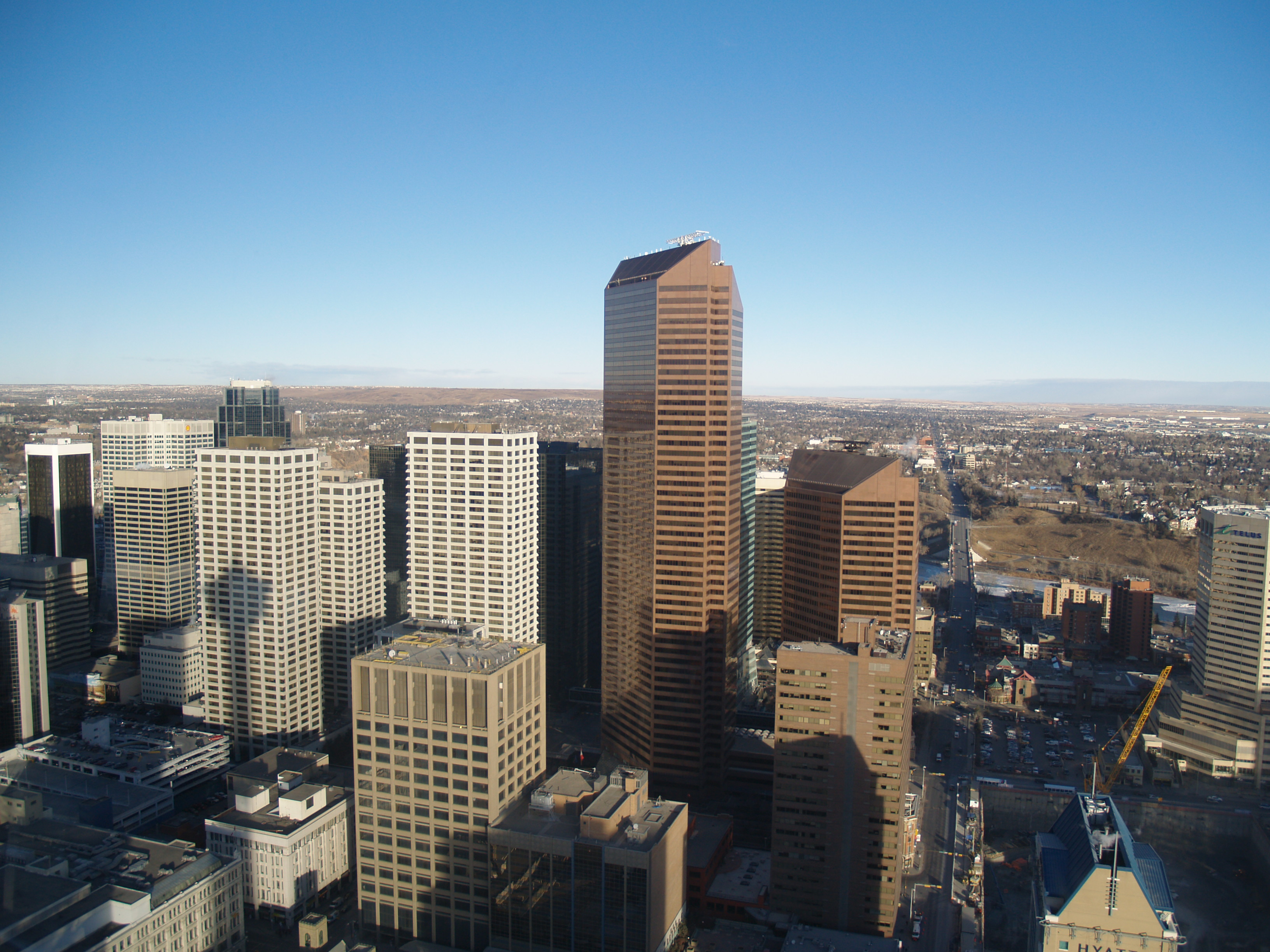
A skyline view from the tower

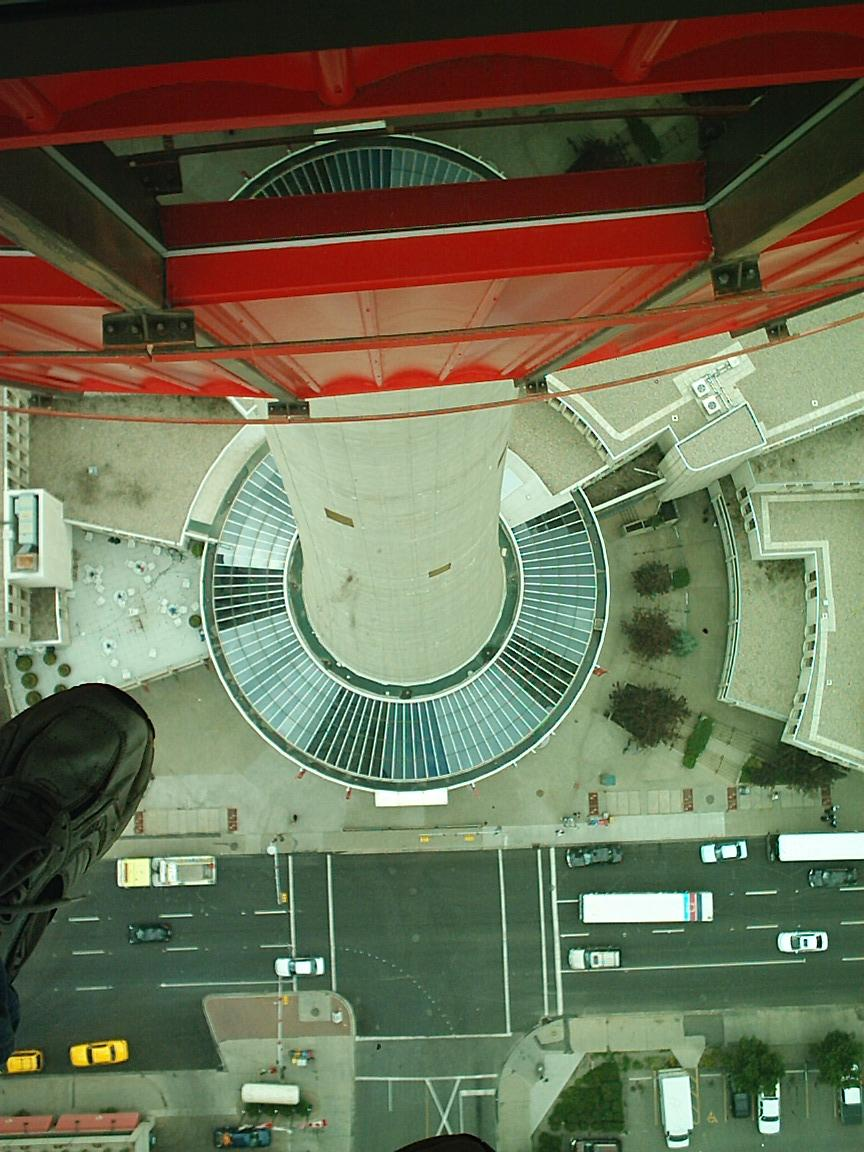
A view from the glass floor extension on the observation deck

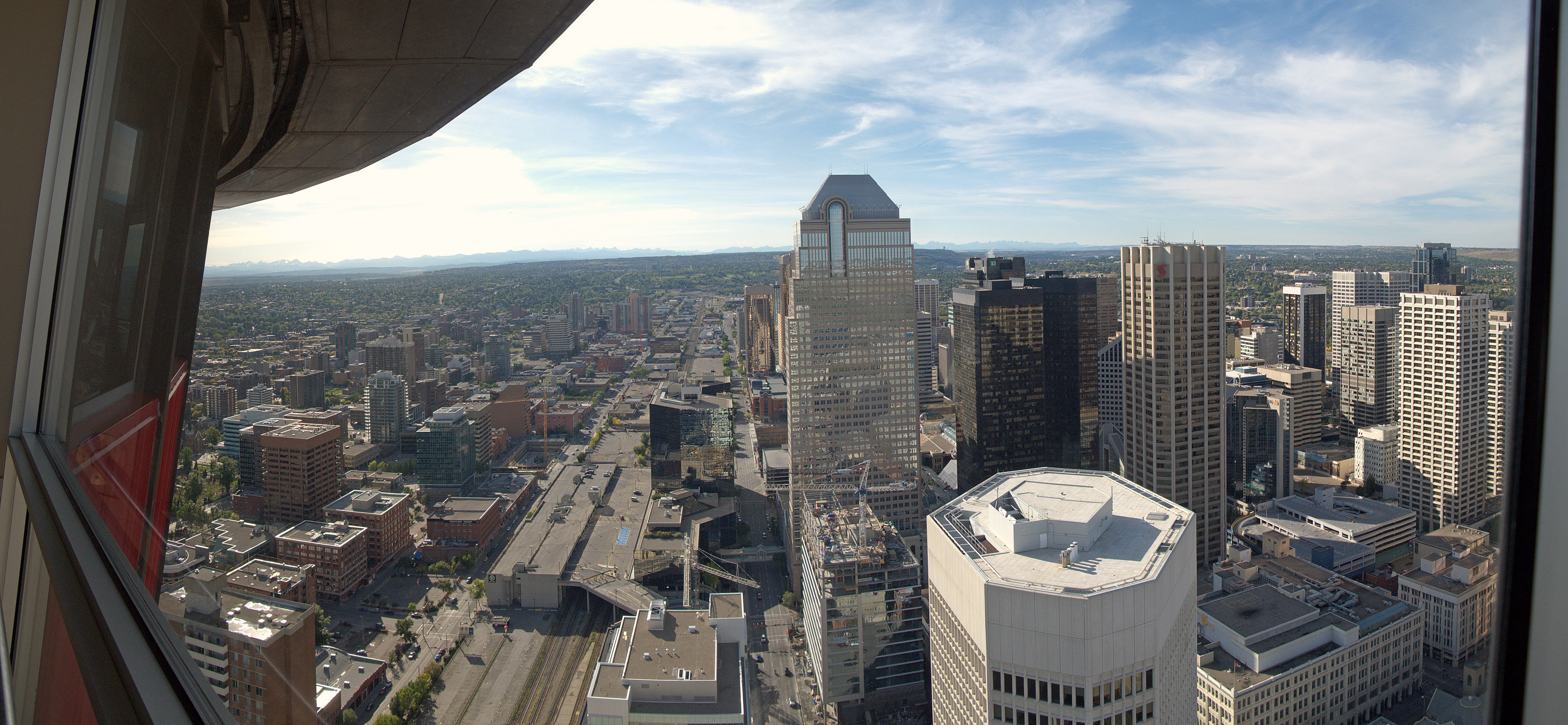
Wide angle view into downtown core

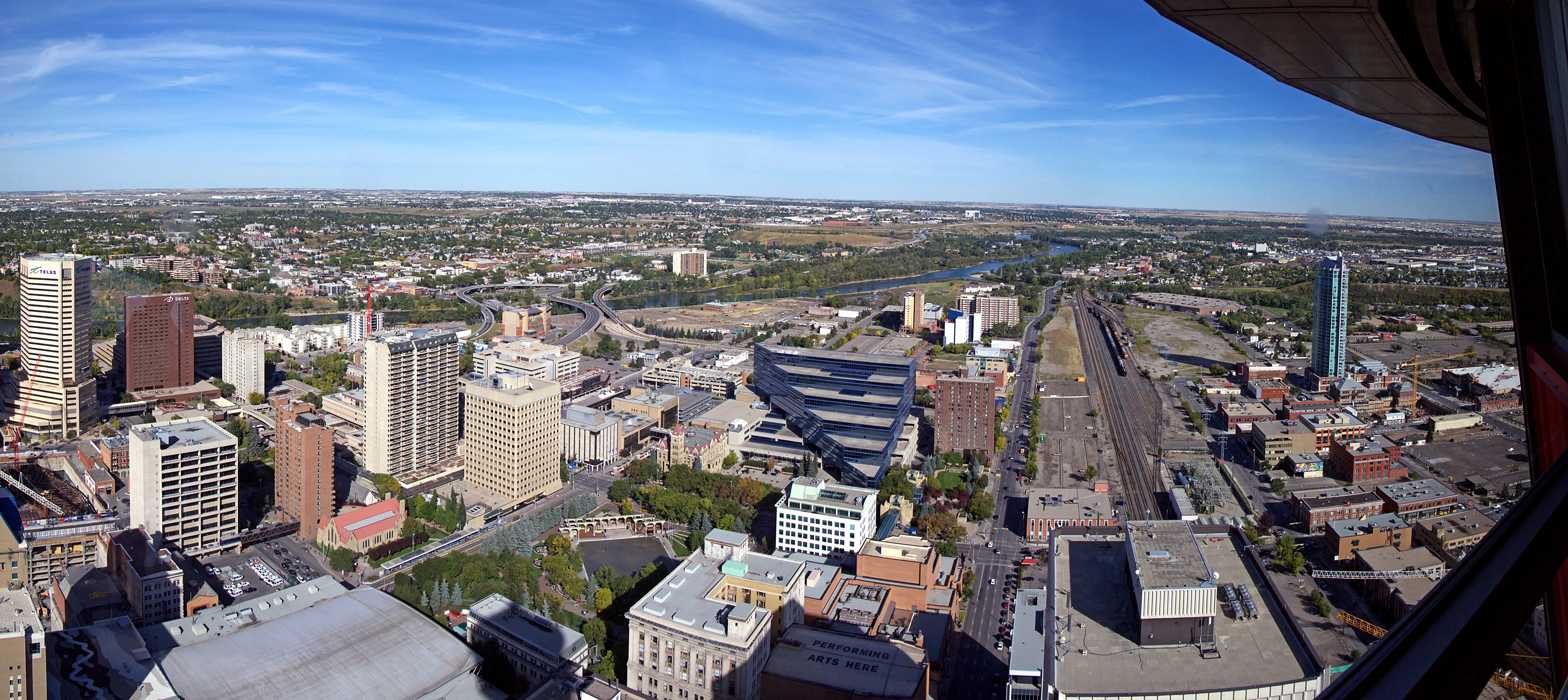
Panoramic view towards the northeast

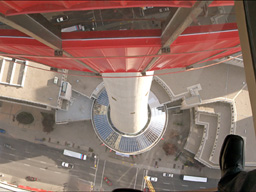
Panoramic view through the glass floor

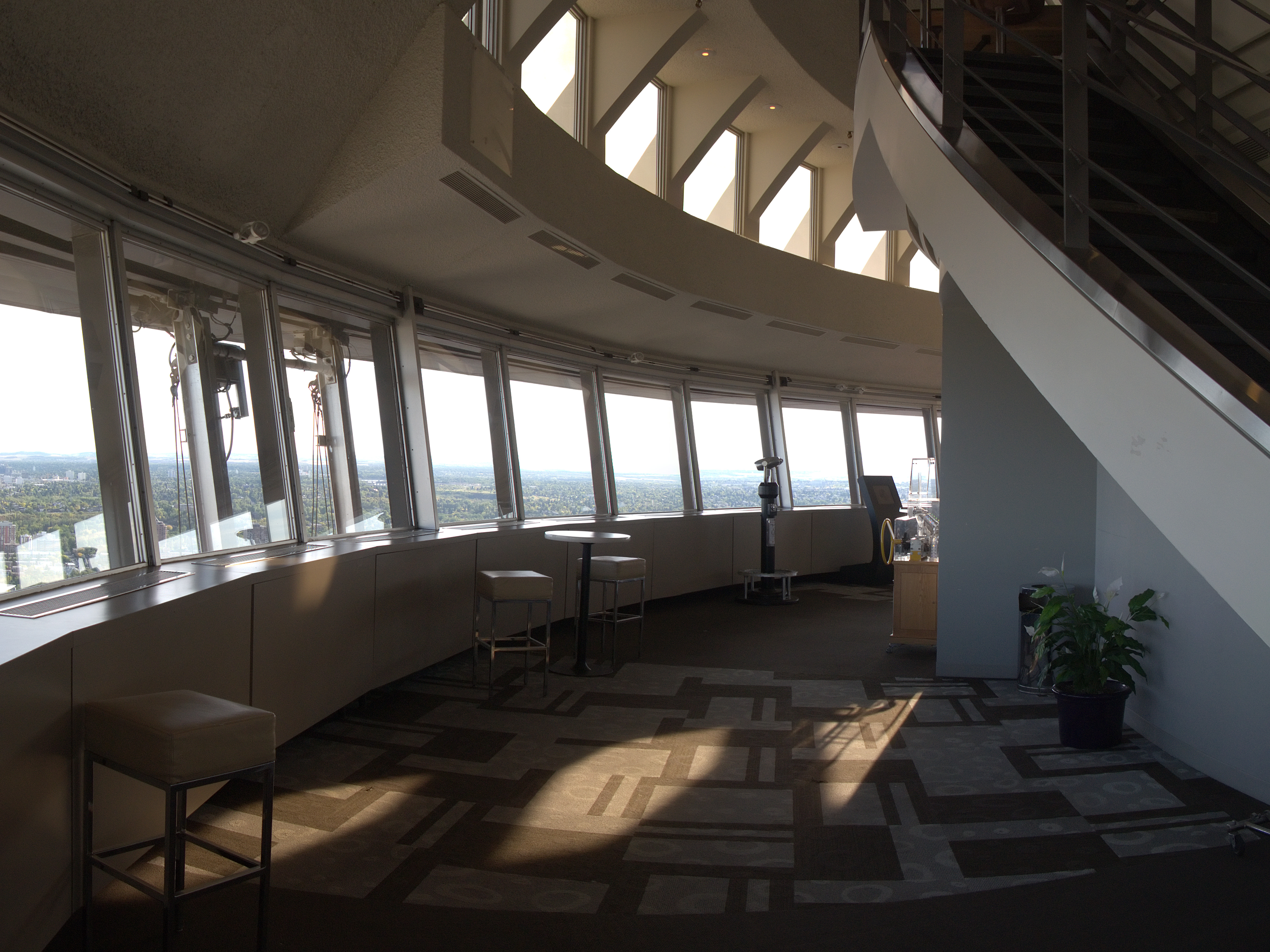
South portion of the observation deck

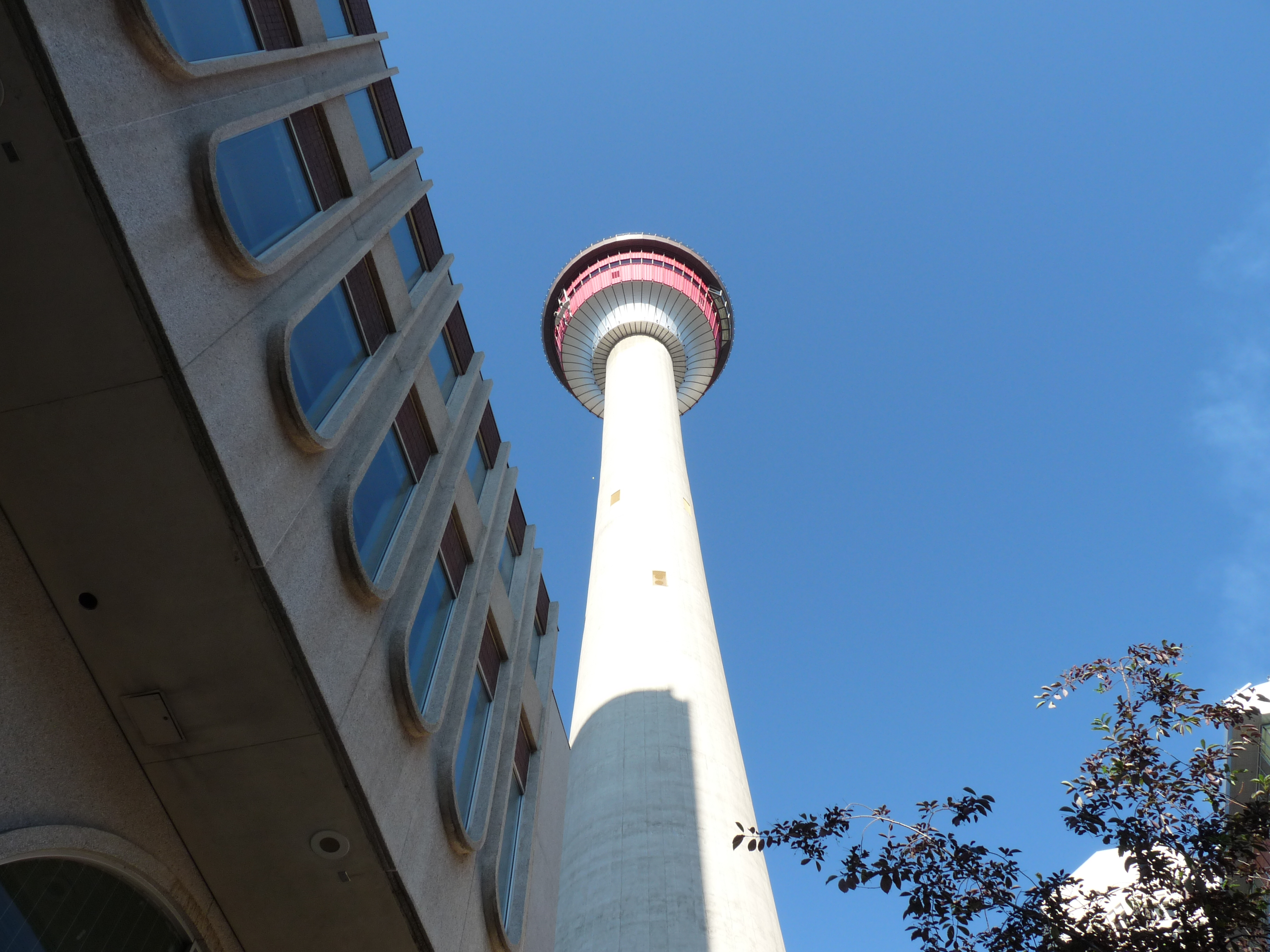
Tower from below.

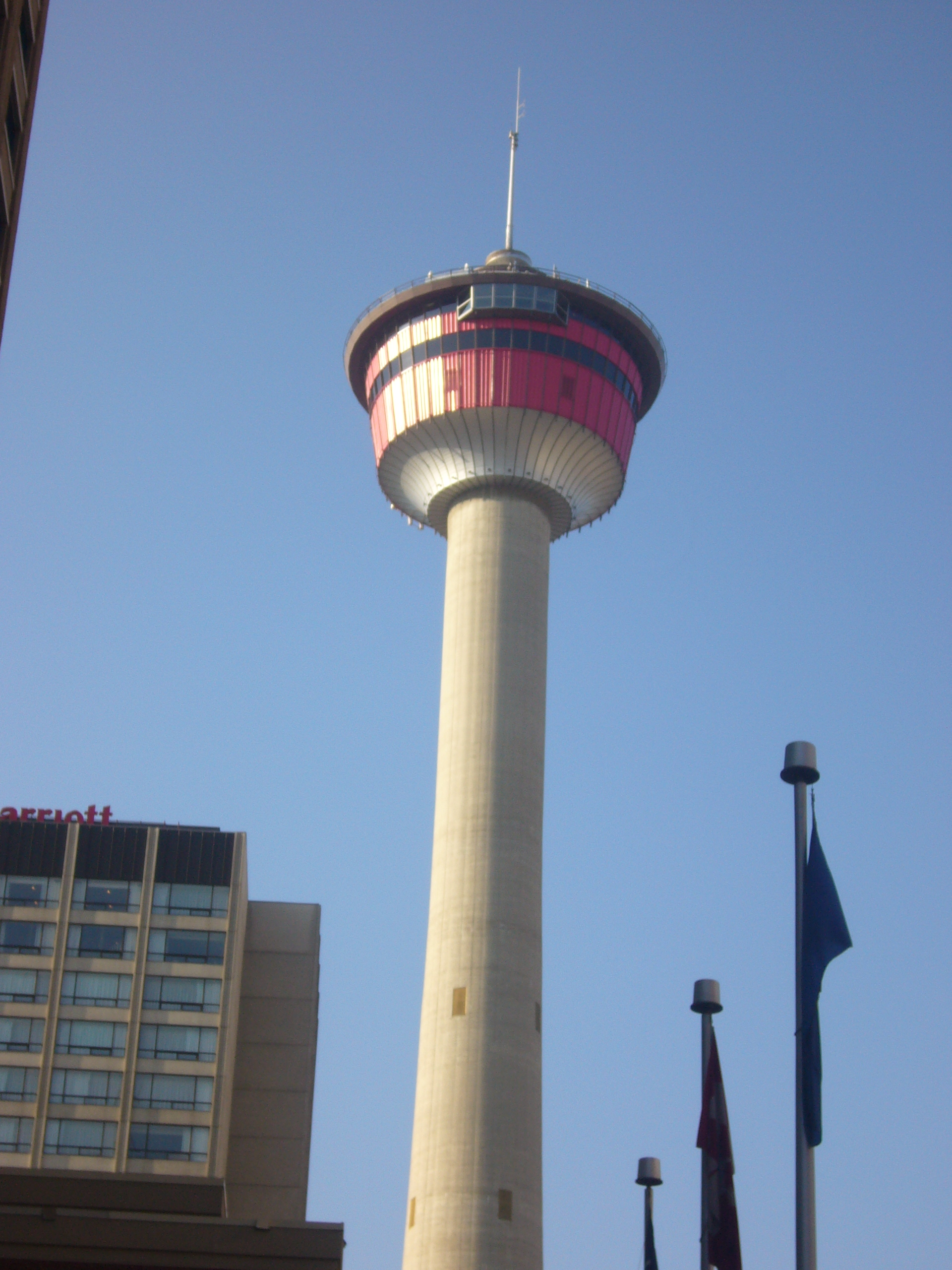
Calgary Tower in August 2007

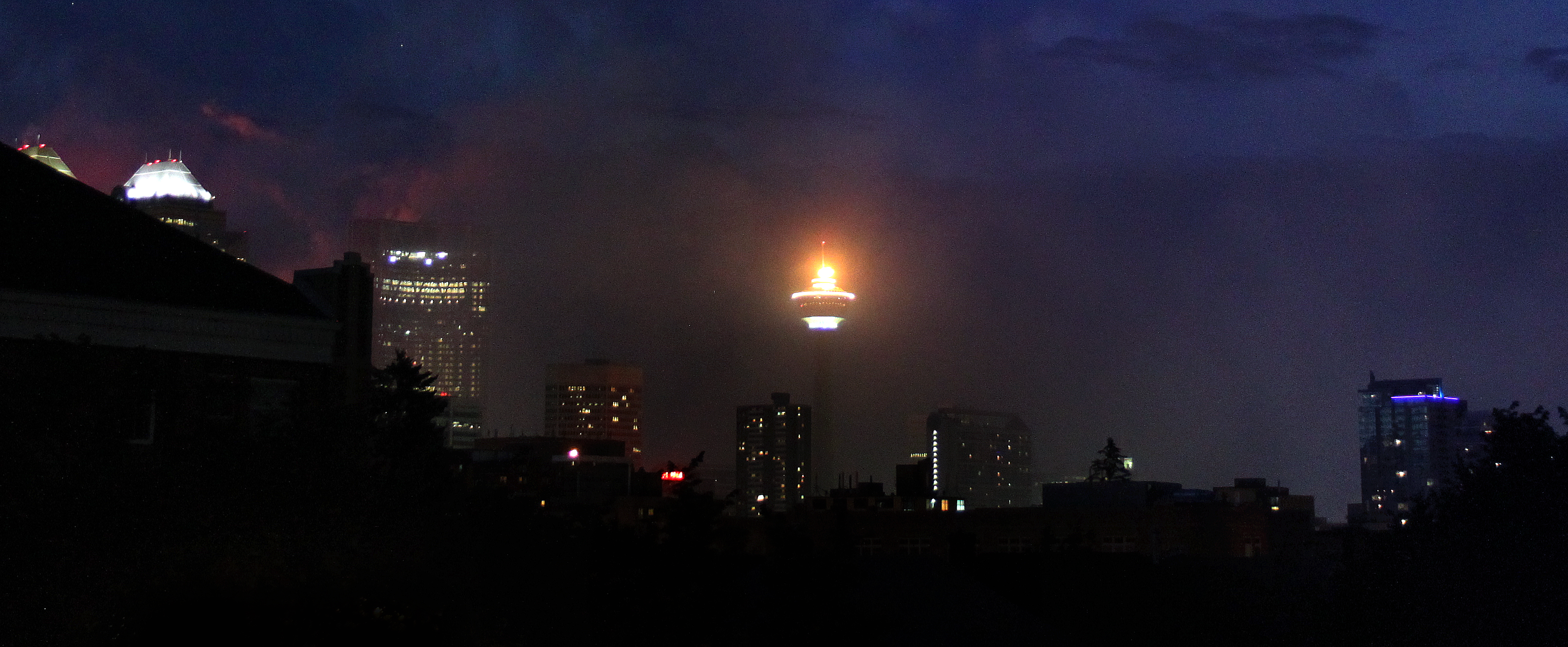
Calgary Tower – With flame lit. Canada Day at dusk, 2012
