= Brookfield Place (Calgary) =

Skyscraper located in downtown Calgary, Alberta, Canada

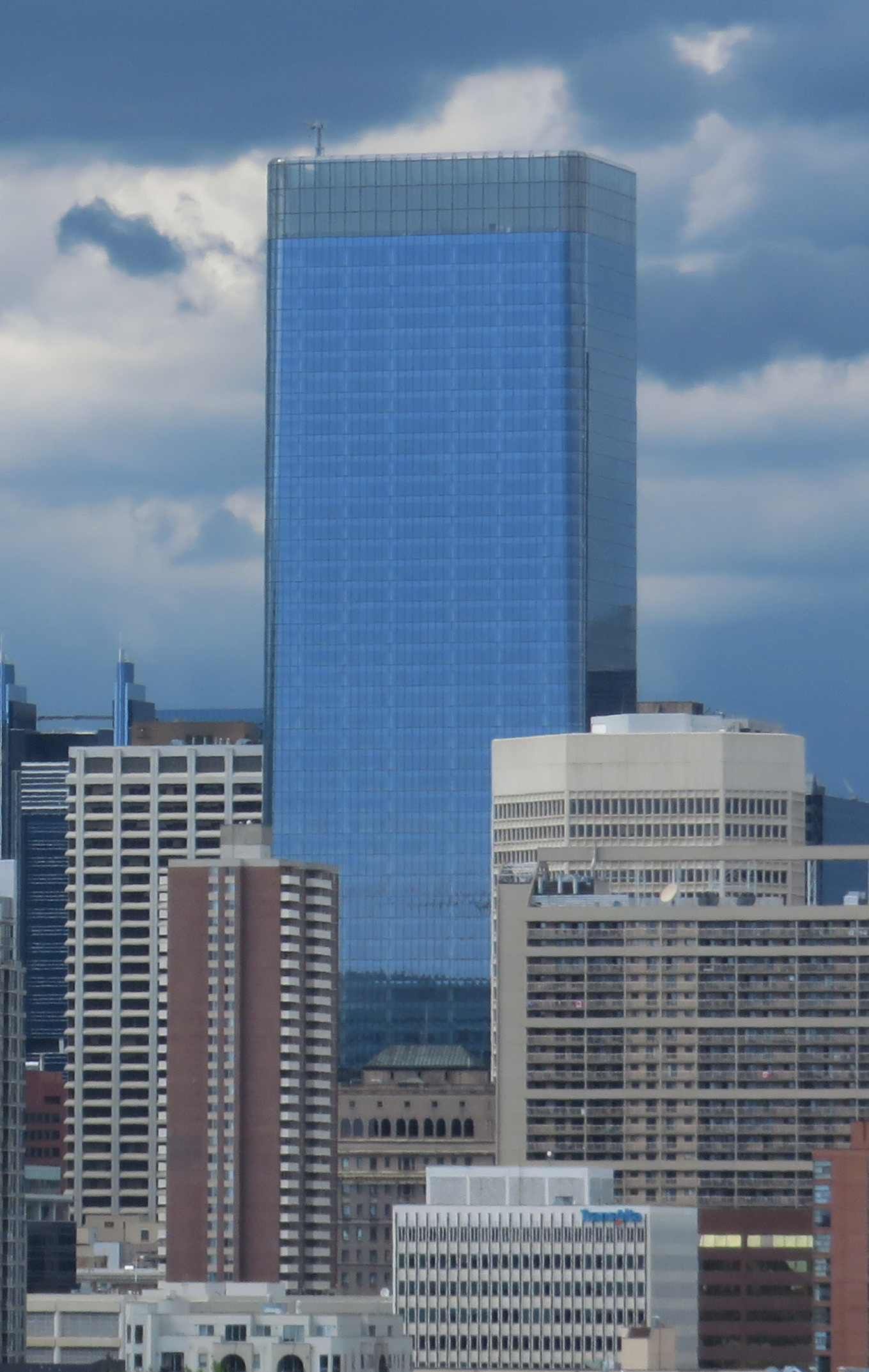
- Brookfield Place from the south in July 2017
- Interactive map of the Brookfield Place area

General information
- Type: Office
- Location: 225 6 Avenue SW, Calgary, Alberta, Canada
- Coordinates: 51.0470°N 114.0661°W
- Groundbreaking: October 29, 2013
- Opened: 2017
- Owner: Brookfield Properties

Height
- Roof: 247 m (810 ft) (East)

Technical details
- Floor count: 56 (East)
- Floor area: 130,000 square metres (1.4 million square feet)

Design and construction
- Architect: Arney Fender Katsalidis
- Architecture firm: Dialog
- Developer: Brookfield Properties

Website
- marketplace.vts.com/building/brookfield-place-calgary--225-6-avenue-southwest-calgary-ab

Brookfield Place is a skyscraper located in downtown Calgary, Alberta, Canada. The complex is home to Brookfield Place East, a 56-storey, 247-metre-high (810-foot) office tower, which, upon its completion in 2017, became the tallest building in Calgary, exceeding The Bow. Its anchor tenant is the oil and gas company Cenovus.

The commercial complex between 1st and 2nd Streets and 6th and 7th Avenues SW in downtown Calgary, was originally imagined as a full-block development with a 56-storey East and 41-storey West office tower, the project has since been scaled back with groundbreaking indefinitely delayed for the West tower.

== Construction ==
The Brookfield Place complex was designed by London and Toronto-based architecture firm Arney Fender Katsalidis. The delivery architect was Calgary based Dialog. The original name for the site was "225 Sixth", which was later changed to Brookfield Place. The design would feature a three-storey, 50,000 square foot transparent glass pavilion connected to the City's Plus 15 pedway system, a winter garden, and numerous sustainable design features such as storm-water management and auto sharing, car pooling and electric plug-in parking facilities.

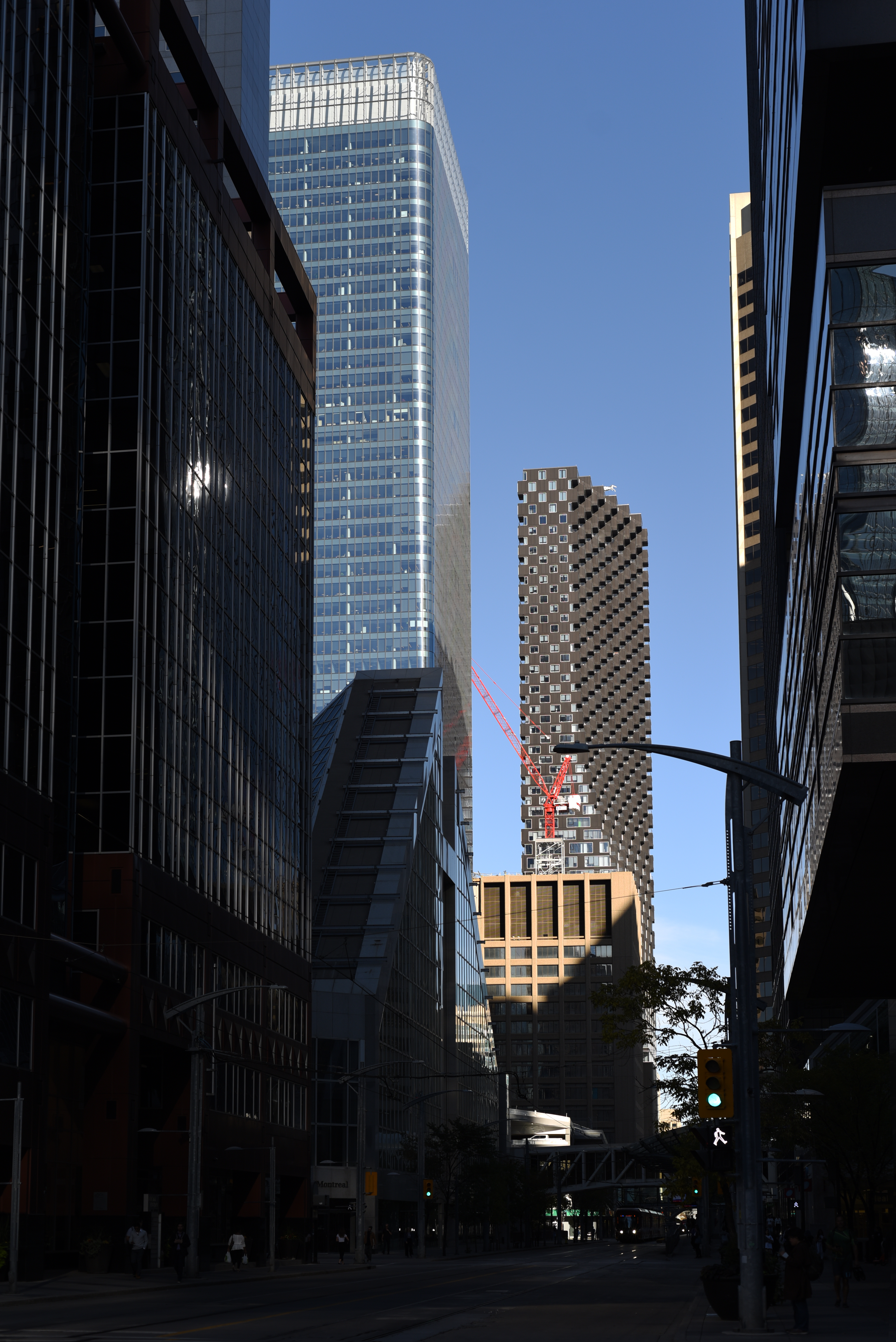
Brookfield Place and Telus Sky

Groundbreaking for the complex took place on October 29, 2013, which was attended by Calgary Mayor Naheed Nenshi. On May 11, 2016, Brookfield Place East reached 247 metres, exceeding The Bow and becoming the tallest building in Calgary.

The development is constructed to LEED Gold standard for Core and Shell. Commuters have direct access to the Plus 15 skywalk system and the CTrain LRT system on 7th Avenue.

=== Glass window failures ===
In October 2017 Brookfield Place East experienced two separate window failures, the first occurring on October 15 when high wind caused window-washing equipment to strike the northeast facade causing a panel from the 51st floor to break. The second incident on October 29 saw a panel from the 23rd floor break, causing shards of glass to fall on the street below.

== See also ==
- List of tallest buildings in Calgary

Preceded by The Bow	Tallest building in Calgary; 2017-present 247 m	Succeeded by Incumbent
