= BOW =

BOW as an acronym may refer to:

- Bag of waters, amniotic sac
- Bartow Municipal Airport (IATA:BOW), a public use airport near Bartow, Florida, United States
- Basic operating weight of an aircraft
- BOW counties, made of Brown, Outagamie, and Winnebago counties in Wisconsin
- B.O.W. (born 1970), Finnish rapper

== See also ==
- Bow (disambiguation)
