= Dubeau =

Dubeau is a surname. Notable people with the surname include:

- Angèle Dubeau (born 1962), Canadian retired classical violinist
- Dan Dubeau, chief human resources officer, deputy commissioner and former acting commissioner of the Royal Canadian Mounted Police (2017–2018)
- Ernie Dubeau (1882–1951), Canadian ice hockey player
- Joseph Adélard Dubeau (1873–1937), Canadian politician
- Philippe Dubeau (born 1948), French classical organist and politician, former mayor of the commune of Pageas
