= Beau (poem) =

1989 poem written by James Stewart

- by James Stewart
- First published in: Jimmy Stewart and his Poems
- Illustrator: Cheryl Gross
- Country: US
- Language: English
- Publisher: Crown Publishers
- Publication date: 1989
- Media type: Hardback
- ISBN: 978-0-517-57382-2

"Beau", also known as "I’ll Never Forget a Dog Named Beau", is a poem written by American film and stage actor James Stewart. A tribute to Stewart's deceased pet dog, the poem was first recited on The Tonight Show Starring Johnny Carson in 1981, and later published in the 1989 collection Jimmy Stewart and his Poems.

== Background ==
James Stewart owned a "willful but beloved" Golden Retriever named Beau, of whom he was extremely fond. Beau slept in the corner of Stewart's bedroom, but would often crawl onto the bed between Stewart and his wife Gloria. Stewart recalled, "he was up there because he wanted me to pat his head, so that’s what I would do. Somehow, my touching his hair made him happier, and just the feeling of him laying against me helped me sleep better."

While shooting a movie in Arizona, Stewart received a phone call from Dr. Keagy, his veterinarian, who informed him that Beau was terminally ill, and that Gloria sought his permission to perform euthanasia. Stewart declined to give a reply over the phone, and told Keagy to "keep him alive and I'll be there." Stewart requested several days' leave, which allowed him to spend some time with Beau before granting the doctor permission to euthanize the sick dog. Following the procedure, Stewart sat in his car for ten minutes to clear his eyes of tears. Stewart later remembered:

After [Beau] died there were a lot of nights when I was certain that I could feel him get into bed beside me and I would reach out and pat his head. The feeling was so real that I wrote a poem about it and how much it hurt to realize that he wasn’t going to be there any more.

== The Tonight Show Starring Johnny Carson ==
"Beau" was first recited on an episode of The Tonight Show Starring Johnny Carson on July 28, 1981. Ed McMahon later described the poem itself as "forgettable", but added that both he and Johnny Carson, a couple of "maudlin mutt mourners", were nevertheless moved to tears by Stewart's passionate delivery.
