= Mitchell Smith =

Mitchell Smith may refer to:

- Mitchell Smith (author), American author writing crime fiction and science fiction
- Mitchell Smith (politician), American politician
- Mitchell Smith (singer), contestant on season 2 of the Australian series The X Factor
