= Glen Bow =

Australian rules footballer (1935–2006)

Personal information
- Full name: Glen Bow
- Born: 12 August 1935
- Died: 26 December 2006 (aged 71)
- Original team: Norseman
- Height: 185 cm (6 ft 1 in)
- Weight: 86 kg (190 lb)

Playing career^{1}
| Years | Club | Games (Goals) |
| 1954–56 | Geelong | 14 (3) |
- ^{1} Playing statistics correct to the end of 1956.

Glen Bow (12 August 1935 – 26 December 2006) was an Australian rules footballer who played with Geelong in the Victorian Football League (VFL).
