= Lily Lawrence Bow Library =

Library in Homestead, Florida

The Lily Lawrence Bow Library is a historic library in Homestead, Florida. It is located 212 Northwest 1st Avenue. On August 5, 1996, it was added to the U.S. National Register of Historic Places. It was named after Lily Lawrence Bow, Homestead's first librarian.

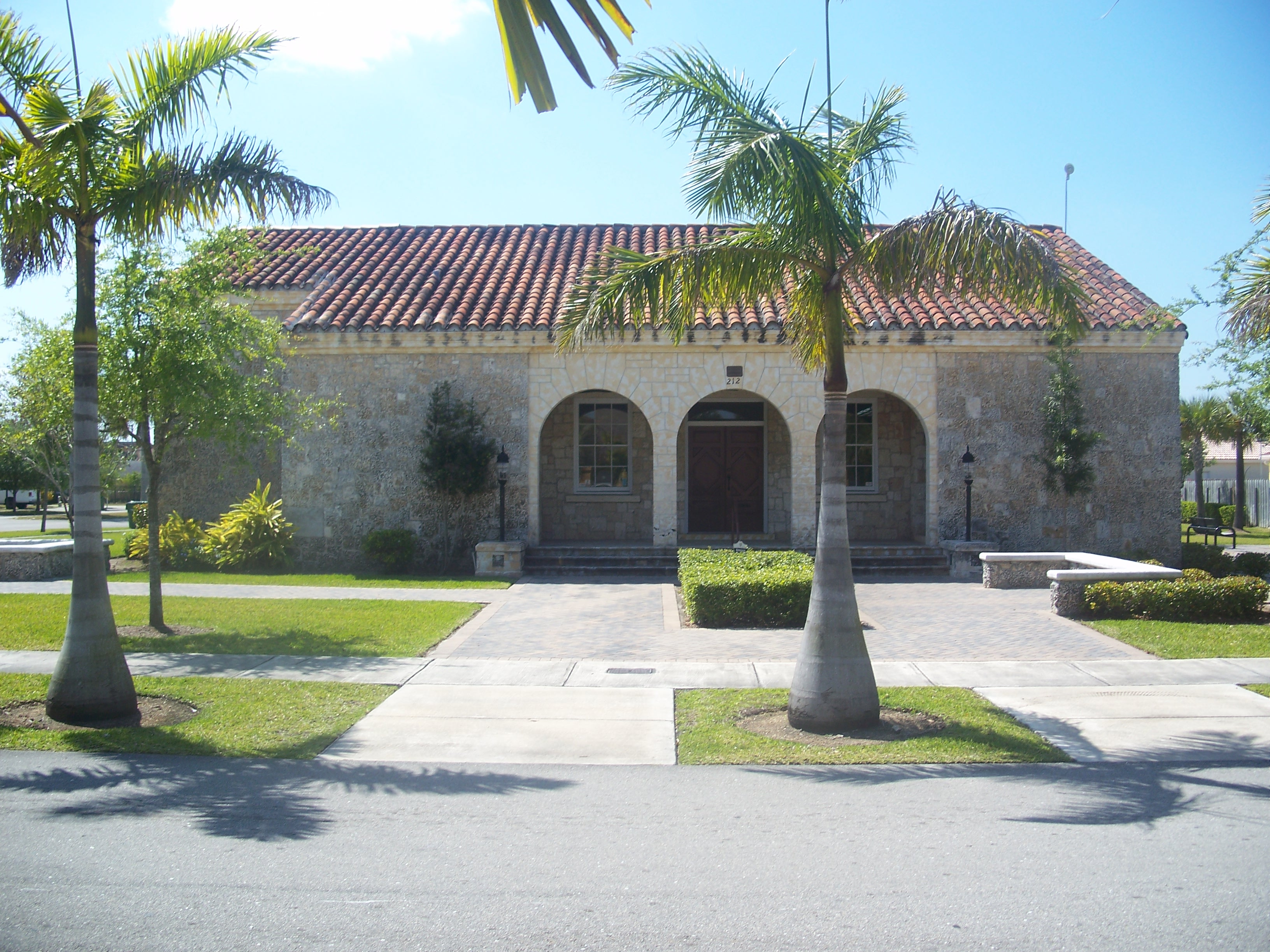
The Lily Lawrence Bow Library

== Lily Lawrence Bow ==
Lily Lawrence Bow was born in 1870. She was a college educated woman who loved the outdoors and was married to Richard Bow who, it seems, was an alcoholic. Originally from Chicago but having learned that it was possible to make a living growing limes and cotton in the Florida Keys, Bow convinced her husband to move to Cudjoe Key in 1904 with their two sons (14 and 4) and start a new life together. There they purchased 207 acres of hardwood hammock, salt ponds, and lime trees. At that time Cudjoe Key was very desolate and remote. The nearest town was Key West, a 20-mile sailboat ride away. The residents numbered just a few families who scratched out a living by making charcoal. The railroad hadn't been built yet.

Richard Bow did not last long in this new farmer's life. Just a few short months after arriving in Cudjoe Richard left his family behind. Before leaving he transferred the property title to Lily. To survive Bow planted melons, pineapples, yams, tomatoes, and limes while her sons fished and hunted deer. Since she was college educated Bow taught her sons as well as the children from a neighboring family from Sugarloaf Key. The family would pay her with meat and vegetables. Surprisingly Bow had an upright piano in her one-room cabin.

The Florida Eastcoast Railway began conducting survey work in 1906. One of the engineers, William Krome, befriended Bow and strongly urged her to leave the area. Many railroad workers would be arriving soon and he was worried for her safety and that of her sons. Initially Bow did not want to leave but relented after Krome gave her sixteen-year-old son a job with the railroad. She and her family left Cudjoe in October 1906, only days before a hurricane swept through, killing over one hundred railroad workers.

In Miami she worked as a music teacher but Bow preferred the type of life she had on Cudjoe so she applied for a homestead grant in Homestead, Florida. There she built a cabin on the corner of 2nd Avenue and Avocado Drive. Bow sold citrus and raised chickens. She also wrote two poetry books: Pioneering with Pegasus and Cloth of Gold. Lily Lawrence Bow died in 1943.

== The Library ==
In 1920 the Women's Club of Homestead appointed Bow chair of their library committee, which soon became a public library. She was the first librarian in Homestead. Since the city had no position for a librarian, Bow was appointed as a policeman instead. Book donations came from Dade County and she gave books to the local schools. The library outgrew its home in the Women's Club and moved to a city-owned site.

Clarence J. Parman, a local architect, drew up plans in 1937 for the present site of what will become the Lily Lawrence Bow Library. The project was approved a year later by the Works Progress Administration (WPA). The WPA was federal program instituted by Franklin D. Roosevelt as part of the New Deal during the Great Depression. The WPA was to have a major impact on libraries and a Florida Federal Emergency Relief Act (FERA) report from March 1935 showed that thirty-one library/museum projects had been approved in 1934. In March 1941 392 people, mostly women, were employed in WPA library projects. The new building was made out of native oolitic rock and hand-hewn Dade County pine timbers. Construction was completed in 1939.

In 1939 the City Council voted to name the building the Lily Lawrence Bow Library after Homestead's first librarian, an accomplished musician, artist, published poet, and a member of the local police force. At the dedication, Senator Claude Pepper stated: "The progress of humanity is epitomized in this beautiful structure. In it is reflected the great civic pride and the desire for better things in life that fill the hearts of Homestead's citizens."
