= Beau Geste (disambiguation) =

Beau Geste is a 1924 adventure novel by P. C. Wren.

Beau Geste may also refer to:

- Beau Geste (1926 film)
- Beau Geste (1939 film)
- Beau Geste (1966 film)
- Beau Geste (TV series), a 1982 BBC television serial
- "Beau Geste" (song), a song by You Am I
- Beau Geste hypothesis, a theory why birds have elaborate song repertoires
