= Bow and warp of semiconductor wafers and substrates =

Measures of the flatness of wafers

Bow and warp of semiconductor wafers and substrates are measures of the flatness of wafers.

== Definitions ==
Bow is the deviation of the center point of the median surface of a free, un-clamped wafer from the reference plane, where the reference plane is defined by three corners of an equilateral triangle. This definition is based on now obsolete ASTM F534.

Warp is the difference between the maximum and the minimum distances of the median surface of a free, un-clamped wafer from the reference plane defined above. This definition follows ASTM F657, and ASTM F1390.

== Modifications ==
The above definitions were developed for capacitance wafer thickness gauges such as ADE 9500, and later adopted by optical gauges.

Even though these standards are currently obsolete. They were withdrawn without replacement but are still widely used for characterization of semiconductor wafers, metal and glass substrates for MEMS devices, solar cells, and many other applications.
