= Bow Creek =

Bow Creek may refer to:

in England

- Bow Creek (Devon), the estuary of the Harbourne River
- Bow Creek (London), the estuary of the River Lea

in the United States

- Bow Creek (Big Wapwallopen Creek), in Luzerne County, Pennsylvania
- Bow Creek (Swatara Creek), in Dauphin County, Pennsylvania
