= Beaux =

- Commune
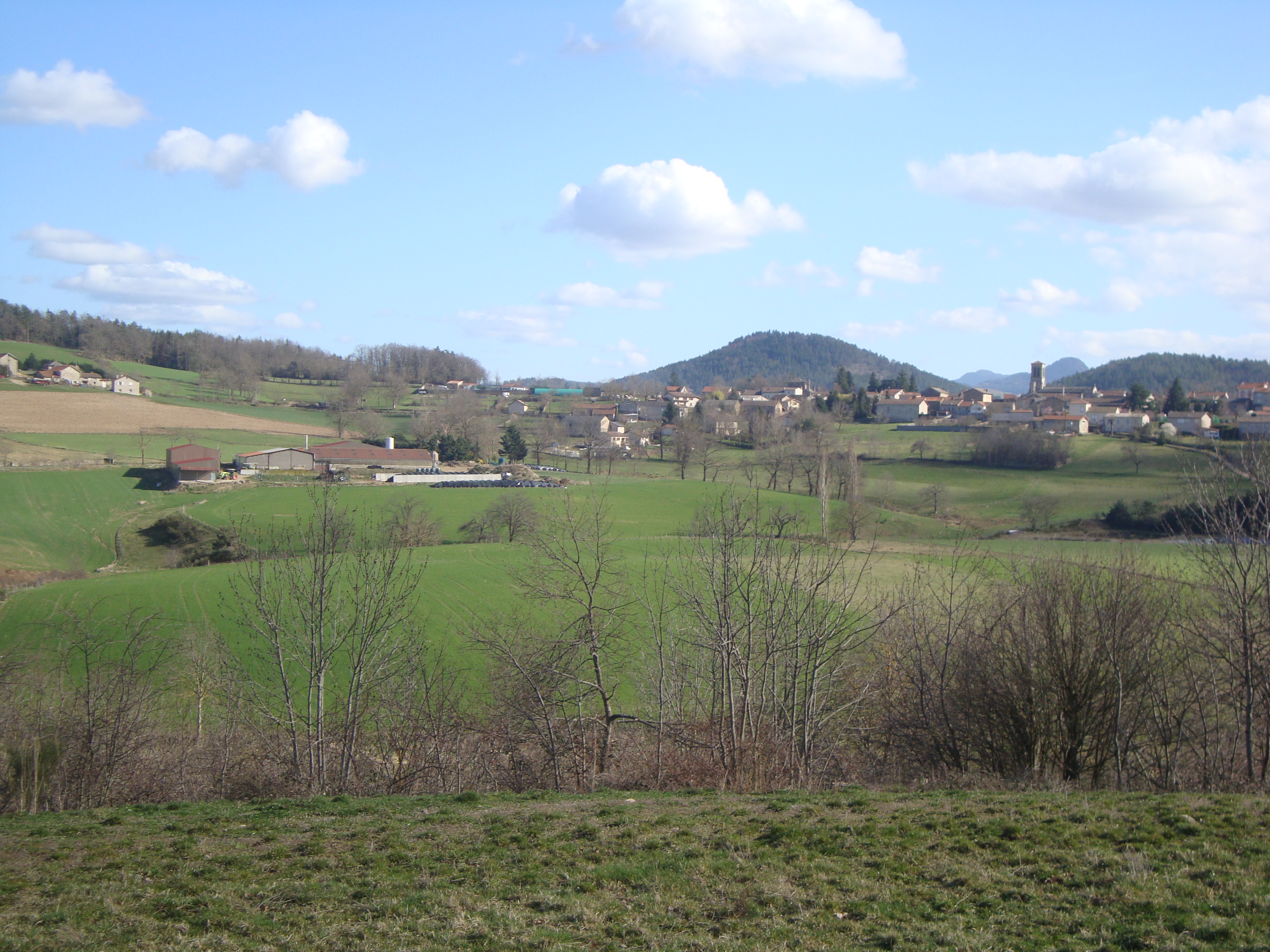
- Location of Beaux
- Location within France Location within Auvergne-Rhône-Alpes
- Coordinates: 45°11′16″N 4°05′38″E
- Country: France
- Region: Auvergne-Rhône-Alpes
- Department: Haute-Loire
- Arrondissement: Yssingeaux
- Canton: Yssingeaux

Government
  - Mayor (2020–2026): Daniel Favier
- Area^{1}: 16.78 km^{2} (6.48 sq mi)
- Elevation: 750 m (2,460 ft)
- Highest elevation: 920 m (3,020 ft)
- Lowest elevation: 475 m (1,558 ft)
- Population (2023): 886
  - Density: 52.8/km^{2} (137/sq mi)
- Time zone: UTC+01:00 (CET)
  - Summer (DST): UTC+02:00 (CEST)
- INSEE/Postal code: 43024 /43200
- ^{1} French Land Register data, which excludes lakes, ponds, glaciers > 1 km^{2} (0.386 sq mi or 247 acres) and river estuaries.

Beaux (French pronunciation: [bo]) is a commune in the Haute-Loire department in south-central France.

== Population ==
Historical population
Year	Pop.	±% p.a.
1968	659	—
1975	656	−0.07%
1982	670	+0.30%
1990	640	−0.57%
1999	646	+0.10%
2007	765	+2.14%
2012	809	+1.12%
2017	845	+0.87%
2023	886	+0.79%
Source: INSEE

== See also ==
- Communes of the Haute-Loire department
