= Malcolm Norman Bow =

Malcolm (Mac) Norman Bow (1918–2005) was a Canadian diplomat. He was born in Regina, Saskatchewan, and educated at the University of Alberta and the University of British Columbia. His father, Malcolm Ross Bow, was a medical doctor and Alberta deputy minister of health for 25 years.

During World War II Bow served with the Calgary Highlanders. He was seconded by the British and posted to Myanmar and India, eventually achieving the rank of major. Returning to Britain in 1945, Bow proposed to Betty Roberts, a British aeronautics inspector at a Lancaster bomber factory. The couple married in March of that year.

After returning to Canada, Bow worked as a journalist for the Vancouver Province and completed his undergraduate degree. In 1949 Bow joined the Department of External Affairs.

During his diplomatic career, Bow served as Chargé d'Affairs a.i. to Spain followed by Ambassador Extraordinary and Plenipotentiary to Czechoslovakia, Hungary, Cuba and Haiti. Bow considered his greatest accomplishment to be the Treaty on the Non-Proliferation of Nuclear Weapons, which he helped negotiate.

Bow and his wife had four children. Bow died in 2005 and his wife died in 2012.

Diplomatic posts
Preceded by William McKenzie Wood	Ambassador Extraordinary and Plenipotentiary to Haiti; 1974–1975	Succeeded by Wilfrid Marcel Agnès
Preceded by Kenneth Charles Brown	Ambassador Extraordinary and Plenipotentiary to Cuba; 1973–1975	Succeeded by James Edward Hyndman
Preceded by Established	Ambassador Extraordinary and Plenipotentiary to Hungary; 1965–1968	Succeeded by Thomas Blake Burrill Wainman-Wood
Preceded by John Alexander McCordick	Ambassador Extraordinary and Plenipotentiary to Czechoslovakia; 1964–1968	Succeeded by Thomas Blake Burrill Wainman-Wood
Preceded by Léon Mayrand	Chargé d'Affaires a.i. to Spain; 1958–1964	Succeeded by Jean Bruchési
