= Malcolm Ross Bow =

Canadian doctor and public health officer (1887–1982)

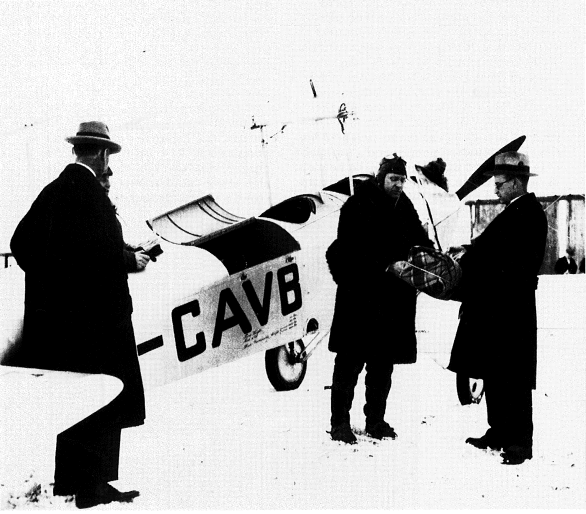
Dr. Malcolm Bow hands serum wrapped in a blanket to pilot Wop May for his 1929 mercy flight.

Malcolm Ross Bow (13 July 1887 – 5 July 1982) was a Canadian medical doctor and public health officer. From 1912 to 1926 Bow served as Chief Medical Officer for Regina, Saskatchewan. From 1927 to 1952 Bow served as deputy minister of health for Alberta.

Born in Vernon, Ontario, Bow graduated from Queen's University with a medical degree in 1911. He became the first medical officer of the city of Regina the next year. Bow initiated a number of important public health programs in Regina. He controlled typhoid with a sanitary system of galvanized steel buckets and a specialised "honeywagon" which he helped design. Bow also instituted a child-care program which reduced the city's rate of infant mortality.

Bow was also an organizer and player for the Regina Rugby Club, predecessor of the Saskatchewan Roughriders. Bow played running back and acted as secretary and treasurer for the league.

In 1927 Bow moved to Edmonton to become Alberta's deputy minister of health, a position he would hold until 1952. Bow is credited with expanding health care to remote areas of the province. In 1929 Bow requested a dangerous winter flight by bush pilot Wop May to bring diphtheria vaccine to Fort Vermilion to combat an emerging outbreak. Bow was initially criticised for the "foolhardy" risk, but the delivery was successful and the pilots were greeted as national heroes on their return to Edmonton.

From 1938 until 1954 Bow combined his administrative duties with teaching public health at the University of Alberta, becoming an associate professor and then professor emeritus in 1956.

In 1953 Bow moved north to become Chief Medical Officer of the Yukon.

Malcolm Bow and his wife Norma had two daughters and a son, diplomat Malcolm Norman Bow. Bow died in 1982 in Edmonton.

== Publications ==
- Bow, M. R. & Cook, F. T. (1935). "History of the Department of Public Health of Alberta". Canadian Public Health Journal.
