= The Bow (skyscraper) =

1,700,000-square-foot office building in downtown Calgary, Alberta, Canada

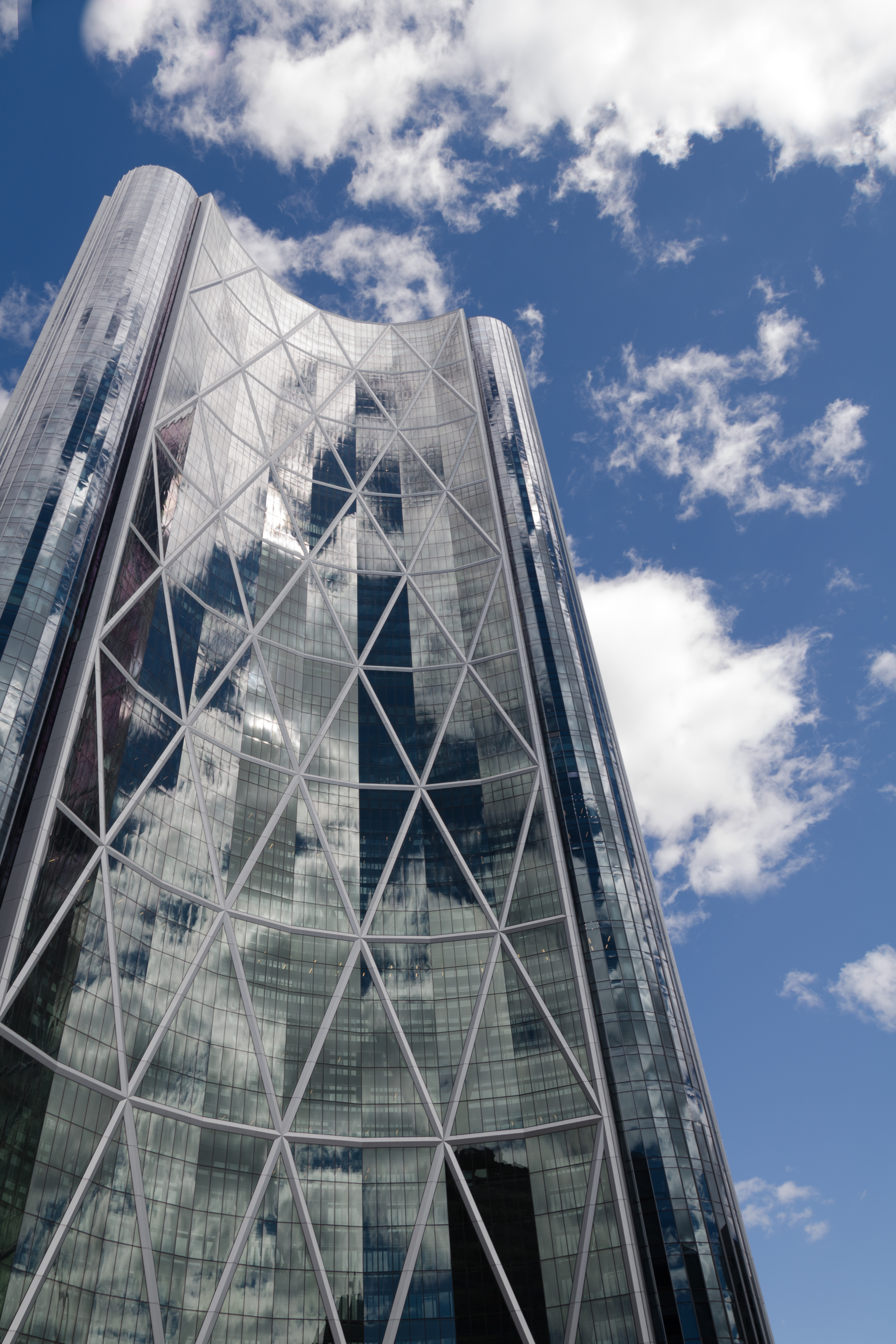
- Interactive map of the The Bow area

General information
- Status: Completed
- Type: Office
- Location: 500 Centre Street SE, Calgary, Alberta, Canada
- Coordinates: 51°02′52″N 114°03′44″W
- Construction started: June 13, 2007
- Topped-out: November 2010
- Completed: 2012
- Cost: $1.4 billion CAD
- Owner: Oak Street Real Estate Capital

Height
- Roof: 236 m (774 ft)

Technical details
- Floor count: 58 floors 53 office floors 2 retail floors 4 mechanical floors 3 sky gardens
- Floor area: 2,150,425 sq ft (199,781.0 m^{2})

Design and construction
- Architects: Foster + Partners, Zeidler Partnership Architects
- Developer: Matthews Southwest
- Structural engineer: Halcrow Yolles
- Main contractor: Ledcor Group of Companies

Website
- www.the-bow.com (unofficial)

The Bow is a 158,000-square-metre (1,700,000 sq ft) skyscraper in Downtown Calgary, Alberta, Canada. The 236-metre (774 ft) building was the tallest in Calgary between July 8, 2010, when it surpassed the Suncor Energy Centre, and May 11, 2016, when it was exceeded by Brookfield Place. The Bow is currently the second-tallest office tower in Calgary and the third-tallest in Canada outside Toronto, Ontario. The Bow is also considered the start of redevelopment in Calgary's Downtown East Village. It was completed in 2012 and was ranked among the top 10 architectural projects in the world of that year according to Azure magazine. It was built for oil and gas company Encana, and was the headquarters of its successors Ovintiv and Cenovus.

== History ==
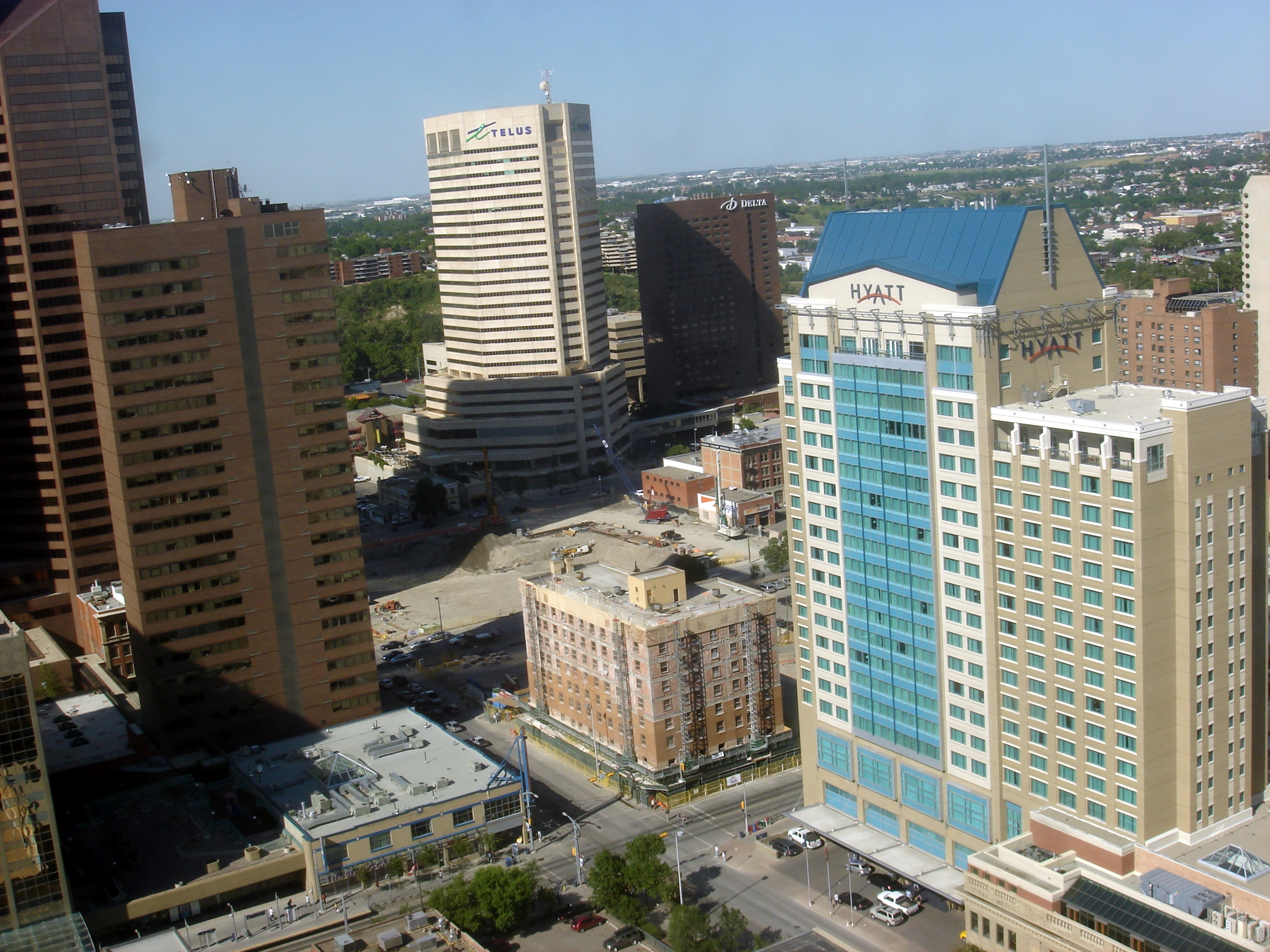
Location of The Bow before construction; the York Hotel was to be incorporated in the building complex.

=== Early plans ===
EnCana Corporation (now Ovintiv), North America's second largest natural gas producer, announced plans for the high-rise in 2006. Early designs suggested that the project would consist of a complex of towers (perhaps two or more) over two blocks. The initial proposal was for a tower of 300 m (980 ft), which would have made it the second tallest building in Canada. Early sources suggested a two tower complex spanning the entire surface of two blocks, with a second tower of 40 to 50 stories connected at sixth stories level over 6 Avenue. Official statements declared that the tower will be 58 stories, or 247 metres (810 ft) tall.

The management company in charge of the project was Texas-based Matthews Southwest, with architectural services furnished by UK-based Foster + Partners and Zeidler Partnership Architects of Calgary.

=== Announcement of The Bow ===
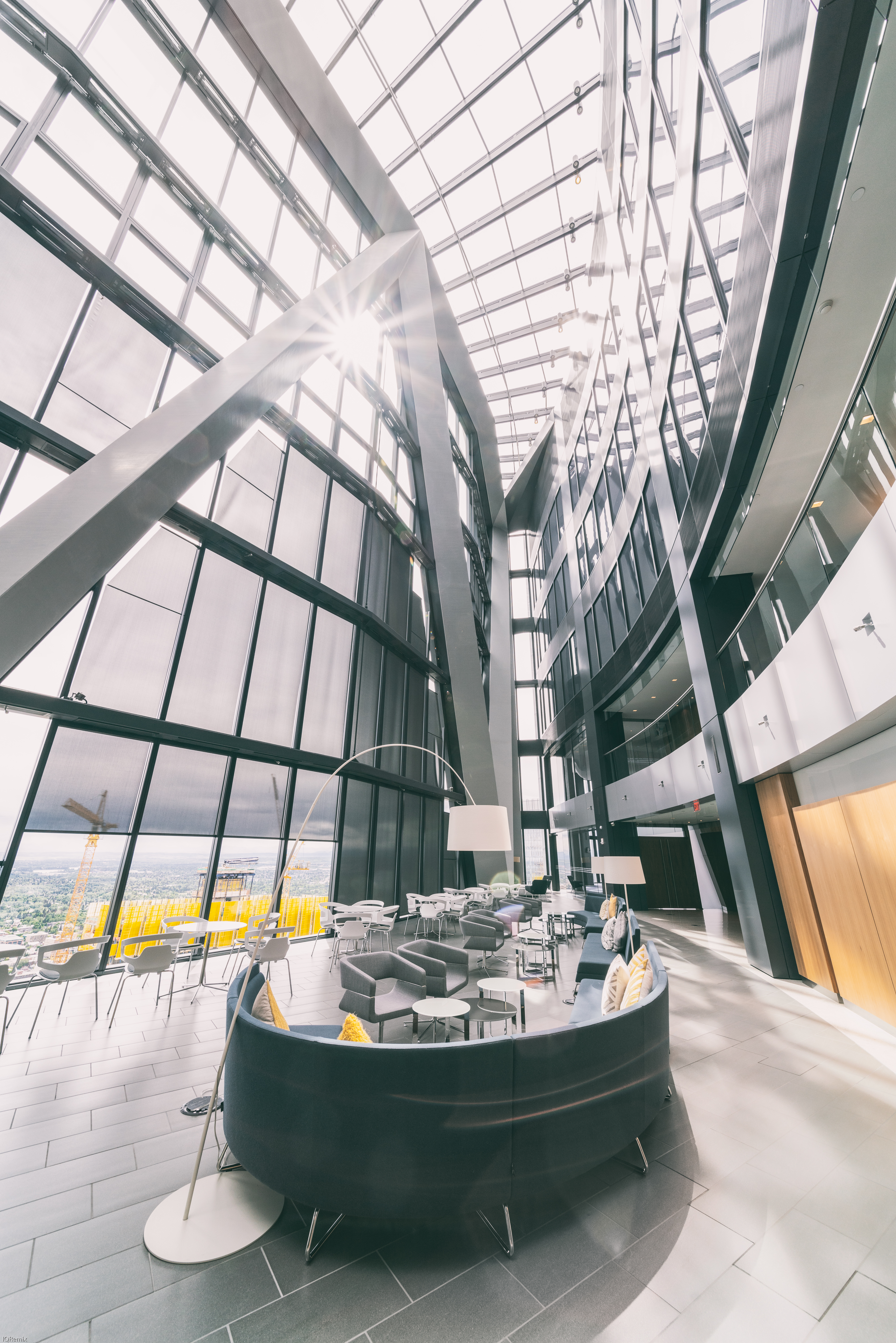
Sky high clubs at Floors 55 and 56

The project filed for development permit application is called The Bow, for its crescent shape and the view of the Bow River. On October 12, 2006, Foster + Partners revealed the first designs for the new tower. The design of The Bow takes its form from an unbuilt 1996 Foster + Partners concept for London's Millennium Tower. The final tower stands 11 meters short of the original plan after concerns were raised regarding the shadow cast upon Bow River pathways.

Encana sold The Bow office project assets to H&R Real Estate Investment Trust in 2007 for $70 million, while signing a 25-year tenant lease agreement that was to start after the project's completion. Encana expected to occupy the entire tower.

In late June 2007, the company announced that the Portrait Gallery of Canada would not be moving from Ottawa into the Bow.

=== Construction ===
Groundbreaking took place on June 13, 2007, with work starting on both sides of 6 Avenue South between Centre Street and 1st Street East. Sixth Avenue was excavated, after closure of the block (August 21, 2007) and the six level underground parkade was constructed on a two block area, on both north and south side of 6th Avenue.

A neighbouring historic building – The York Hotel, built 1929–1930 in the Edwardian Commercial Architectural style – was demolished to make room for the new building. Because of the historical significance of the York Hotel, it was important to save as much as reasonable to incorporate into the new structure. Between 70 and 80 percent of the bricks were saved and used to reconstruct two of the hotel’s exterior walls. The brown brick originally supplied by Clayburn Brick in Abbotsford and the cast-in-concrete friezes have been removed, numbered and graphed to show the original location the brick and friezes were installed on the new building in their original locations. The remainder of the building was demolished ahead of schedule by Calgary-based demolition and environmental contractor Hazco.

The concrete foundation was continuously poured over 36 hours on May 11 and 12, 2008, being the largest of its kind in Canada, and third largest in the world after the Howard Hughes Center in Los Angeles and the Sama Tower (Al Durrah Tower) in Dubai. Some 14,000 cubic metres (18,000 cu yd) of concrete filled the 3,000-square-metre (30,000 sq ft) foundation.

Erection of the above-ground steel superstructure began in October 2008 with the installation of the first of two Favelle Favco heavy-lift tower cranes.

Construction was briefly halted in December 2008 due to a $400 million shortage of financing needed to finish the job. The project continued to move forward, despite the unresolved financing issues. In April 2009, a secondary tower in the project, the 200,000-square-foot (19,000 m^{2}) building planned for a block south of the main tower, was put on hold for at least two years. The main tower, however, was set to continue, having secured the remaining $475 million required for completion of the structure.

On July 8, 2010, the Bow surpassed Suncor Energy Centre as Calgary's highest building. The 215 metres (705 ft) tall Suncor Energy Centre was the highest building in Calgary since 1984. The addition of a steel girder, part of floors 55 to 57, raised the Bow tower to 218 metres (715 ft). In November 2010 the Bow would be topped off at 234 metres.

=== Opening and use ===
The Bow officially opened in June 2013 and became the headquarters of Encana Corporation and Cenovus Energy, which had been spun-off from Encana in 2009. Cenovus was announced as anchor tenant in the proposed Brookfield Place in August 2013, and completed the move to Brookfield Place in 2019. Also in 2019, Encana announced it would be renamed to Ovintiv and would move its corporate headquarters to Denver, Colorado.

== Public art ==
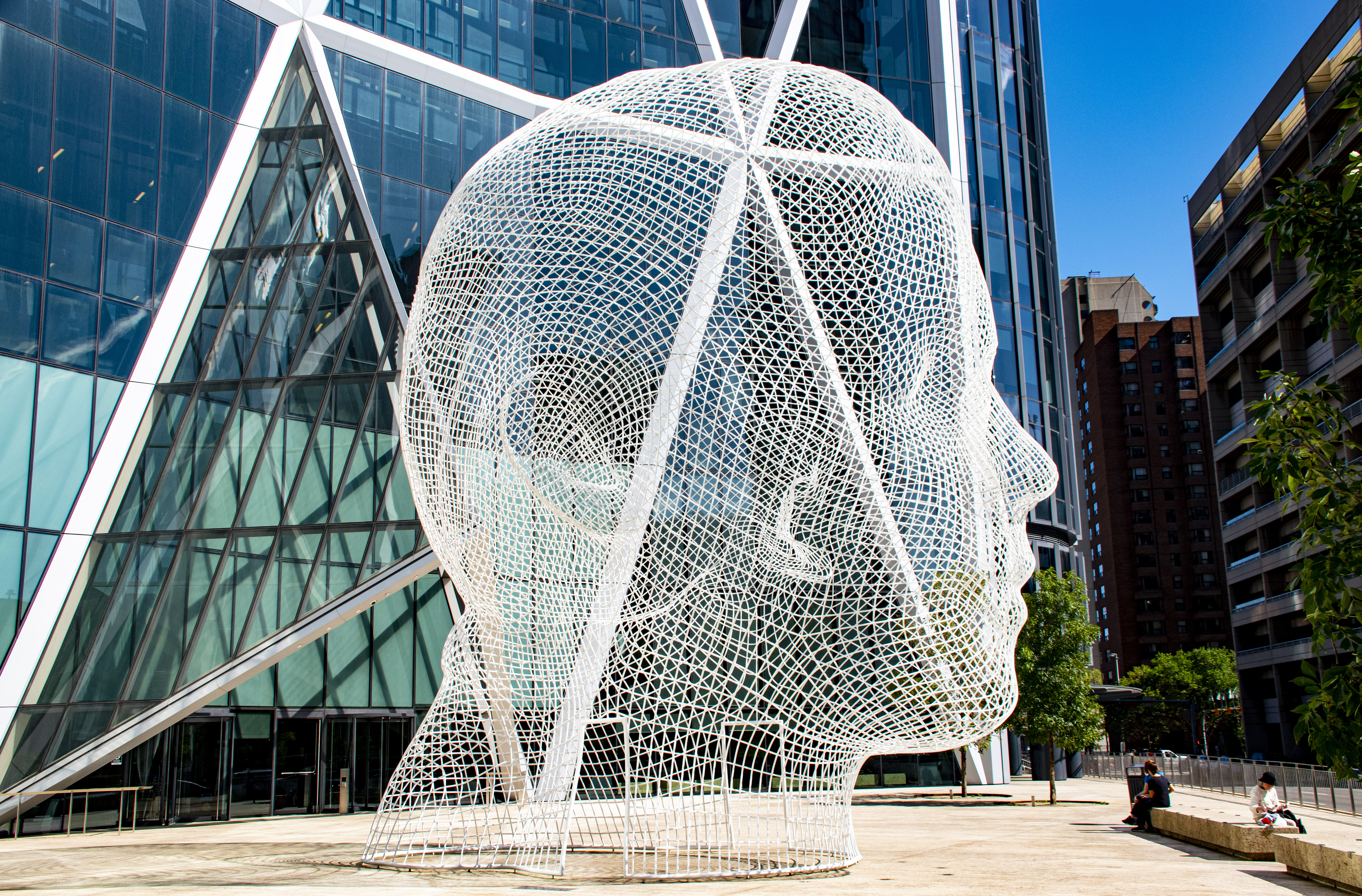
Wonderland Sculpture located at the entrance of the building

Encana officially confirmed on June 16, 2008, that Jaume Plensa, an artist most famous for the Crown Fountain in Chicago, had been chosen to complete two major public art installations for the project. The first work, entitled Wonderland, was unveiled in January 2013, on the south plaza. The second work, entitled Alberta's Dream is located on the north side and depicts a bronze casting of the artist embracing a living tree.

There is not a public observation deck. Floors 54 and 55 are home to the private meeting, lounges, conference center and sky high clubs.

== Building details ==
- Height: 237 metres (778 ft)
- 58 stories
  - 2 retail floors - 200,000 square feet (19,000 m^{2})
  - 3 floors - sky gardens, spaced approximately every 18 floors (sky lobbies), served by express elevators
  - 53 office floors - 1,700,000 square feet (160,000 m^{2})
  - 4 mechanical floors
  - In total over 84,000 square metres (900,000 sq ft) of glass
- Footprint: 190,000 square feet (18,000 m^{2})
- Parking: 1,400 parking stalls (6 level parkade, spanning two blocks on both sides of 6th Avenue)
- +15 skywalk connections to neighbouring buildings (First Tower, Suncor Energy Centre)

== See also ==
- List of tallest buildings in Calgary

Preceded by Suncor Energy Centre	Tallest building in Calgary; 2010-2017; 236 m	Succeeded by Brookfield Place
