= Forest Hill station (Toronto) =

Toronto subway station

Forest Hill
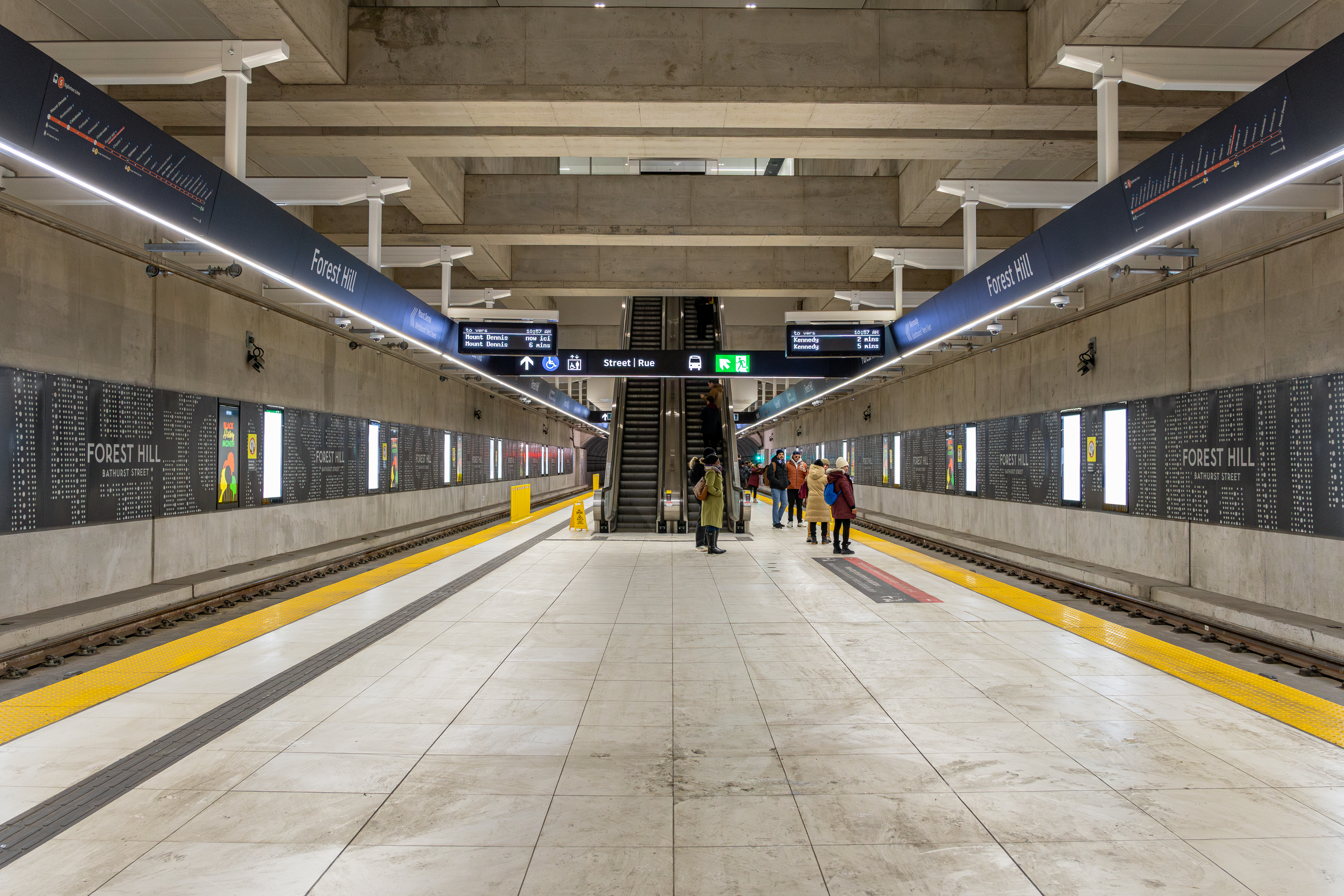
- Forest Hill station platform

General information
- Location: 842 Eglinton Avenue West; Toronto, Ontario; Canada
- Coordinates: 43°42′04″N 79°25′31″W
- Owner: Metrolinx
- Platforms: Centre platform
- Tracks: 2
- Connections: TTC buses: 7 Bathurst; 33 Forest Hill; 34 Eglinton; 307 Bathurst; 334 Eglinton

Construction
- Structure type: Underground
- Accessible: Yes
- Architect: Dialog and Arcadis

History
- Opened: February 8, 2026; 9 months ago

Services
Preceding station	Toronto Transit Commission	Following station
Cedarvale towards Mount Dennis	Line 5 Eglinton	Chaplin towards Kennedy
Location

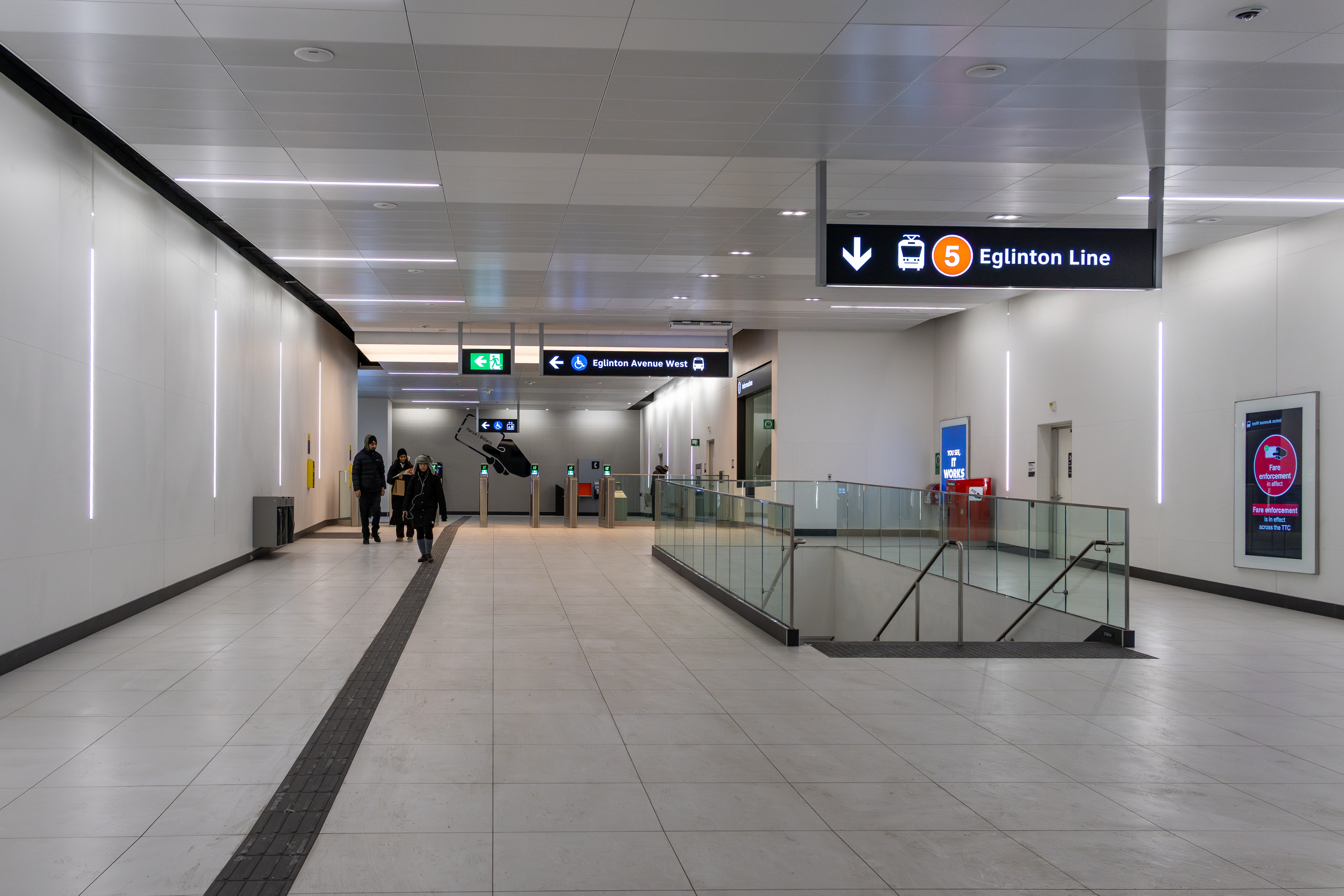
Concourse

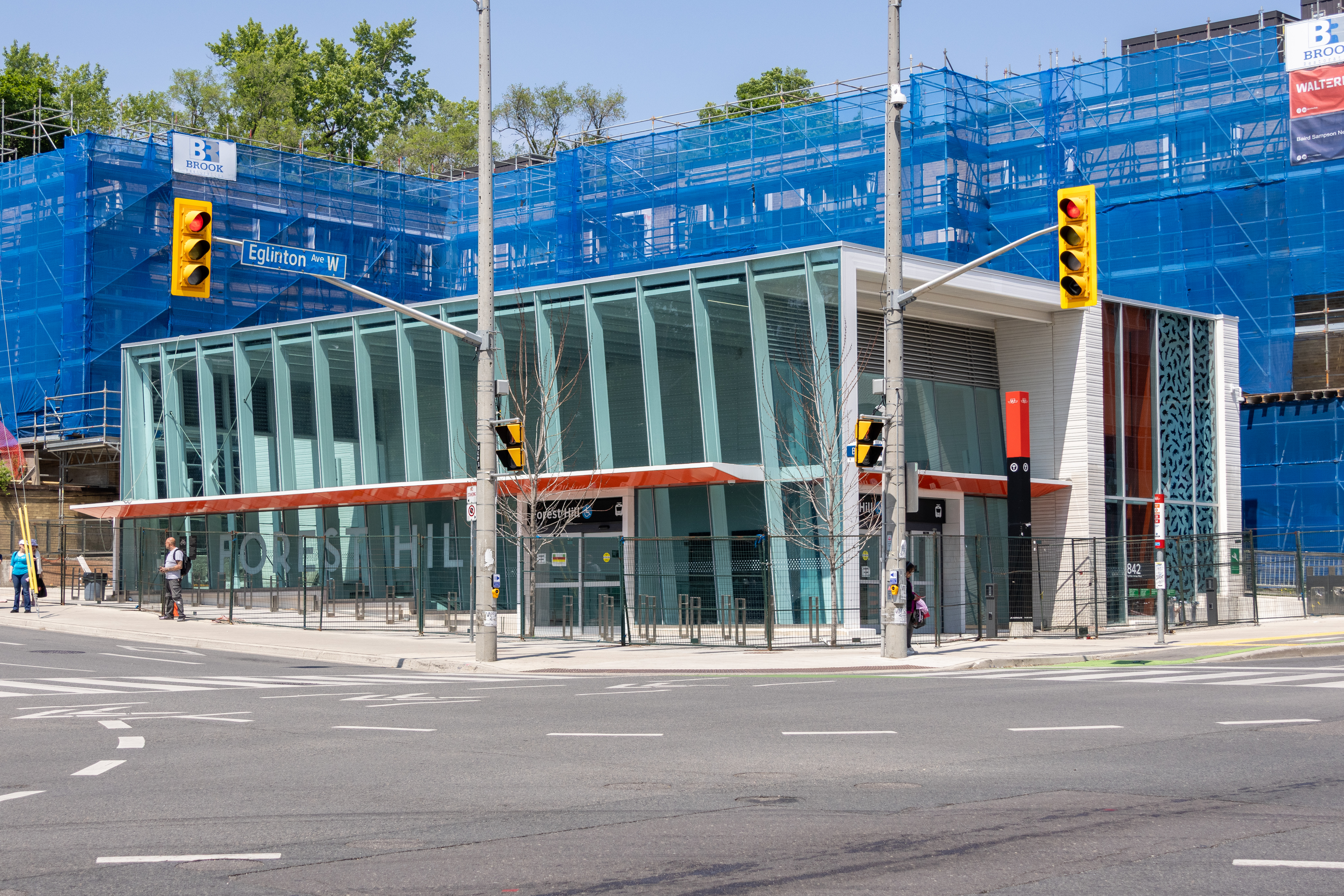
Main entrance prior to opening, June 2025

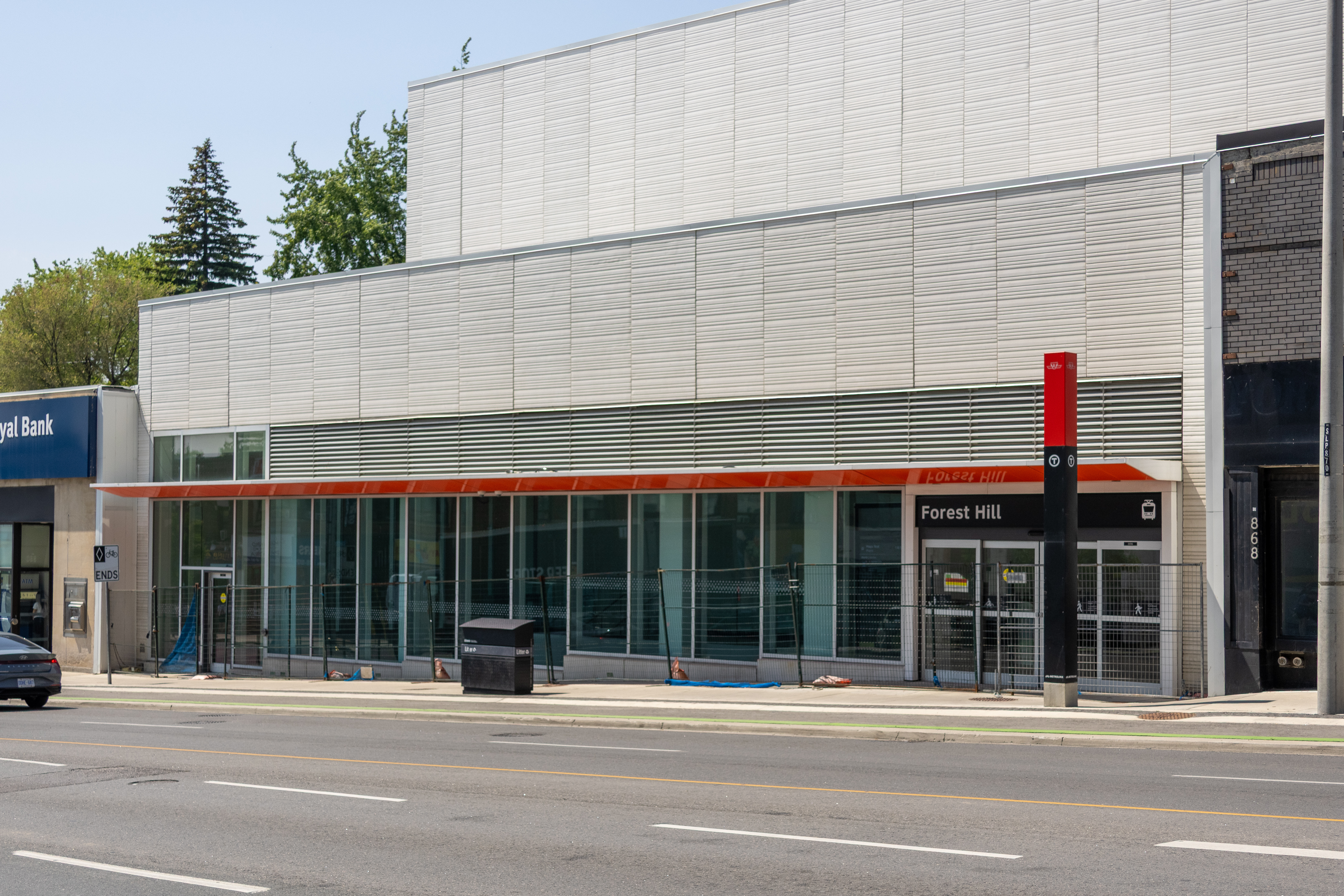
Secondary entrance on Eglinton Avenue West

Forest Hill is an underground Toronto subway station on Line 5 Eglinton in Toronto, Ontario, Canada. It is located in the Forest Hill neighbourhood at the intersection of Bathurst Street and Eglinton Avenue.

The station has two entrances. The main entrance is at the northeast corner of Eglinton Avenue West and Bathurst Street and is fully accessible. The secondary entrance is on the north side of Eglinton about 50 m (160 ft) west of Bathurst Street, opposite Peveril Hill, and will include retail spaces at street level. On-street connections will be available for TTC buses. There are 60 exterior spaces for bicycles. The secondary entrance building also houses a traction power substation.

== Station naming ==
During the planning stages for Line 5 Eglinton, the station was given the working name Bathurst, which is identical to the pre-existing Bathurst station on Line 2 Bloor–Danforth. In 2015, a report to the TTC Board recommended giving a unique name to each station in the subway system (including Line 5 Eglinton). As the station was located in the Forest Hill neighbourhood, the alternate name of Forest Hill was chosen.

== Construction ==
A small plaza at the northeast corner of the Eglinton and Bathurst intersection, that used to house several businesses including a coffee shop and convenience store, was demolished to make way for the main station entrance. At 874–876 Eglinton Avenue West, three storefronts were demolished to build the secondary entrance building. One of these businesses, the House of Chan, a Chinese-Canadian restaurant, was a local landmark that needed to relocate.

After completion of construction of the station headwalls, restoration of the roadway on Bathurst Street began on August 16, 2015.

On April 18, 2016, a scaffold erected across the face of the future secondary entrance collapsed, injuring seven people (three seriously). The collapsed structure was the façade of the former location of House of Chan, which was relocated eastwards along Eglinton Avenue to the west of Avenue Road.

== Architecture and artwork ==
The station was designed by Dialog and Arcadis, following an architectural concept designed by architects gh3* from Toronto and Daoust Lestage Lizotte Stecker from Montreal. As with other stations on Line 5, architectural features include natural light from large windows and skylights, steel structures painted white, and orange accents (the colour of the line).

Avenue station features the artwork a bird in the hand by artist Vanessa Maltese, with birds screenprinted on a window at street level.

== Surface connections ==
The following bus routes serve Forest Hill station:

Route	Name	Additional information
7	Bathurst	Northbound to Steeles Avenue West and southbound to Bathurst station
33	Forest Hill	Southbound to St. Clair West station
34	Eglinton	Westbound to Mount Dennis station and eastbound to Kennedy station
307	Bathurst	Blue Night service; Northbound to Steeles Avenue West and southbound to Exhibition Loop
334A	Eglinton	Blue Night service; eastbound to Kennedy station and westbound to Renforth Drive and Pearson Airport
334B	Eglinton	Blue Night service; eastbound to Finch Avenue East and Neilson Road via Morningside Avenue and westbound to Mount Dennis station
