= Avenue station =

Toronto subway station

Avenue
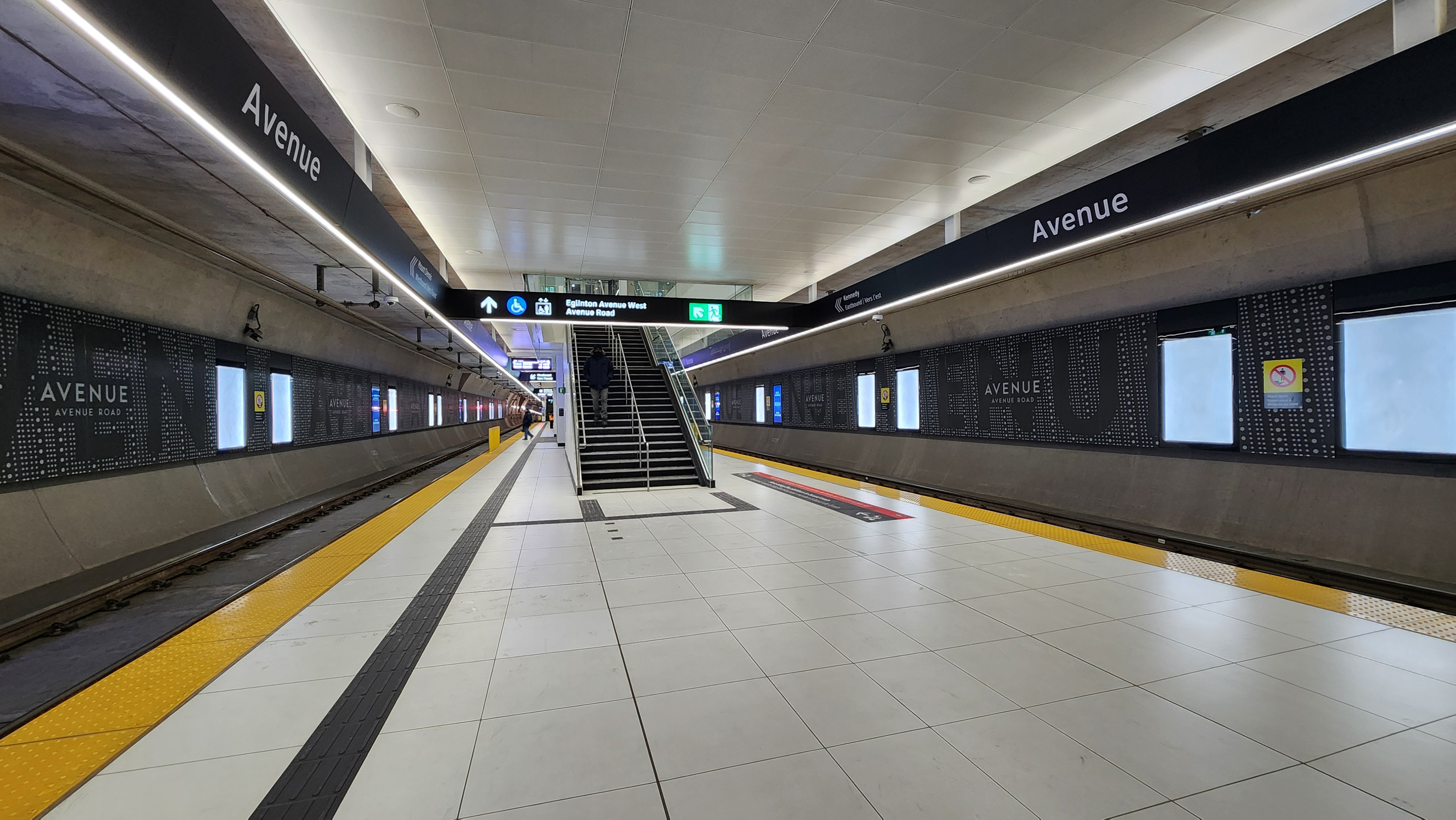
- Avenue station platform

General information
- Location: 340 Eglinton Avenue West; Toronto, Ontario; Canada
- Coordinates: 43°42′17″N 79°24′28″W
- Owner: Metrolinx
- Platforms: Centre platform
- Tracks: 2
- Connections: TTC buses: 13 Avenue Rd; 34 Eglinton; 61 Avenue Rd North; 334 Eglinton

Construction
- Structure type: Underground
- Depth: 32 metres (105 ft)
- Accessible: Yes
- Architect: Dialog and Arcadis

History
- Opened: February 8, 2026; 9 months ago

Services
| Preceding station | Toronto Transit Commission | Following station |
|---|---|---|
| Chaplin towards Mount Dennis | Line 5 Eglinton | Eglinton towards Kennedy |
Location

Avenue is an underground Toronto subway station on Line 5 Eglinton in Toronto, Ontario, Canada. The station is located on Eglinton Avenue between Avenue Road and Highbourne Road. It is the deepest underground station relative to street level in the Toronto system. Destinations include the Chaplin Estates neighbourhood, Marshall McLuhan Catholic Secondary School, the Eglinton Theatre, and Eglinton Park. The station opened on February 8, 2026.

== Description ==
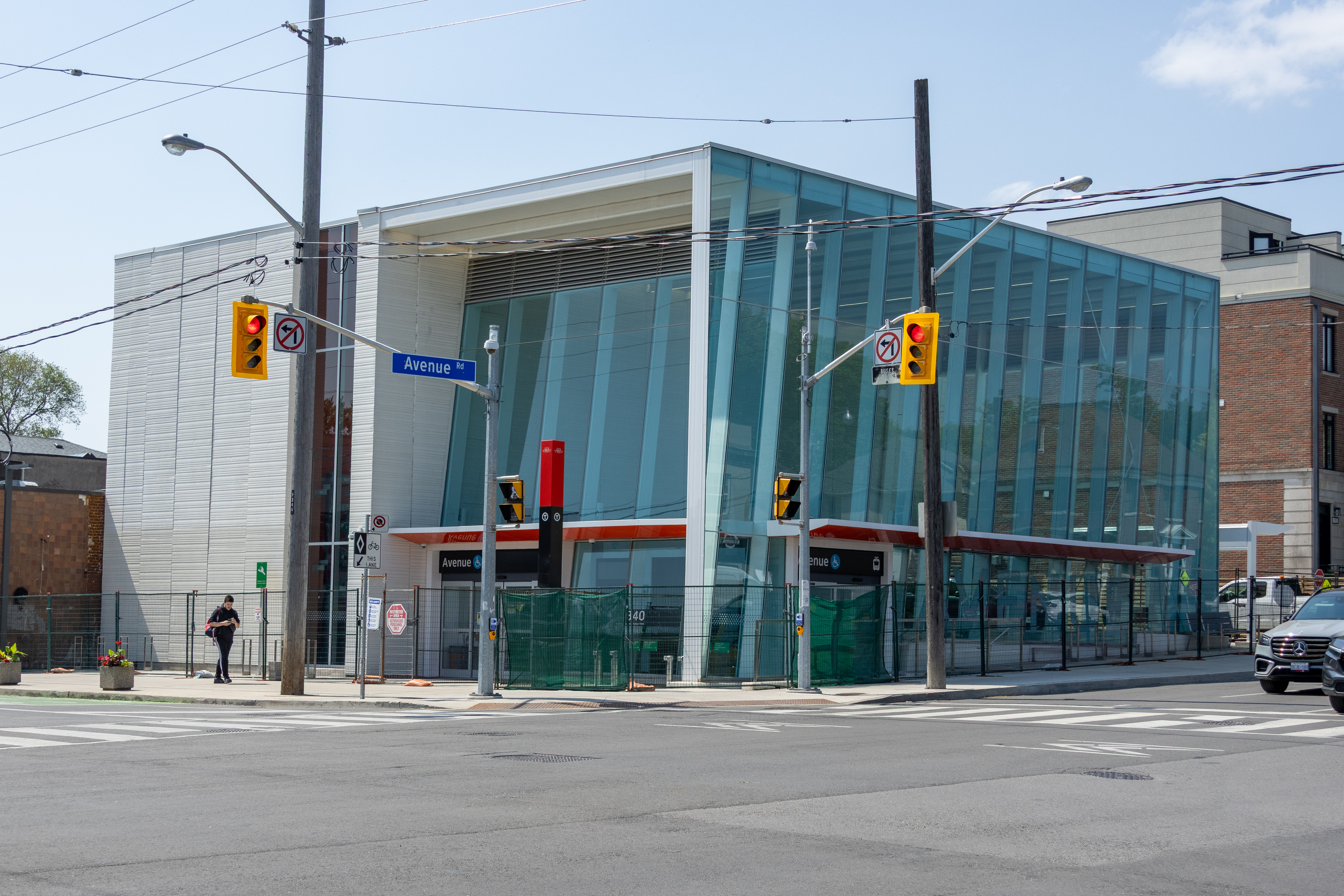
Exterior entrance in June 2025, prior to opening

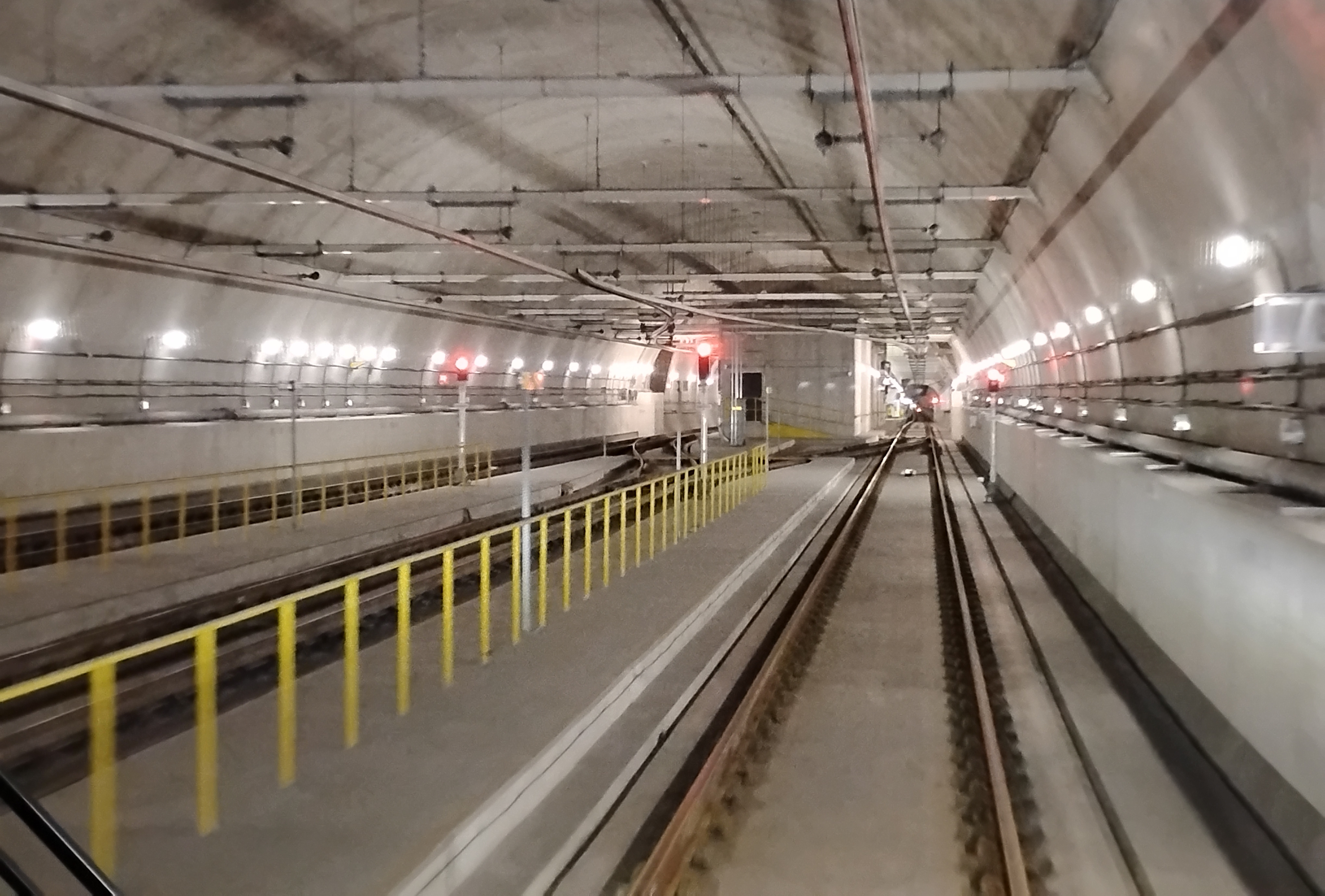
The tubular centre track structure east of the station

The main entrance to this underground station is located on the northwest corner of Eglinton and Avenue Road; the second entrance is located approximately 80 metres (260 ft) east on the north side of Eglinton. Retail space is available at the secondary entrance at street level. The station will have on-street connections to TTC buses and outdoor parking for 50 bicycles. There is a third centre track on the east side of the station between the eastbound and westbound tracks either to store a train or to allow a train to change direction due to an emergency or a change in service.

Avenue station was one of four underground stations that was "mined" (built using the sequential excavation method) rather than being built using the cut-and-cover method like most of the other underground stations. Both the station platform and the centre-track structure are part of a single circular tube, and there are no support columns between the three tracks. Shops were demolished to construct the two station entrances.

=== Architecture ===
The station was designed by Dialog and Arcadis, following an architectural concept designed by architects gh3* from Toronto and Daoust Lestage Lizotte Stecker from Montreal. As with other stations on Line 5, architectural features includes natural light from large windows and skylights, steel structures painted white, and orange accents (the colour of the line).

=== Station naming ===
In a report to the TTC Board on November 23, 2015, it was recommended that stations on Line 5 Eglinton should be given unique names. Metrolinx initially proposed that the station be named Avenue, for Avenue Road. Later, Metrolinx changed the proposed name to Oriole Park. However, by January 2016, the proposed station name had been changed back to Avenue because Oriole Park was too similar to the name of another transit station within Toronto, namely Oriole GO Station on GO Transit's Richmond Hill line.

== Surface connections ==
The following bus routes serve Avenue station:

| Route | Name | Additional information |
|---|---|---|
| 13 | Avenue Road | Northbound to Eglinton station and southbound to Queen's Park station and Gerrard Street |
| 34 | Eglinton | Westbound to Mount Dennis station and eastbound to Kennedy station |
| 61 | Avenue Road North | Northbound to Highway 401 and southbound to Eglinton station |
| 334A | Eglinton | Blue Night service; eastbound to Kennedy station and westbound to Renforth Drive and Pearson Airport |
| 334B | Eglinton | Blue Night service; eastbound to Finch Avenue East and Neilson Road via Morningside Avenue and westbound to Mount Dennis station |
