= Chaplin station =

Toronto subway station

Chaplin
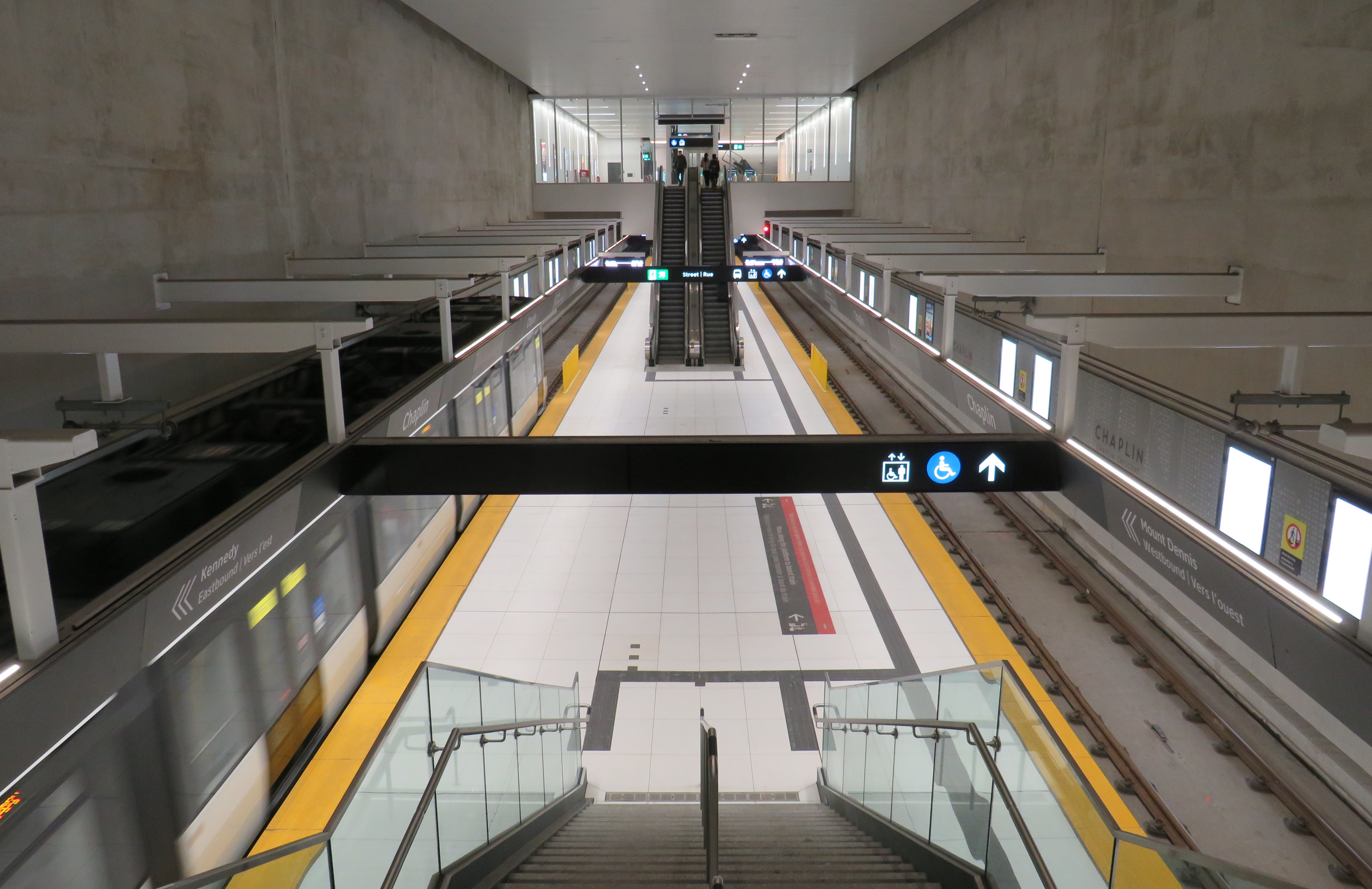
- Chaplin station platform

General information
- Location: 574 Eglinton Avenue West; Toronto, Ontario; Canada
- Coordinates: 43°42′10″N 79°25′02″W
- Owner: Metrolinx
- Platforms: Centre platform
- Tracks: 2
- Connections: TTC buses: 14 Glencairn; 33 Forest Hill; 34 Eglinton; 334 Eglinton

Construction
- Structure type: Underground
- Accessible: Yes
- Architect: Dialog and Arcadis

History
- Opened: February 8, 2026; 9 months ago

Services
Preceding station	Toronto Transit Commission	Following station
Forest Hill towards Mount Dennis	Line 5 Eglinton	Avenue towards Kennedy
Location

Chaplin is an underground Toronto subway station on Line 5 Eglinton in Toronto, Ontario, Canada. It is located in the Forest Hill neighbourhood at the intersection of Chaplin Crescent and Eglinton Avenue.

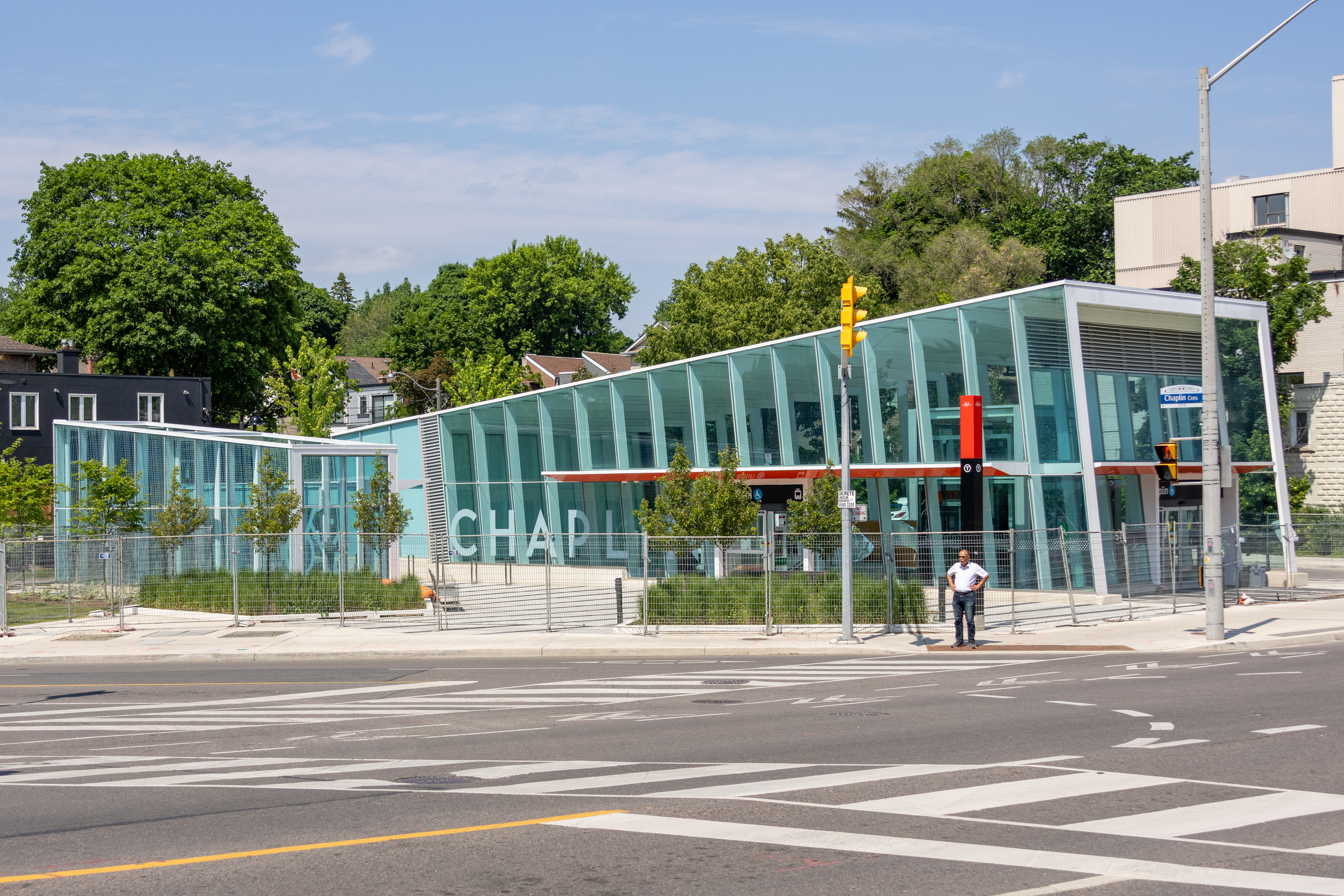
Main entrance prior to opening in June 2025

The station has three entrances: a main entry at Gilgorm Road and Eglinton Avenue West, next to an expanded Chaplin Parkette and replacing a retail building; a second entrance on the south side of Eglinton between Chaplin Crescent and the Kay Gardner Beltline Park; and a third, also on the south side, about halfway between Chaplin Crescent and Russell Hill Road. The TTC 14 Glencairn bus route will connect at this station.

Destinations include Forest Hill Collegiate Institute, the Forest Hill Library, North Prep, the Beltline Trail, the Forest Hill Memorial Park, and the Larry Grossman Forest Hill Memorial Arena.

== Construction ==
Property at 574 Eglinton Avenue West was expropriated for the construction of the main Chaplin station entrance.

In order to accommodate the third entrance, fire station 135 located at 641 Eglinton Avenue West was closed and its eastern portion demolished. The western portion has been retained. The fire hall was built in 1932, and is listed on the City of Toronto Inventory of Heritage Properties. A replacement fire station was established on the west side of Chaplin Crescent just north of Eglinton Avenue West.

By September 2021, electrical and communications systems had been installed and were ready for use between Caledonia and Chaplin stations, although vehicle testing there would be conducted later in 2021.

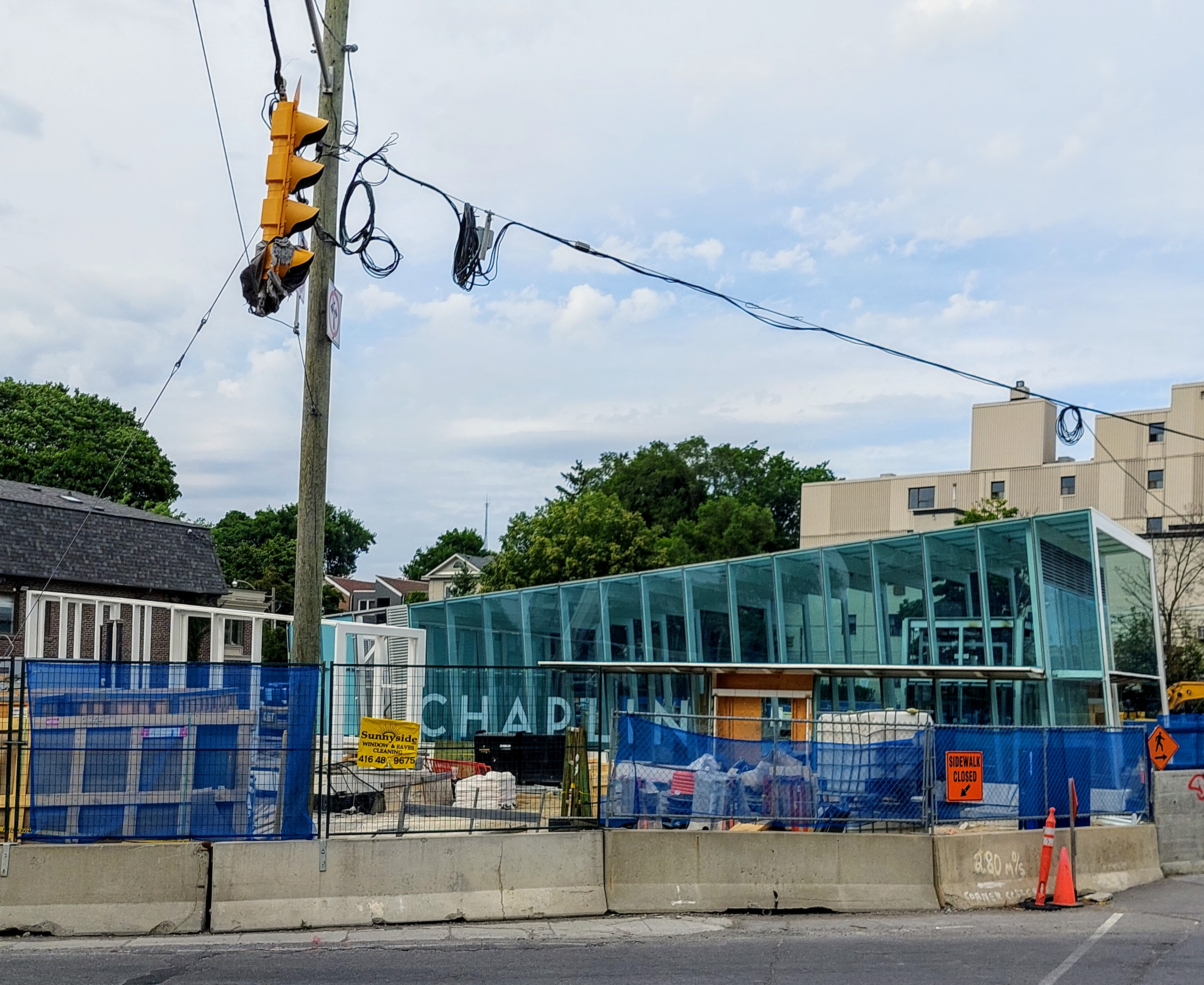
Main entrance to Chaplin station under construction in July 2022

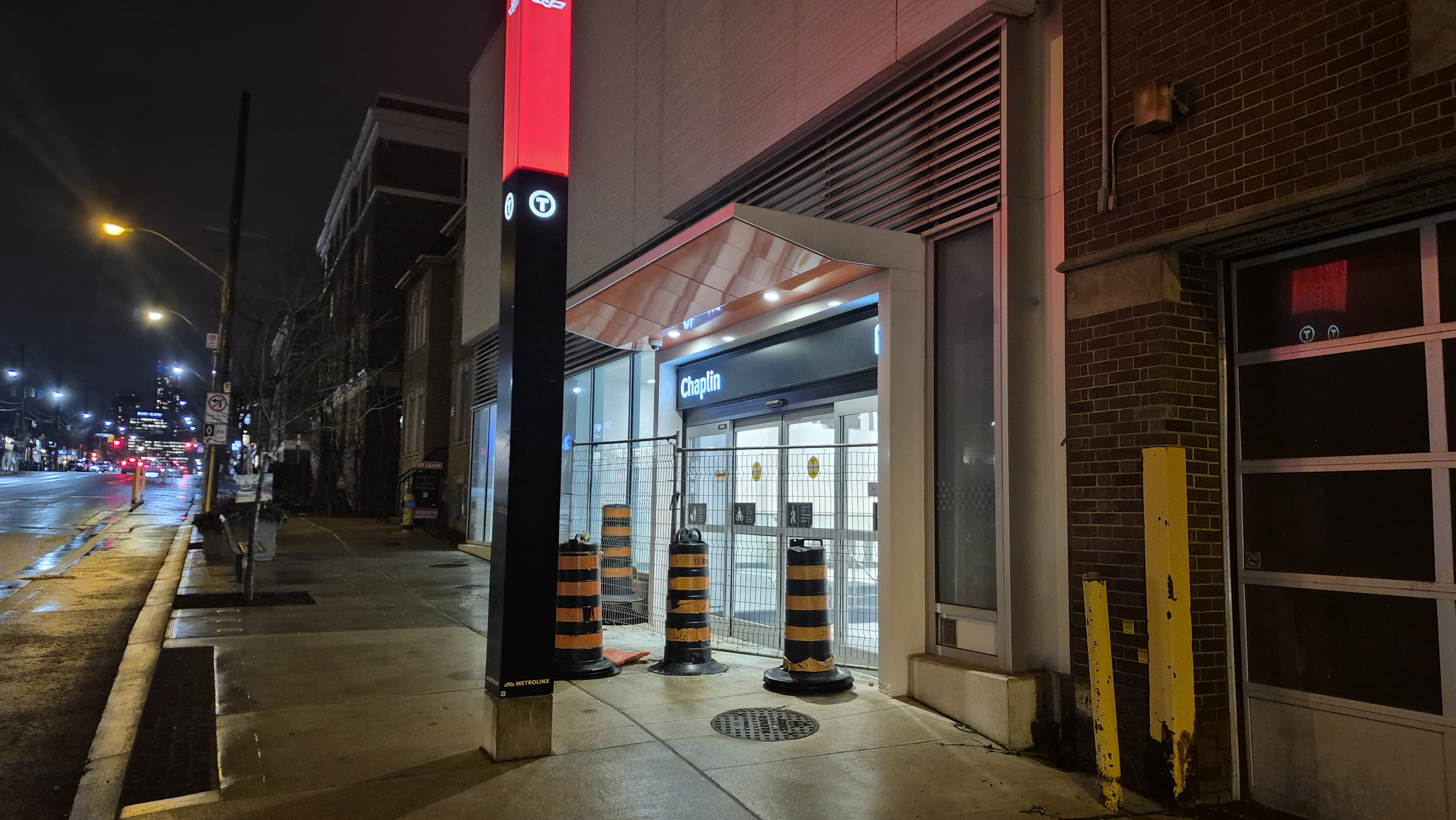
Third entrance under construction in December 2024

== Architecture ==
The station was designed by Dialog and Arcadis, following an architectural concept designed by architects gh3* from Toronto and Daoust Lestage Lizotte Stecker from Montreal. As with other stations on Line 5, architectural features include natural light from large windows and skylights, steel structures painted white, and orange accents (the colour of the line).

== Surface connections ==
The following bus routes serve Chaplin station:

Route	Name	Additional information
14	Glencairn	Westbound to Caledonia Road and eastbound to Davisville station
33	Forest Hill	Southbound to St. Clair West station
34	Eglinton	Westbound to Mount Dennis station and eastbound to Kennedy station
334A	Eglinton	Blue Night service; eastbound to Kennedy station and westbound to Renforth Drive and Pearson Airport
334B	Eglinton	Blue Night service; eastbound to Finch Avenue East and Neilson Road via Morningside Avenue and westbound to Mount Dennis station
