= Caledonia station =

Toronto subway station

Caledonia
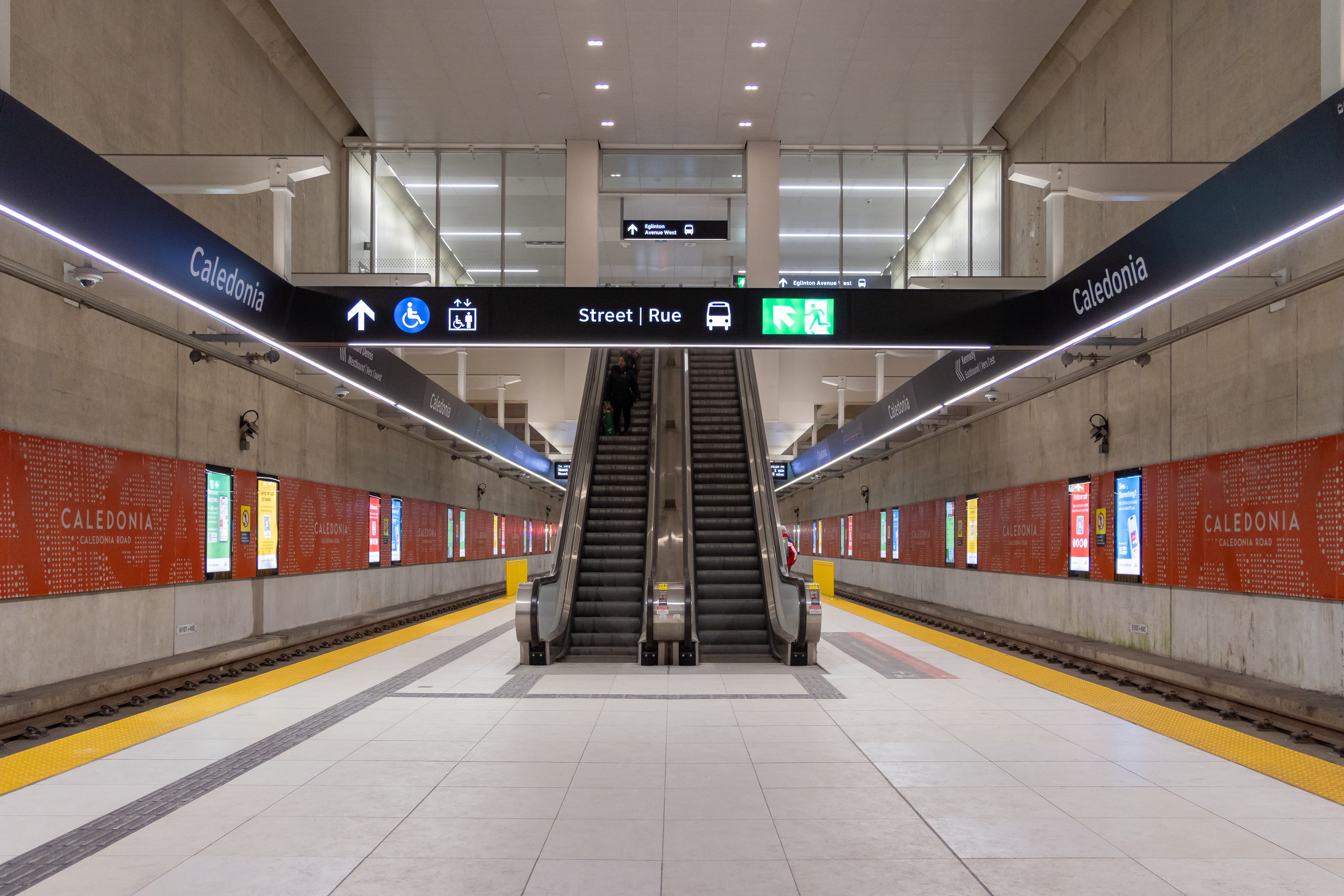
- Caledonia station platform

General information
- Location: 2320 Eglinton Avenue West; Toronto, Ontario; Canada
- Coordinates: 43°41′32″N 79°27′56″W
- Owner: Metrolinx
- Platforms: Centre platform
- Tracks: 2
- Connections: TTC buses: 18 Caledonia; 34 Eglinton; 47 Lansdowne; 334 Eglinton

Construction
- Structure type: Underground
- Accessible: Yes
- Architect: NORR

History
- Opened: Line 5: February 8, 2026; 9 months ago; GO Transit: TBA

Services
Preceding station	Toronto Transit Commission	Following station
Keelesdale towards Mount Dennis	Line 5 Eglinton	Fairbank towards Kennedy

Future services
Preceding station	GO Transit	Following station
Downsview Park towards Allandale Waterfront	Barrie	Junction Triangle towards Union
Location

Caledonia is an underground Toronto subway station on Line 5 Eglinton in Toronto, Ontario, Canada. It is located along Eglinton Avenue between the GO Transit Barrie rail corridor and the entrance to the Westside Mall. It is about 200 metres (660 ft) west of Caledonia Road opposite Blackthorn Avenue.

In April 2014, the station's headwalls were tunnelled through.

== Description ==
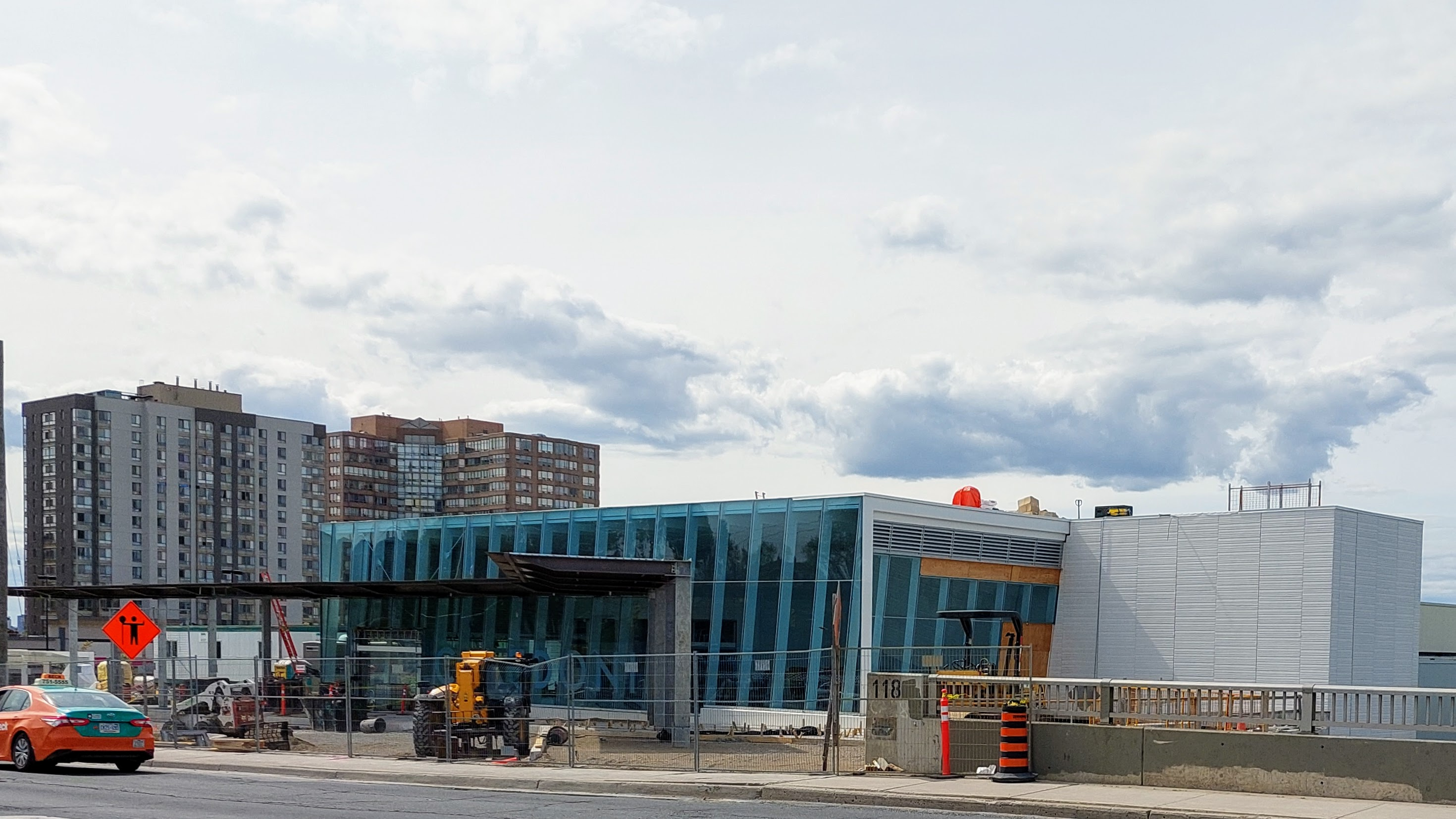
Caledonia LRT station building under construction in May 2022

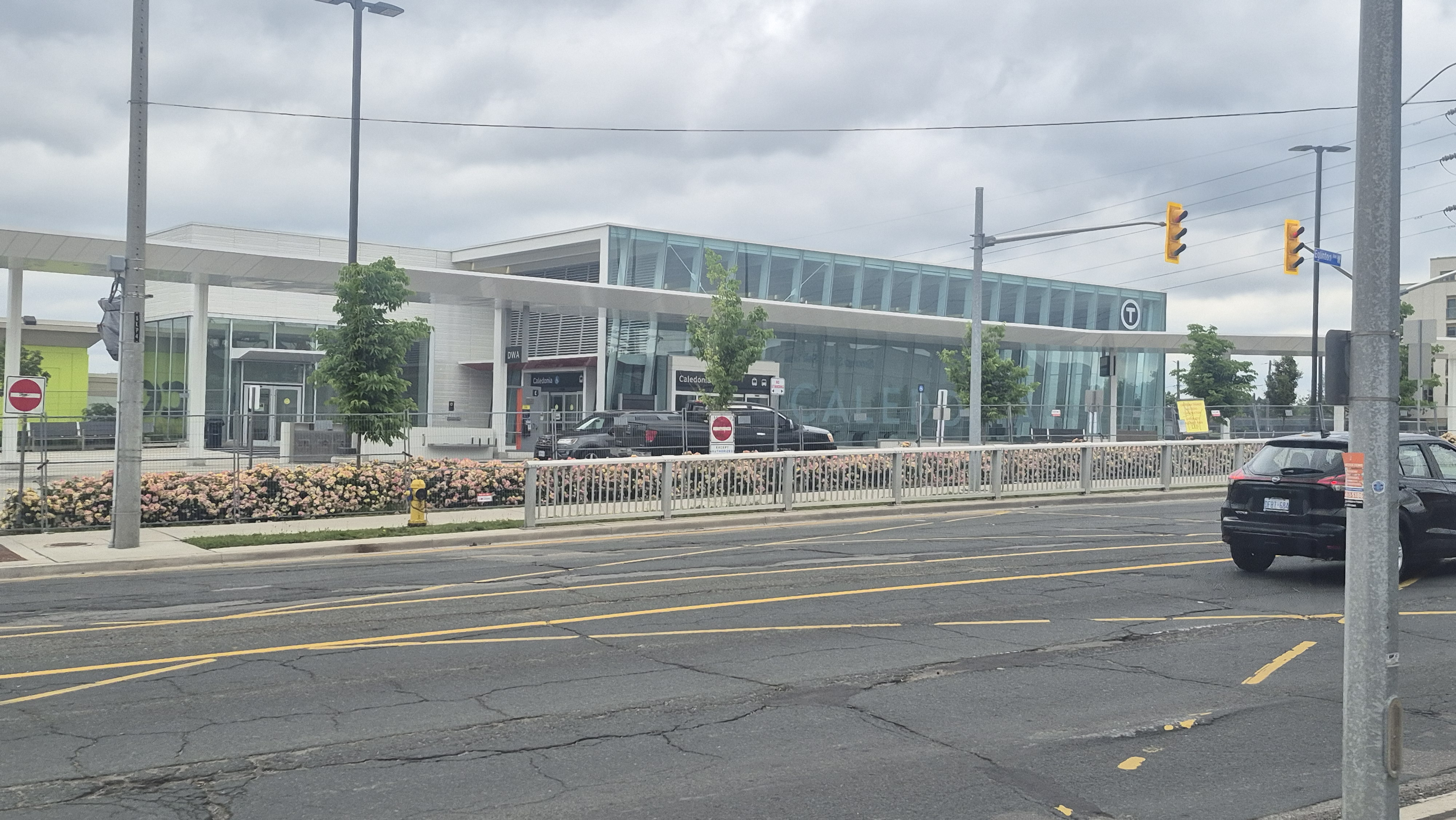
Main entrance prior to opening in June 2025

The main entrance faces Eglinton Avenue West and has a small station plaza. The station includes a bus loop with two bus bays, outdoor parking for 60 bicycles and retail spaces within the main entrance at ground level.

The underground station platform is located on the north side of Eglinton Avenue directly under the main entrance. The station design provides an opportunity to bring sunlight from this entrance down to the platform level via an open shaft from the upper concourse.

=== Artwork and architecture ===
The station was designed by NORR, following an architectural concept designed by architects gh3* from Toronto and Daoust Lestage Lizotte Stecker from Montreal. As with other stations on Line 5, architectural features include natural light from large windows and skylights, steel structures painted white, and orange accents (the colour of the line).

As part of a program to install artworks at major interchange stations along Line 5 Eglinton, Caledonia station features the artwork Ride of Your Life by Janice Kerbel, consisting of a series of large-scale mosaic wall works visible from the Line 5 platform level. The artwork shows mosaic images of signage with multiple typefaces and sizes, similar to fairground posters from the early 1900s.

== Caledonia GO Station ==
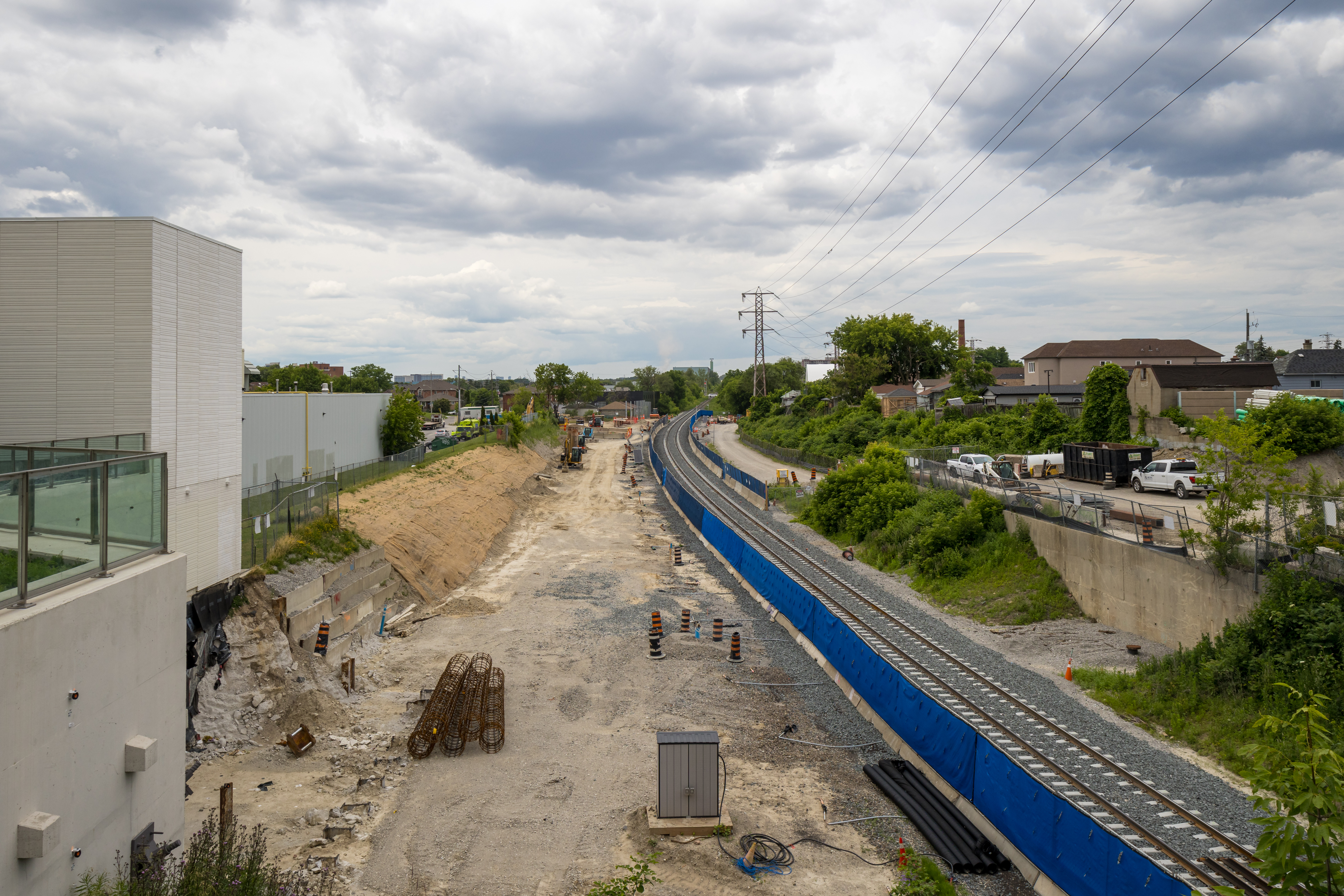
Caledonia GO station platform (and double-tracking) under construction in June 2026

In May 2015, Metrolinx announced plans to add Caledonia as a future stop on the GO Transit Barrie line. Construction of the GO portion of the station was expected to take two years and began in October 2025.

The LRT station will be integrated with the planned GO station. There will be a pedestrian bridge connecting the GO station to the LRT station's main entrance. The GO station will have a second entrance at its north end where both the York Beltline Trail and Bowie Avenue end. In future, through the GO Expansion project, a second track is planned for the GO line to enable all-day, two-way GO train service. Once complete, Caledonia will be the Barrie line's 12th station and third stop within Toronto.

== Surface connections ==
The bus terminal is not within the fare-paid area. The following bus routes serve Caledonia station:

Caledonia station surface transit connections
Bay number	Route	Name	Additional information
1	18A	Caledonia	Northbound to Yorkdale station via Bridgeland Avenue
1	18B	Caledonia	Northbound to Yorkdale station via Orfus Road
2	Wheel-Trans		
3	47	Lansdowne	Southbound to Queen Street West
N/A	34	Eglinton	Westbound to Mount Dennis station and eastbound to Kennedy station (On-street connection)
N/A	334A	Eglinton	Blue Night service; eastbound to Kennedy station and westbound to Renforth Drive and Pearson Airport (On-street connection)
N/A	334B	Eglinton	Blue Night service; eastbound to Finch Avenue East and Neilson Road via Morningside Avenue and westbound to Mount Dennis station (On-street connection)
