= Western Canadian Place =

Office tower complex located in the city's downtown core of Calgary, Alberta

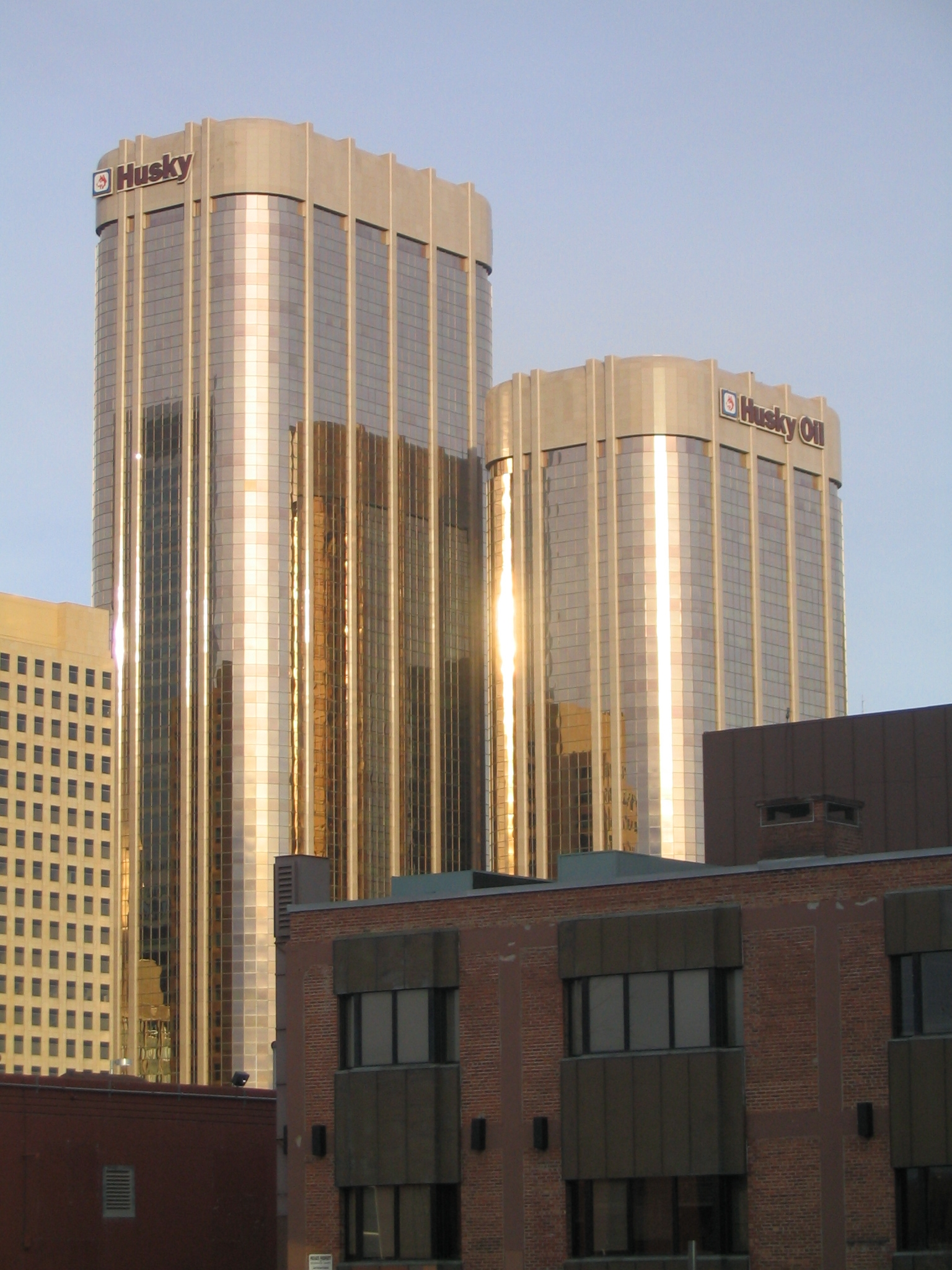
- Western Canada Place, with north tower on the left hand side
- Interactive map of the Western Canadian Place area

General information
- Type: Office
- Location: 801 6 Street SW; Calgary, Alberta; T2P 3V8
- Coordinates: 51°02′43″N 114°04′37″W
- Completed: 1983
- Owner: GWL Realty

Height
- Roof: 164 m (538 ft)

Technical details
- Floor count: 41

Design and construction
- Architect: Cohos Evamy
- Main contractor: PCL Construction Management Inc.

Website
- www.westerncanadianplace.com

Western Canadian Place is an office tower complex located in the downtown core of Calgary, Alberta, Canada. It consists of two buildings, the taller North Tower and the shorter South Tower.

It was designed by the architectural firm, Cohos Evamy (the same firm who designed Bankers Hall - East and Bankers Hall - West in Calgary) in late modernist style. The office complex was purchased in 2004 for $230,675,000 by bcIMC and is run for them by GWL Realty Advisors, one of the firms involved in building the structure.

It was the headquarters of Husky Energy and also has offices of APA Corporation.

== Towers ==
The north tower is located at 707 8th Avenue SW, it stands at 164 m (538 ft) or 40 storeys. The south tower is shorter, standing only 30 storeys for a height of 128 meters (420 feet). The ensemble was completed in 1983.

Tower	Height	Storeys	Built	Address
North Tower	164 m (538 ft)	41	1983	707 - 8th Avenue SW
South Tower	128 m (420 ft)	31	1983	700 - 9th Avenue SW

== Photo gallery ==
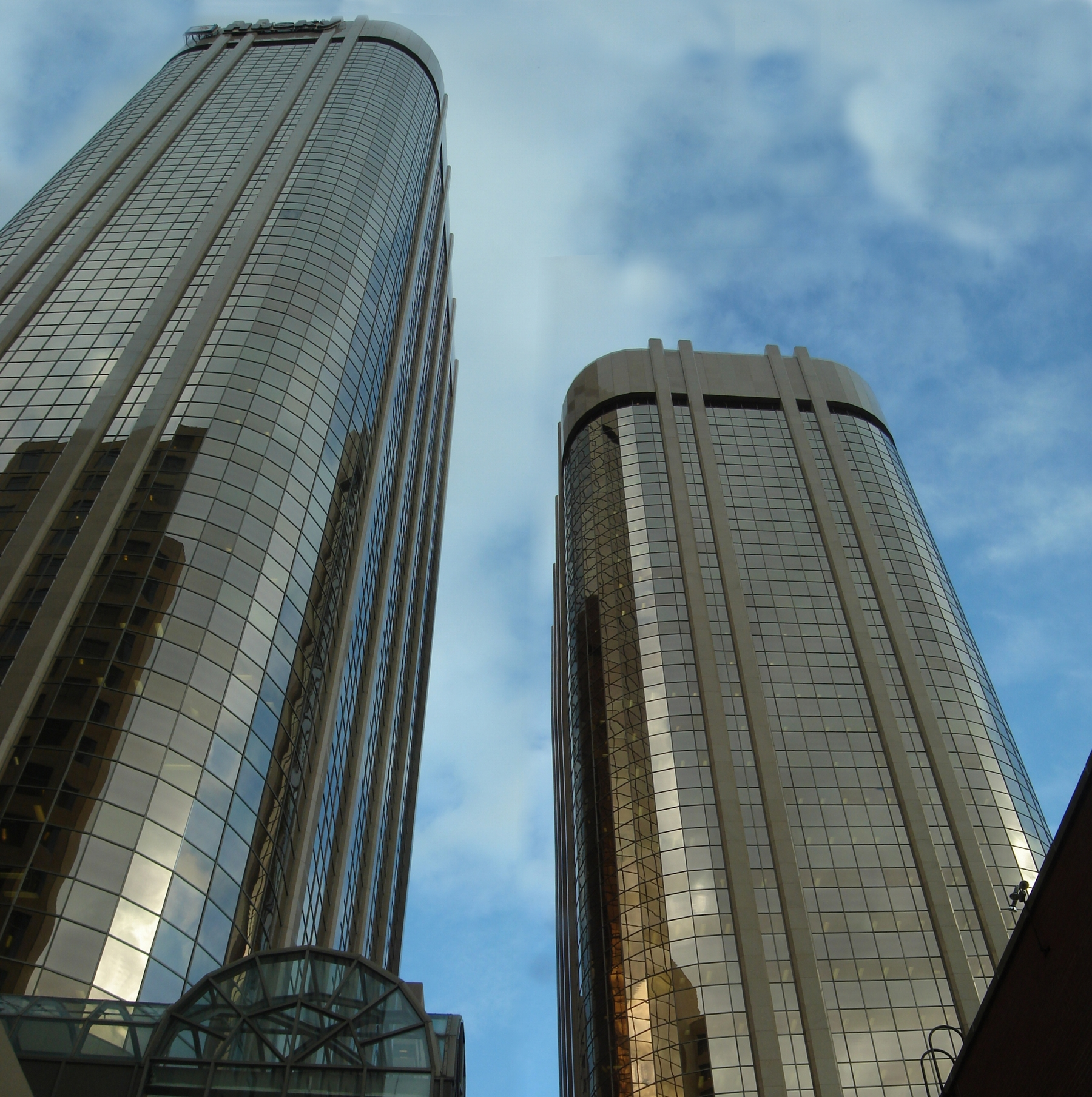
View from street level

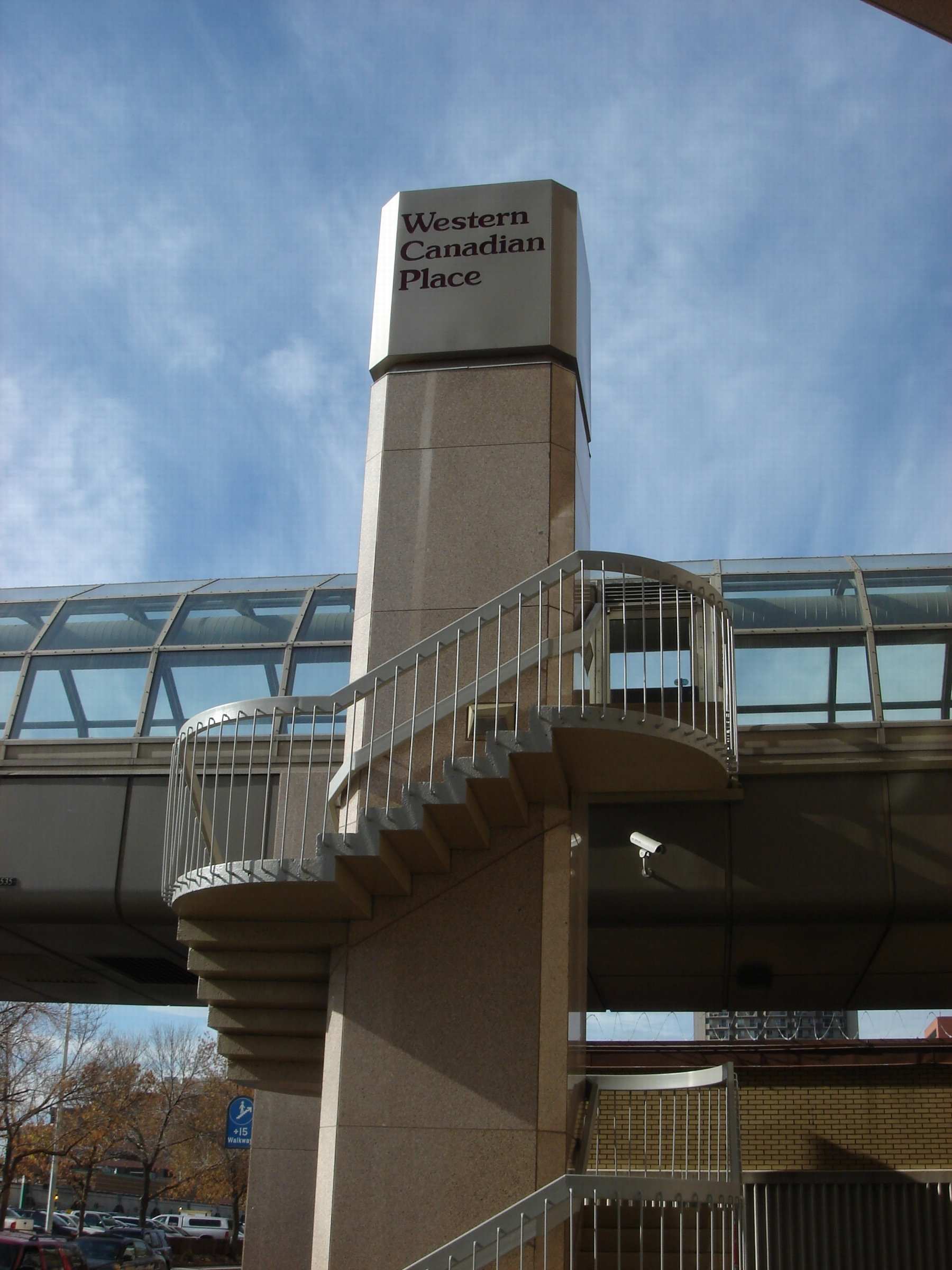
+15 connection above 9th Avenue S

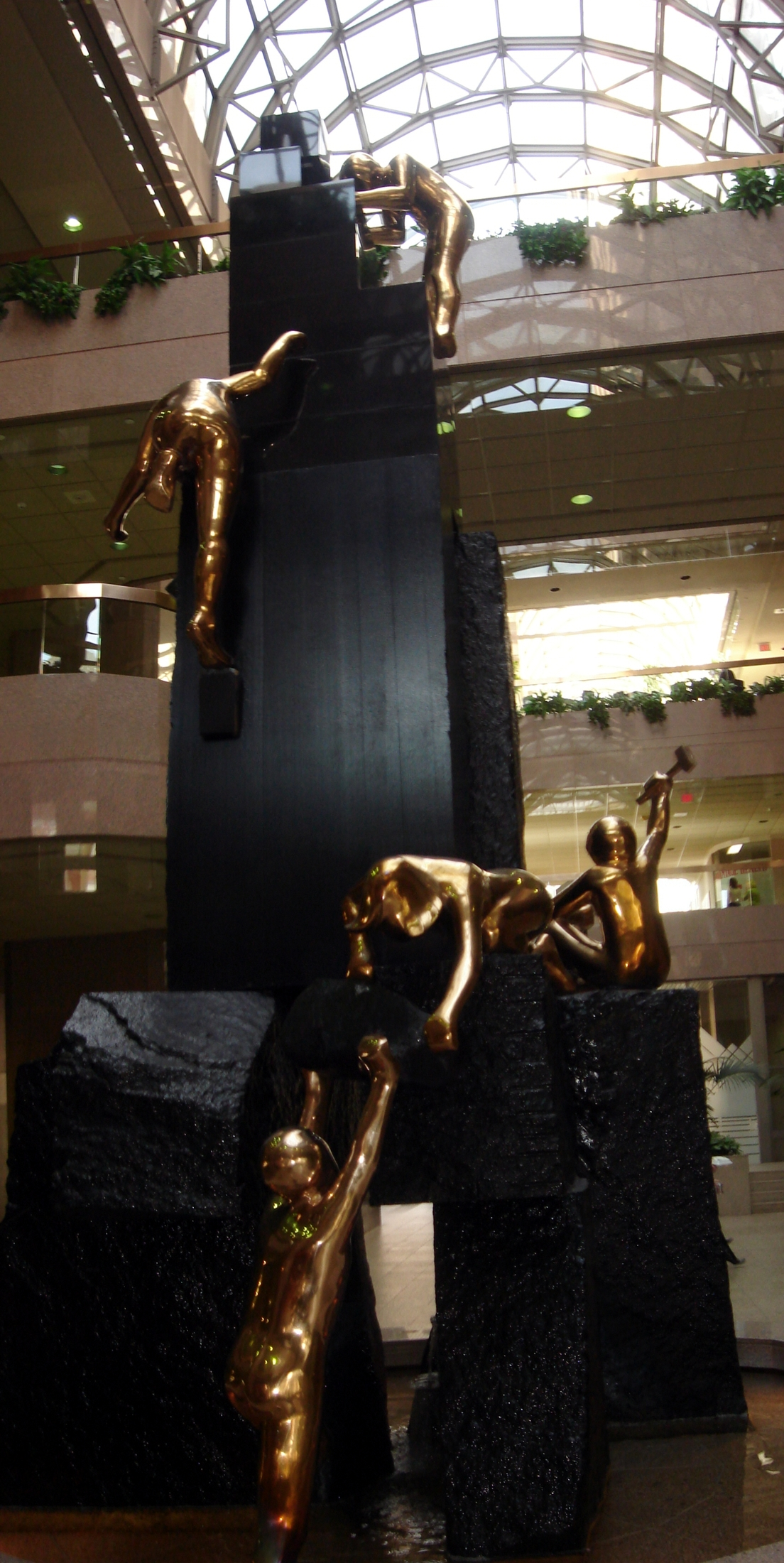
Corporate art in main lobby

== See also ==
- List of tallest buildings in Calgary
