= Junction Triangle GO Station =

Future railway station in Toronto, Ontario, Canada

Junction Triangle
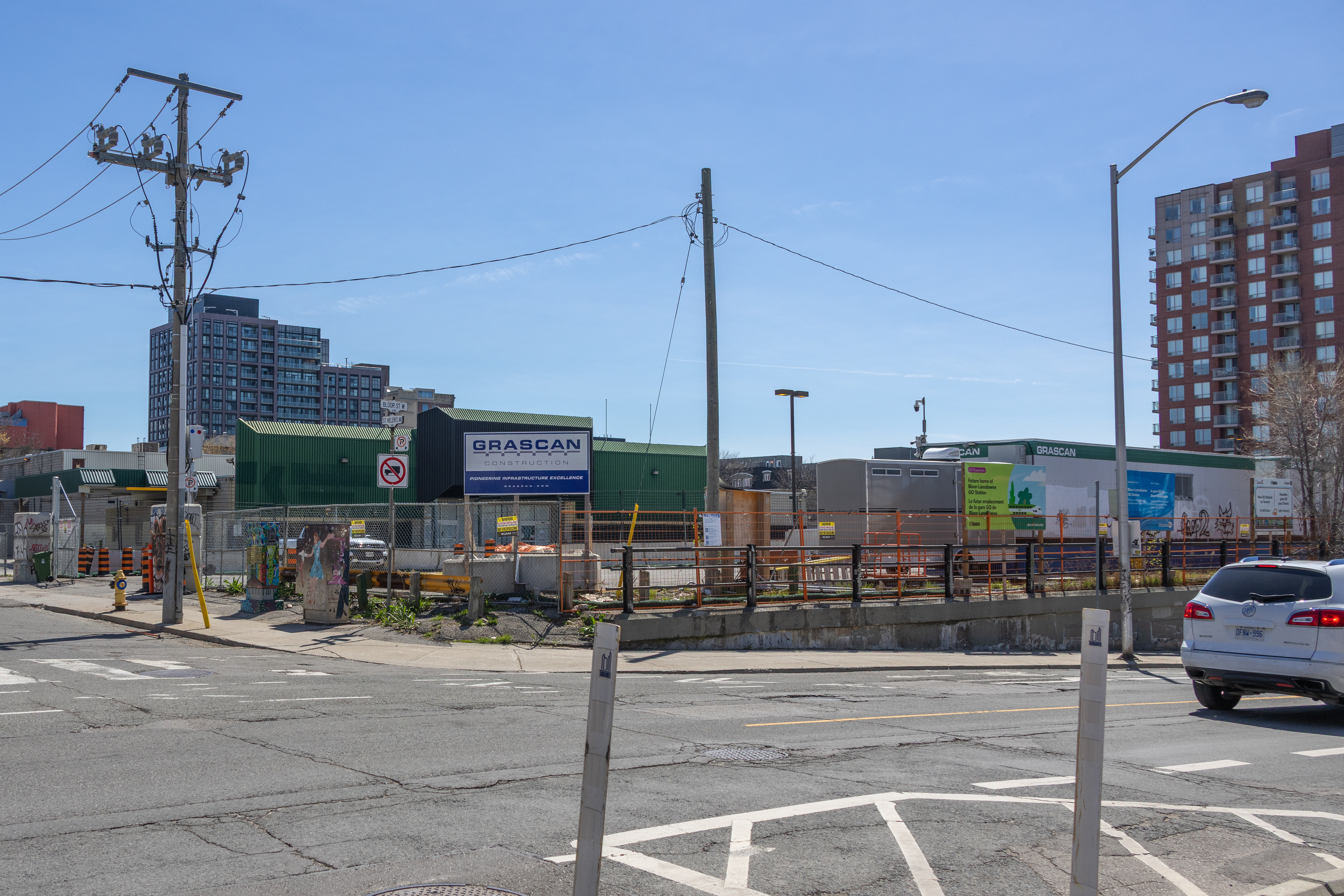
- Site of the future station seen from Bloor Street in April 2026

General information
- Location: Bloor Street, Toronto, Ontario; Canada
- Coordinates: 43°39′27″N 79°26′42″W
- Owner: Metrolinx
- Platforms: Side platforms
- Tracks: 2
- Connections: at Lansdowne

Construction
- Parking: No

Other information
- Status: Under construction

History
- Opening: 2027

Services
Preceding station	GO Transit	Following station
Caledonia towards Allandale Waterfront	Barrie Planned Expansion	Spadina–Front towards Union
Location

Metrolinx exhibit
- Artist rendition of Bloor–Lansdowne GO Station

Junction Triangle GO Station is an under construction commuter train station in Toronto, Ontario, Canada. It will be an infill station on the Barrie line of GO Transit located between the future Caledonia and Spadina–Front stations. All three stations will be located between the current Downsview Park and Union stations. Junction Triangle is one of five GO stations to be built as part of the SmartTrack Stations Program to adapt regional commuter service for urban public transit.

The station was announced in June 2016. Originally named "Bloor–Lansdowne", the station was renamed "Junction Triangle" by Metrolinx in August 2026. The station is named after the Junction Triangle neighbourhood where it will be located. Construction was planned to start in February 2024 for completion in May 2027, but did not begin until late 2025.

== Description ==
Junction Triangle GO Station will be located on the south side of Bloor Street, west of St. Helens Avenue along the Barrie line's two-track rail corridor. The main entrance will be on the south side of Bloor Street just below the east side of the railway bridge. At the south end of the station there will be an entrance from St. Helens Avenue on the east side, and from Sterling Road on the west side. There will be a tunnel to connect the north- and southbound platforms with access by stairs and elevators. Bicycle parking and a drop-off area that can support passengers using paratransit vehicles will be provided. The station will be approximately 200 metres (660 ft) west of Lansdowne subway station at Lansdowne Avenue.

A multi-use path will pass along the east side of the station, and cross Bloor Street parallel to the railway overpass. At the south end, it will connect with the West Toronto Rail Path. At the north end, it will connect with the Davenport Diamond Greenway, from which pedestrians can turn off to walk east along Wade Avenue to access Lansdowne subway station.

== TTC connections ==
TTC routes that would serve the new station are:

- 47 Lansdowne at Lansdowne Avenue
- Line 2 Bloor–Danforth at Lansdowne station
