= Dialog (architectural firm) =

Canadian architectural firm

DIALOG (architectural firm)

Practice information
- Founded: 1960
- Location: Vancouver, Calgary, Edmonton, Toronto, Ottawa, San Francisco
- Affiliations: Cohos Evamy, HBBH (formerly)

Website
- www.dialogdesign.ca

DIALOG (formerly Cohos Evamy) is a North American architectural, engineering, interior design and planning firm. It operates as a single company, with studios in Vancouver, Calgary, Edmonton, Toronto, Ottawa, and San Francisco.

== History ==
Cohos Evamy was founded as an architecture and engineering studio in Calgary, Alberta, Canada in 1960, and quickly evolved into an interdisciplinary model under the leadership of Martin Cohos, FRAIC, Michael Evamy, FAIC and Paul Poffenroth, P.Eng. The Cohos Evamy Partners opened the Edmonton office in the 1980s.

In 2003, Cohos Evamy opened a Toronto, Ontario studio. In 2010, Cohos Evamy merged with Vancouver-based architectural firm HBBH, among others, and was renamed DIALOG. In 2026, DIALOG opened an Ottawa, Ontario studio.

== Areas of practice ==
Areas of practice include architecture, programming, urban planning, landscape architecture, interior design, graphics, 3D modeling, and structural, mechanical, and electrical engineering. The practice includes designing buildings for retail, commercial office, education, health care institutions, research facilities, airports, retail petroleum stations, and arts and cultural work.

As of 2022, the firm employed more than 700 people.

== Portfolio ==
- TC Energy Tower, Calgary, Alberta
- Western Canadian Place, Calgary, Alberta
- Bankers Hall, Calgary, Alberta
- Bankers Court, Calgary, Alberta
- Calgary International Airport, Calgary, Alberta
- Transalta Arts Barns, Edmonton, Alberta
- Listowel Memorial Hospital, Listowel, Ontario (Currently under construction)
- Winspear Centre, Edmonton, Alberta
- Calgary Central Library, Calgary, Alberta
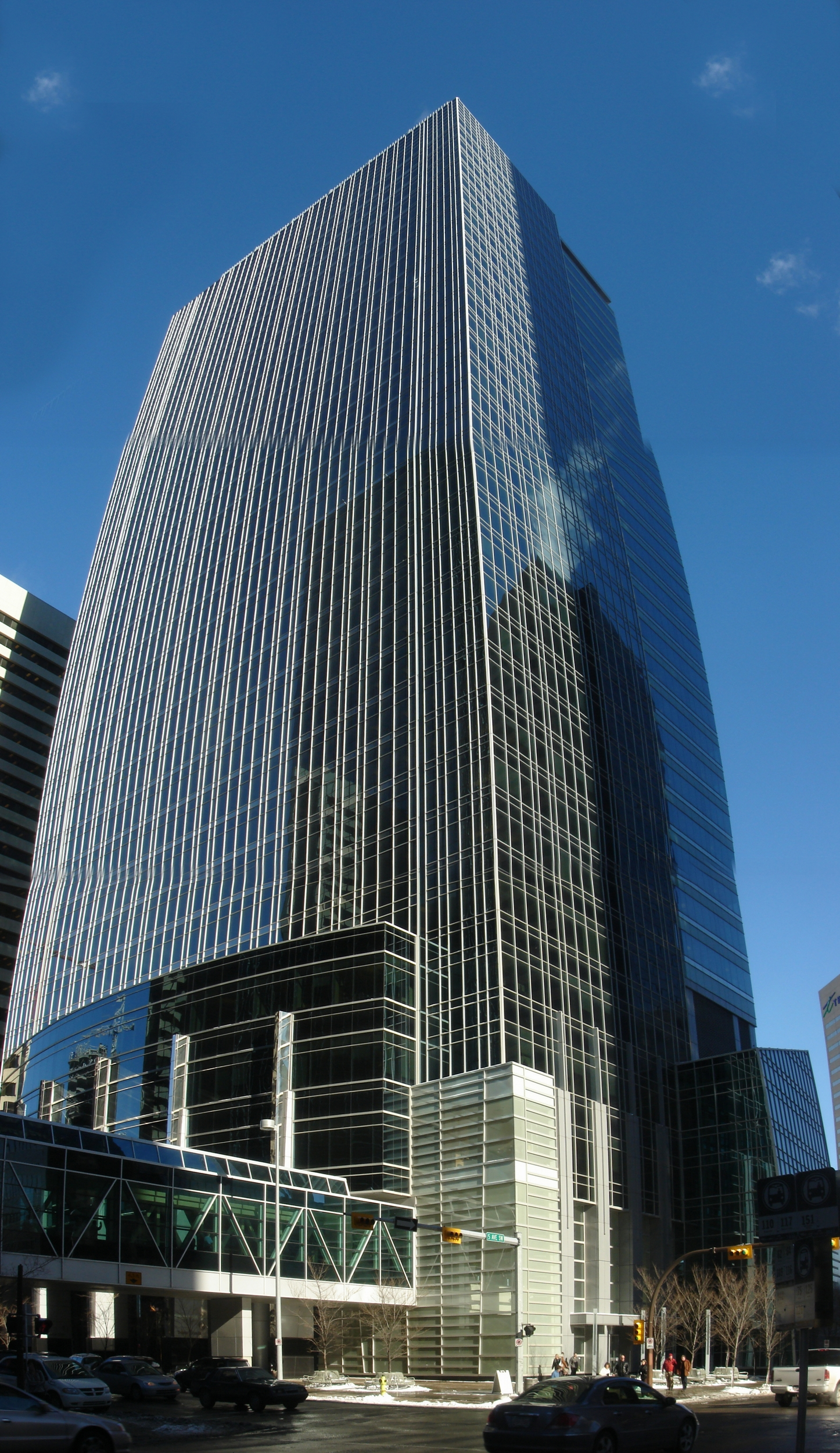
  TransCanada Tower
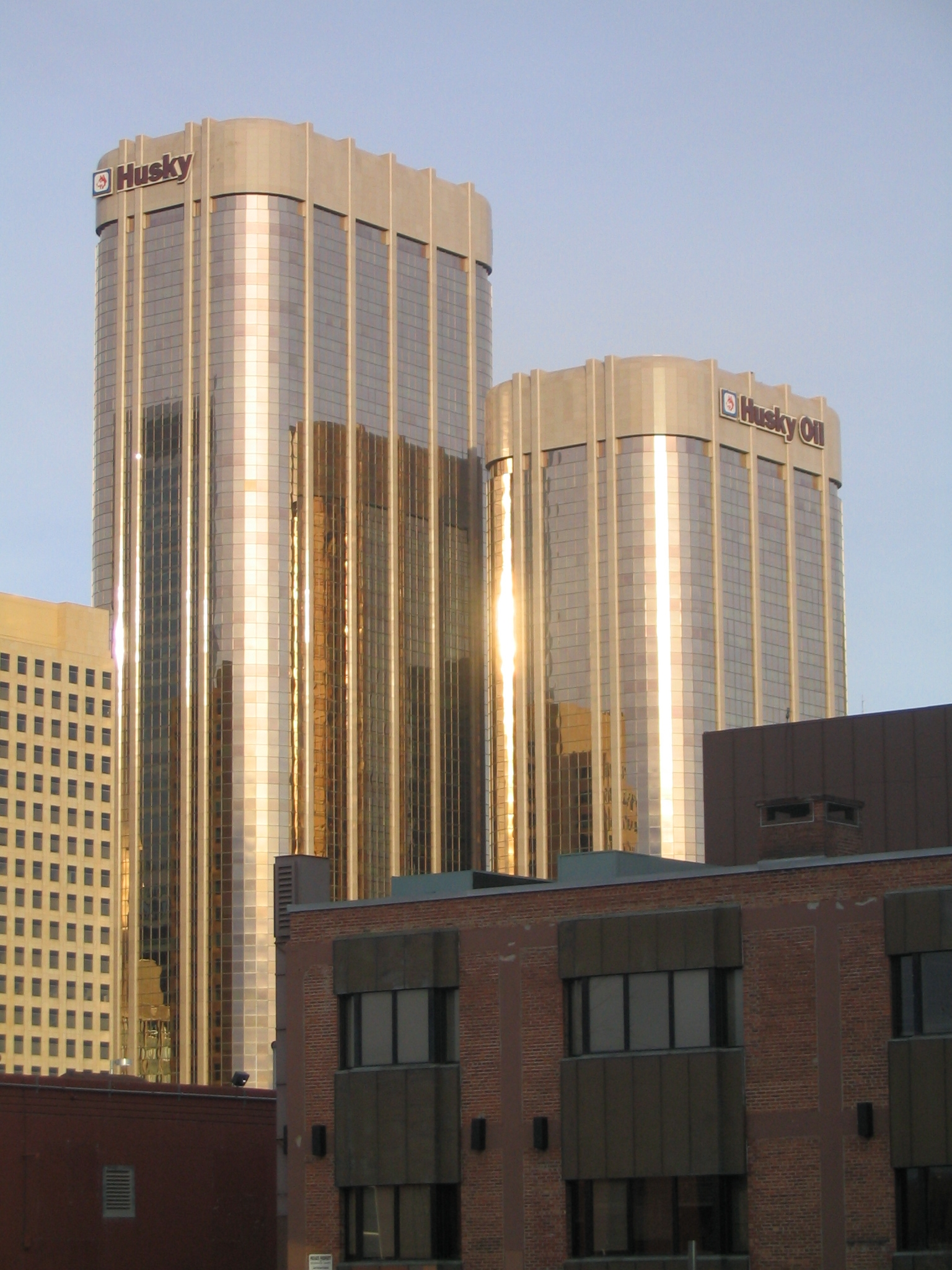
  Western Canadian Place
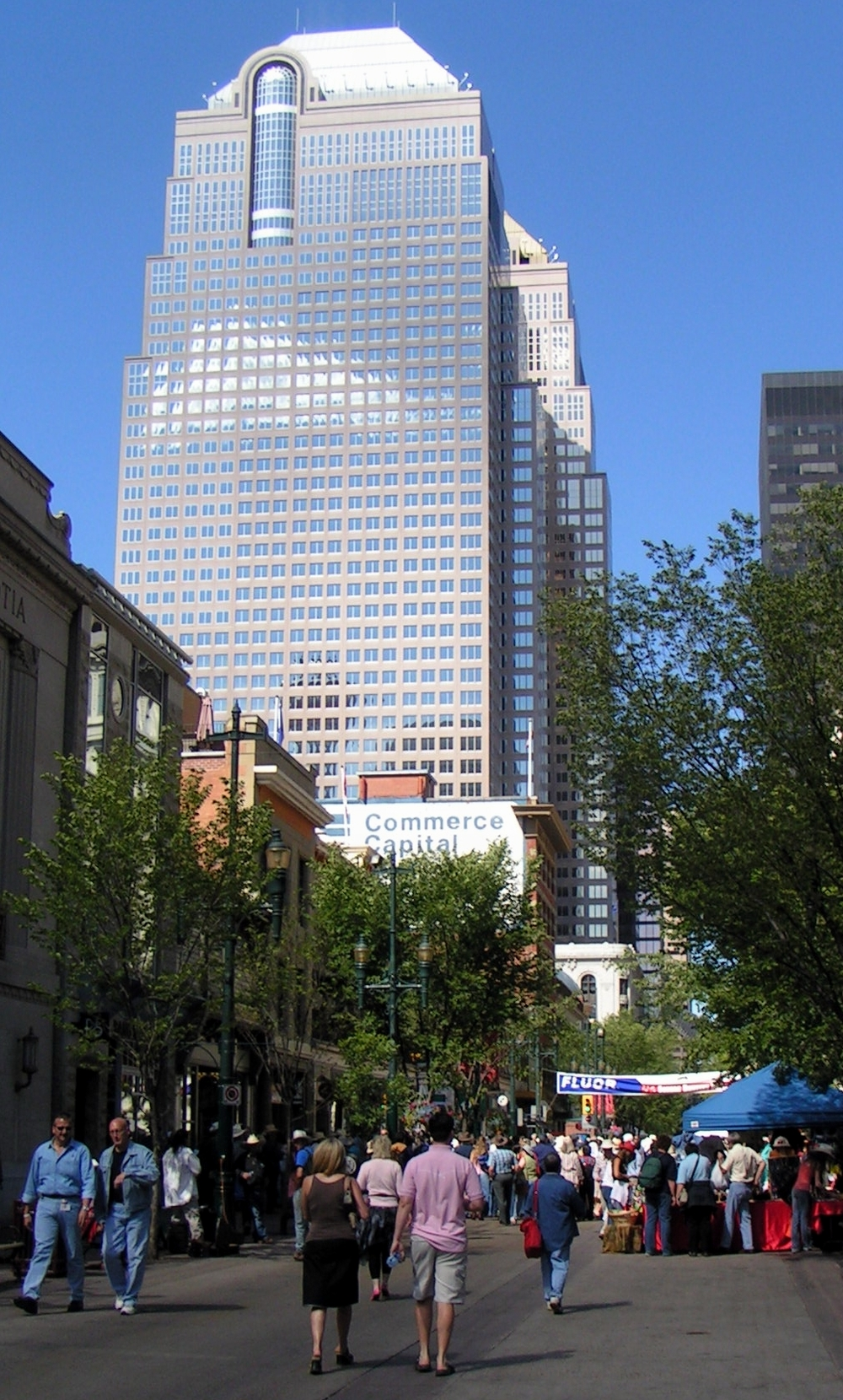
  Bankers Hall
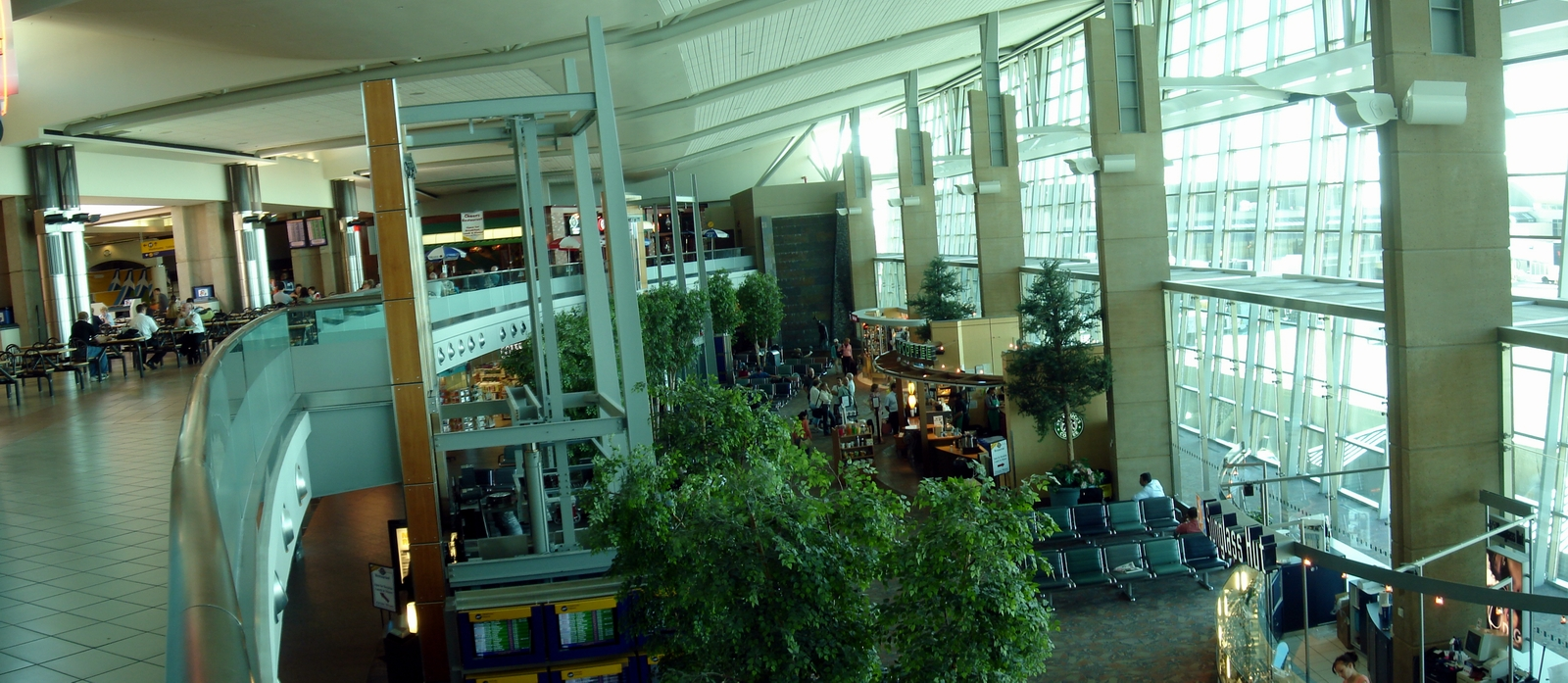
  Calgary International Airport
