= Daoust Lestage =

Canadian architectural firm

Daoust Lestage is a Canadian architectural firm based in Montreal, Quebec, that focuses on landscape architecture and urban design. The firm has worked on a variety of projects, and often focus on outdoor, public urban spaces; such as the Place des Festivals in Montreal that has won awards like the Urban Design Prize and Best Landscape Architecture Award. The firm began as a collaboration with an established Quebec firm Gauthier Guite Roy from 1988 to 1996. The firm has been recognized on a "provincial, national and international level", with 116 awards for their work throughout the years.

== History ==
The principals of Daoust Lestage are urbanists Renee Daoust and Real Lestage who established the firm together in 1988; they now have 25 employees in total. Both partners are urban planners but Renee Daoust is also an architect. At the start of their practice in 1988 they were a part of the well known firm Gauthier Guite Roy in Quebec. Gauthier Guite Daoust Lestage was then created, as Jean-Marie Roy retired to make room for the two newcomers. Their combined firm stayed in Montreal from 1988 to 1996. Their firm focused on maintaining a contemporary approach whilst still being respectful to the history of place. In 2000, Gilles Guite retired however Paul Gauthier stayed with Daoust Lestage for three more years before leaving to practice on his own under the name Paul Gauthier Architecte. Renee Daoust and Real Lestage credit this experience with their ability to manage important projects well.

== Design approach ==
Daoust Lestage practices mostly landscape architecture and urban design with a focus on outdoor, urban realm spaces. A basis for their design approach comes from their background with Gauthier Guite Daoust Lestage, they come at projects from a modern point of view with a strong knowledge and respect of the history for the project at hand. The firm has expressed the difficulties they face with working in Quebec. The focus there is on money and saving it whereas innovation comes at a cost. Daoust Lestage strives to design the innovation and sustainability regardless of the backlash they receive, they believe the benefits outweigh the initial cost. The firm's overarching goal is to bring together all elements of design from all connecting fields- architecture, landscape, urban design, graphics, interior design, industrial design and urban design. By bringing together all elements of design along with the present and historical context they are able to create their best designs.

== Projects ==
=== Pavillon du Lac ===
The Pavillon du Lac is a 115 square-meter guest house located close to Montreal. Daoust Lestage practiced architecture and landscape architecture on the project and completed it in 2015. The design takes a minimalist approach and is surrounded by forest at the edge of a lake. It was essential for the new guest house to stay within the footprint of the previous cabin, and consider, incorporate and respect the sloped landscape. The stand out element of the house is the all glass walls, drawing inspiration from Mies van der Rohe's Farnsworth House. Daoust Lestage's focus on sustainability were important in this design as creating a building out of glass took a level of thought in terms of thermal comfort. The windows are all triple glazed with a roof overhang all around to limit direct sunlight in the summer months, the roof is also clad with a green roof that is covered in native plants to blend with the landscape. The remnants of a small cottage were on the site prior to building which is why the owner was able to build so close to the lake; by creating a glass facade the building acts as less of an intrusion on the lake front. Something that Daoust Lestage finds important in design is blurring the line between inside and outside- something this project accomplishes.

=== Place des Festivals ===
The Place des festivals is an urban design project in Montreal that was completed in 2009. The project was multidisciplinary, Daoust Lestage practiced urban design, landscape architecture, architecture, industrial design and graphic design to complete the project. The design won Best Landscape Architecture Award and has been coined "urban origami". The term urban origami refers to the dynamic urban environment that has been created. The site has been transformed with pathways and green space exhibiting art and architecture. The Place des Festivals was designed to host shows; the water fountains act as curtains to a stage and the large lamp creates the idea of an enclosed space with lighting fixtures, it can accommodate up to 25,000 people during these shows. The site is also littered with multiple restaurants and cultural amenities to cater to the nightlife that is imagined to go alongside theater. Located on the site is the Place des Arts sector, alongside the City of Montreal, Daoust Lestage also won the Urban Design Prize for the ability this aspect of the project. This prize intends to highlight the economic and social benefits of design, architecture and town planning in organizations, public institutions and businesses, the Place des Arts is seen to embody these things.
