= Sunnybrook Park (disambiguation) =

Sunnybrook Park may refer to:

== Canada ==
- Sunnybrook Park, a park in Toronto, Canada
- Sunnybrook Park stop, a light rail stop station on Line 5 Elglinton in Toronto, Canada

== United States ==
- Sunnybrook State Park, a state park in Torrington, Connecticut, United States

== See also ==
- Sunnybrook (disambiguation)
