= Bayview Avenue =

Major north–south route in the Greater Toronto Area of Ontario

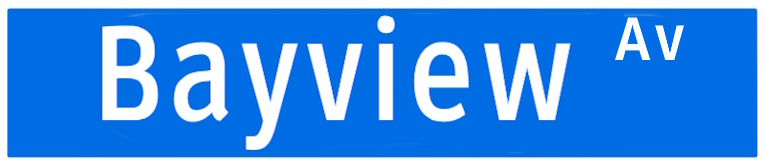
- York Regional Road 34
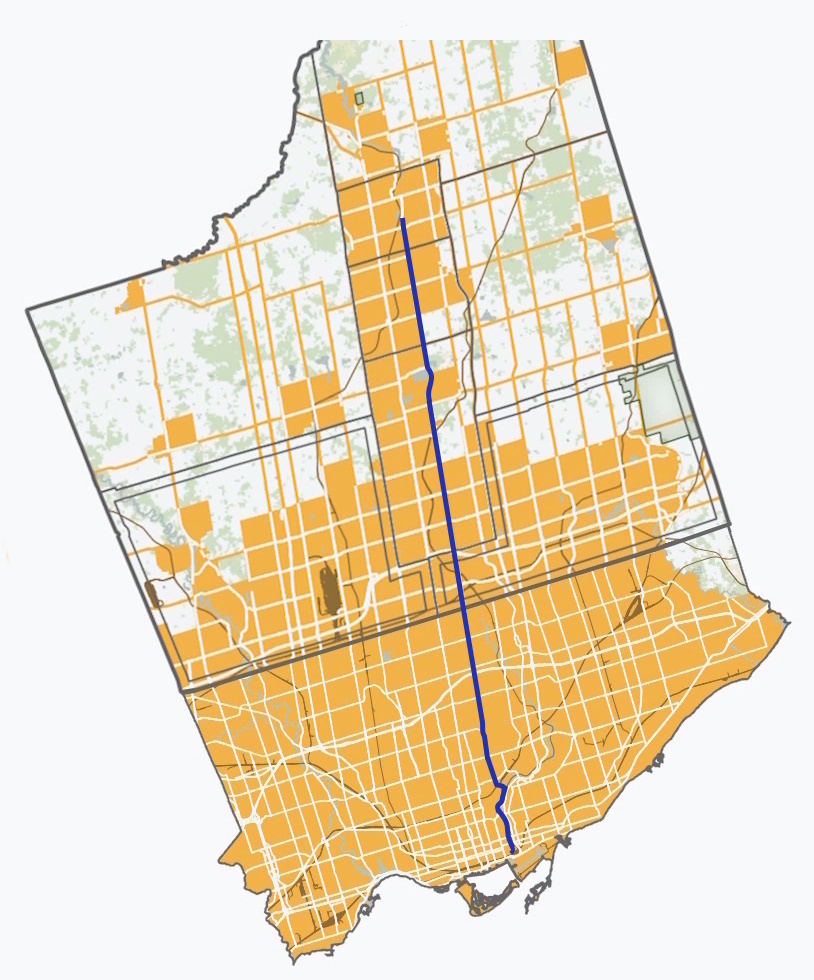
- Route of Bayview Avenue through Toronto and York Region (blue line)
- Interactive map of Bayview Avenue
- Maintained by: City of Toronto; Region of York
- Length: 46 km (29 mi)
- Location: Toronto; Markham; Richmond Hill; Aurora; Newmarket
- South end: Withrow St in Ward's Island (Continues west as Cibola Ave); On the mainland, it starts North from Mill Street in Toronto (continues West as Mill St.)
- Major junctions: Queen Street; River Street; Eglinton Avenue; Lawrence Avenue; Highway 401; Sheppard Avenue; Finch Avenue; Steeles Avenue; Highway 407; Highway 7; 16th Avenue; Major Mackenzie Drive; Stouffville Road; Bloomington Road; Mulock Drive
- North end: 2nd Street in Newmarket (continues as Prospect Street)

Other
Nearby arterial roads
← Yonge Street	Leslie Street →

Bayview Avenue is a major north–south route in the Greater Toronto Area of Ontario. North of Toronto, in York Region, Bayview is designated as York Regional Road 34. It is 46 km (29 mi) long.

== History ==
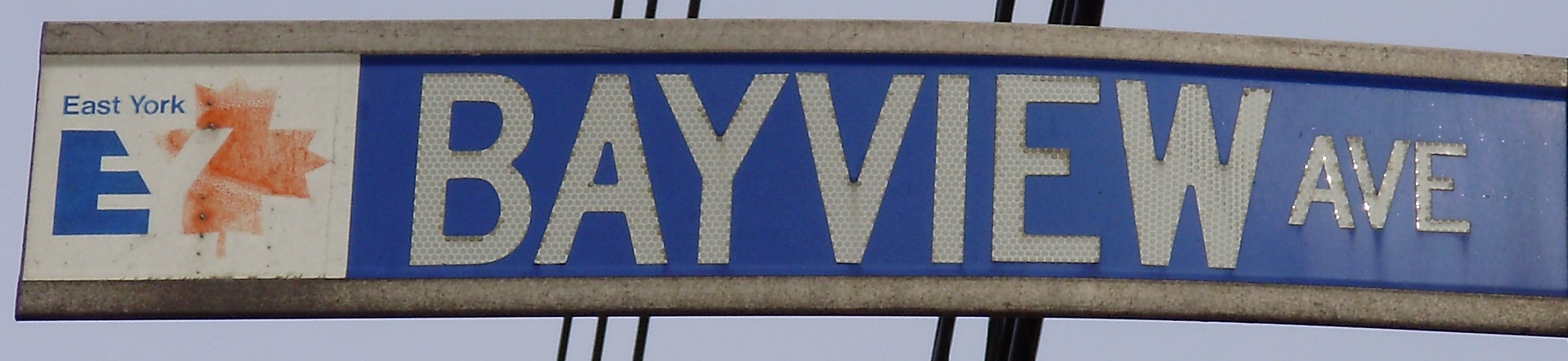
Old Bayview Ave. street sign in East York

Bayview Avenue follows the first concession line, laid 6,600 ft (2,000 m) east of Yonge Street. Over time, the concession road became known as East York Avenue, a reference to the division it formed between the city of Toronto and the township of East York. In 1931, James Stanley McLean constructed "Bay View" (now known as McLean House), a house overlooking the Don Valley with a view south down to Toronto Bay, on the edge of Moore Park and ultimately this led to the road becoming known as Bayview Avenue.

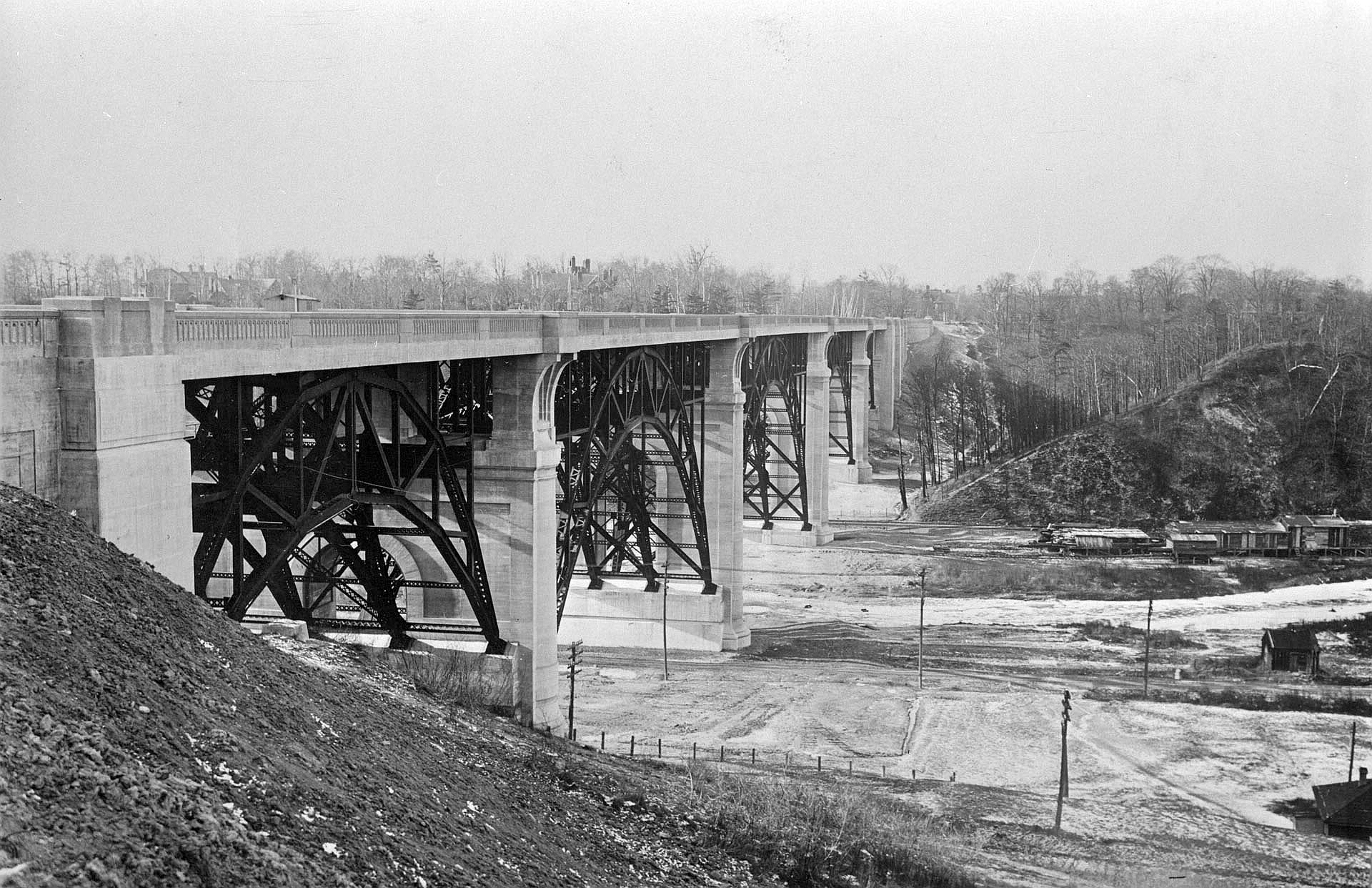
Bloor Street Viaduct looking from east side of Don Valley to west. To right of viaduct is "Sugarloaf Hill", which was removed to build the Bayview Extension.

In 1959, Bayview was extended south from Moore Avenue in Leaside to Front Street. The northern section of this extension was routed alongside Pottery Road to Nesbitt Drive. South of this, it wraps around a hill and descends into the Lower Don Valley, travelling parallel to the route of the Don Valley Parkway. This addition is frequently referred to as the Bayview Extension. It was constructed as part of the Don Valley Parkway project, and necessitated the removal of "Sugarloaf Hill" directly north of the Bloor Street Viaduct. The extension fulfilled the "central spoke" in the building of the "Don Valley Roadway" as proposed in the 1940s. A route through the ravine to St. Clair Avenue was replaced with the present route which stays within the Don Valley proper. With the creations of the Corktown Commons park in 2013, the southern end of Bayview was extended a short distance and now terminates at Mill Street.

The list of streets removed or used to create the extension included:

- Don Roadway West – from Front Street to Winchester Street
- Marriott – from north of Bloor Street beginning at Park Drive (now Park Drive Reservation Trail)

In the late 1990s, York Region conducted several road needs studies near Lake Wilcox, which determined that the disjointed and disconnected Bayview Avenue should be connected from Stouffville Road in the south to Bloomington Road in the north. A lengthy battle ensued between environmentalists, upset over continuing construction in the supposedly protected Oak Ridges Moraine. The discovery of Jefferson salamanders in the study area resulted in several modifications to the design of the route, including a 70 m (230 ft) structure over a dry ravine, as well as five amphibian tunnels. On November 17, 2002, the new extension was opened, including a widened intersection at Stouffville Road. The former route of Bayview was turned into several short streets (Olde Bayview Avenue, Sunset Beach Road and Bayview Park Lane), which lie directly west of the new roadway.

Bayview Avenue was once proposed to be renamed Kilgour Avenue by the town of Leaside, after Joseph Kilgour, whose widow sold his farm, Sunnybrook, to the city of Toronto on the condition that it never be developed. Today, Sunnybrook Hospital and Sunnybrook Park occupy those lands. While Bayview was never renamed, a side street south of the hospital carries the name Kilgour Road today.

== Route description ==
The southern end of Bayview Avenue starts at Withrow St in Ward's Island near the city ferry terminal. On the mainland, it starts at Mill Street in Toronto's Corktown Common. For the first part of its route northward it runs through the Don Valley, on the West side of the river opposite the Don Valley Parkway. Along this stretch a steep cliff separates it from neighbourhoods such as Cabbagetown.

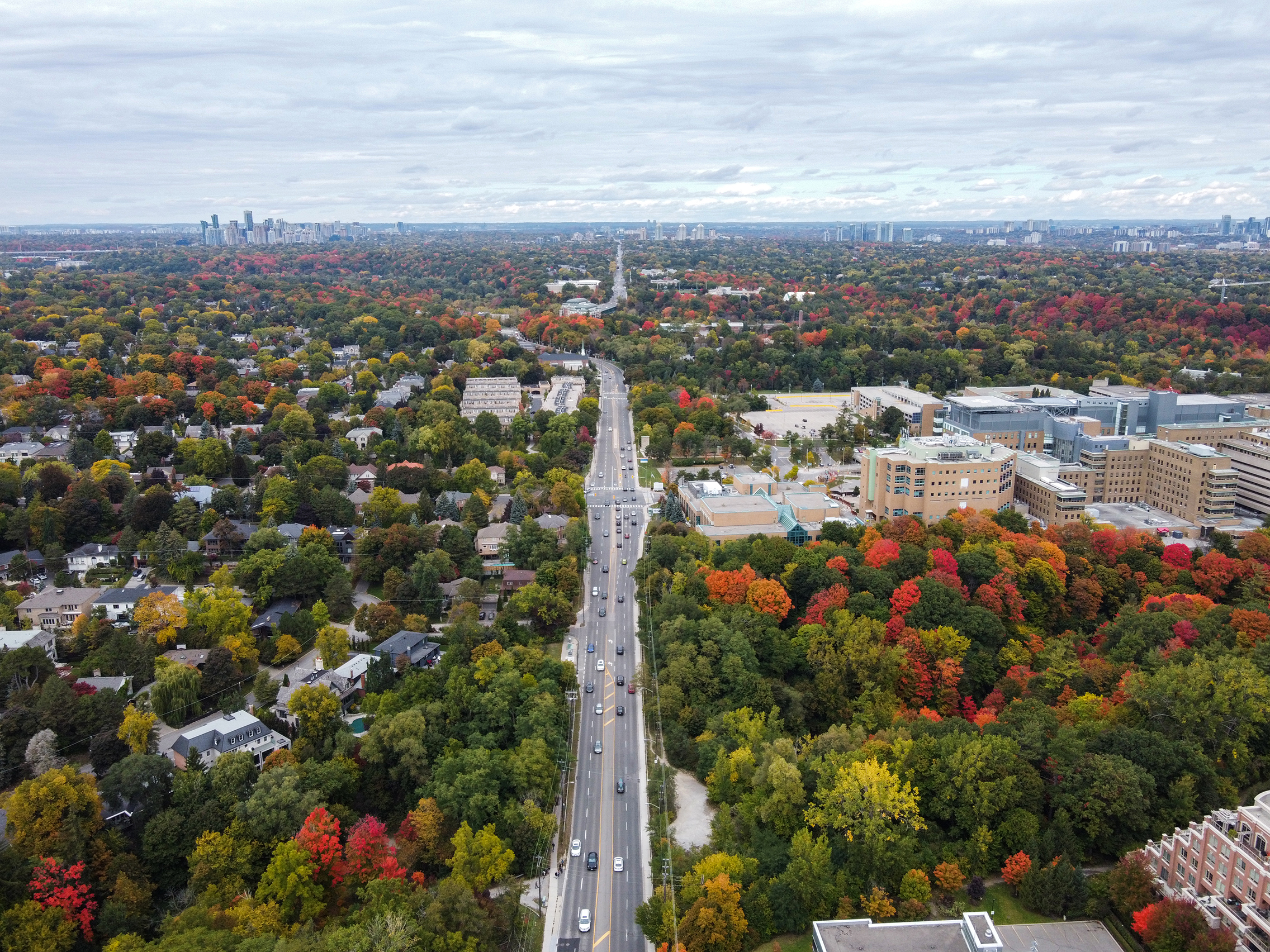
Bayview Avenue looking north from Sunnydene Park

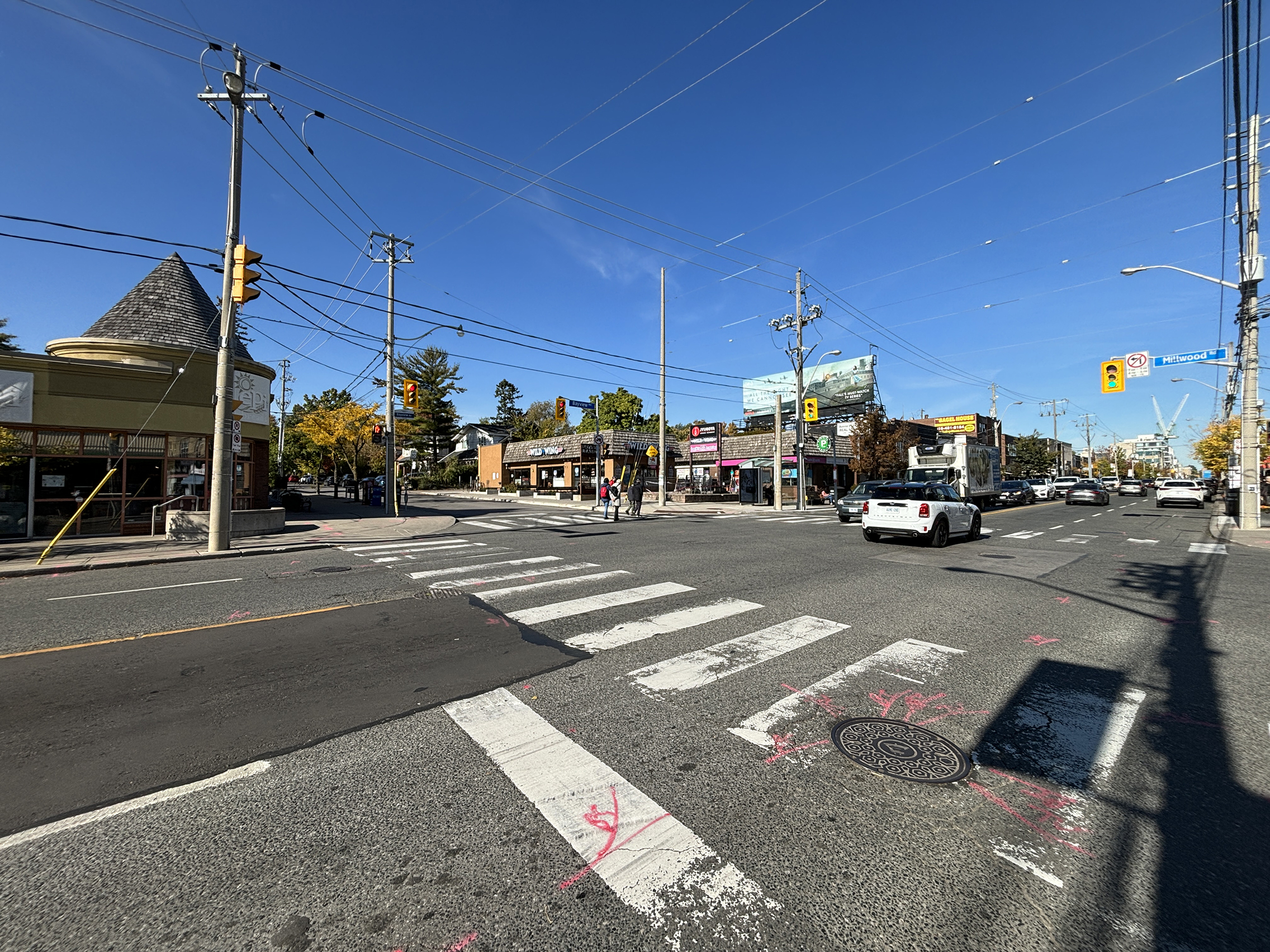
View of the west side of Bayview Avenue at Millwood Road in 2023

Bayview exits the Don Valley, passing through the Governor's Bridge neighbourhood and entering Leaside. It is the major commercial street for Leaside, home to many small shops and restaurants. North of Leaside Bayview runs across several tributaries of the Don River and is carried over one of them by the six-lane Bayview Bridge. This is the western portion of the wealthy Lawrence Park neighbourhood, and just to the east is the Bridle Path, the single wealthiest area of Toronto. A number of major institutions are found in this area including Sunnybrook Health Sciences Centre, Glendon College, Toronto French School, The Granite Club, The Crescent School, and the Bob Rumball Centre for the Deaf.

North of York Mills Avenue Bayview becomes one of the major north–south arterials for suburban North York. It passes through the neighbourhoods of Bayview Village, Bayview Woods, Willowdale, and Newtonbrook.

It runs north beyond Steeles Avenue, Toronto's northern city limit, and continues north through York Region, where it is designated and signposted as York Regional Road 34. It is one of the main arteries for the Thornhill district of Markham (between Steeles and Highway 7) and Richmond Hill. It then passes through the Oak Ridges Moraine, passing a number of parks and conservation areas. North of the moraine the street again enters urban areas, passing through Aurora and Newmarket. It ends in Newmarket where it turns into Prospect Street.

Bayview Avenue is also home to major places of worship of almost every major religious tradition including synagogues, an Islamic mosque, the city's largest evangelical churches, Canada's largest Buddhist Temple, Toronto's largest Eastern Orthodox cathedral, and Canada's only Zoroastrian Temple. These can all be found along a 15-kilometre section of the road.

== Public Transit ==
The Toronto Transit Commission (TTC) bus route that services most of the length of Bayview Avenue within Toronto is the 11 Bayview, with the 28 Bayview South running south of it. Route 28 had originally been 28 Davisville, but it was modified in 2014. It now has full albeit less frequent service than the 11 Bayview route. From 2008 to 2014, the route ran its rush hour route on weekdays, then to the Brick Works during the day on weekends. In York Region, York Region Transit (YRT) runs Routes 54 and 91, with Route 91 and its branch routes serving the portion of Bayview south of Oak Ridges, and Route 54 serving Aurora and Newmarket.

The routes mainly serving Bayview Avenue are:

Toronto (TTC):

Route		Direction and Termini			
11A	Bayview	SB	To Davisville station	NB	To Steeles Avenue
11C	Bayview	SB	To Davisville station	NB	To Sunnybrook
28	Bayview South	SB	To Davisville station	NB	To Don Valley Brick Works

There are also two TTC subway stations located on Bayview at Eglinton and Sheppard Avenues: Leaside and Bayview, with the former being on Line 5 Eglinton and the latter on Line 4 Sheppard.

York Region (YRT):

Route		Direction and Termini			
54	Bayview	SB	To Yonge and Wellington	NB	To East Gwillimbury GO Station
91	Bayview	SB	To Finch GO Bus Terminal	NB	To Subrisco Ave. (South of 19th Ave.)
91B	Bayview	SB	To Richmond Hill Centre Terminal	NB	To Oak Ridges
391	Bayview Express	SB	To Finch GO Bus Terminal	NB	Subrisco Ave. 391 only operates southbound during AM peak hours

== Landmarks ==
Landmark	Cross street	Notes	Image
Queen Street Viaduct	Queen St E		
Prince Edward Viaduct	Bloor St	Bayview runs under the viaduct	
Don Valley Brick Works	Pottery Road		
Crothers Woods	Nesbitt Dr		
Mount Pleasant Cemetery	Moore Ave	Bayview forms the eastern boundary of Canada's largest cemetery	
St Cuthbert's Anglican Church	McRae Dr		
Leaside station	Eglinton Ave	Station on Line 5 Eglinton	
St. Augustine of Canterbury Anglican	Broadway Ave		
Mount Hope Catholic Cemetery	Kilgour Rd		
CNIB	Kilgour Rd		
Sunnybrook Health Sciences Centre	Blythwood Rd		
Lawrence Park Community Church	Dawlish Ave		
Glendon College	Lawrence Ave E	Campus of York University	
Toronto French School	Lawrence Ave E		
Bayview Bridge	Lawrence Ave E	Carries Bayview across the Don River (West Branch)	
The Granite Club	Lawrence Ave		
The Crescent School	Lawrence Ave		
Bob Rumball Centre for the Deaf	Post Rd		
Canadian Film Centre	Country Lane		
Trinity York Mills Presbyterian Church	Truman Rd		
Bayview station	Sheppard Ave	Station on Line 4 Sheppard	
Bayview Village Shopping Centre	Sheppard Ave		
All Saints Greek Orthodox Church	Byng Ave		
Blessed Trinity Parish	Finch Ave		
St. Joseph's Morrow Park Catholic Secondary School / Tyndale University College and Seminary	Cummer Ave		
Thornhill Community Centre	John St		
Shouldice Hernia Centre	Green Lane		
Thornlea Secondary School	Willowbrook Rd		
Toronto Montessori Schools	Highway 7		
Bayview Secondary School	Major Mackenzie Dr		
Jean Vanier Catholic High School	Crosby Ave/Redstone Rd		
Holy Trinity School	19th Ave		
Wilcox Lake	Bethesda Side Road		
Pickering College	Mulock Dr		

== See also ==
- Bayview Ghost
