= Bayview Bridge (Toronto) =

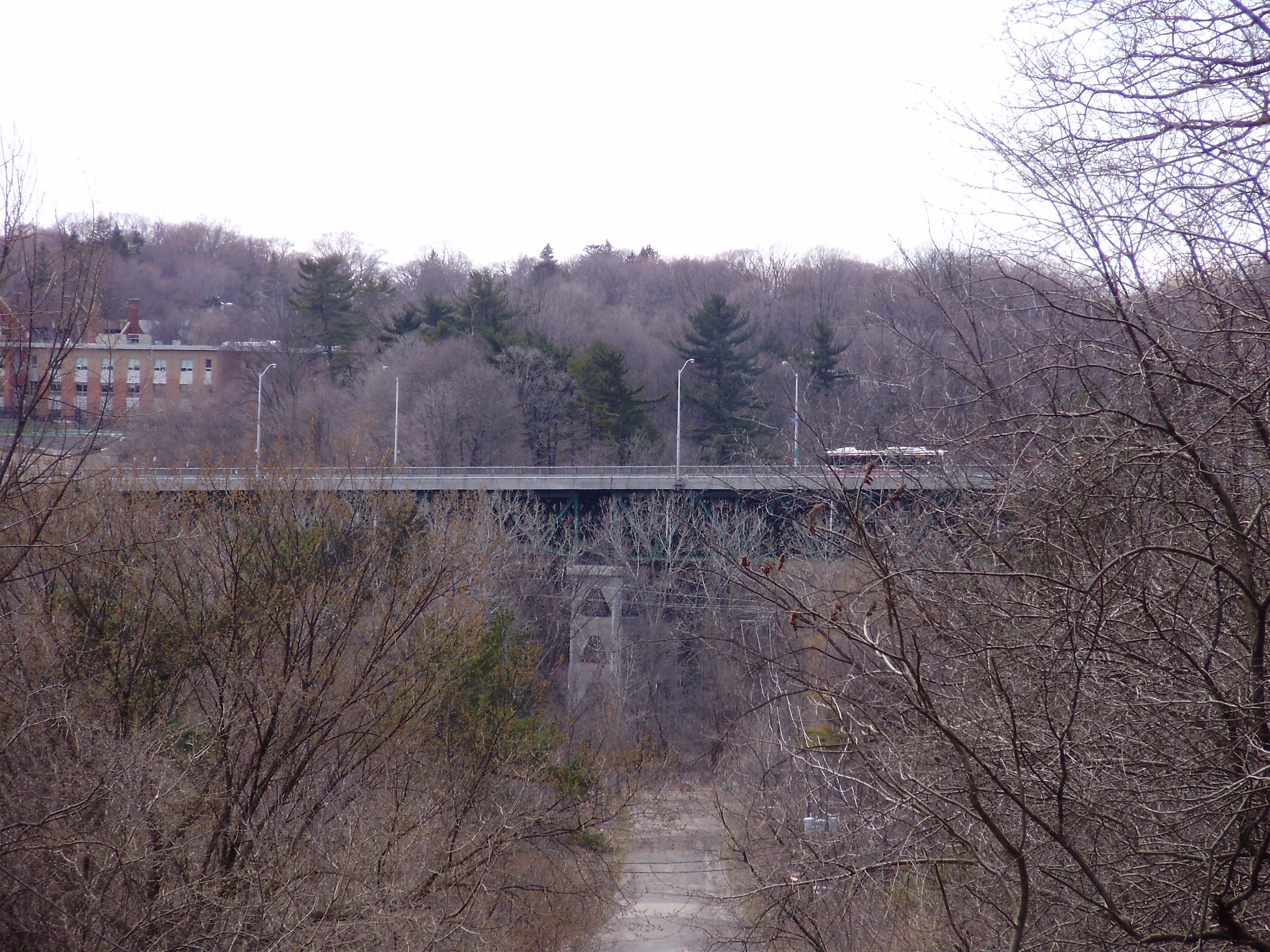
- Coordinates: 43°43′49″N 79°22′53″W
- Carries: 6 lanes of Bayview Avenue
- Crosses: West Don River
- Locale: Toronto, Ontario, Canada
- Maintained by: Toronto Transportation Services

Characteristics
- Design: Deck truss bridge
- Total length: 350 metres
- Clearance below: West Branch of the Don River

History
- Designer: unknown
- Engineering design by: Margison and Babcock
- Opened: 1929

Statistics
- Toll: No

Location
- Interactive map of Bayview Bridge

The Bayview Bridge is a deck truss bridge over the West Don River in Toronto, Ontario, Canada. The six-lane bridge carries Bayview Avenue across the Don Valley, connecting with Lawrence Avenue East at its southern end. Opened in 1961 it replaced the now demolished high level bridge from 1929, the bridge helped spur the development of the Bridle Path, an affluent neighbourhood northeast of the bridge's span. From the eastern end of Lawrence the old low level or Watson’s Bridge built in 1895 which followed the old alignment of Bayview.

Restoration work on the bridge was done in 1969 and 1994 by Metro Transportation (shown on plaque along the middle of the bridge).

The bridge is also used as part of the detour route for traffic moving east to Lawrence Avenue East (via Post Road and Bridle Path) or west to Lawrence Avenue West. Lawrence Avenue East section west of Park Lane Circle ends at the eastern side of the bridge

Areas near the bridge:

- York University Glendon College
- Toronto French School
- Granite Club
- CNIB
- Crescent School
