= Bridle Path–Sunnybrook–York Mills =

Sunnybrook
- Neighbourhood
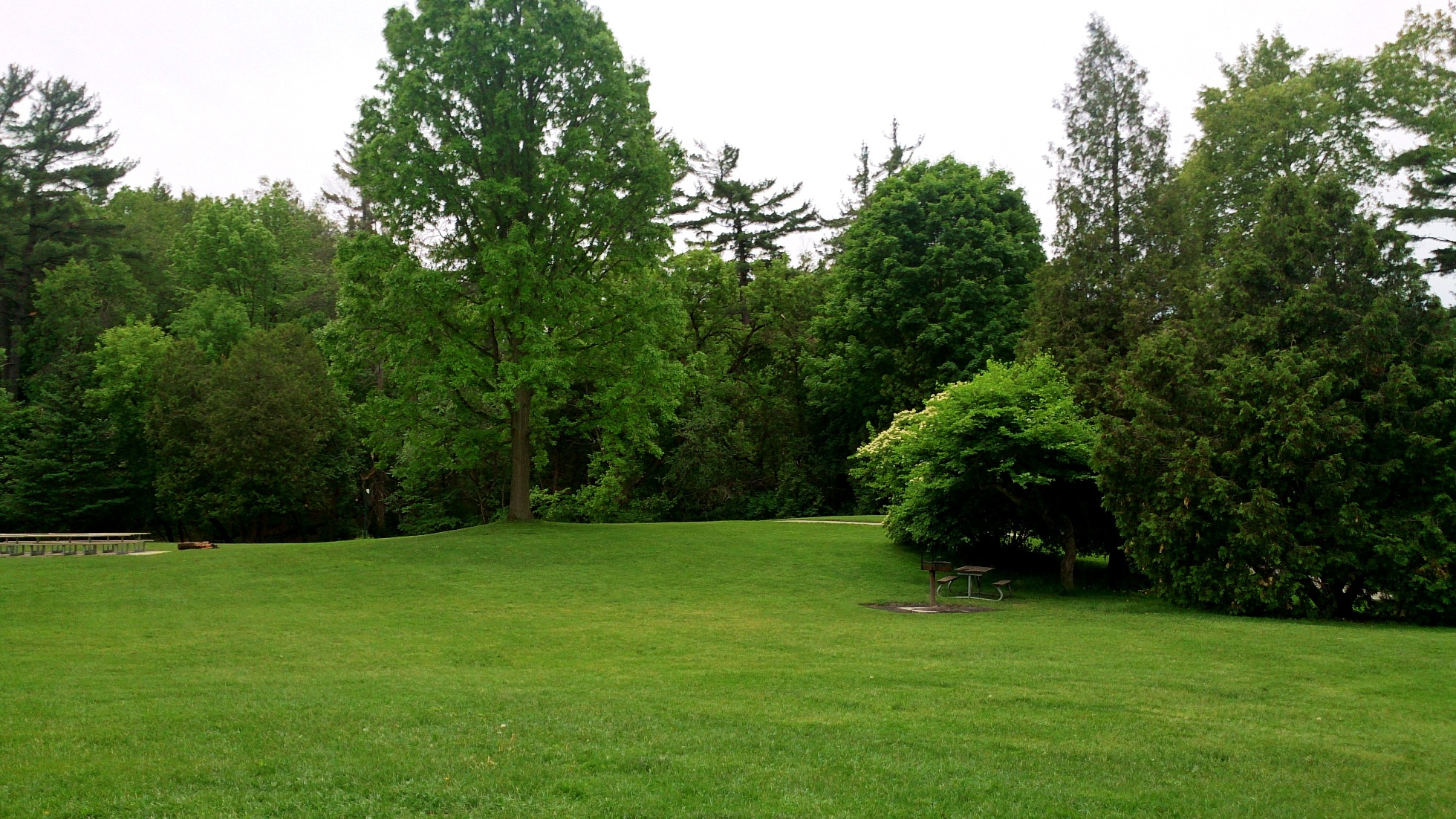
- View of Sunnybrook Park in 2014
- Interactive map of Sunnybrook
- Coordinates: 43°43′16″N 79°22′40″W
- Country: Canada
- Province: Ontario
- City: Toronto
- Community: North York
- Changed Municipality: 1922 North York from York; 1998 Toronto from North York

Government
  - MP: Rob Oliphant (Don Valley West)
  - MPP: Stephanie Bowman (Don Valley West)
  - Councillor: Rachel Chernos Lin (Ward 15 Don Valley West)

Population (2016)
  - Total: 9,266
  - Density: 1,040/km^{2} (2,700/sq mi)

Bridle Path–Sunnybrook–York Mills is a municipal and census district in Toronto, Ontario, Canada, and it is the name officially designated by Toronto City Hall. Traditionally, Torontonians regard this area as five distinct neighbourhoods that were formerly in North York before it was amalgamated into Toronto in 1998. The area is part of the federal and provincial electoral district of Don Valley West, and Toronto electoral ward 25: Don Valley West (North).

== Overview ==
The district can be viewed as four separate quadrants: the northwest quadrant is the southern part of York Mills, particularly the district's northwest corner (which is the separate neighbourhood of Hoggs Hollow); the northeast quadrant (south of Wilket Road) is the Bridle Path; the southwest quadrant includes portions of the former communities of Lawrence Park (north of Blythwood Ravine in Sherwood Park) and North Toronto (south of Sherwood Park); and the southeast quadrant is occupied by Sunnybrook Park.

The area has an irregular and complex boundary. It is bordered on the north by York Mills Road. The west border begins in the north by following Yonge Street southward until it intersects with Yonge Boulevard, at which point it turns east and follows the North York border for the remainder of the district's east and south borders, into the Don River valley, then turning south and following an imaginary line which bisects the communities (Lawrence Park and North Toronto) between Yonge Street and Bayview Avenue all the way to Fairfield Road (two blocks north of Eglinton Avenue East). The south border begins here, and follows Fairfield to Bayview, then follows Bayview northward briefly to just north of Glenvale Boulevard at the grounds of the CNIB (Canadian National Institute for the Blind), at which point it once again follows an imaginary line that is also the border of North York, running east along the north boundary of residences on the north side of Glenvale, and into Sunnybrook Park, to the point where Wilket Creek terminates and runs into the Don River. The district's east border is Wilket Creek.

== Demographics ==
Median Household Income	1996	2001	2006	2011	2016
Bridle Path–Sunnybrook–York Mills	$137,947	$174,967	$208,312	$161,448 (after tax)	$215,798
City of Toronto	–	–	$52,833	$52,149 (after tax)	$65,829

Major ethnic populations (2016):

- 69.2% White; 21.1% English, 16.5% Scottish
- 15.6% Chinese
- 4.0% South Asian; 3.1% Indian
- 1.3% Black
