= Sunnybrook =

Sunnybrook may refer to:

== Canada ==
- Sunnybrook, Alberta, a hamlet
- Sunnybrook Health Sciences Centre, also known as Sunnybrook in Toronto, Ontario
- Sunnybrook Research Institute, the research arm of Sunnybrook Health Sciences Centre
- Bridle Path–Sunnybrook–York Mills, a census district in Toronto

== New Zealand ==
- Sunnybrook, Bay of Plenty, a suburb of Rotorua

== United States ==
- Bride's Hill, Wheeler, Alabama, a historic house also known as Sunnybrook, listed on the NRHP in Alabama
- Sunnybrook, California
- Sunnybrook, Wayne County, Kentucky
- Sunnybrook (Covington, Louisiana), listed on the NRHP in Louisiana
- Sunnybrook (Lower Pottsgrove Township, Pennsylvania), listed on the NRHP in Pennsylvania

== See also ==
- Sunnybrook Park (disambiguation)
- Rebecca of Sunnybrook Farm – American 1903 children's novel by Kate Douglas Wiggin
