= Bayview station (Toronto) =

Toronto subway station

Bayview
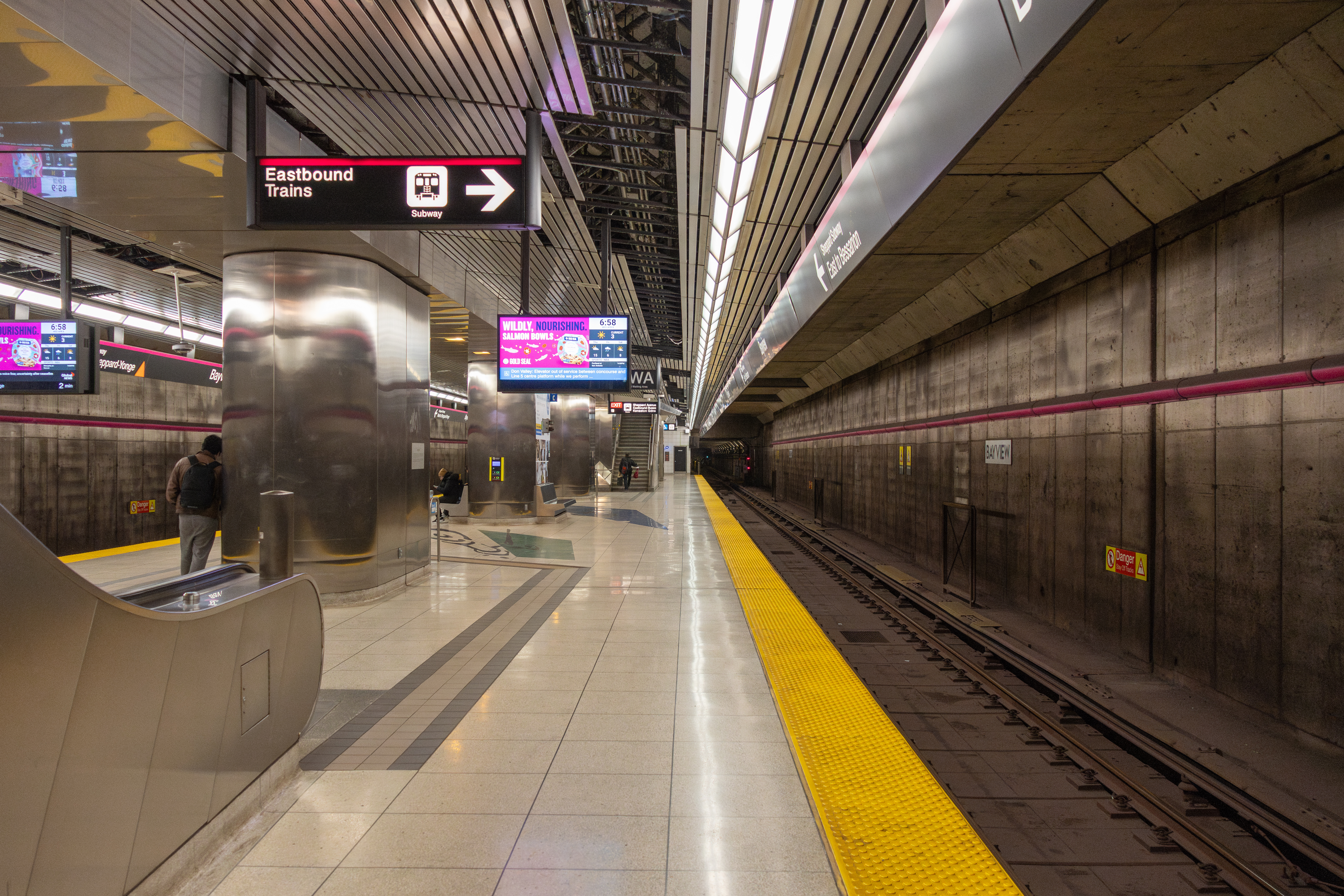

General information
- Location: 550 Sheppard Avenue East, Toronto, Ontario; Canada
- Coordinates: 43°46′00″N 79°23′15″W
- Platforms: Centre platform
- Tracks: 2
- Connections: TTC buses: 11 Bayview; 185 Sheppard Central; 385 Sheppard East

Construction
- Structure type: Underground
- Accessible: Yes
- Architect: Stevens Group Architects

Other information
- Website: Official station page

History
- Opened: November 24, 2002; 23 years ago

Passengers
- 2023–2024: 6,205
- Rank: 62 of 70

Services
Preceding station	Toronto Transit Commission	Following station
Sheppard–Yonge Terminus	Line 4 Sheppard	Bessarion towards Don Mills
Location

Bayview is a station on Line 4 Sheppard of the Toronto subway. It is located at 550 Sheppard Avenue East, at Bayview Avenue. It opened in 2002.

== History ==
Bayview opened on November 24, 2002, along with the other stations on Line 4 Sheppard.

In 2013, the TTC announced plans for a second Bayview station on Line 5 Eglinton. This station was renamed Leaside in January 2016.

== Station description ==
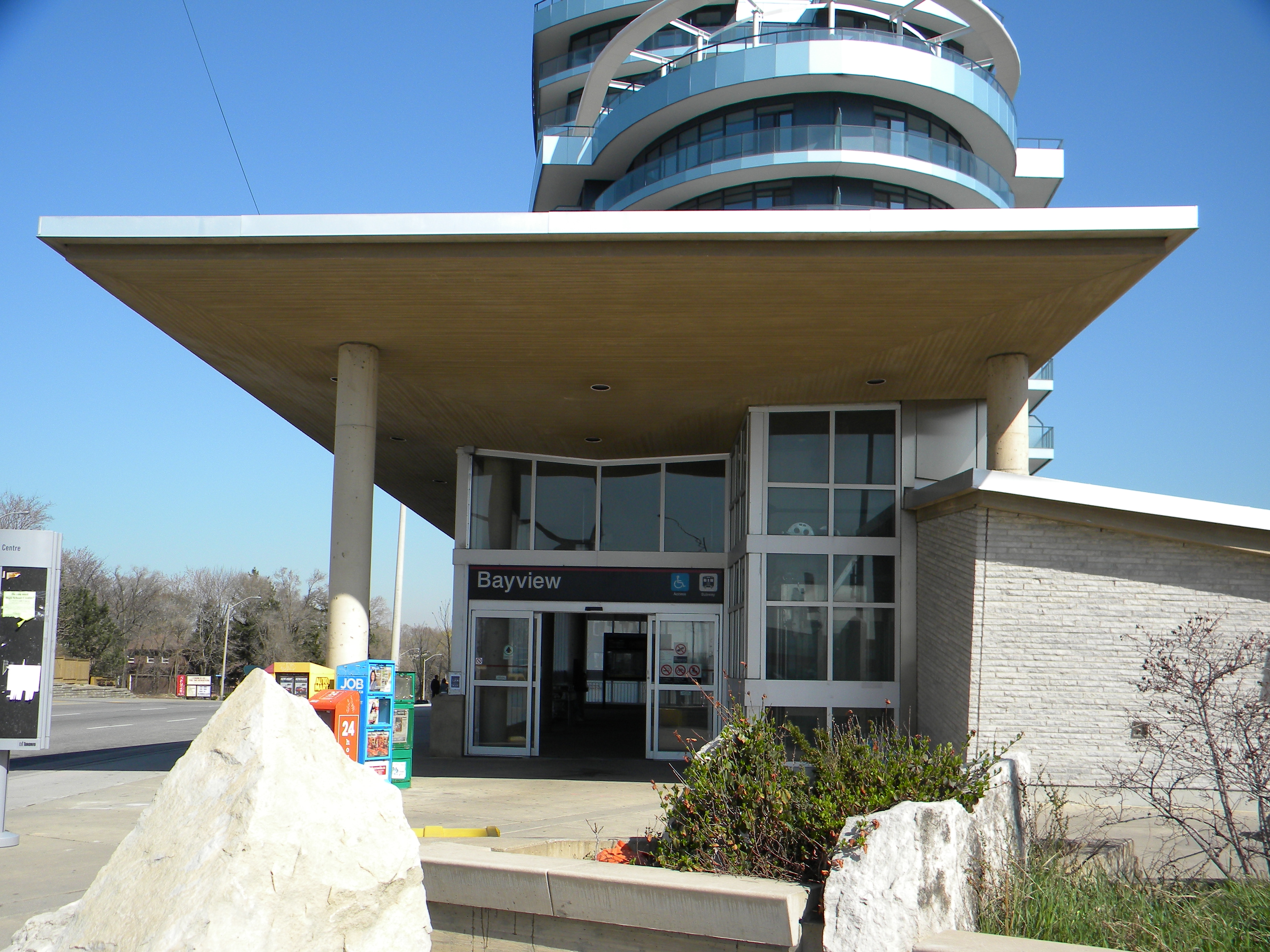
Main station entrance

Like all the other stations on the Sheppard line, Bayview is fully accessible. The main entrance on the northeast corner of Sheppard Avenue and Bayview Avenue is fully accessible, with elevator, escalator, and stair access to the west concourse level, where another elevator connects to the subway platform level. A second automatic entrance at the southeast corner of the intersection is also fully accessible, providing elevator, escalator, and stair access to the east concourse level. There is also a third entrance at the northwest corner of the intersection that is not accessible.

== Architecture and art ==
Stevens Group Architects designed the station with Walter Construction being the general contractor. The high-ceilinged entrance pavilion, characterized by extensive glazing and angled roofs overhanging the structure, evokes mid-century architecture.

The station is home to a public art installation titled From Here Right Now. Created by Toronto-based artist Panya Clark Espinal and installed by Gem Campbell Terrazzo & Tile, it features 24 anamorphic illustrations of everyday objects – such as a ladder, pocketwatch, apple, and stairway – strategically placed across the station's walls and floors. This artwork led travel magazine BootsnAll to include Bayview station in their list of the world's 15 most beautiful subway stops in 2011.

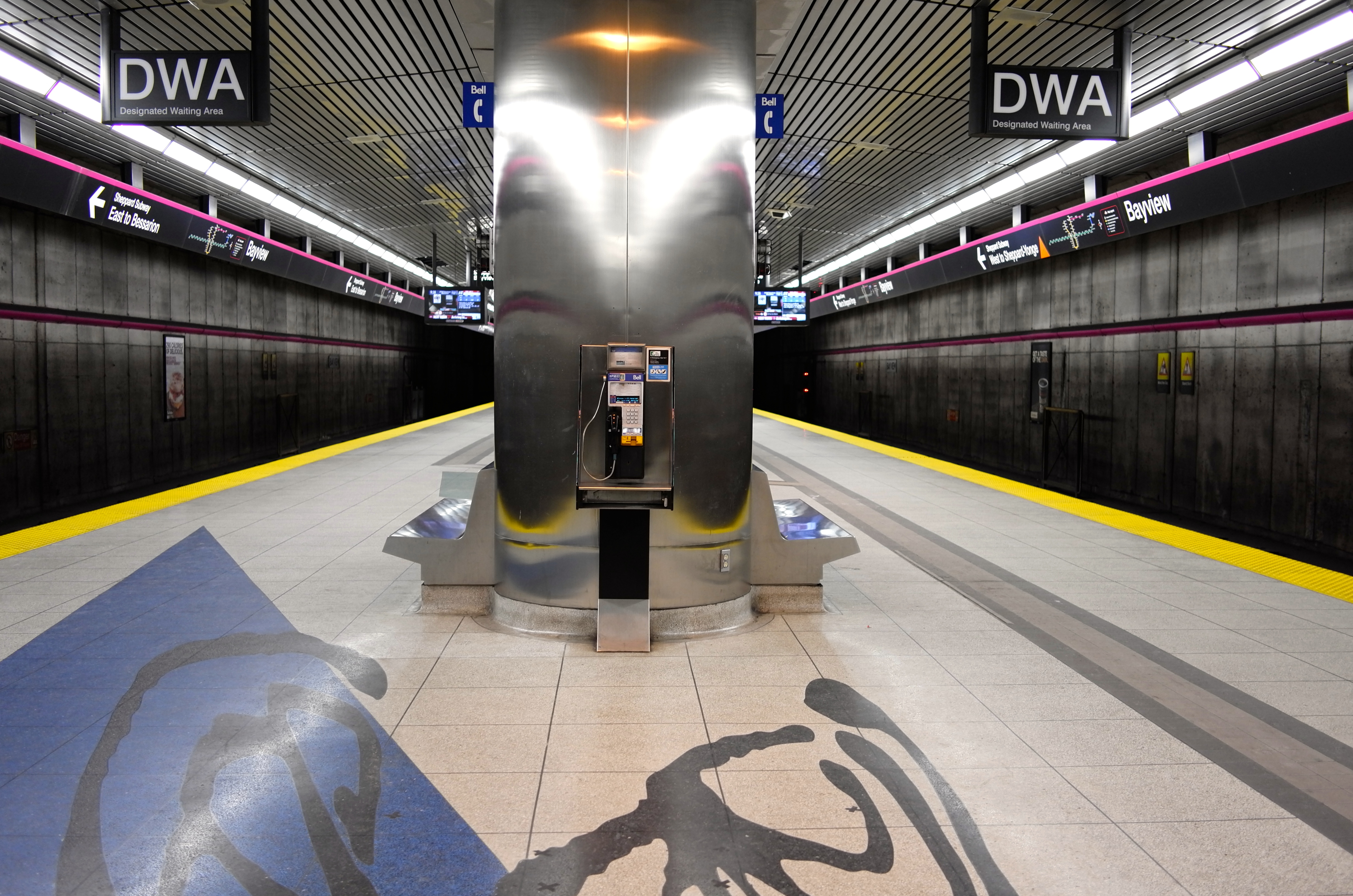
Art on platform floor

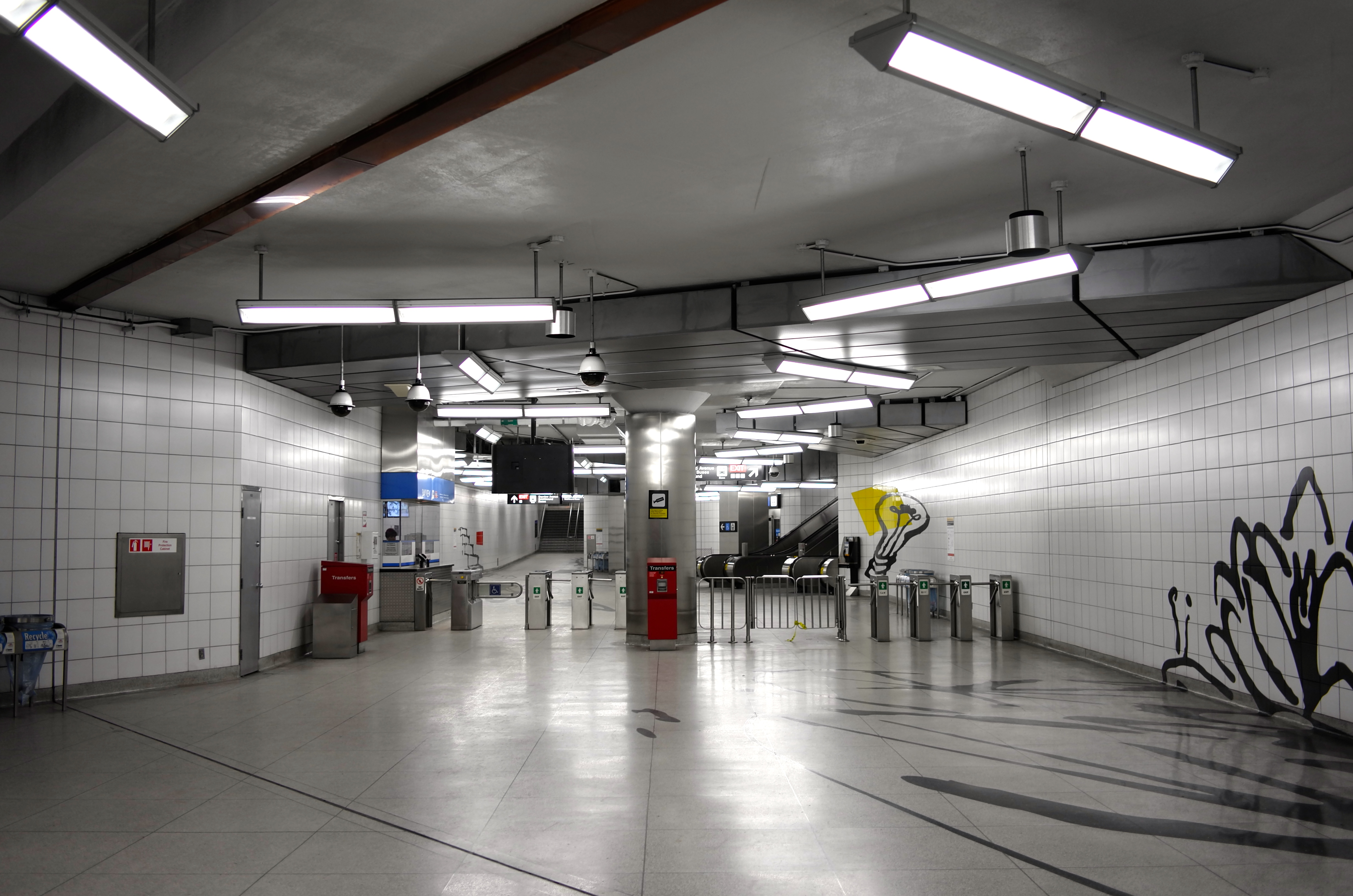
Art at concourse level

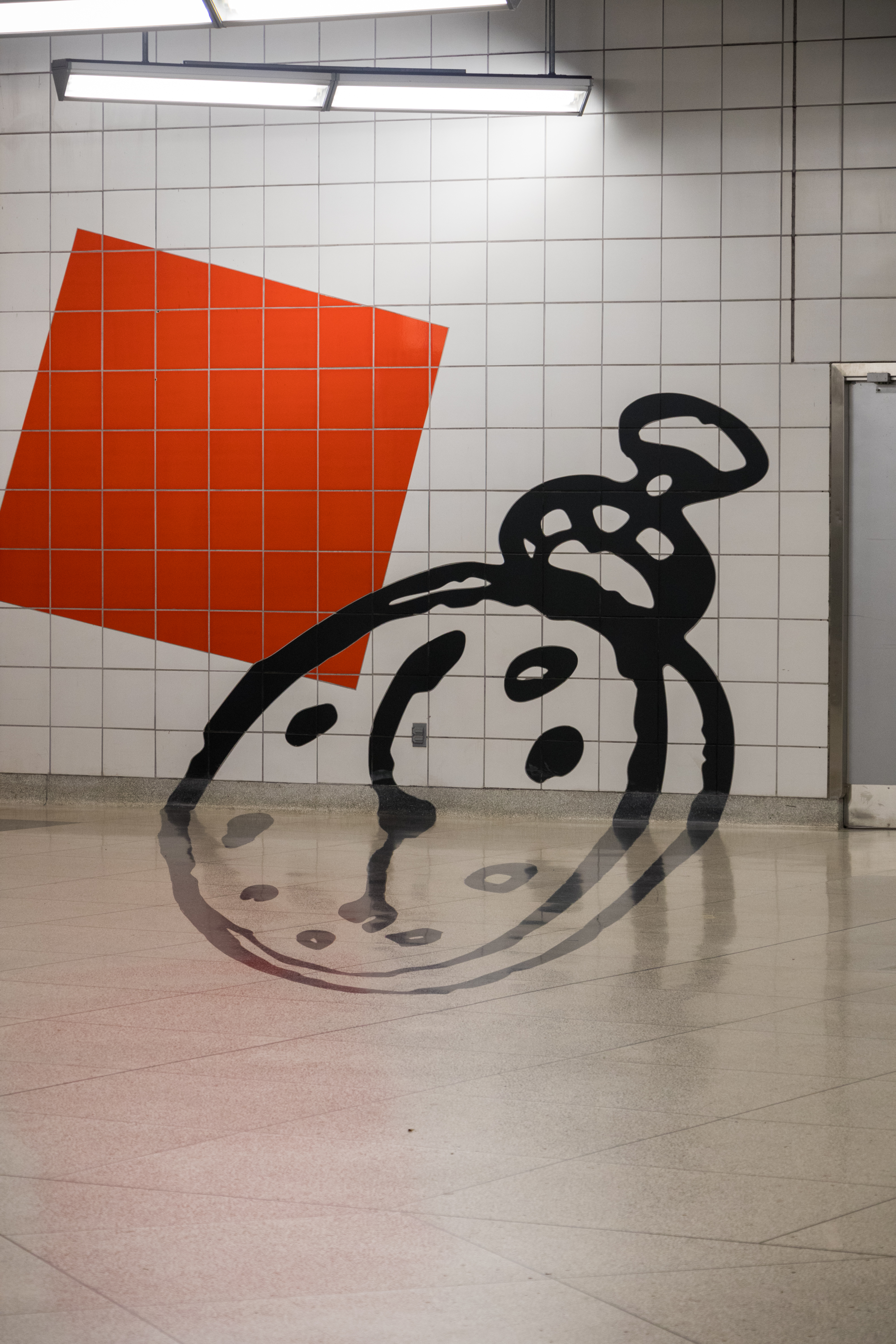
Art on the floor and wall

== Subway infrastructure in the vicinity ==
The station itself was built by cut-and-cover but east of the station the tracks continue through dual bored tunnels toward Bessarion station, while west of the station similar tunnels go to Sheppard–Yonge station, where the tracks cross over the Line 1 Yonge–University tracks.

== Nearby landmarks ==
Nearby landmarks include the Bayview Village Shopping Centre and the Kenaston Gardens YMCA; the YMCA features an entrance directly beside the station. However, there is no indoor access to the subway from either the shopping centre or the YMCA.

== Surface connections ==
A transfer is needed to connect to all bus routes at the curbside stops located directly outside the station.

TTC routes serving the station include:

Route	Name	Additional information
11A	Bayview	Northbound to Steeles Avenue East and southbound to Davisville station via Sunnybrook Hospital
185	Sheppard Central	Westbound to Sheppard–Yonge station and eastbound to Don Mills station
385	Sheppard East	Blue Night service; westbound to Sheppard–Yonge station and eastbound to Rouge Hill GO Station
