= Catholic Schools United Nations Assembly =

The Catholic Students United Nations Assembly (CSUNA), is a simulation of the United Nations that catapults students into the world of diplomacy and negotiation. CSUNA is hosted by St. Joseph's Morrow Park every year. As one of the largest Model United Nations conferences in Canada, it holds over 500 student delegates all over the Toronto Catholic District School Board. The student "delegates" draft resolutions, plot strategy, negotiate with supporters and adversaries, resolve conflicts and navigate the UN's rules of procedures with all in the interest to resolve problems that affect almost every country in the world. CSUNA holds its conferences every year in the month of November at the CEC (Catholic Education Center) over the span of three days.

== CSUNA Secretariat ==
- Secretary General
- Chairs of the General Assembly (GA)
- Chairs of the Commission on African Union (AU)
- Chairs of the World Health Organization (WHO)
- Chairs of the Economic and Social Committee (ECOSOC)
- Chairs of the Human Rights Committee (HR)
- Chairs of the North Atlantic Treaty Organization (NATO)
- Chair of the Security Council (SC)
- Head of Media
- Head of Security
- Head of Pages
- Webmaster
- Shadows
