= Bayview Woods-Steeles =

Coordinates: 43.797°N 79.383°W

- Neighbourhood
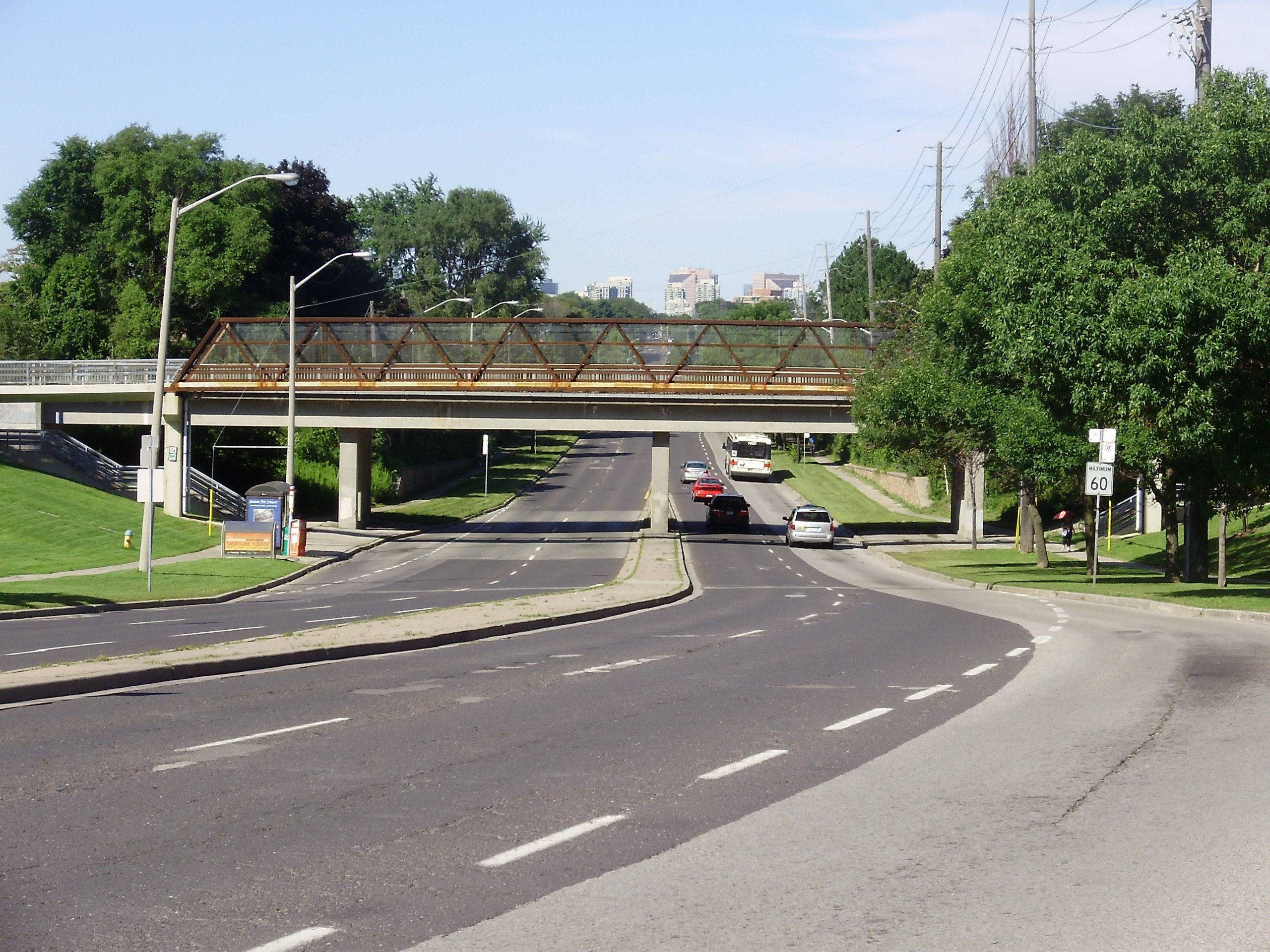
- View from Finch Avenue, looking west from Leslie Street.

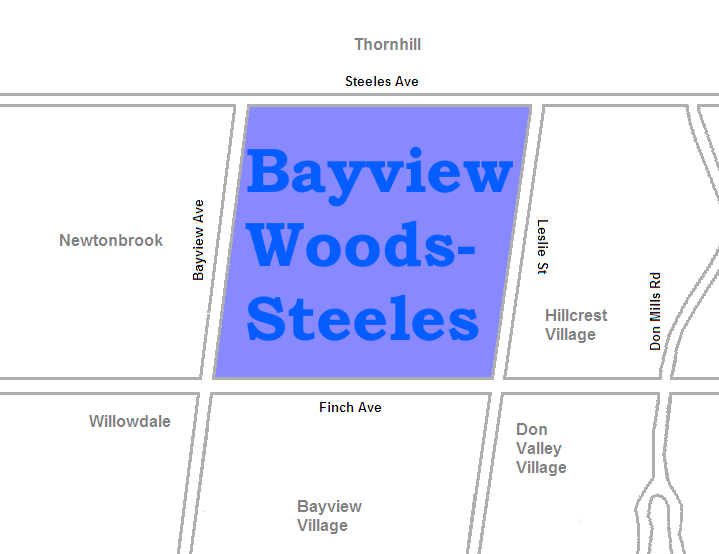
- Country: Canada
- Province: Ontario
- City: Toronto
- Municipality established: 1850 York Township
- Changed municipality: 1922 North York from York Township
- Changed municipality: 1998 Toronto from North York

Bayview Woods-Steeles is a neighbourhood located in the northern tip of the city of Toronto, Ontario, Canada in the district of North York. It is part of federal and provincial electoral district Don Valley North, and Toronto electoral ward 17: Don Valley North. In 2006, it had a population of 13,295. The area is divided by a series of ravines, and is often not considered a neighbourhood unto itself. Rather the sections are more often divided between the neighbouring areas of Hillcrest Village, Bayview Village, and Newtonbrook.

The neighbourhood is bordered by Steeles Avenue East to the north, Leslie Street to the east, Bayview Avenue to the west, and Finch Avenue East to the south. Several branches of the Don River meet in the middle of this neighbourhood and there is no shortage of greenspace as a result, though much is not usable, since it consists mostly of ravines. This neighbourhood is also notable for varying greatly in elevation, with the section in Cummer Avenue between Bayview and Leslie being especially steep.

== Demographics ==
Bayview Woods-Steeles is a middle-income neighbourhood with an equal amount of single detached homes as apartment buildings with 5+ stories. The ownership rate is close to 60% which is well over the average for the city. In 2006, 655 people had an income of $60,000 and above which increased only increased over the years. In 2011 there were 1035 people with an income of $60,000 and above living in the Bayview Woods-Steels neighbourhood, making this a middle-income neighbourhood.

There is a very large population of Chinese immigrants arriving each year and the neighbourhood is home to a large Chinese population (almost 30%). In 2006 there were 275 Chinese immigrants living in this neighbourhood and in 2011 there was a decrease of 25 people; there were 250 Chinese immigrants in the Bayview Woods-Steeles neighbourhood. There is also a strong Jewish community living in the area.

Bayview Woods-Steeles' major ethnic and cultural groups (by ancestry) in 2001:

- Chinese - 29%
- Jewish - 12%
- British Canadians - 10%; English - 7%; Scottish - 3%
- Canadian - 8%
- East Indian - 4%
- Korean - 4%
- Irish - 4%
- Iranian - 4%
- German - 2%
- Other - 23%

The percentage of population below the poverty line was 18% in 2001.

== Education ==
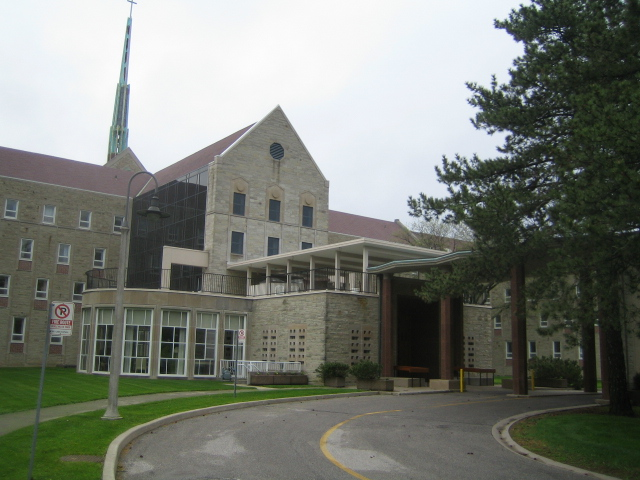
Tyndale University is a private post-secondary institution located in the neighbourhood.

Two public school boards operate schools in Bayview Woods – Steeles, the separate Toronto Catholic District School Board (TCDSB), and the secular Toronto District School Board (TDSB).

TDSB operates three primary education institutions, Steelesview Public School, Lester B. Pearson Elementary School, and Zion Heights Middle School. TDSB does not operate a school that provides secondary education in the neighbourhood, with TDSB secondary students residing in Bayview Woods – Steeles attending schools in adjacent neighbourhoods. Additionally, TCDSB operates one elementary school in the area, Blessed Trinity Catholic School, and one secondary school, St. Joseph's Morrow Park Catholic Secondary School .

The French first language public secular school board, Conseil scolaire Viamonde, and it separate counterpart, Conseil scolaire catholique MonAvenir also offer schooling to applicable residents of Bayview Woods – Steeles, although they do not operate a school in the neighbourhood. CSCM and CSV students attend schools situated in other neighbourhoods in Toronto.

In addition to primary and secondary institutions, Tyndale University is also located in the neighbourhood. Tyndale is a private post-secondary institution.

== Recreation ==
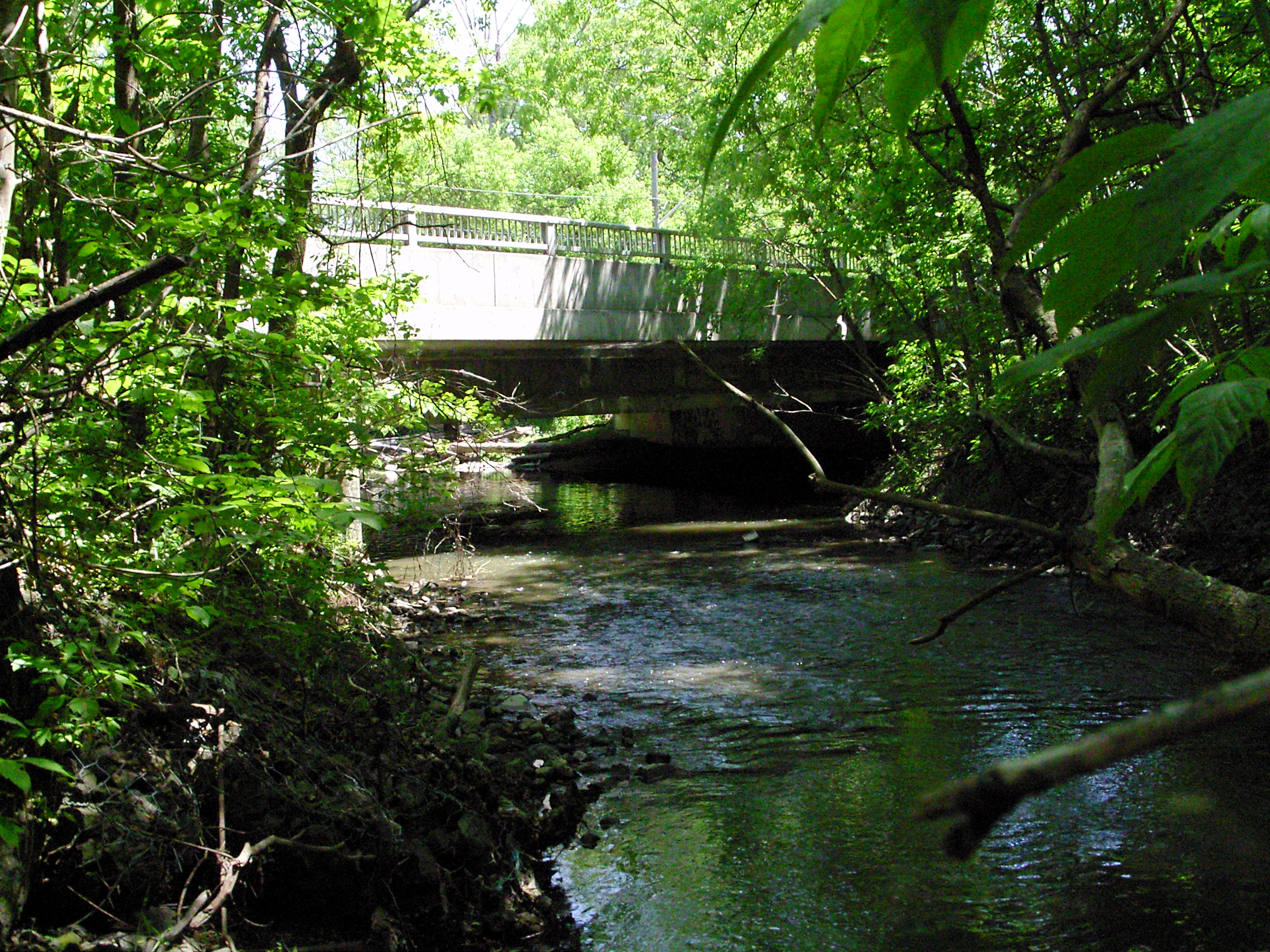
The Don River at Bayview Avenue. The river forms a part of the Toronto ravine system.

Several municipal parks are located in the Bayview Woods – Steeles, including Bestview Park, Cummer Park, Ruddington Park, Garnier Park, and Pineway Park. Several parks are situated near the Don Valley, a ravine network that bisects the neighbourhood. The valley forms a part of the Toronto ravine system. Municipal parks situated in the neighbourhood are managed by the Toronto Parks, Forestry and Recreation Division. In addition to municipal parks, the division also manages Cummer Park Community Centre, which has a swimming pool, an arena, and a skate park.

== Transportation ==
Several major roadways bound the neighbourhood including Steeles Avenue to the north, Finch Avenue to the south, and Bayview Avenue to the west.

Public transit in the neighbourhood is provided by the Toronto Transit Commission (TTC). The TTC operates several bus routes in the neighbourhood, 11 Bayview, 53 Steeles East, 42 Cummer, 39 Finch East and 51 Leslie. In addition to the TTC, bus routes operated by York Region Transit may be accessed in Bayview Woods – Steeles. The neighbourhood is home to one commuter railway station, Old Cummer GO Station. The station provides access to the Richmond Hill line, and is operated by GO Transit.
