= Bridle Path, Toronto =

Bridle Path
- Neighbourhood
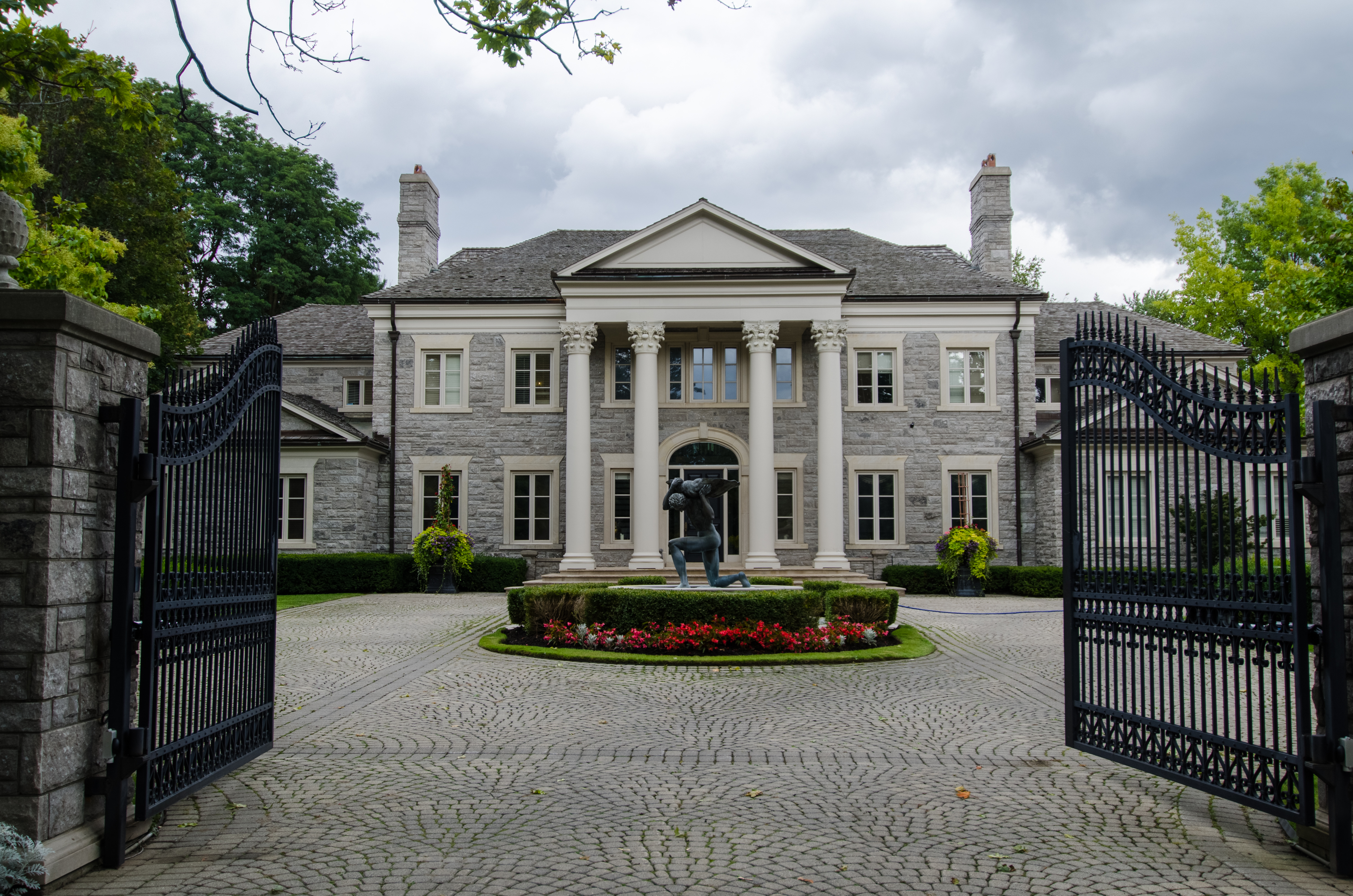
- A residence in the Bridle Path

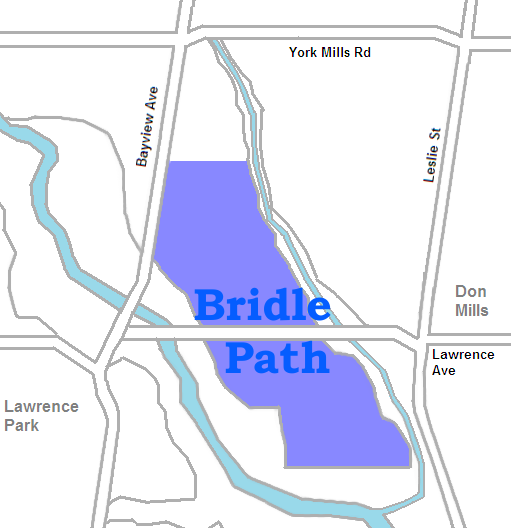
- Coordinates: 43.735°N 79.3733°W
- Country: Canada
- Province: Ontario
- City: Toronto
- Municipality established: 1850 York Township
- Changed municipality: 1922 North York from York Township
- Changed municipality: 1998 Toronto from North York

Government
  - MP: Rob Oliphant (Don Valley West)
  - MPP: Stephanie Bowman (Don Valley West)
  - Councillor: Rachel Chernos Lin (Ward 15 Don Valley West)

The Bridle Path is a residential neighbourhood in Toronto, Ontario, Canada. It is characterized by large multimillion-dollar mansions and two to four acre (8,000 to 16,000 m^{2}) lot sizes. It makes up part of Bridle Path–Sunnybrook–York Mills. Often referred to as "Millionaires' Row", as of 2014 it is the most affluent neighbourhood in Canada, with an average household income of $936,137, as well as by property values with an average dwelling value of $2.24M.

Although "The Bridle Path" is in fact the name of a road in the area, the term generally applies to the neighbourhood as a whole. It is bounded by The Bridle Path on the north, Sunnybrook Health Sciences Centre on the south, Bayview Avenue on the west and Wilket Creek on the east. Few roads pass through the area, which is surrounded by the Don River Valley and parklands.

== History ==
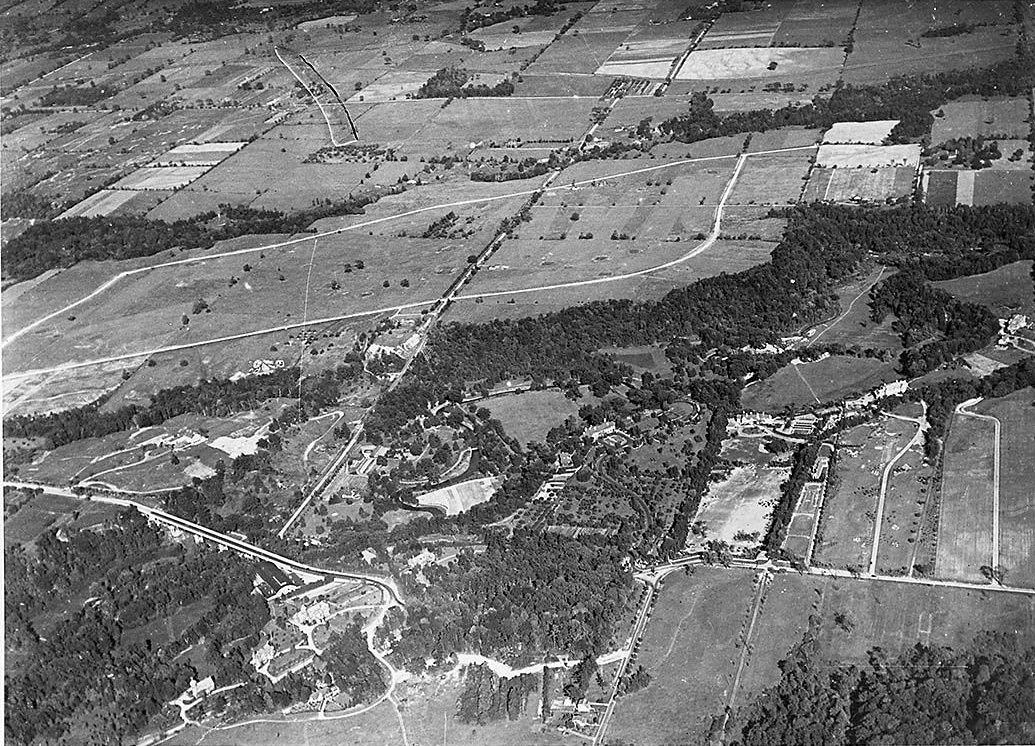
Bridle Path near Bayview Avenue, and Lawrence Avenue, c. 1930. The area was predominantly farmland in the early 20th century.

The Bridle Path was little more than farmland until 1929, when the Bayview Bridge was constructed across the steep (West Branch) Don River Valley. It was at that point that the area was first considered for residential development. Forsey Page, a Toronto-based land developer, envisioned the Bridle Path as an "exclusive enclave of estate homes" and he built the neighbourhood's first home, a Cape Cod Colonial style home at 2 The Bridle Path. This house is credited as the catalyst for the development of the neighbourhood.

In 1937, developer E.P. Taylor, who designed the Don Mills community, purchased a large plot of land north of the Bridle Path. The estate, named Windfields by his wife, is occupied today by the Canadian Film Centre. The park through which Wilket Creek flows behind this parcel of land is known as Windfields Park. In the late forties, Taylor's business partner George Montegu Black, Jr (father of Conrad Black) moved into the area and built a large mansion on Park Lane Circle. In an effort to control who his future neighbours would be, Black took over the company that owned the rolling farmland that was to become the Bridle Path, and set restrictions in place through the North York zoning by-law; only single-family dwellings could be built, and only on minimum lot sizes of 2 acres (0.81 ha). The area was subdivided into about 50 lots, each selling for $25,000 at the time, and through the Fifties it began to take shape.

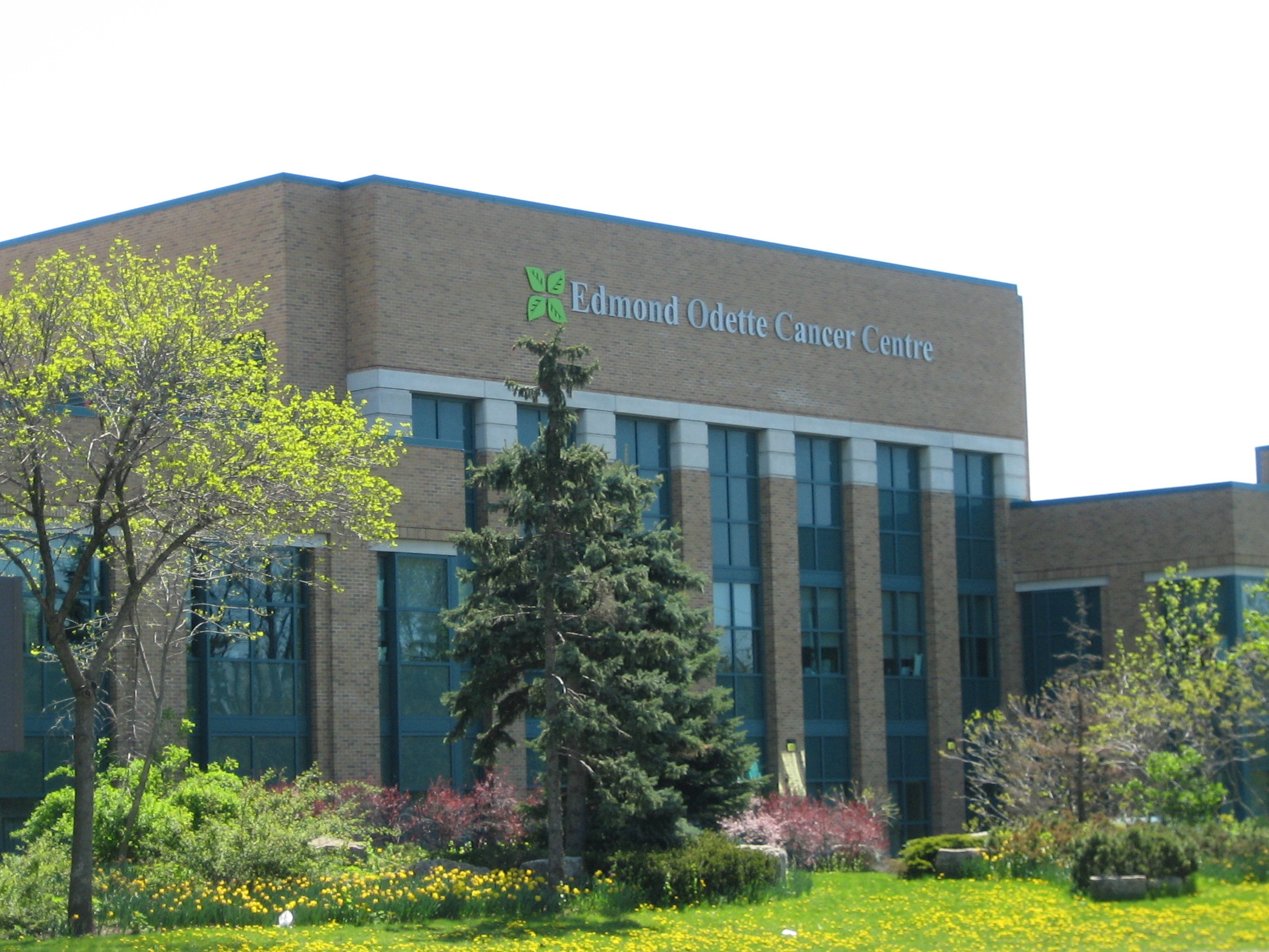
Sunnybrook Health Sciences Centre was opened as Sunnybrook Military Hospital in 1948.

In July 1948, Sunnybrook Military Hospital was opened to the south of the neighbourhood. The hospital was since reorganized into Sunnybrook Health Sciences Centre, and has expanded to encompass much of Bridle Path's southern boundary.

In the 1950s and 1960s, local architects such as James A. Murray, Jerome Markson, Brook and Banz, and Seligman & Dick built a lot of modern houses in the Bridle Path. Many of these have now been replaced with larger houses.

The Bridle Path has been home to prominent Toronto business people, celebrities, doctors, and engineers. Media mogul Moses Znaimer used to call the Bridle Path home, as did Gordon Lightfoot and computer businessman Robert Herjavec. Former newspaper baron and convicted felon, businessman Conrad Black was owner of a familial residence until 2016 when he sold the 26 Park Lane Circle, North York for $16.5 million. Prince bought a house in the Bridle Path in the early 2000s. "Casino King of Macau" Stanley Ho bought a house in the Bridle Path in 1987 for a then-high $5.5 million. Rapper Drake had a house built there for him in the late 2010s, after an older building had been demolished.

A location in the Bridle Path was used in the movie Mean Girls as Regina George's house and another house was used for the movie It Takes Two.

== Education ==
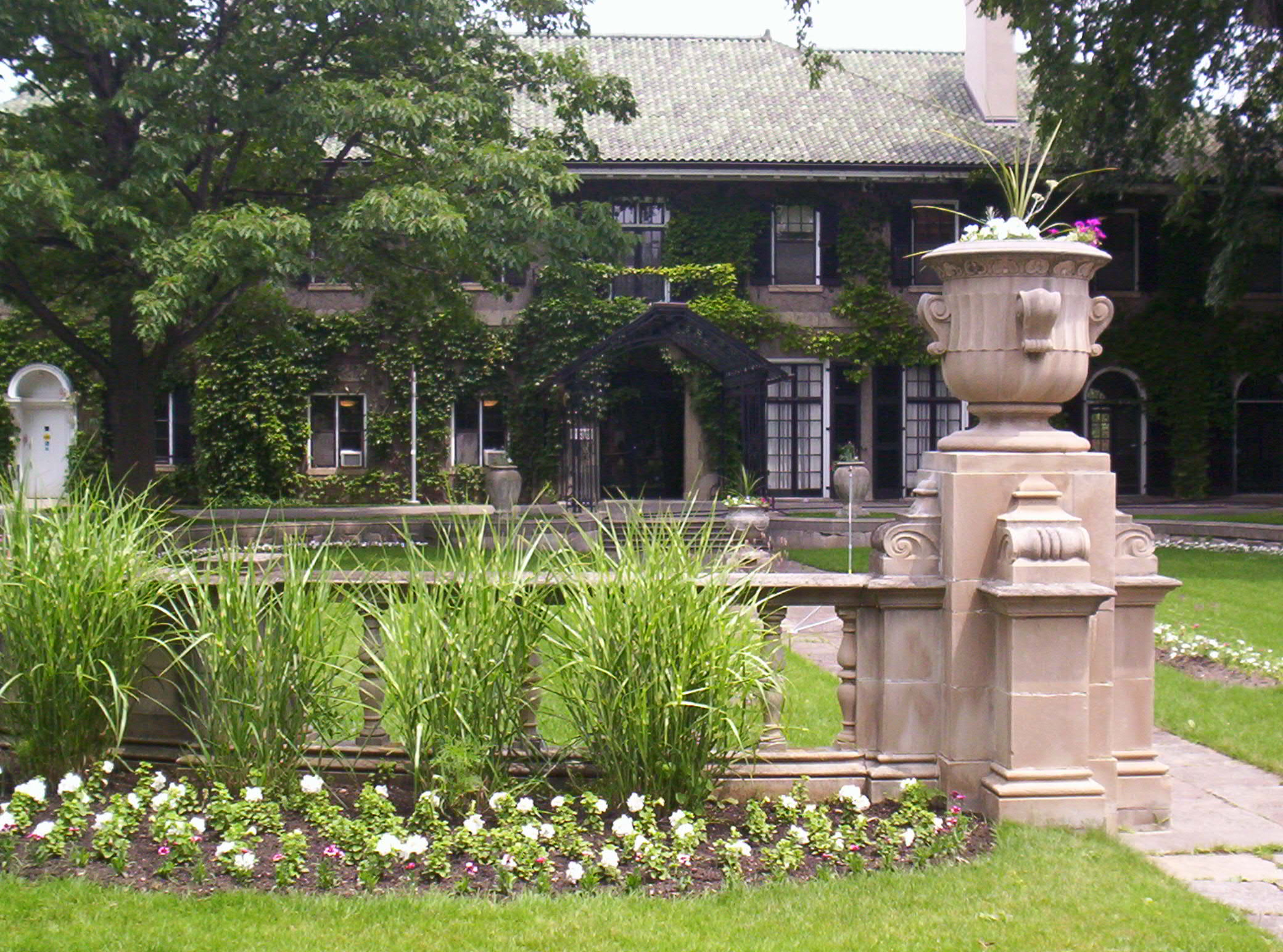
Glendon Manor at Glendon College, a public post-secondary institution located in Bridle Path.

Two public school boards operate elementary schools in Bridle Path, the separate Toronto Catholic District School Board (TCDSB), and the secular Toronto District School Board (TDSB). TCDSB operates St. Bonaventure Catholic School, and TDSB operates Park Lane Public School. Neither school board operates a secondary school in the neighbourhood; secondary schools for both TCDSB and TDSB are in adjacent neighbourhoods.

Two French first language public school boards also provides schooling for applicable residents of Bridle Path, the secular Conseil scolaire Viamonde (CSV), and the separate Conseil scolaire catholique MonAvenir (CSCM). Neither operates a school in the neighbourhood, with CSV and CSCM students attending schools in other neighbourhoods in Toronto.

The neighbourhood has one public post-secondary institution, Glendon College. The college is a federated campus of York University, operating as a bilingual liberal arts college.

In addition to public institutions, the neighbourhood is also home to several private schools, including Crescent School, an elementary and secondary private school, and the Toronto French School (TFS).

== Recreation ==
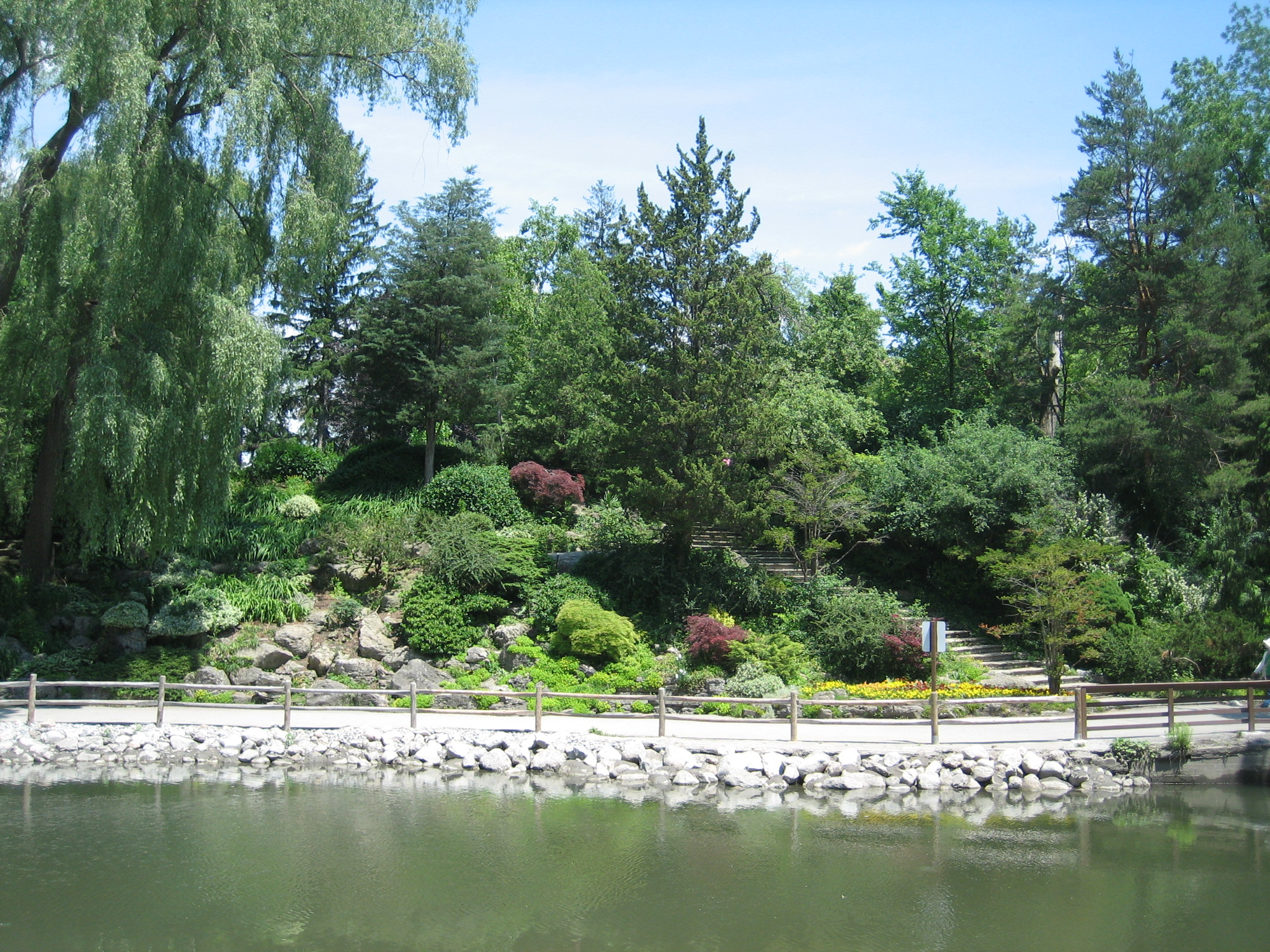
Edwards Gardens is a botanical garden located in Bridle Path.

The neighbourhood includes several municipal parks and green spaces, including Edwards Gardens, Sunnybrook Park, and Windfields Park. Edwards Gardens is a botanical garden located in the east of the neighbourhood. Many of these parks are situated near the Don Valley, which forms a part of the larger Toronto ravine system. Municipal parks in Bridle Path are managed by the Toronto Parks, Forestry and Recreation Division.

== Transportation ==
Several major roadways pass through the neighbourhood, including Bayview Avenue, a north–south thoroughfare, and Lawrence Avenue, an east–west thoroughfare. The neighbourhood's namesake comes from a residential road, The Bridle Path. The actual "Bridle Path" name came about as early plans for the neighbourhood included an elaborate system of equestrian bridle paths, as most of the estate owners in the area preceding its development were horse-owners.

Public transit is provided by Toronto Transit Commission (TTC), operating bus routes around the neighbourhood.

== In popular culture ==
Pop musician Drake name-checked the area in “7am On Bridle Path” on his 2021 studio album Certified Lover Boy, and as part of the Drake–Kendrick Lamar feud Drake's house in the area is shown on the artwork for Kendrick Lamar's single “Not Like Us" with 13 red markers placed on its roof, symbolizing the presence of registered sex offenders.
