= Leaside station =

Toronto subway station

Leaside
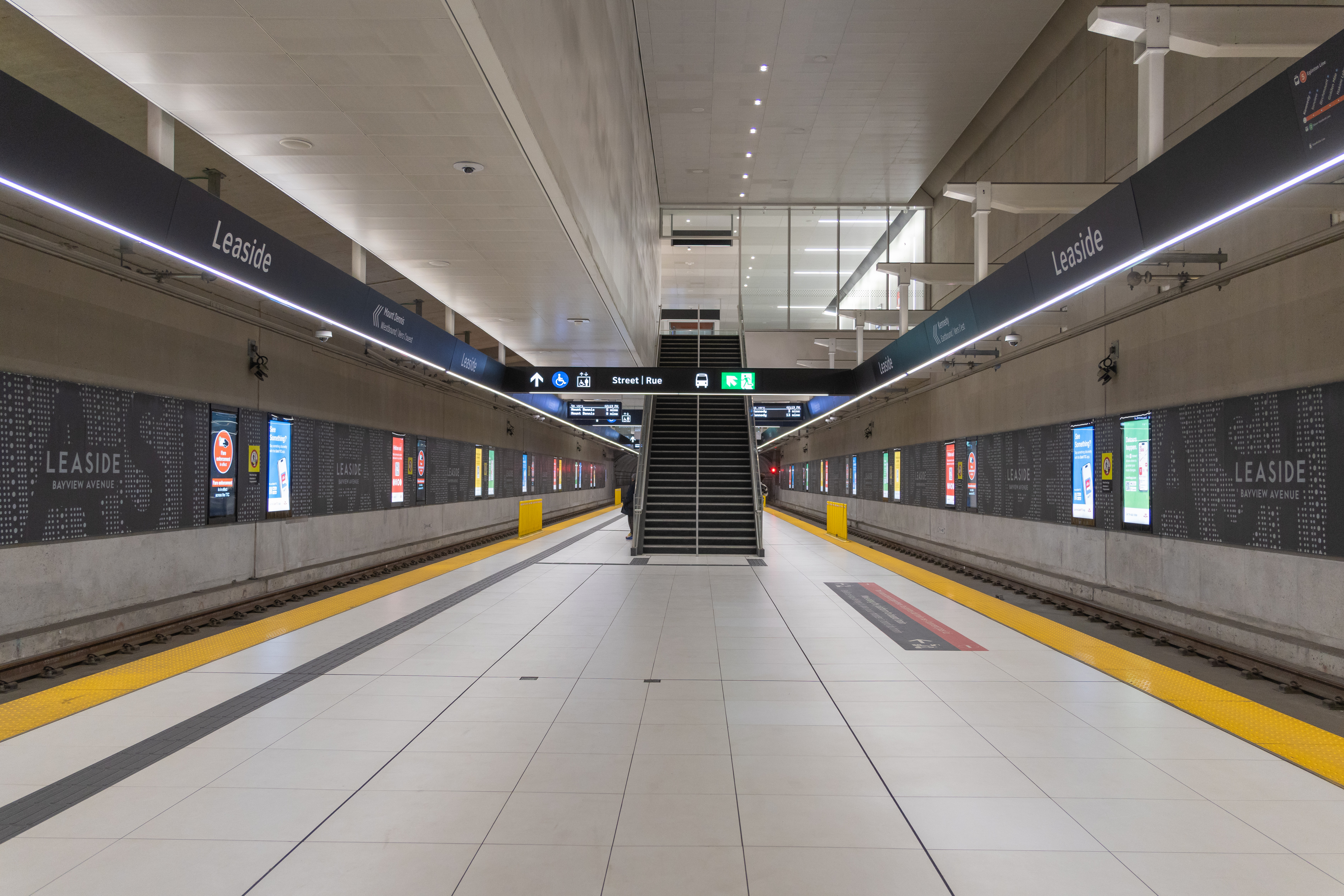

General information
- Location: 615 Eglinton Avenue East; Toronto, Ontario; Canada
- Coordinates: 43°42′40″N 79°22′37″W
- Owner: Metrolinx
- Platforms: Centre platform
- Tracks: 2
- Connections: TTC buses: 11 Bayview; 34 Eglinton; 334 Eglinton

Construction
- Structure type: Underground
- Accessible: Yes
- Architect: Arcadis

History
- Opened: February 8, 2026; 9 months ago

Services
Preceding station	Toronto Transit Commission	Following station
Mount Pleasant towards Mount Dennis	Line 5 Eglinton	Laird towards Kennedy
Location

Leaside is an underground Toronto subway station on Line 5 Eglinton in Toronto, Ontario, Canada. It is located in the Leaside neighbourhood at the intersection of Bayview Avenue and Eglinton Avenue.

== Description ==
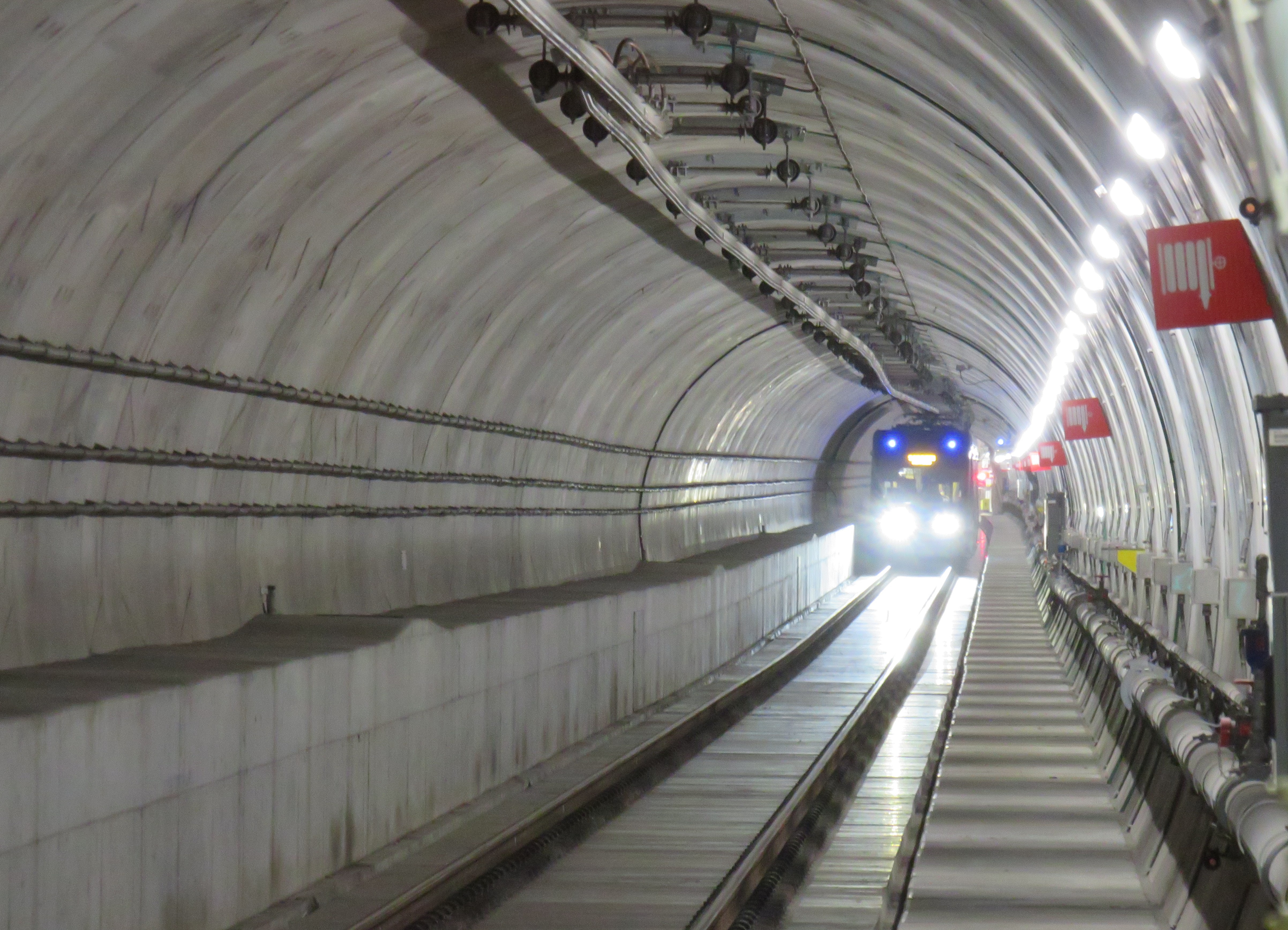
Eastbound train in the tunnel approaching the station

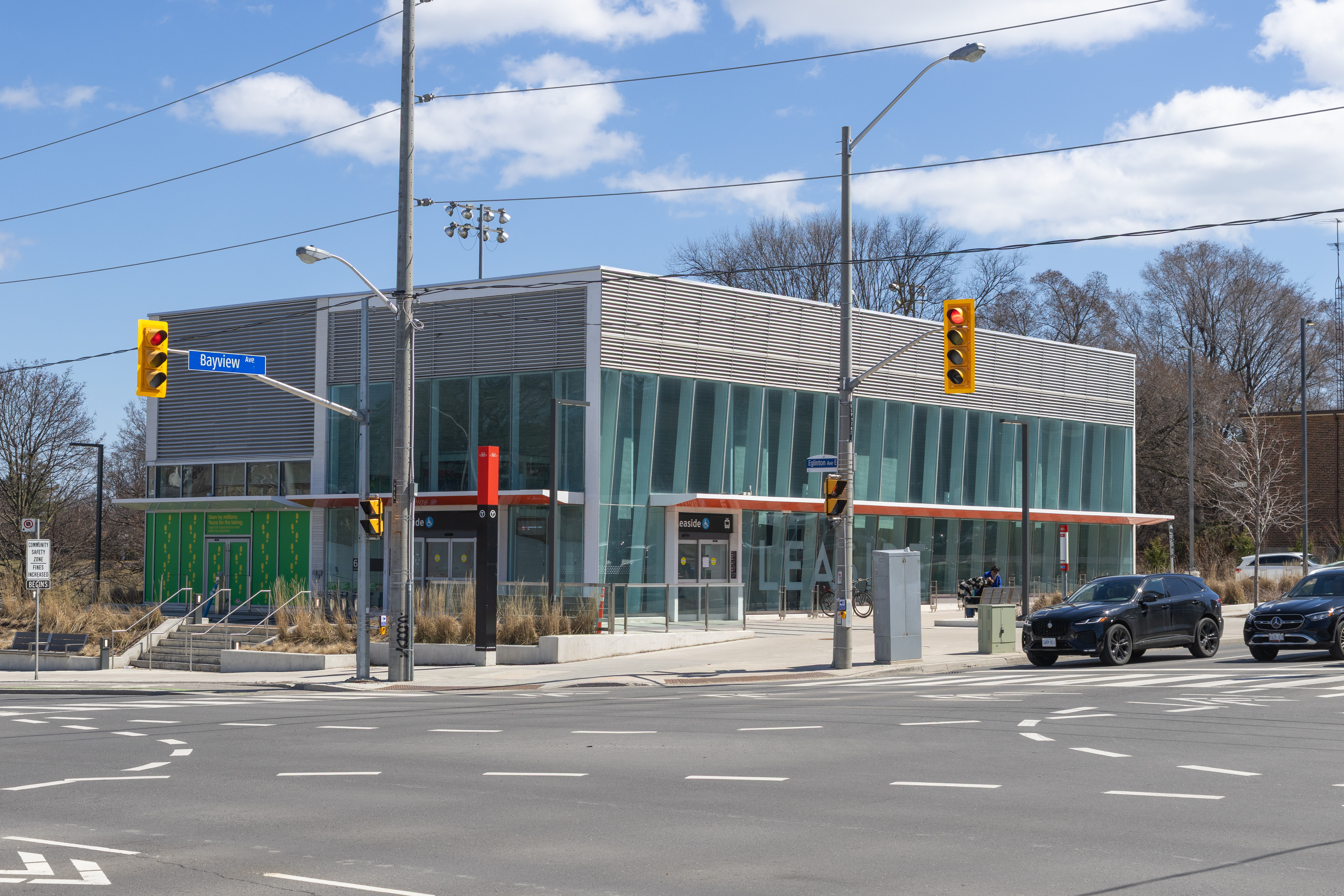
Station main entrance

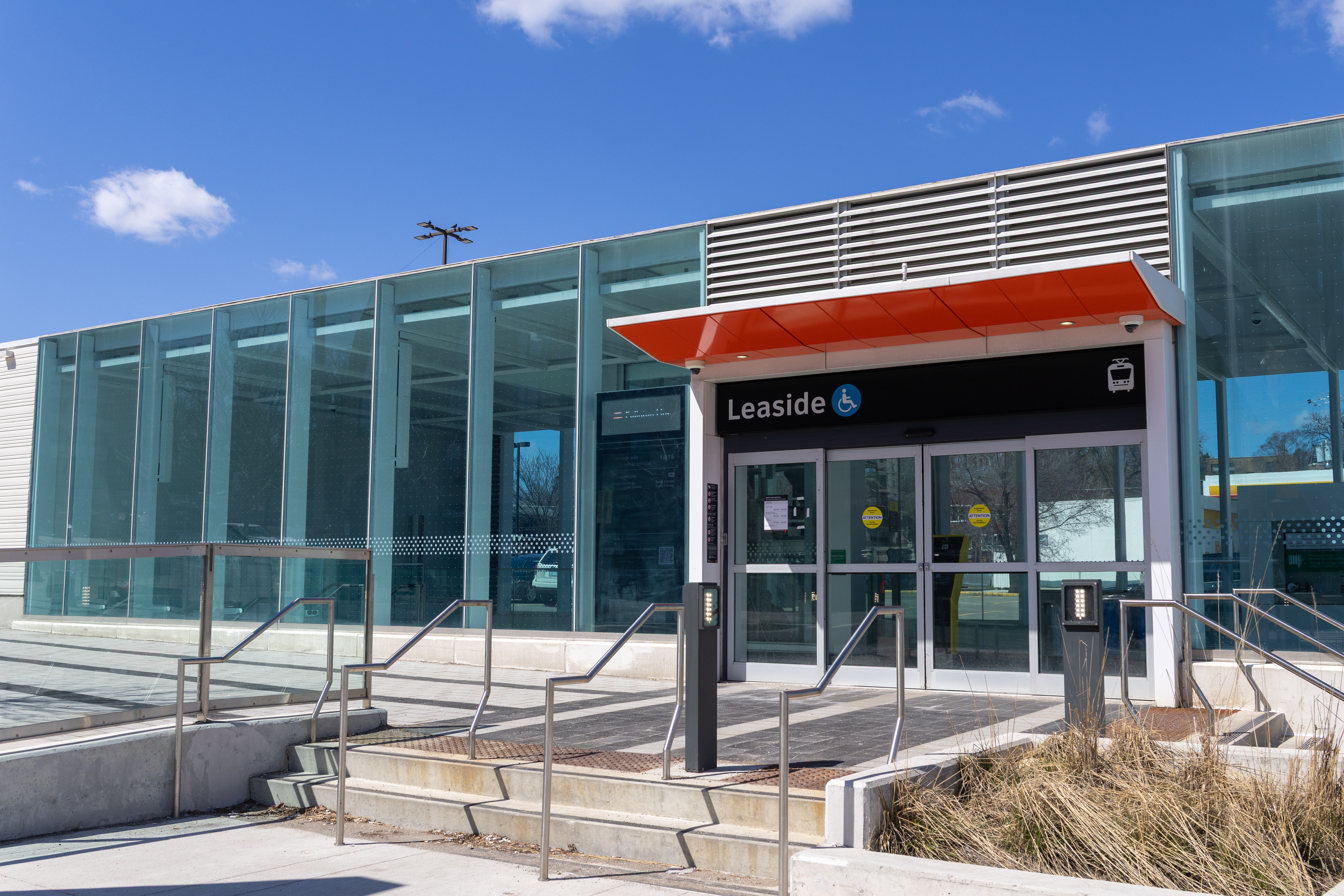
Station secondary entrance

Located at the intersection with Bayview Avenue, this underground station has two entrances on opposite corners: the main entrance at the southeast and a secondary entrance on the northwest (in the corner of a retail parking lot). Nearby destinations include Howard Talbot Park, Leaside High School, Mount Hope Catholic Cemetery, and the Sunnybrook Health Sciences Centre complex.

=== Architecture ===
The station was designed by Arcadis, following an architectural concept designed by architects gh3* from Toronto and Daoust Lestage Lizotte Stecker from Montreal. As with other stations on Line 5, architectural features include natural light from large windows and skylights, steel structures painted white, and orange accents (the colour of the line).

==== Station name ====
During the planning stages for Line 5 Eglinton, the station was given the working name Bayview, which is identical to the pre-existing Bayview station on Line 4 Sheppard. In 2015, a report to the TTC Board recommended giving a unique name to each station in the subway system (including Line 5 Eglinton). Thus, the LRT station was renamed Leaside.

== Station site ==
In October 2013, local residents learned that Metrolinx negotiations with Countrywide Homes, the current owner, allowed the owner to propose to build a new condominium over the station. Metrolinx was to acquire several adjacent properties, not necessary for constructing the station, because they fit within the plan to put the property to dual use. A Countrywide Homes executive characterized the dual-use plan "a unique opportunity because it will potentially be one of the only stops where you'll have residential right above a subway stop". Councillor Jon Burnside voiced concern that the developer would use the association with new line to argue for an exemption to the current height restrictions for the area of nine storeys and instead build a high-rise.

On September 24, 2015, a McDonald's restaurant on the southeast corner of Bayview and Eglinton Avenues was closed to make way for the station. Its closure had been a contentious topic at town hall meetings, reflecting widespread concerns about the local impact of the new transit system. The McDonald's had been a neighbourhood landmark due to its unique design, with the dining area elevated above a ground-level parking lot, and its proximity to Howard Talbot Park, which patrons could view while eating.

== Surface connections ==
The following routes serve Leaside station:

Route	Name	Additional information
11	Bayview	Northbound to Steeles Avenue via Sunnybrook Hospital and southbound to Davisville station
34	Eglinton	Westbound to Mount Dennis station and eastbound to Kennedy station
334A	Eglinton	Blue Night service; eastbound to Kennedy station and westbound to Renforth Drive and Pearson Airport
334B	Eglinton	Blue Night service; eastbound to Finch Avenue East and Neilson Road via Morningside Avenue and westbound to Mount Dennis station
