= St. Joseph's Morrow Park Catholic Secondary School =

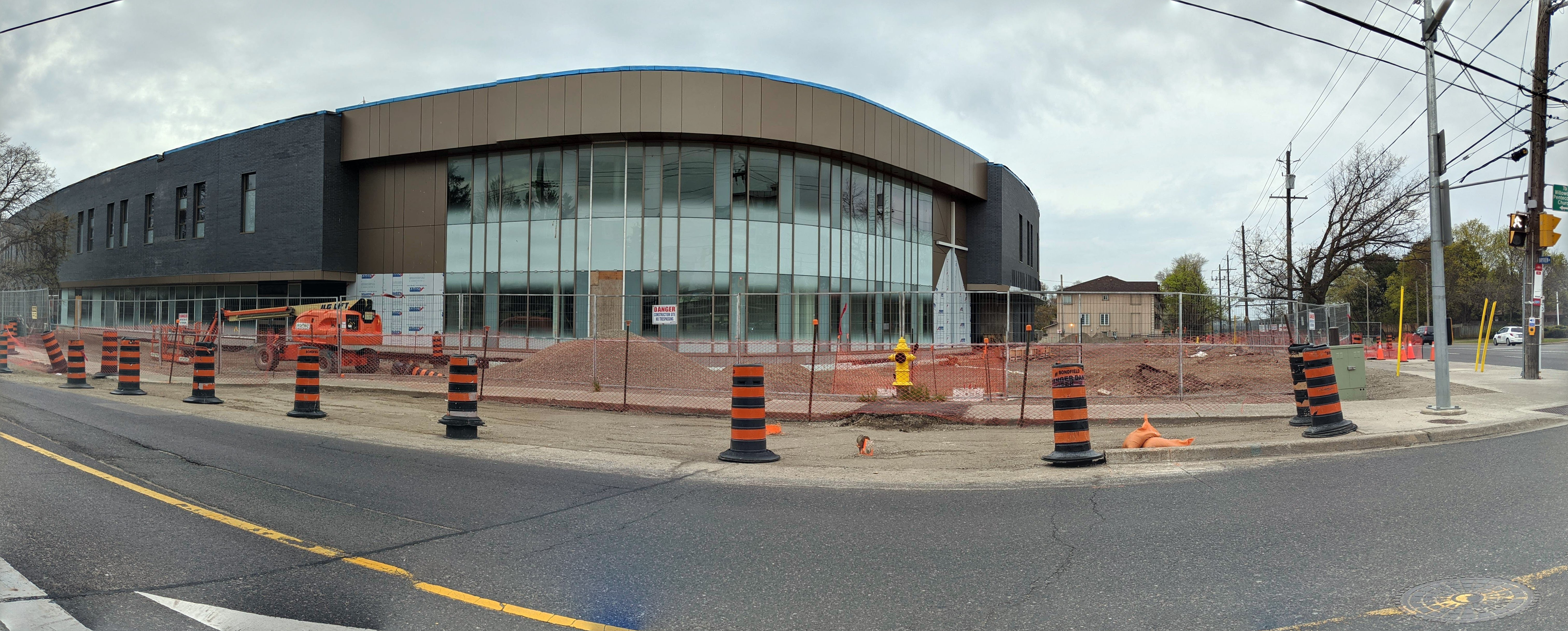
- The school under construction in May 2020

Location
- 3338 Bayview Avenue; Toronto, Ontario, M2M 3R9; Canada; 43.7926°N 79.3946°W

Information
- School type: Catholic high school
- Motto: Congregavit nos in unum Christi amor (The love of Christ has gathered us together into one)
- Religious affiliations: Roman Catholic (Sisters of St. Joseph)
- Founded: 1960
- School board: Toronto Catholic District School Board (Metropolitan Separate School Board)
- Superintendent: Cristina Fernandes; Area 4
- Area trustee: Angela Kennedy; Ward 11
- School number: 516 / 815160
- Principal: Rita Leone
- Grades: 9-12
- Enrolment: 477 (2017-18)
- Language: English
- Campus: Willowdale
- Area: Bayview Woods-Steeles, North York
- Colours: Green, white and black
- Mascot: Jade the Jaguar
- Team name: Morrow Park Jaguars
- Newspaper: The Pawprint
- Parish: Blessed Trinity
- Program Focus: Extended French; Gifted
- Website: stjosephmorrowpark.tcdsb.org

St. Joseph's Morrow Park Catholic Secondary School (locally known as St. Joseph's Morrow Park, SJMPCSS, SJMP, or sporadically Morrow Park) is a publicly funded all-girls secondary school located in Toronto, Ontario. It was founded by the Sisters of St. Joseph in 1960 and is attached to the Sisters' motherhouse at Morrow Park. The Sisterhood was founded on October 15, 1650 in Le Puy-en-Velay, France, by Jean-Pierre Medaille, a French Jesuit.

The school is part of the Toronto Catholic District School Board, formerly the Metropolitan Separate School Board since 1987. It is a semestered school and presently has an enrolment of 1,076 students. The school has a range of programs that include resource assistance, English as a second language (ESL), and gifted programs such as the Queen's Enrichment Program, Catholic Schools United Nations Assembly, and Advanced Placement (AP).

St. Joseph's Morrow Park is the sister school of Brebeuf College School.

== History ==
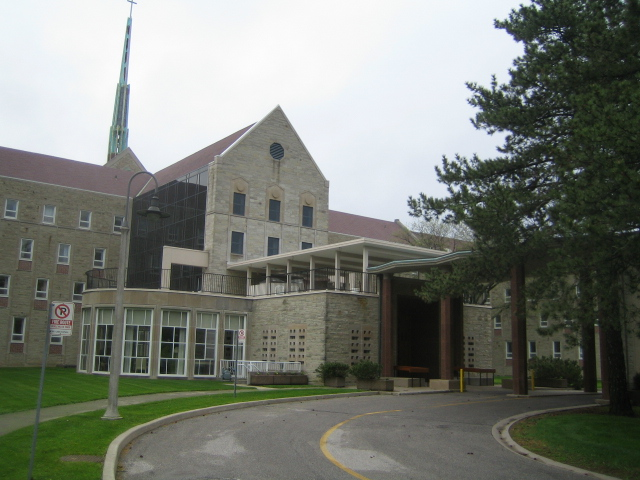
St. Joseph's Morrow Park Catholic Secondary School original campus from 1960 to 2021

St. Joseph's Morrow Park Catholic Secondary School is a school for girls. It is attached to the Motherhouse of the Sisters of St. Joseph's of Toronto. In the year 1648, Jean-Pierre Medaille founded the congregation in LePuy, France. The community was active in giving support to the orphans, caring for the sick, and educating the younger students. In 1851, the Sisters of St. Joseph came to Toronto. St. Joseph's Morrow Park came about as a result of the relocation and expansion of St. Joseph's which was then operating at Bay and Wellesley. The new Motherhouse was built on Willowdale on a property given to the congregation. A day school and boarding school were part of this complex. In September 1960, St. Joseph's Morrow Park opened its doors with 147 students.

The 9th and 10th grades were placed under the sanction of the Metropolitan Separate School Board (now the Toronto Catholic District School Board) in 1967 while the tuition fees continued to be used for grades 11–13. In 1984, when the Province of Ontario decided that Catholic secondary schools were to be fully funded, Morrow Park was expanded into high school grades up to grade 13. By 1987, the operations and maintenance of SJMP were passed on to the MSSB.

=== Relocation and controversy ===
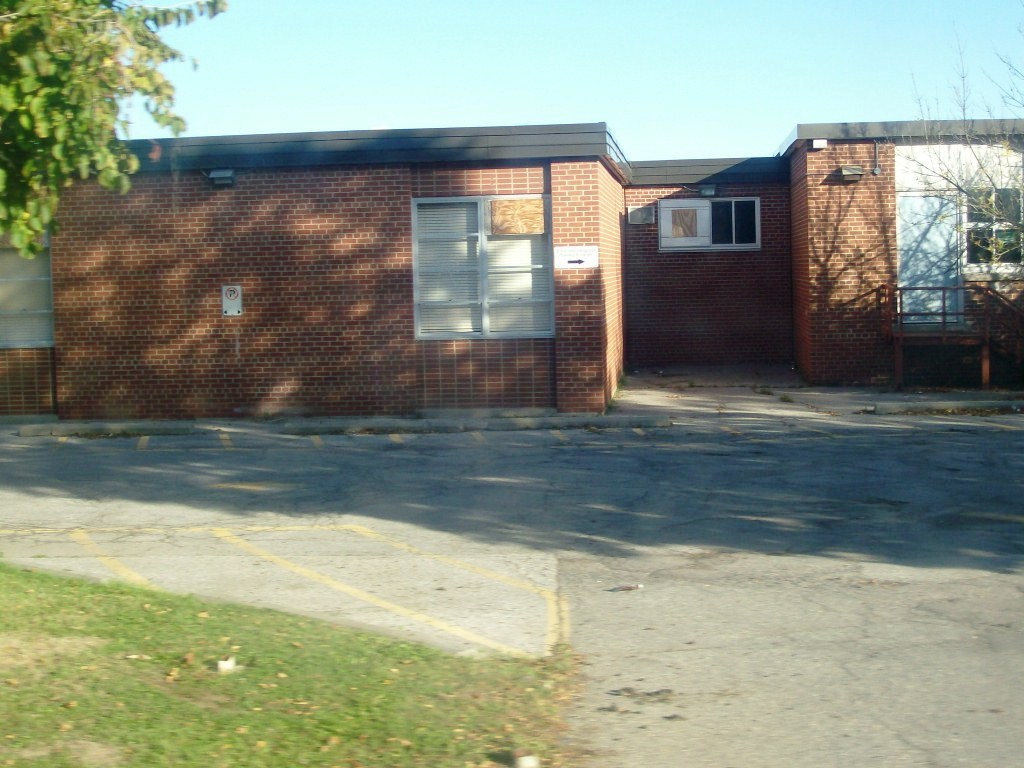
The former Lester B. Pearson P.S., in 2013

In 2006, the Sisters of St. Joseph announced that Morrow Park, the school property, along with the school had been sold to Tyndale University College and Seminary. The TCDSB has chosen a site for the school.

It would have been relocated at Bayview and Finch on the current site of Blessed Trinity Catholic Elementary School (and elementary school were to relocate temporarily to the former St. Leonard Catholic School near Leslie Avenue and Finch Avenue East). The new school would accommodate 800 students in grades JK-12. The elementary school would be co-ed, but the high school would remain an all-girls school to coincide with the original intent of the creation of St. Joseph's Morrow Park in 1960. Those changes were rendered moot as the board decided to extend of the lease of St. Joseph's Morrow Park Catholic Secondary School at Tyndale until December 31, 2020. With the changes, the TCDSB has also received permission from the Ministry of Education to purchase the site at 500 Cummer Avenue on the former Cummer Avenue Public School / Cummer LINC (since closed in 2011) to accommodate construction of the new St. Joseph Morrow Park Catholic Secondary School.

On August 27, 2015, the TCDSB trustees voted 6–4 to expropriate 17 townhomes on the southern end.

Construction of the newly built $24.75 million secondary school started in May 2018. The new facility construction was originally set to be completed in September 2020, but it was pushed to January 2021 due to the COVID-19 pandemic in Toronto. After months of imminent closures and high vaccine rates, the school fully opened in September 2021 in time for the new 2021-22 academic year.

== Alumnae ==
- Marie Henein, lawyer
- Sandrine Holt, actress
- Karen Stintz, chair of the Toronto Transit Commission, 2010–2014

== See also ==
- Education in Ontario
- List of secondary schools in Ontario
