= Crescent School (Toronto) =

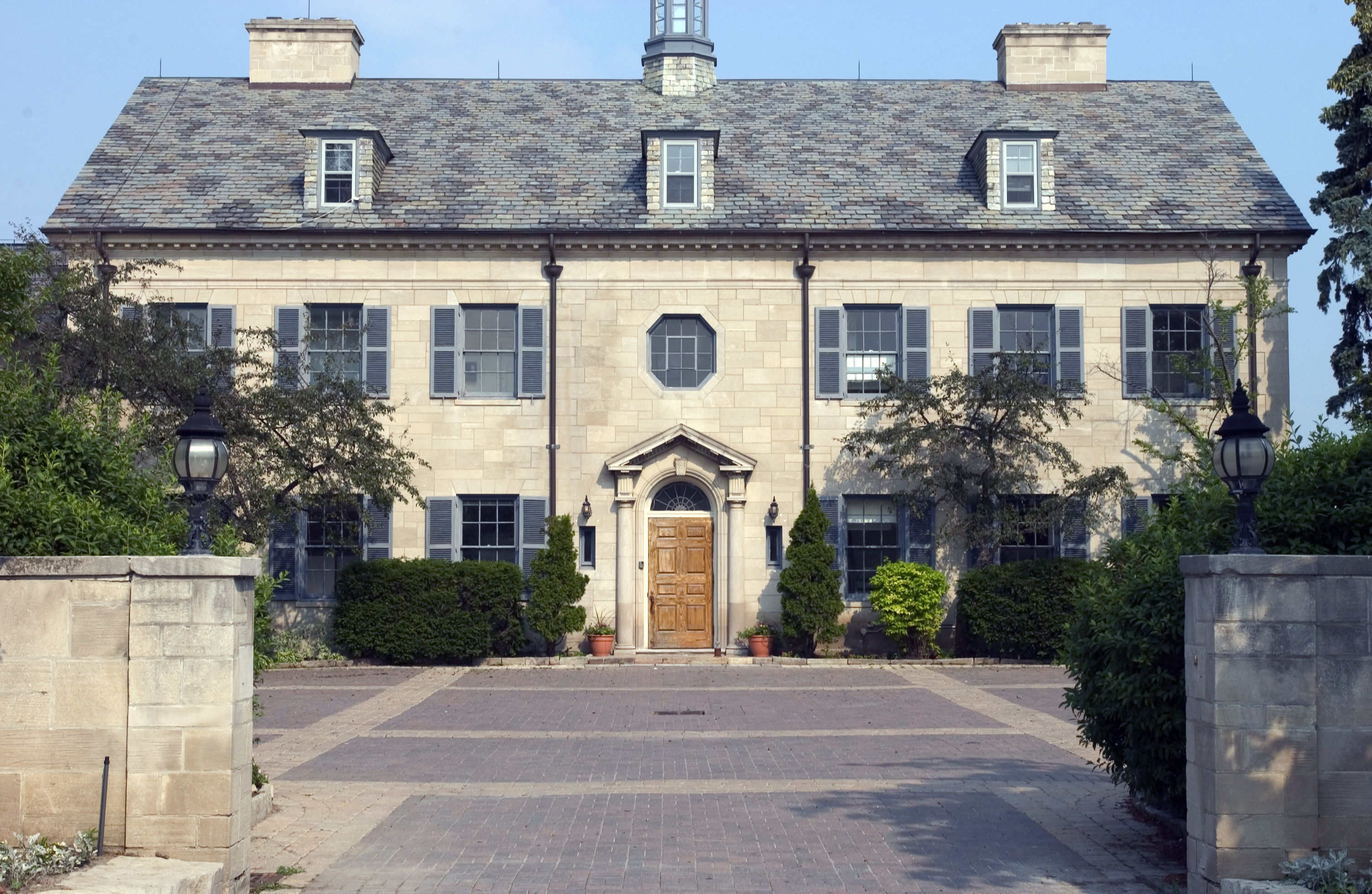

Location
- 2365 Bayview Avenue; Toronto, Ontario, M2L 1A2; Canada; 43.732499°N 79.379218°W

Information
- School type: Independent day school
- Motto: Veritate Stamus Et Crescimus
- Established: 1913
- Headmaster: Michael Fellin
- Campus: 30 acres
- Endowment: $12.5 million
- Website: www.crescentschool.org

Crescent School is an independent elementary and secondary boys' school in Toronto, Ontario, Canada. It teaches boys from Grades 1 to 12. Established in 1913 by John William James, the school moved to their current campus at 2365 Bayview Avenue in 1970. In 2021, Crescent acquired the Bob Rumball Centre property at 2395 Bayview Avenue.

== History ==
Crescent School was founded in September 1913 by its first headmaster, John William James. He opened his school to a group of boys at his home at 43 Rosedale Road.

In 1933, Susan Massey (née Denton), the aunt of Vincent Massey (who served as Governor General of Canada in the 1950s), donated her mansion and 40 acres of land to the school, making its expansion possible. The mansion and land were located on part of the Massey family's farm in East York, near Victoria Park Avenue and Dawes Road. The school operated there until 1969, when the property was sold to developers, who subsequently built the Crescent Town neighbourhood on that site. By 1970, the school had moved to its current location on Bayview Avenue, which was formerly the estate of businessman Frank Porter Wood, built in 1930.

Crescent operates a house system, in which all students are assigned membership in one of six houses. These houses are named after the Canadian explorers Cartier, Hudson, Mackenzie, Massey, Simcoe and Wolfe. The six houses compete in athletic and academic intramural activities throughout each year.

== Teacher Awards ==
In 2014, Sylvia Duckworth, a teacher at Crescent School, was awarded a National Certificate of Excellence in Prime Minister's Awards for Teaching Excellence.

In 2015, David Grant, a teacher at Crescent School, was awarded a Certificate of Achievement in the Prime Minister's Awards for Teaching Excellence.

In 2017, Michael Jansen, a teacher at Crescent School, was awarded the Chemical Institute of Canada's Beaumier Award for High School/CÉGEP Chemistry Teachers. In 2018, Michael Jansen was presented with a Certificate of Achievement in the Prime Minister's Awards for Teaching Excellence.

In 2020, Natalie Vera was awarded the Prime Minister's Award of Excellence STEM Certificate of Achievement.

== Facilities ==
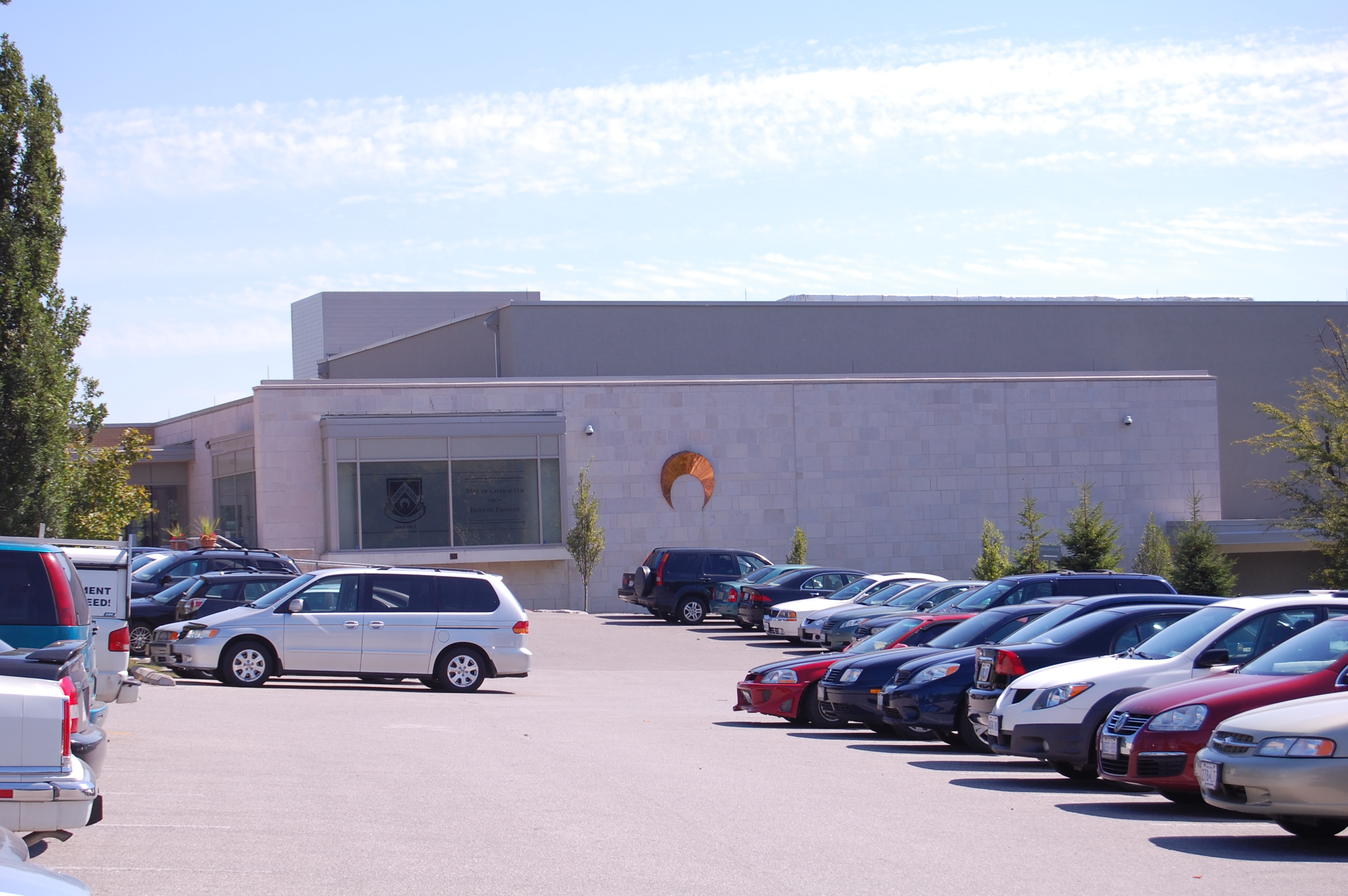
Centre for Creative Learning, 2007

Field House – In 2002, Crescent opened the "Field House", a 30,000-square-foot space (the size of three average gymnasiums) used for tennis, basketball, indoor track and ball hockey. This replaced the three outdoor tennis courts that had been situated there before.

Centre for Creative Learning – In 2004, the Centre for Creative Learning opened, featuring a professionally equipped, 350-seat theatre, meeting rooms and a reception area.

Innes Field – In 2008, an artificial turf surface, called Innes Field, opened. It replaced the previous grass playing fields.

Lau Family Wing – In 2011, Crescent opened the Lau Family Wing, an addition adjacent to the existing Centre for Creative Learning (CCL). The building was named in honour of Ming Wai Lau (Class of 1997), and the Joseph Lau Luen Hung Family Charitable Trust, the main benefactors. Most Middle School classes, as well as some Upper School classes, are held in the Lau Family Wing.

Latifi Family Commons – In September 2014, the Latifi Family Commons, a $3 million (CAD) facility housing Crescent programs including University Counselling and Crescent Student Services, was opened. It is named for Michael and Marilena Latifi, who are parents of Crescent School students.

Libraries – The Margaret Donnelly Library, which opened in 2012, is used by boys in Grades 3 to 6. The Middle School/Upper School Library, which opened in 2014, is designed for older boys.

== Athletics ==
Senior Rugby Team, October 2005

Crescent teams include basketball, hockey, baseball, track and field, rugby, volleyball, badminton, tennis, swimming, soccer, cross country running, squash, golf and Ultimate Frisbee.

In the 1920s and 1930s, the Crescent School held athletic events with other private and independent schools in the Greater Toronto Area. These events were often reported on in the Globe & Mail newspaper; the soccer match between the Crescent School and Appleby College held on November 30, 1937, ended in a tie. During this interwar era, the School held an annual boxing tournament with, "...Parents, Old Boys and friends of the School..." invited to attend. In addition to boxing, soccer, and cricket, the School also held an "annual aquatic gala" where prizes were given to the best boys.

== Notable alumni ==
- George Hees (1922), Member of Canadian Parliament
- Neil Lumsden (1971), football player
- Spencer Rice (1975), television personality
- Christophe Beck (1987), Emmy Award-winning composer
- Evan Solomon (1987), Member of Canadian Parliament and television personality
- David Harlock (1989), NHL and Olympic hockey player
- Rob Coleman (1983), animation director
- Kevin Abrams, (1989), Assistant General Manager of Super Bowl Champion New York Giants football team
- Chilly Gonzales (1989), Grammy-nominated Canadian musician
- Gabriel Leung (1990), physician and epidemiologist
- Rob Stewart, filmmaker and photographer
- Ted Livingston (2005), founder of Kik Messenger
- Sam Greenwood, poker player
- Nicholas Latifi (2013), Formula One driver for Williams Racing
- Xaivian Lee (2021), college basketball player

== See also ==
- Education in Ontario
- List of secondary schools in Ontario
