= Sunnybrook Park =

Municipal park in Toronto

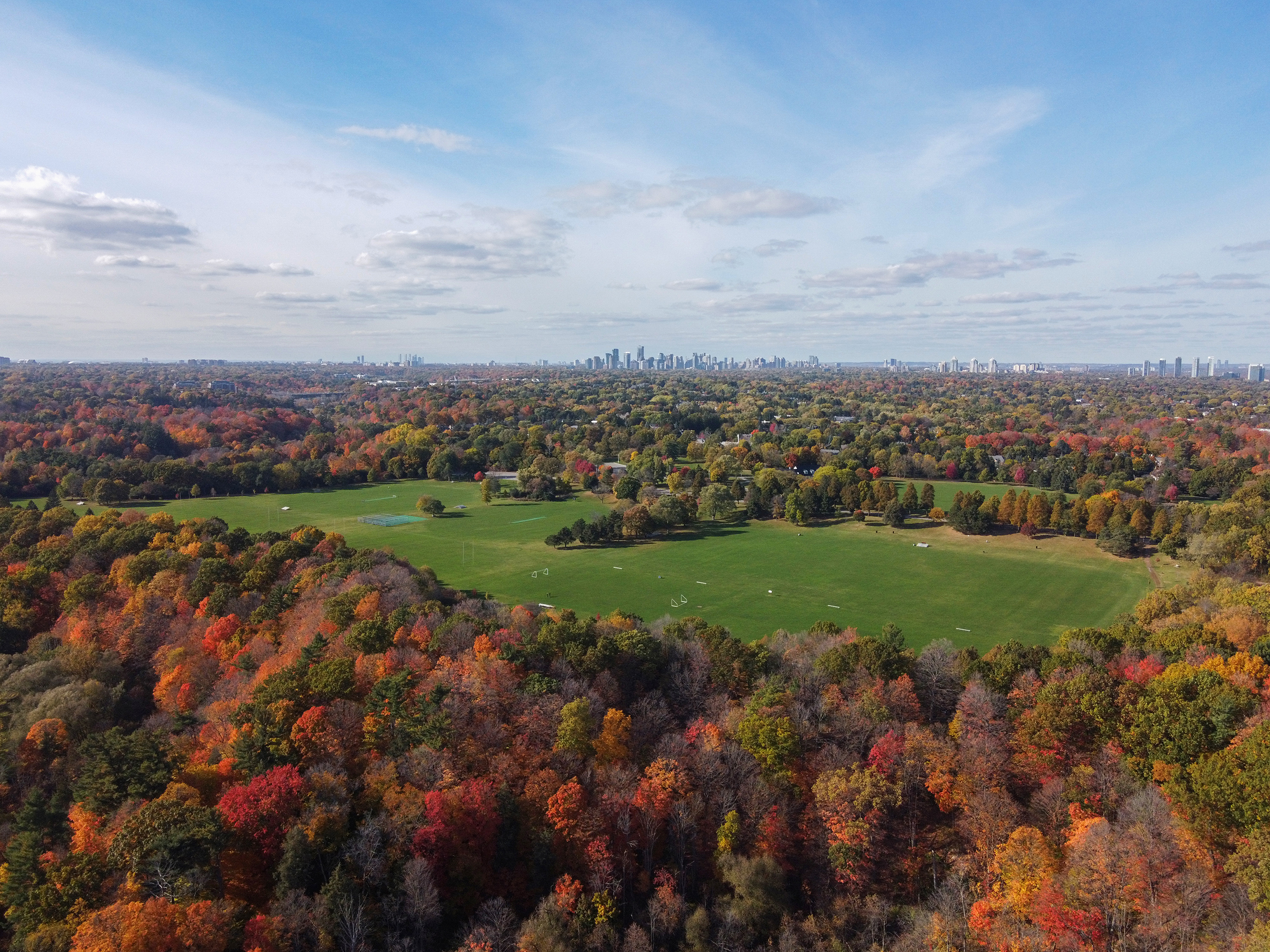
- Sunnybrook Park in the autumn
- Interactive map of Sunnybrook Park
- Type: Public park
- Location: Toronto, Ontario
- Coordinates: 43.723°N 79.359°W
- Area: 147.1 acres (59.5 ha)
- Created: 1928 (City of Toronto); 12 June 1969 (transferred to Metro Parks)
- Operator: City of Toronto

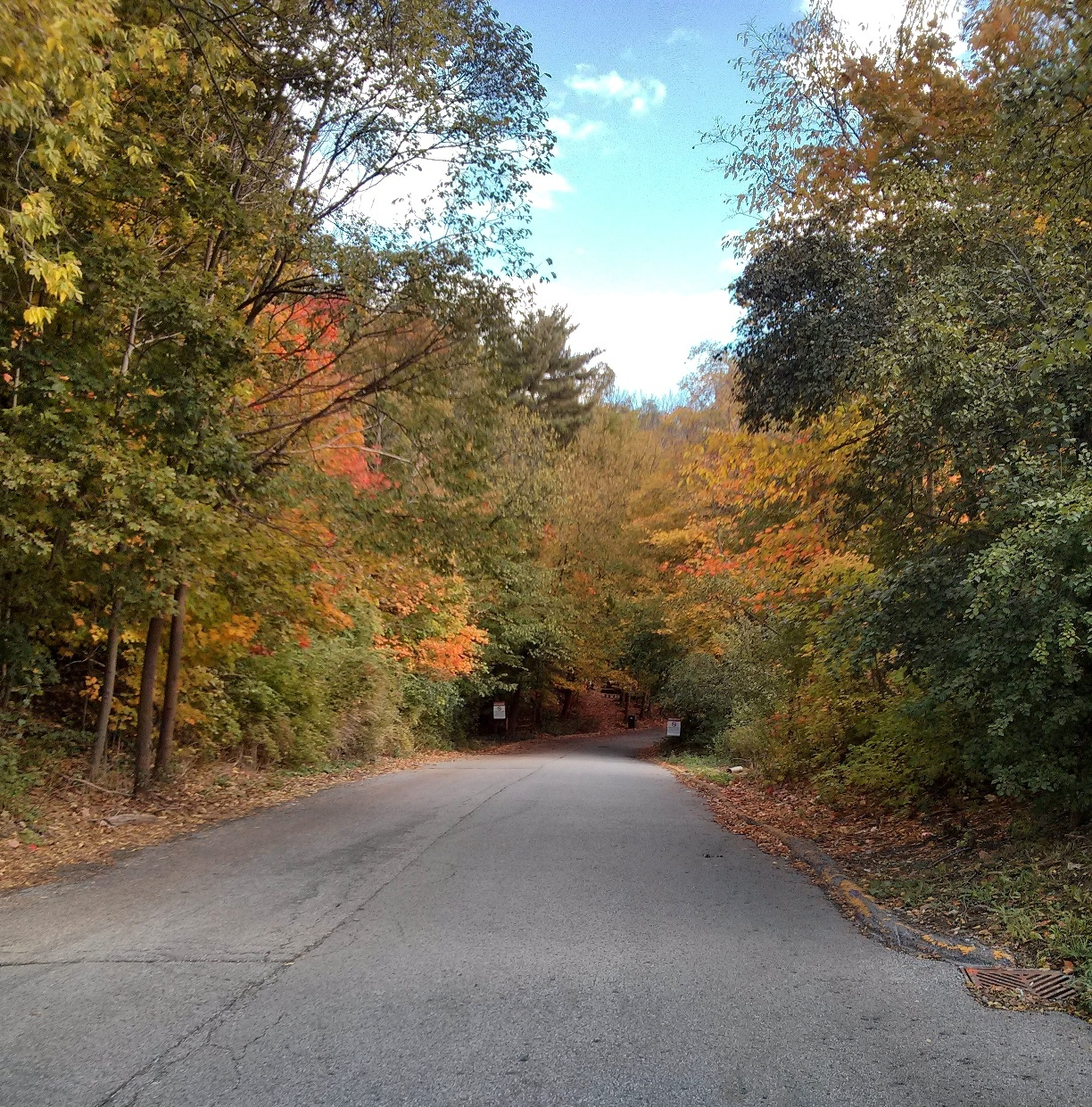
The road from Sunnybrook Health Sciences Centre down into Sunnybrook Park in the fall

Sunnybrook Park is a large public park in Toronto, Ontario, Canada. It is located north of Leaside and south of the Bridle Path areas of the city. The park is home to many bike trails, dog parks, and Sunnybrook Stables.

== History ==
Sunnybrook began as a farm property of about 71 hectares (175 acres), known as Sunnybrook Farm, with horse stables. It lay within the former Town of Leaside and was owned by Joseph and Alice Kilgour before being transferred to the City of Toronto in 1928.

Joseph Kilgour, president of the Canada Paper Company, had acquired the property in the 1890s.

In 1933 Kilgour Memorial Gates at Bayview Avenue and Blythwood Road (since demolished) as well as a plaque at Wilket Creek Park were added to commemorate the Kilgour family's legacy and presence in the area.

== Stables ==
Sunnybrook Stables is a horseback riding facility that has been open to the public since 1978. The stables house roughly thirty horses, accompanied by two arenas: a 12,000 square-foot indoor arena built in 1982 for year-round practice, as well as an outdoor arena that also serves as a paddock. Just behind the indoor arena are three other paddocks, also used for the horses to roam when they're not in their stalls.

=== Fire in 2018 ===
On 21 May 2018, right before 3 am ET, Sunnybrook Stables caught on fire and became engulfed in flames, killing 16 of the 29 horses in the stable. A barn near Sunnybrook Stables also caught on fire. The cause of the fire is unknown, although the Ontario Fire Marshal suspected that the fire was caused by fireworks reported in the area of Sunnybrook Stables both on the night of 20 May and the early morning of 21 May.

== Cricket ==
Sunnybrook hosted a first-class cricket fixture in 2004. The Canada national cricket team used the ground for their ICC Intercontinental Cup match against Bermuda, which ended in a draw with Canada requiring only one further wicket to win.

The ground also hosted six matches during the 2001 ICC Trophy.

== Nearby Transportation ==
As of February 8^{th}, 2026, South Side of Sunnybrook Park have Line 5 Eglinton Sunnybrook Park Station at Eglinton Street East & Leslie Street.
