= Don Mills (disambiguation) =

Don Mills is a Toronto neighbourhood.

Don Mills may also refer to:

== Locations ==
- Don Mills (electoral district), a provincial electoral district, 1963–1999
- Don Mills Collegiate Institute
- Don Mills Middle School
- Don Mills Road
- Don Mills station, a TTC subway station
- Todmorden Mills, formerly known as Don Mills

== People ==
- Don Mills (footballer), English footballer
- Donald Mills, singer
- Donald Mills (footballer) (1909–1945), Australian rules footballer
- Don Harper Mills, president of the American Academy of Forensic Sciences
- Don Mills (basketball), American basketball player
