= Algonquin College - Kuwait =

Private college in Kuwait

Algonquin College Kuwait
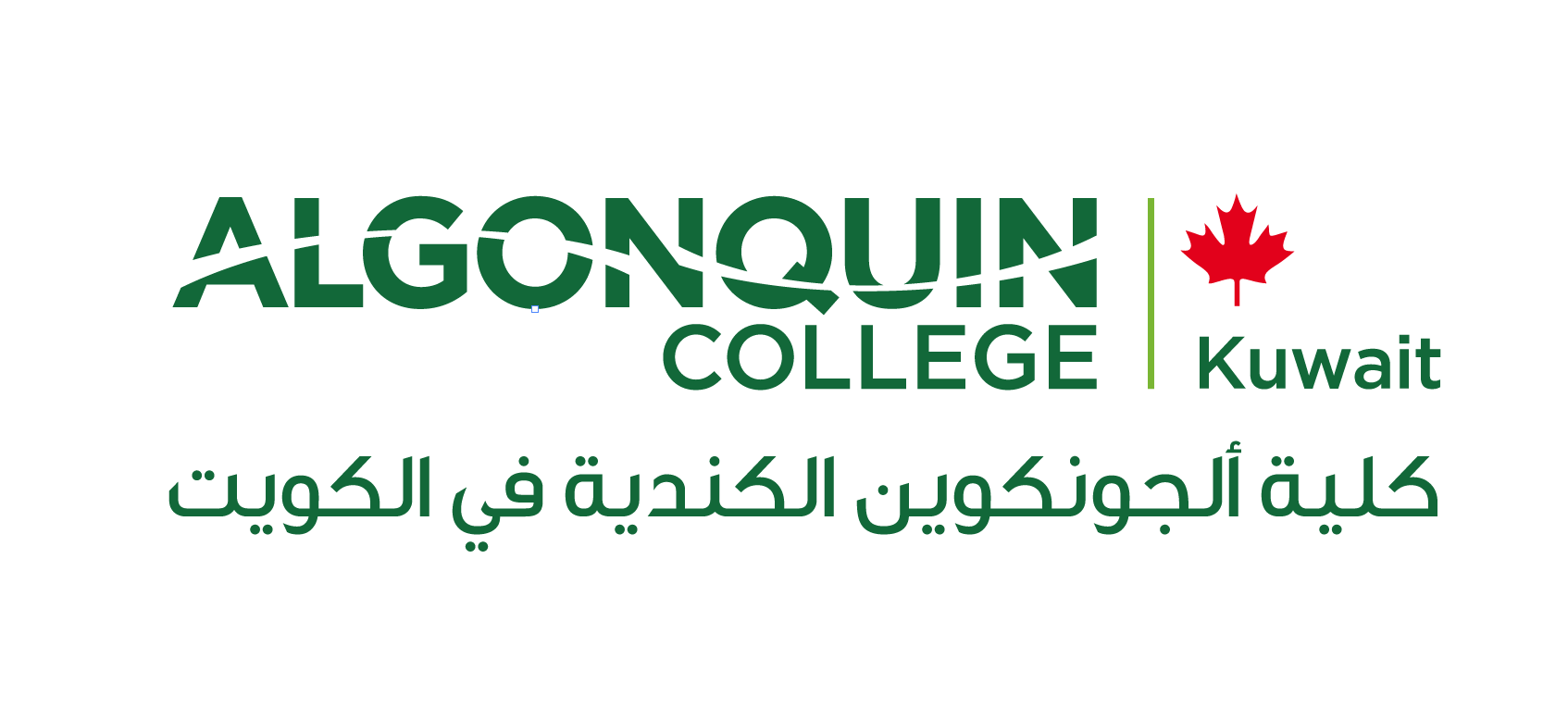
- Type: Private
- Established: 2015
- Chairman: Saud Jafar
- President: David McHardy
- Location: Al-Naseem, Jahra, Kuwait
- Campus: Urban
- Colours: Green and White
- Affiliations: ACCC, AUCC, CBIE, Polytechnics Canada
- Website: www.ac-kuwait.edu.kw

Algonquin College Kuwait is a private post-secondary institution in Kuwait specializing in information technology, business and entrepreneurship. The college was authorized to operate in Kuwait by an Emiri Decree in October 2010. In September 2015, Algonquin College of Kuwait was established as a branch campus of Algonquin College in Ottawa, Canada. The Kuwaiti government allocated land to the college campus in Al-Naseem, Jahra Governorate. The Private Universities Council approved detailed construction plans in 2012. The senior management team was hired in 2014.

== Campus ==
The campus is located in Al-Naseem, west of Kuwait city. It opened in the fall of 2015. It consists of 3 interconnected buildings for administration, services, and academic space. There are external sports facilities and covered parking spaces.

Programs The college offers a 2-year diploma in business and IT programs. Various pathways to a 4-year degree are available to students who meet minimum degree requirements and wish to continue their studies. Students graduating from the 2 year programs are issued 2 diplomas, one from the main campus in Ottawa and one from the Kuwaiti campus.

- School of English and Academic Foundations
  - English and Academic Foundations
- School of Advanced Technology
  - Computer Programmer
  - Internet Applications and Web Development
  - Interactive Media Design
- School of Business
  - Business Management and Entrepreneurship
  - Business Marketing
  - Business Accounting
- Department of Continuing Education and Community Engagement

== See also ==
- Algonquin College
- List of universities in Kuwait
