= Northview Heights Secondary School =

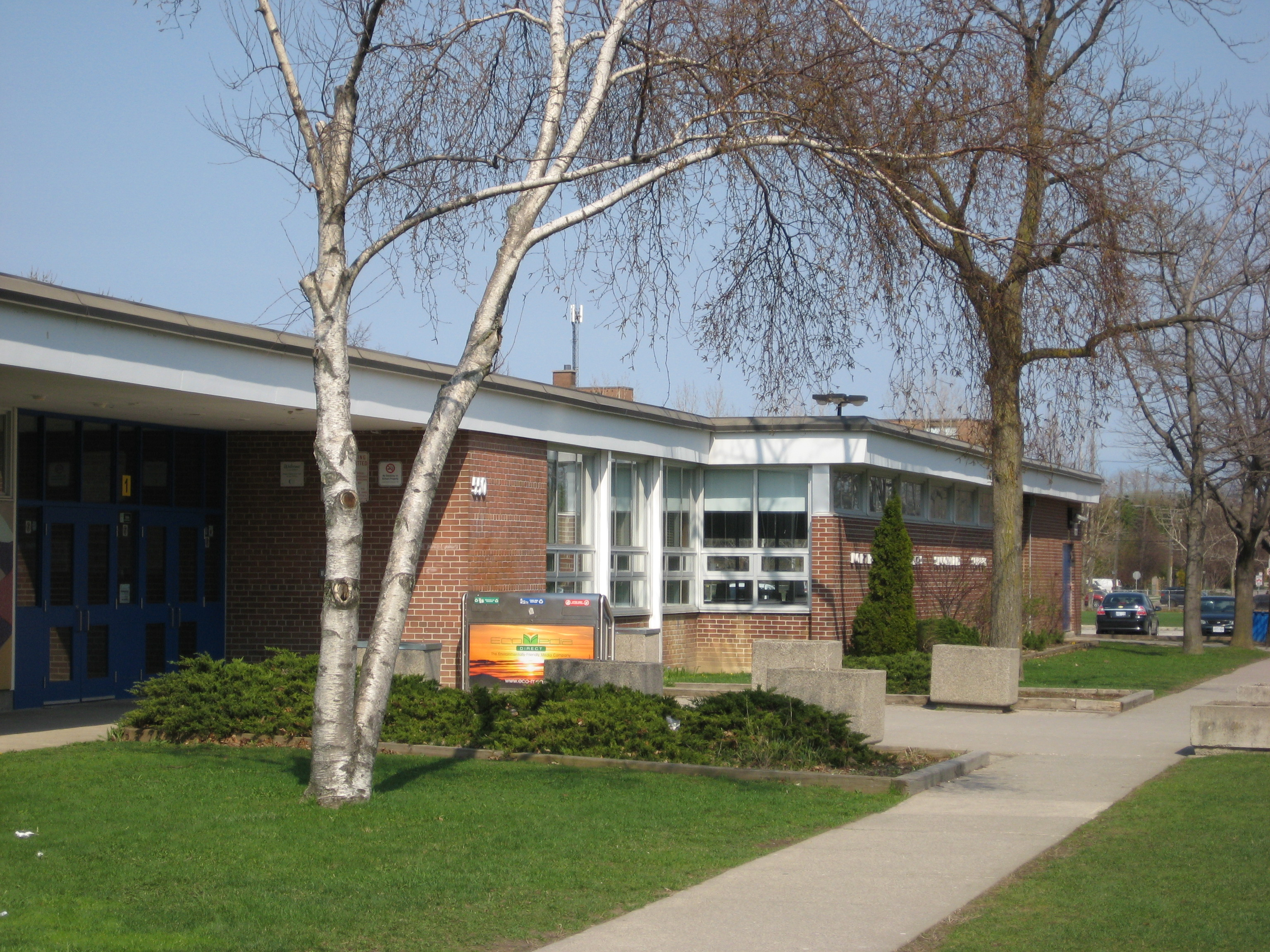

Location
- 550 Finch Avenue West; Toronto, Ontario, M2R 1N6; Canada; 43.7745°N 79.4462°W

Information
- Former name: Northview Heights Collegiate Institute
- School type: Public, High school
- Motto: Scientia-Abor-Vitae ("Tree of Knowledge and Life")
- Founded: 1956
- School board: Toronto District School Board
- Superintendent: Gen Ling Chang
- Area trustee: James Pasternak
- School number: 931020
- Principal: Peter Paputsis
- Grades: 9-12
- Enrolment: 1,506 (2014)
- Language: English
- Schedule type: Semestered
- Area: Toronto
- Colours: Navy and Gold
- Mascot: Phoenix
- Team name: Northview Phoenix
- Website: schoolweb.tdsb.on.ca/northviewheights
- Last updated: October 20, 2026

Northview Heights Secondary School, originally known as Northview Heights Collegiate Institute is a secondary school for grades 9 to 12 in Toronto, Ontario, Canada. It is located in Toronto's north end at the intersection of Bathurst Street and Finch Avenue.

Its feeder schools include Charles H. Best Middle School and Willowdale Middle School. However, there are many students that attend from different regions specifically for the Honours Math, Science, and Technology, CyberARTS, APGA, ICT SHSM (Specialist High Skills Major) and Hospitality SHSM programs.

== See also ==
- Education in Ontario
- List of secondary schools in Ontario
- William Thomson Newnham, former principal (1960-1966) and later President of Seneca College
