= David Agnew (president) =

Canadian academic

President of Seneca Polytechnic
- Incumbent
- Assumed office 2009
- Preceded by: Rick Miner

Personal details
- Born: 1957 (age 68–69) Sherbrooke, Quebec, Canada
- Occupation: Academic Administrator

David Agnew (born 1957) is the current president of Seneca Polytechnic in Toronto, Ontario, Canada. His career has spanned the fields of journalism, politics, public service, the cooperative sector, strategy consulting, international development and dispute resolution.

== Early life ==
Agnew was born in Sherbrooke, Quebec, and was raised in Toronto. At 15, he became a sports reporter for the Toronto Sun and after finishing high school went to St. John's, Newfoundland to join the newsroom of the Evening Telegram. A year later he enrolled as a full-time student at Memorial University of Newfoundland, graduating in 1979 with a Bachelor of Arts degree and the gold medal in political science.

== Public service ==
After a brief stint at the Toronto bureau of Canadian Press, in 1979 he was selected as a parliamentary intern at the House of Commons in Ottawa. He worked for Members of Parliament Bob Rae, then the finance critic for the New Democratic Party, and Jim Peterson of the Liberal Party. A year later, after he had rejoined Canadian Press to work at its Ottawa and Edmonton bureaux, Rae hired him as his executive assistant in Ottawa. In 1982, Rae was elected as leader of the Ontario New Democratic Party and Agnew moved with him to Queen's Park in Toronto. He served Rae as policy advisor, speechwriter, communications director and executive assistant before being named principal secretary to the Leader of the Official Opposition in 1990.

In June, 1990, Premier David Peterson called an early election three years into his term and Agnew was appointed campaign director for the NDP. The campaign ended in an NDP majority government, the first time the NDP had become government in the province. Rae appointed Agnew principal secretary to the Premier and as the main liaison with the public service. In 1992, Rae appointed Agnew as secretary to the cabinet, a controversial move, to ensure the government's agenda was being implemented by the public service. In 1995, the Rae government was defeated by the Ontario Progressive Conservative Party led by Mike Harris.

== Post-government careers ==
After a transition between the Rae and Harris governments that was directed by Agnew, he was seconded to the University of Toronto. He joined Massey College as a senior resident and was named deputy minister of the Public-Private Partnerships Project advising the new premier. In 1996 Agnew joined Credit Union Central of Ontario as executive vice-president and corporate secretary. Three years later, he was recruited by Don Tapscott to Digital4Sight to head up a global research initiative, Governance in the Digital Economy, looking at the impact of technology on democracy and government. He later helped develop the firm’s public sector consulting practice.

In 2002 Agnew was appointed as president and CEO of UNICEF Canada, the first head of the organization recruited from outside the development sector. During his time at UNICEF he raised the organization’s profile in the media and with donors by bringing home accounts of his extensive field visits to the world’s troubled areas, including Darfur in Sudan, Eastern Congo, Sierra Leone, Liberia, Zimbabwe and Indonesia following the devastating tsunami in late 2004. UNICEF’s revenues that year rose to $64.9 million from $28.3 million the year prior.

In 2005 he accepted an appointment as the Ombudsman for Banking Services and Investments, heading the national financial industry dispute resolution service for consumers and small businesses. Over four years as ombudsman he expanded the reach of the service, including bringing in new rules governing how disputes are handled by member firms. In 2009 he became the fifth president of Seneca, one of Canada’s largest polytechnics and colleges.

== Community service ==
Agnew is chair of ventureLAB and past chair of Canada's Drug Agency and Polytechnics Canada. He serves on numerous other boards and committees including the Conference Board of Canada and the Canadian Ditchley Foundation Advisory Board. He also participated in the Council on Foreign Relations Higher Education Working Group. Agnew is a past chair of the board of directors of Sunnybrook Health Sciences Centre and past chair of Colleges Ontario. He served as a member of the Science, Technology and Innovation Council of Canada from 2010 to 2013 and was vice-chair of EQAO, the Education Quality and Accountability Office, from 2018 to 2020. He is also a past member of the board of directors of Colleges and Institutes Canada, the Toronto Region Immigrant Employment Council (TRIEC), the Empire Club of Canada, the Canadian Centre for Financial Literacy and served as the chair of the jury for the 1996 Lionel Gelber Prize for the world’s best non-fiction book in English on foreign affairs.

In 2012, he was awarded the Queen Elizabeth II Diamond Jubilee Medal for his public and community service and in 2018 received the Award of Distinction from the Public Affairs Association of Canada.
