= CyberARTS =

CyberARTS is a multi-disciplinary, integrated six-year arts and technology specialized program which is offered in a number of schools in Toronto for grade 7 to 12 students in Ontario, Canada. The CyberARTS program has been honoured by Maclean's magazine as one of the best programs in Canada. Many international delegates come from the UK, Spain, the United States and China to study the unique model of this program. In addition to learning art, design, and technology, the students are also taught about important skills such as organization, work ethic, presentation skills, professionalism, career building and post-secondary planning.

== Program creation and location ==
The CyberARTS program was created in 1995 by a group of educators, principals Sharron Forrest, Tito Faria, Jon Mergler, Mike Morey, Linda Newnham, Terry Wensley, Doris Fleming, Katherine Yamashita and Lesley Monette who saw a need for enriched learning through the arts and had a unique vision for digital arts at the [high school and middle school levels. Their purpose was to develop a program for students wanting to specialize in particular subjects within the combined areas of the arts and technology. Art is the foundation of the digital program.

Support for the program initially came from the Don Mills Collegiate Institute, Don Mills Middle School, Northview Heights Secondary School and the North York Board of Education's Computers in Education Program. The program had educational partnerships with businesses such as Alias/SGIWavefront, Apple Canada, Kodak Canada, Rogers Communications and Softimage and organizations like the Textile Museum of Canada, the Art Gallery of Ontario, Ontario College of Art & Design, Sheridan College and the University of Waterloo School of Architecture.

CyberARTS is offered at the following middle and high schools: Charles H. Best Middle School, Don Mills Collegiate Institute, Don Mills Middle School, Northview Heights Secondary School, Western Technical-Commercial School, Lakeshore Collegiate Institute and Innisdale Secondary School.

== Structure ==
CyberARTS is an integrated program in which students gain credits in Visual Art, Media Literacy, Communications Technology, Computer Science, Music, Drama, Dance, Media Studies and Co-op. Curriculum in CyberARTS is designed so that the teacher is a facilitator, manager and producer while students take an active role in problem solving the task at hand whether it be creating or publishing children's books' authoring interactive CD-ROMS, organizing a conference or creating a traditional portrait. Each lesson unit in CyberARTS has an integration of at least two of the main CyberARTS subject areas and results in the completion of a major project. Staff and students at both levels work together to expand and improve the knowledge gained by students participating in the projects. The knowledge gained by students on these projects may assist them to make educational and vocational decisions. CyberARTS is also committed to both formal and informal experiences in Cooperative education and seeks in the development of curriculum to provide "real world" projects that extend beyond the classroom. Credits are granted for each course delivered to meet the Ministry outcomes.

CyberARTS students are expected to contribute to the program, school and/or greater community. These community hours will involve student application of their artistic, creative design and technological abilities in a variety of areas. Some examples include:

- Graphic design for the school newspaper or yearbook
- Environmental design for the science program
- Fashion design for the DMCI Fashion Show
- Stage Design for the Drama and Music Program
- Web design for individual programs at DMCI

Students are encouraged to take on leadership roles in these activities as part of the curriculum and skills training.

Teachers of the CyberARTs program specialize in visual art education and have had a background as a working professional involved in some aspect of the visual arts. Former experience includes being artists, filmmakers, curators, art administrators, designers and graphic artists.

== Entrance Requirements ==
Entry to the high school program is based on a successful interview, and application package. The interview involves completing a creative activity, such as a still life drawing. The potential student will be assessed in a 15-minute face to face interview with two CyberARTS teachers, and two senior CyberARTS students. It is recommended that the student brings a portfolio and sketchbook. The application package includes a student information sheet, an interest and background form (for students applying in grade 7 or 8 only), a parent nomination form, a creative writing piece, a self-portrait (using only a pencil), and a release of information form. Prospective students are required submit this package to the school of their choice by the beginning of the year.
