= W. Roy McCutcheon =

Canadian educator (1929–2019)

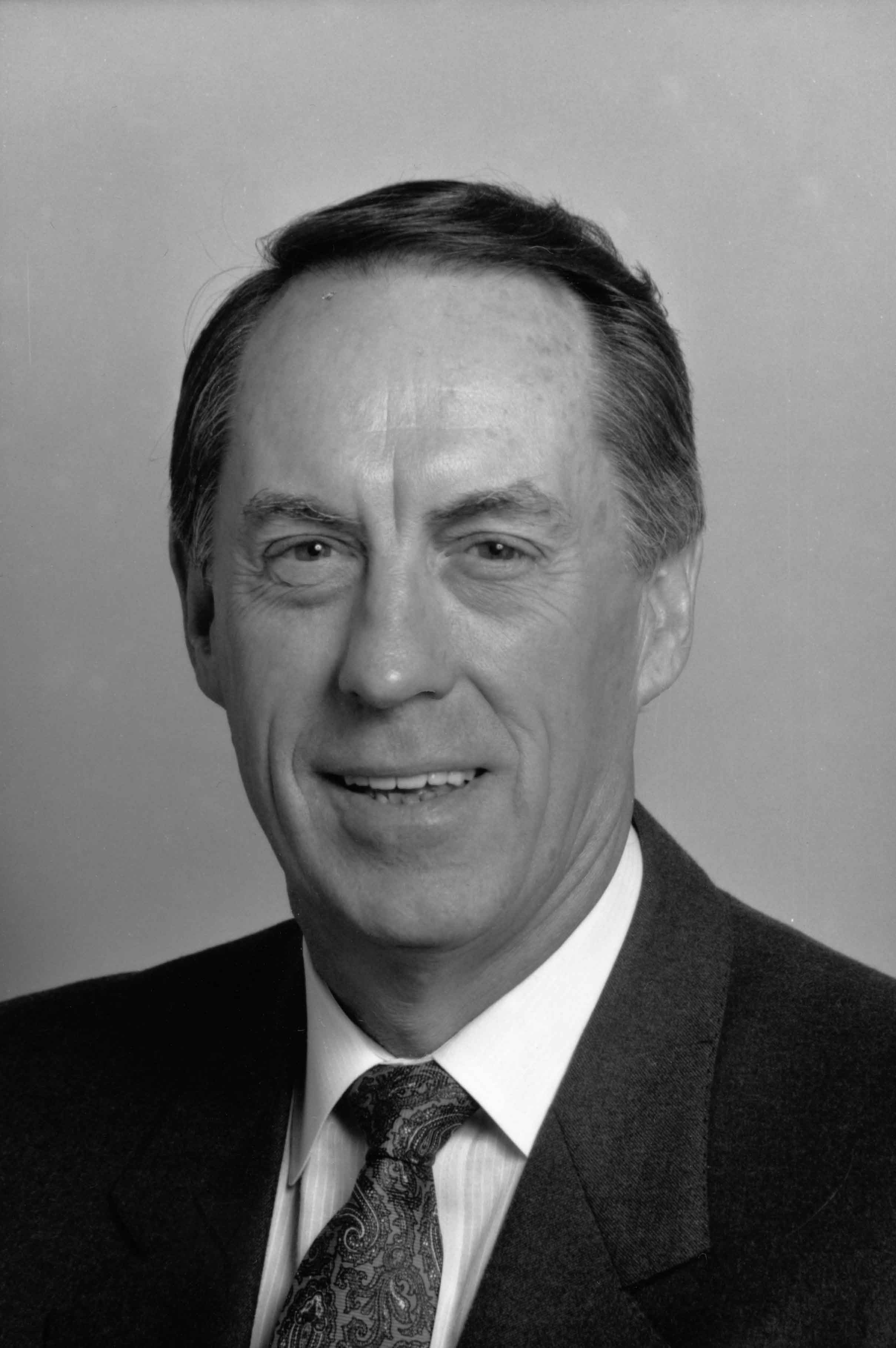
- William Roy McCutcheon, President of Seneca College from 1984 – 1992

President of Seneca College
- In office 1984–1992
- Preceded by: William Thomson Newnham
- Succeeded by: Steve Quinlan

Personal details
- Born: July 31, 1929
- Died: July 30, 2019 (aged 89)
- Occupation: Academic Administrator
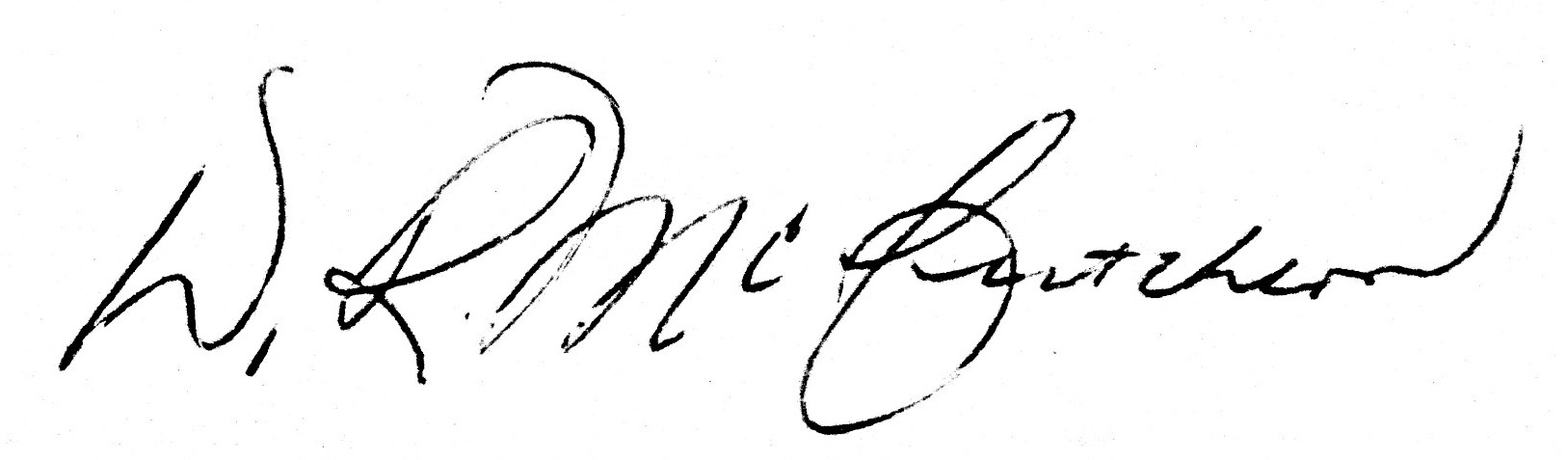
- Signature

William Roy McCutcheon (July 31, 1929 – July 30, 2019) was a Canadian educator and the second president of Seneca College serving from 1984 through 1992.

President McCutcheon announced his retirement in 1991. Following the announcement, senior Vice-President Steve Quinlan was appointed Seneca's third President effective February 1, 1992.

McCutcheon died on July 30, 2019, on the eve of his 90th birthday.
