= Rick Miner =

Canadian educator and college president

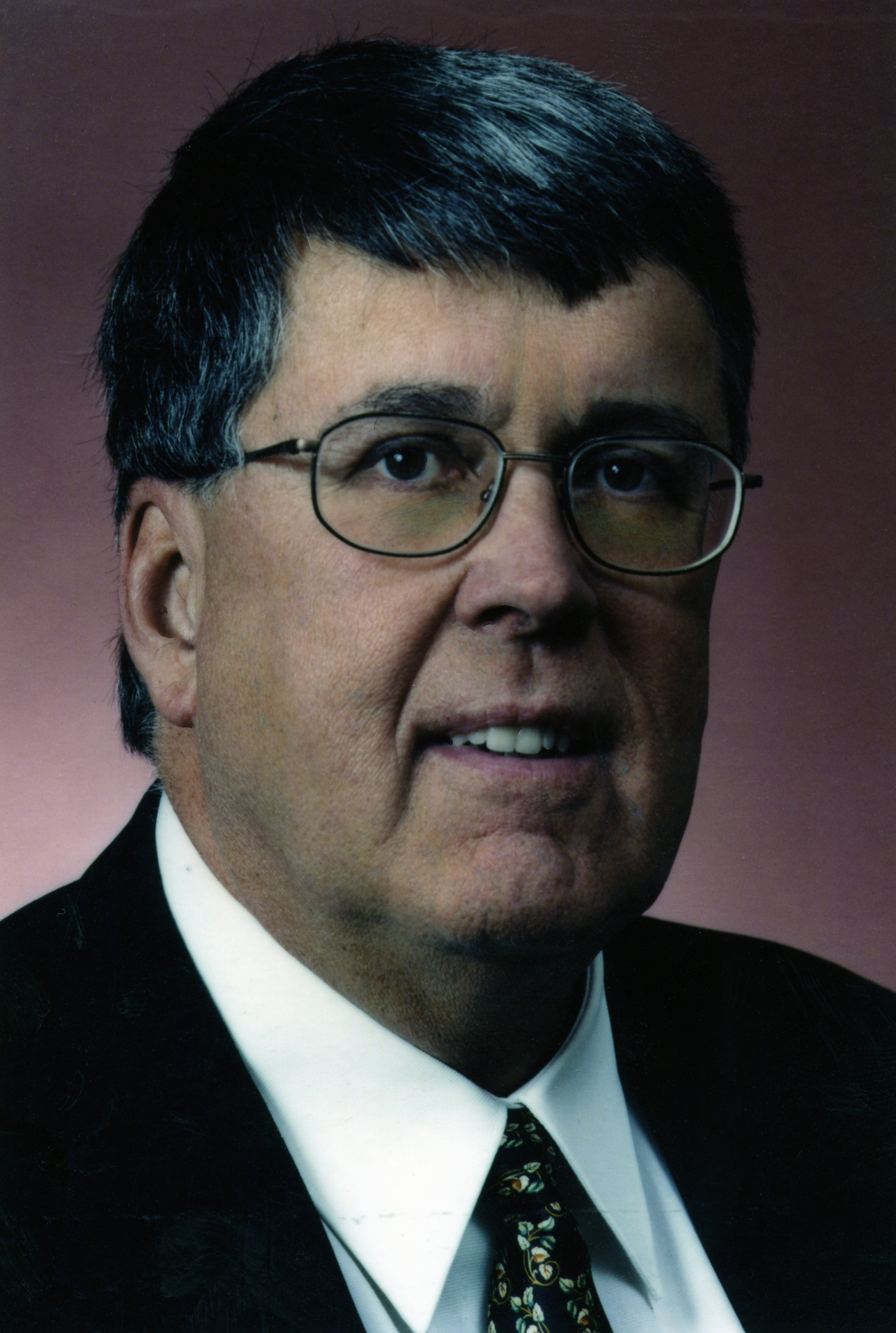
- Rick Miner, President of Seneca College from 2001 - 2009

President of Seneca College
- In office 2001–2009
- Preceded by: Steve Quinlan
- Succeeded by: David Agnew

Personal details
- Occupation: academic administrator

Rick Miner is a Canadian educator and the fourth president of Seneca College serving from 2001 through 2009. Miner succeeded President Steve Quinlan.

Prior to Seneca, Dr. Miner was Vice-President at the University of New Brunswick and served as Director of the Canada/China Language and Cultural Program, Dean of Commerce and MBA Director at Saint Mary’s University in Nova Scotia.

Dr. Miner's time at Seneca included the opening of the TEL Building, a major restoration of the existing buildings at Newnham Campus, and the creation of Markham Campus.

During his tenure, the number of degrees offered at the college grew, and Seneca surpassed 100,000 full- and part-time enrolments.

Dr. Miner strongly believed in building Seneca’s national identity, and in 2007, he served as the Commissioner of the New Brunswick’s Commission on Post-Secondary Education.
