= Wiz Kilo =

Canadian singer

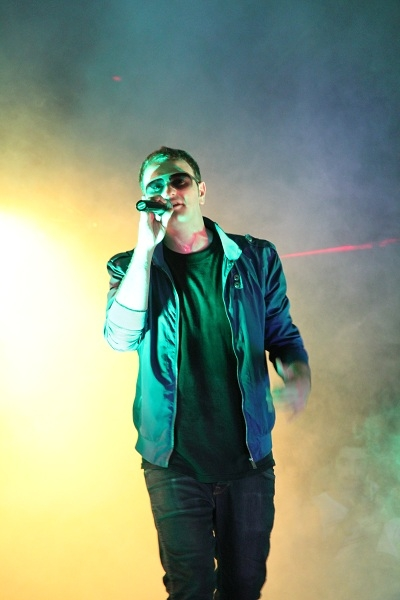
- Wiz Kilo performance

Background information
- Also known as: Wiz
- Born: Wissam Kilo; March 5, 1984 (age 42)
- Origin: Aleppo, Syria
- Genres: Hip hop, pop, R&B, electronic music, urban
- Occupations: Singer, songwriter, record producer, musician, hip hop instructor, actor, model
- Instruments: Vocals, piano, keyboard
- Years active: 2002–present
- Website: wizkilo.com

Wissam Kilo (born March 5, 1984), better known by his stage name Wiz Kilo, is a Canadian hip hop and electronic artist, songwriter, music producer, dancer, actor, model and hip hop instructor.

== Early years ==
Born in 1984 in Aleppo, Syria, Wissam Kilo immigrated with his Syrian family to Canada when he was 5 years old. He studied communications and acting in Vanier College, Montreal, Quebec and in Seneca College in Toronto.

In 2002, at the age of 18, he joined Quebec boy band 2Much alongside Marc Trottier, Martin Blanchett and Eric Chamberland. Wissam Kilo was known as "Wiz" in the band. They were promoted as one of the best upcoming boy bands in Quebec in competition with the boy band InMotion. They had major appearances on several occasions on the specialized Quebec music station MusiquePlus with interviews and live performances. They had many successful concerts in Montreal and Ottawa.

== Solo career ==
When the band 2Much split up, Wiz decided to go solo, writing and producing his own material. He wrote the single "Move So Sexy" produced by German producer YL. The single enjoyed great popularity online and opened the door for him to tour in Europe, later in 2008. He took part in international songwriting competition reaching the semi-finals with the song "Got Me Like" that he co-wrote with fellow artist and then production-partner Jordan Setacci.

He released his independent debut EP entitled Wiz Kilo in 2007, followed by the self-produced EP FRSHLSS in 2008 with songs he wrote and produced while on tour in Switzerland and Germany.

He released B4III in preparation for a third album. It was composed of materials from the first two albums in addition to further tracks by him and producers from the Netherlands and Germany. B4III was sold as a promotional CD during concerts and shows, and has resulted in 2 singles / music videos from the CD, namely "Stüsh 2Nite" and "Delete".

In 2010, he met producer Yann Simhon, with whom he collaborated with for a while. This resulted in Wiz Kilo being featured as vocalist for producers Hijackman & Vittorio Ian's international release "American Dream", a hit Wiz Kilo had co-wrote. The single was released on the French label Hype Traxx and was remixed featuring Montreal-based VJ Malik Shaheed.

A two-time International Songwriting Competition semi-finalist, he has also toured many countries with his music including Canada (Montreal, Ottawa, Toronto), United States (New York, Buffalo, Las Vegas), Germany and Switzerland. He also appeared in The Village Underground and Mobile Beat DJ Show (in New York & Las Vegas). He has talen in a number of festivals including Grand-Prix Weekend, Gay Pride and Latin Fest in Montreal and in many clubs and school tours.

In 2013, he released two videos and singles titled "Ovah U" and "Coming 4 U" and in 2014 had a major album release with the album Jungle Disco which he wrote, self-produced and recorded on his own. The album was a fusion of hip hop, electro music and synth pop with sincere self-reflective lyrics and R&B and soul influences. He has also launched music videos for the title track "Jungle Disco" as well as for "DirtyThirty" and "Warmbody". "Black Clouds" and its accompanying video is a lead single from the new album.

== Personal life and in popular culture ==
In addition to writing and producing music, Wiz Kilo was a dancer and a hip hop instructor for youth for many years including at the American Dance Training Camp and "Enfant et Compagnie". He also taught dance and inter rhythm arts at youth camps in New Hampshire.

He has appeared on an episode of Date My Playlist on MTV.

He also does modeling, advertising (Foot Locker, BandAid and Tourisme Québec) and is a member of the Canadian Actors Association (ACTRA).

== Discography ==
=== Albums and EPs ===
| Title and details | Notes |
|---|---|
| Wiz Kilo EP: Type: EP; Released: 2007 | No. / Title / Length; 1. / "What's the Deal"; 2. / "Lay Wit U"; 3. / "Random feat. Kiss Da Girlz"; 4. / "Move So Sexy feat. Young Smilez"; 5. / "How"; 6. / "Let Me Do (What I Do)"; 7. / "Say Is True"; 8. / "Countin' Dayz" |
| FRSHLSS: Released: 2008 | No. / Title / Length; 1. / "Frshlss"; 2. / "Str8 Up"; 3. / "Sunshine"; 4. / "Actin'"; 5. / "Sumbody Like Her" |
| B4III: Type: Promotional album; Released: 2010 | No. / Title / Length; 1. / "Fallin' 4 U"; 2. / "Famous"; 3. / "Random"; 4. / "What's the Deal"; 5. / "U A Star"; 6. / "Control Freak"; 7. / "Str8 Up"; 8. / "Stüsh 2Nite"; 9. / "Delete"; 10. / "Lay Wit U"; 11. / "Sumbody Like Her"; 12. / "Frshlss"; 13. / "Let Me Do (What I Do)"; 14. / "Move So Sexy"; 15. / "Sunshine"; 16. / "How"; 17. / "Actin'"; 18. / "Say Is True"; 19. / "Countin' Dayz" |
| Jungle Disco: Type: Album; Released: 7 July 2014 | No. / Title / Length; 1. / "DirtyThirty" / 5:47; 2. / "4Seasons" / 5:12; 3. / "Paid My Dues" / 7:07; 4. / "Jungle Disco" / 4:23; 5. / "Warmbody" / 7:24; 6. / "Some Nerve" / 4:50; 7. / "Off the Bassline" / 4:05; 8. / "Black Clouds" / 4:40; 9. / "Strangers in Luv" / 4:16; 10. / "Such Is Life" / 4:33 |

==== Singles ====
- 2005: "Move So Sexy"
- 2010: "Stüsh 2Nite"
- 2010: "Delete"
- 2010: "Fallin' 4 U"
- 2011: "Control Freak"
- 2013: "Ovah U"
- 2013: "Coming 4 U"
- 2013: "Luvsong"
- 2013: "First.of.all"
- 2014: "2 My Tune"
- 2014: "Jungle Disco"
- 2014: "DirtyThirty"
- 2014: "Warmbody"
- 2014: "Black Clouds"
- 2014: "4Seasons"
- 2016: "Nocturnal"

Featured in

- 2011: "American Dream" (Hijackman & Vitorio Ian feat. Wiz Kilo)
