= Powerlifting at the 2004 Summer Paralympics – Women's 40 kg =

Women's Up To 40 kg at the XII Paralympic Games
- Paralympic Powerlifting
- Venue: Nikaia Olympic Weightlifting Hall
- Dates: 20 September 2004
- Competitors: 8 from 8 nations
- Winning weight(kg): 105.0

Medalists
1st place, gold medalist(s)		Lidiya Solovyova	Ukraine
2nd place, silver medalist(s)		Ijeoma John	Nigeria
3rd place, bronze medalist(s)		Laura Cerero Gabriel	Mexico

The Women's 40 kg powerlifting event at the 2004 Summer Paralympics was competed on 20 September. It was won by Lidiya Solovyova, representing Ukraine.

== Final round ==
20 Sept. 2004, 16:30

Rank	Athlete	Weight(kg)	Notes
1st place, gold medalist(s)	Lidiya Solovyova (UKR)	105.0	WR
2nd place, silver medalist(s)	Ijeoma John (NGR)	97.5	
3rd place, bronze medalist(s)	Laura Cerero Gabriel (MEX)	85.0	
4	Jia You Hua (CHN)	80.0	
5	Malika Matar (MAR)	75.0	
6	Nancy Martinez (ECU)	75.0	
7	Sally Thomas (CAN)	62.5	
	Lu Li Hua (TPE)	DSQ	
