= Nanda Lwin =

Canadian music historian and journalist

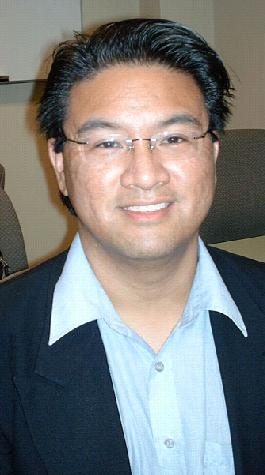
- Nanda Lwin
- Born: August 31, 1971 (age 54); London, Ontario
- Occupations: author, journalist, professor, engineer
- Writing career
- Period: 1995–present
- Subject: music
- Website: www.nandalwin.com

Nanda Layos Lwin (born August 31, 1971, in London, Ontario) is a Canadian author, music historian, journalist, civil engineer, and educator. He wrote the weekly ChartTalk column, a commentary of the current Canadian music charts; it appeared on canoe.ca from 1997 to 2002 and in The Hamilton Spectator from 2003 to 2006. He is the author and publisher of eight books including Top 40 Hits: The Essential Chart Guide (1999) and Top Albums: The Essential Chart Guide (2003), primarily documenting the chart history of the Canadian music magazine The Record.

Lwin holds a bachelor's degree in civil engineering from the University of Toronto and a master's degree in engineering and public policy from McMaster University and is a licensed professional engineer in Ontario. He is currently teaching civil engineering technology at Seneca College of Applied Arts and Technology.

== Books written by Lwin ==
Lwin has authored the following books:

- The Record 1994 Chart Almanac (1995) (ISBN 1-896594-00-X).
- The Canadian Singles Chart Book (1996) (ISBN 1-896594-09-3).
- Canada's Top Hits of the Year (1997) (ISBN 1-896594-10-7).
- The 1996 Country Chart Yearbook (1997) (ISBN 1-896594-11-5).
- Canada's Top 1000 Singles (1998) (ISBN 1-896594-12-3).
- Top 40 Hits: The Essential Chart Guide (1999) (ISBN 1-896594-13-1).
- Top Albums: The Essential Chart Guide (2003) (ISBN 1-896594-14-X).
- The Essential 2002 Chart Yearbook (2003) (ISBN 1-896594-15-8).

== See also ==
- Canadian Singles Chart
- Nielsen SoundScan
- Nielsen Broadcast Data Systems
- The Record
