= Canadian music charts =

Music charts in Canada

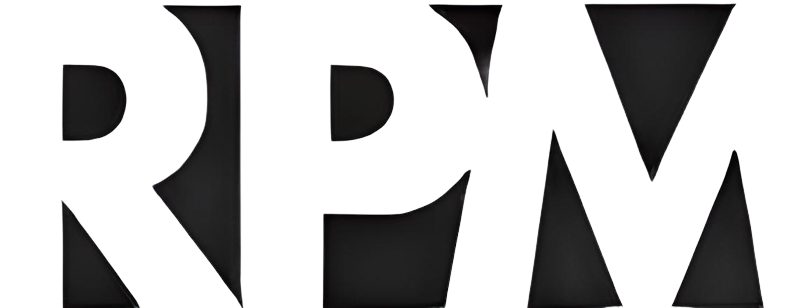
RPM (1964–2000) and Billboard (1996–present) are among the providers of music charts in Canada.

The Canadian music charts are a collection of record charts reflecting the music consumption of people in Canada. RPM, The Record, and Billboard are among the publications to have published Canadian national charts over the decades. However, the first Canadian music chart was published by radio station CHUM AM in 1957. The oldest music publication in Canada, RPM featured music charts from 1964 to 2000.

Nielsen SoundScan began tracking retail sales in November 1996. It was published every Wednesday and also published on Thursday by Jam!/Canoe. The singles chart also appeared in Billboard until March 2006, when Billboard stopped publishing the retail singles chart in favor of the Canadian Digital Song Sales chart. The Canadian Hot 100 was launched by Billboard on June 7, 2007, and remains the standard music chart in Canada for songs, alongside Billboard Canadian Albums for albums.

== History ==
The oldest Canadian music chart was CHUM Chart, which debuted on May 27, 1957, under the name CHUM's Weekly Hit Parade by Toronto radio station CHUM AM. It was considered the de facto national chart of Canada until 1964, when RPM magazine was founded. RPM was the oldest music industry publication in Canada and published Canadian national record charts from June 22, 1964 until its final issue on November 13, 2000.

In the 1960s, the Canadian music industry was disparate and regionally focused, and English-speaking Canadian artists were often overlooked in favour of American acts. To encourage a more national focus and ensure that domestic artists were promoted across Canada, the Maple Leaf System (MLS) was set up in 1969. The MLS produced its own national singles chart, which Billboard magazine reproduced as Canada's entry in its weekly Hits of the World section. The MLS struggled to achieve widespread support in Canada, however, particularly as participating radio stations failed to give the nominated Canadian records the requisite national airplay.

In 1983, The Record magazine began publishing various industry charts. The retail singles and albums charts of The Record were based on a national sample of sales reports given by Canadian retailers and rack jobbers. The charts were published in the Hits of the World section of U.S. magazine Billboard, and was featured in various newspapers across the country via The Canadian Press. The Record also published five radio airplay charts - contemporary hit radio, album oriented rock, country, adult contemporary, hot adult contemporary. It ceased publishing the retail singles chart in 1996, due to a lack of sales reports owing to declining single sales in the country.

In November 1996, Nielsen SoundScan started compiling sales charts in Canada. When the chart was started in 1996, there were 200 positions (with the top 50 being published by Jam! and the top 10 being published by Billboard). By the late 1990s, physical single sales in Canada had greatly declined. In April 1999, Billboard described Canada's singles market as "dire" and Doug Spence, Director of the Canadian operations of SoundScan, said: "there's no singles market here". Due to the limited amount of commercially available physical singles, singles began remaining on the chart for lengthy periods of time. Elton John's charity single "Candle in the Wind '97"/"Something About the Way You Look Tonight" spent 45 weeks at number one despite selling only one million copies in its first two years of release in the country. It stayed in the top twenty for three years.

With the growing popularity of digital music downloads in the mid-2000s, physical single sales in Canada declined further, and in March 2006, Billboard reported that most of the then-recent number-one singles on the Canadian Singles Chart had sold less than 200 copies. In March 2006, Nielsen Entertainment Canada created the Canadian Digital Songs Chart, which tracked sales of digital music downloads, and Billboard stopped publishing the Canadian Singles Chart in favor of the new chart. However, the chart continued to be published on Jam!.

Billboard introduced its own singles chart for Canada, the Canadian Hot 100, on June 7, 2007. Similar to the US Billboard Hot 100, the chart is based on digital download single sales and streaming data from Nielsen SoundScan and radio audience levels from Nielsen BDS.

== Album charts ==
- RPM 100 Albums
- RPM Country Albums
- The Record Top Albums
- Billboard Canadian Albums

== Singles charts ==
- CHUM Chart (1957–1986)
- RPM Top Singles (1964–2000)
- CRIA Top 50 singles (September 1977 to 1980)
- CBC Singles chart (starting 1980)
- The Record Retail Singles chart (1983–1996)
- Nielsen SoundScan retail singles chart (1996–2006)
- Billboard Canadian Hot 100 (2007–present)
- Music Canada Top 20 Tracks

== See also ==
- List of number-one singles in Canada

== Further research ==
- Lwin, Nanda (August 1996). The Canadian Singles Chart Book – Music Data Canada. ISBN 1-896594-09-3.
- Lwin, Nanda (September 1999). Top 40 Hits: The Essential Chart Guide – Music Data Canada. p. 384. ISBN 1-896594-13-1.
- Lwin, Nanda (2000). Top 40 Hits: The Essential Chart Guide. Music Data Canada. ISBN 1-896594-13-1.
