= Sally Thomas (powerlifter) =

Personal information
- Born: November 15, 1970 (age 55)
- Home town: Toronto, Ontario, Canada
- Education: Algonquin College

Sport
- Sport: Paralympic powerlifting

Sally Thomas (born November 15, 1970) is a Canadian para-powerlifter and accessibility advocate. She represented Canada at the 2004 and 2008 Summer Paralympics.

== Early life ==
At birth, Thomas was diagnosed with spina bifida and hydrocephalus. She was adopted when she was 12 and grew up in Belleville and Toronto, Ontario. involved in sports as a child, focusing primarily on track. When she was eighteen, Thomas's brother died suddenly. In 1989, she moved to Ottawa to study recreation at Algonquin College.

== Career ==
=== Sports ===
Thomas qualified for the 100m and 200m races in wheelchair racing for the 1996 and 2000 Summer Paralympics based on time, but did not it qualify for those Canadian Paralympic teams. She took up powerlifting in 2000.

Thomas became the first female Canadian to compete in Paralympic powerlifting at the Athens 2004 Paralympics. She set a Canadian record and placed seventh out of eight in her weight class. She competed again in the event at the 2008 Summer Paralympics. Thomas has earned more than 70 medals in her powerlifting career.

=== Advocacy ===
Thomas's activism began in 2001, when she joined a Para Transpo strike. She has been involved in para transit issues since then and has also advocated for affordable housing for people on the Ontario Disability Support Program. In 2006, she was among several of Canada's Paralympic athletes who went to Parliament Hill as part of Parliamentary Sport and Physical Activity Forum, advocating for more opportunities for disabled youth to participate in sport.

== Personal life ==
Loans for Thomas's parapowerlifting training resulted in her having to declare bankruptcy. In 2012, she had a serious sepsis infection that almost resulted in her death. While recovering for five months in hospital, she took up painting.
