= Ijeoma John =

Nigerian Paralympic athlete

Personal information
- Nationality: Nigerian
Medal record
Representing Nigeria
Women's powerlifting
Paralympic Games
Silver medal – second place	2004 Athens	40 kg

Ijeoma John is a Nigerian paralympian athlete. She won silver medal at the 40 kg category of the powerlifting event at 2004 Summer Paralympics.
