= William Thomson Newnham =

Canadian educator (1923–2014)

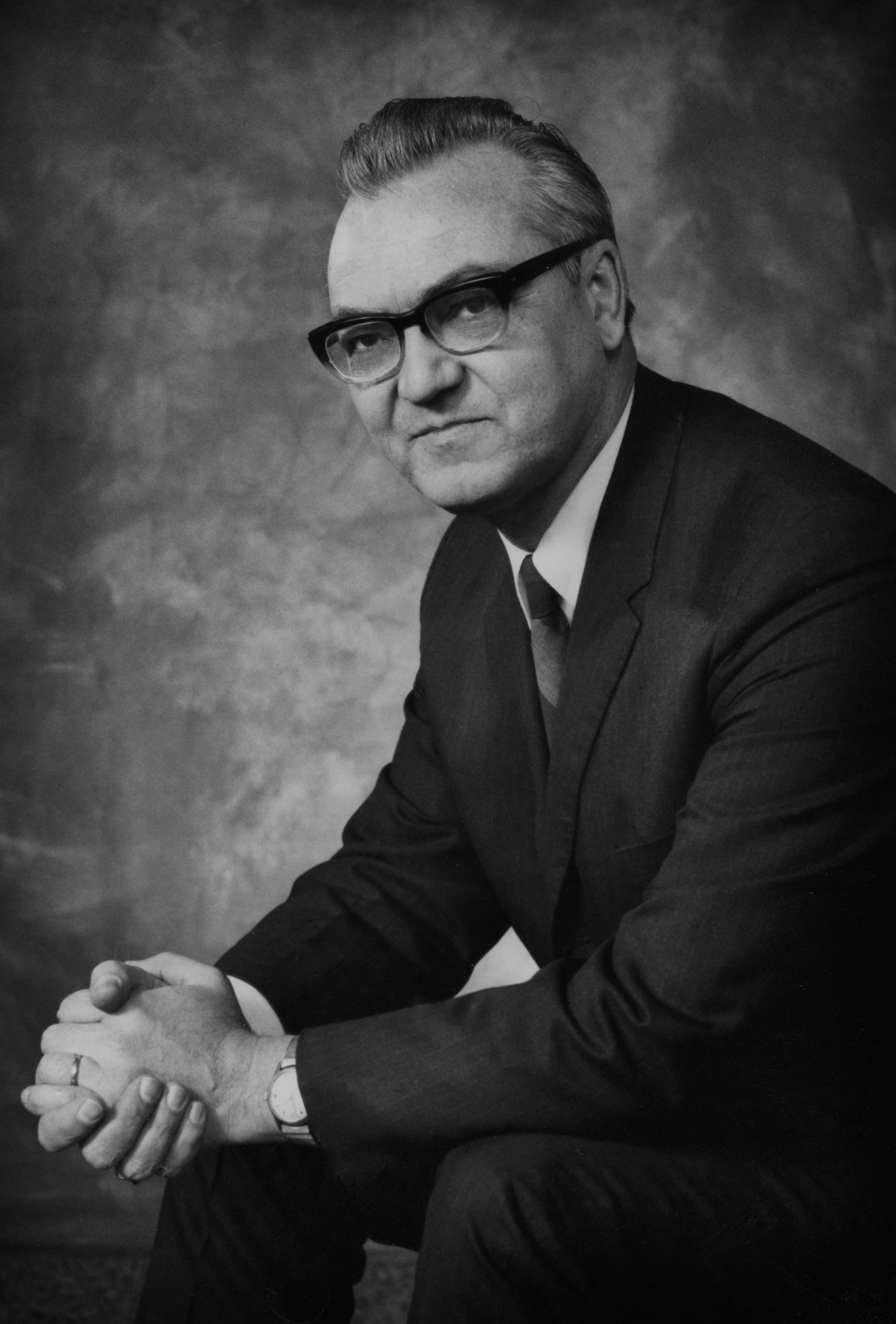
- William T. Newnham, President of Seneca College from 1966 - 1984

President of Seneca College
- In office 1966–1984
- Preceded by: Office established
- Succeeded by: W. Roy McCutcheon

Personal details
- Born: February 7, 1923 Shallow Lake, Ontario, Canada
- Died: August 23, 2014 (aged 91) Markham, Ontario, Canada
- Education: Queen's University
- Occupation: academic administrator
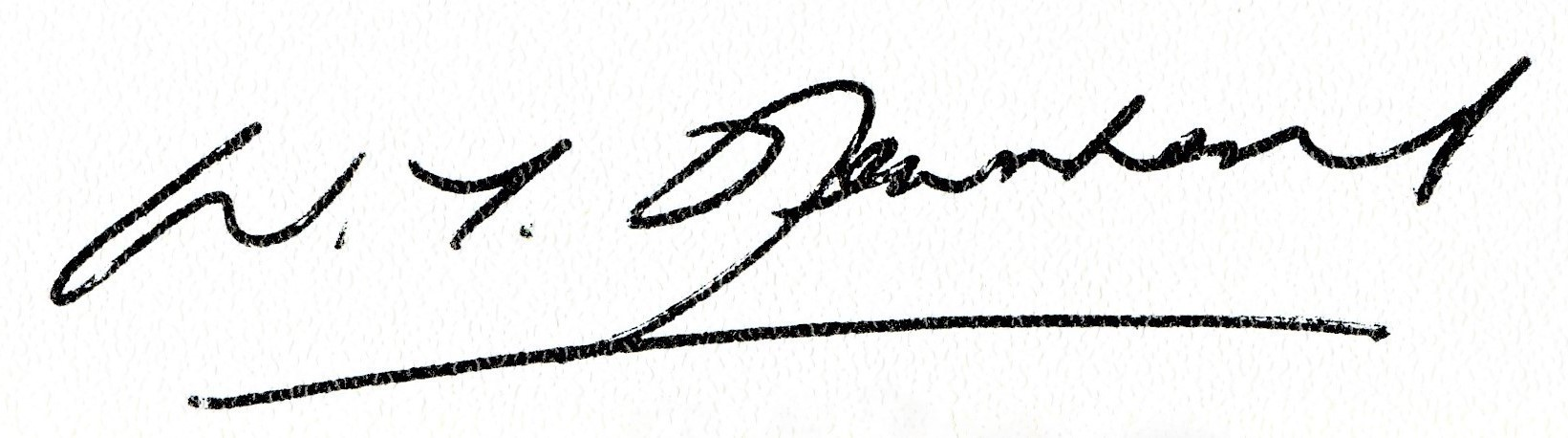
- Signature

William Thomson Newnham (February 7, 1923 – August 23, 2014) was a Canadian educator and the first president of Seneca College serving from 1966 through 1984.

== Early life ==
Newnham was born in Shallow Lake, Ontario.

After serving in the Royal Canadian Air Force in World War II, Newnham went to Queen's University to study physics and math.

Following his graduation Newnham became a teacher and later was the principal of Northview Heights Secondary School in North York from 1960 to 1966.

== President of Seneca College (1966-1984) ==
Newnham became President of Seneca College in 1966 and served until 1984.

During his time in office, Newnham saw the expansion of the college from the Sheppard/Yonge locations to prominent campuses on Finch Avenue, and in King City and Markham (Buttonville Airport).

Under President Newnham's leadership, Seneca pioneered teaching in areas that were new to colleges, such as computing courses, and became a leader in international outreach.

Throughout his life Newnham authored several books about the teaching profession.

== Honors ==
Seneca's main campus in North York, Newnham Campus, was renamed in his honour in 1984. The campus was formerly known as Finch Campus.

== Personal life ==
After retirement, William Newnham lived in Unionville, Ontario.

=== Death ===
William Newnham died in Markham, Ontario from natural causes, aged 91, August 23, 2014.
