= Donald Mills (footballer) =

Australian rules footballer

Personal information
- Full name: Donald Ian Grainger Mills
- Born: 28 August 1909; Saint Saviour, Jersey
- Died: 5 January 1945 (aged 35); Port Franklin, Victoria
- Original team: Clayton
- Height: 182 cm (6 ft 0 in)
- Weight: 79 kg (174 lb)

Playing career^{1}
| Years | Club | Games (Goals) |
| 1929, 1931 | Hawthorn | 15 (0) |
- ^{1} Playing statistics correct to the end of 1931.

Donald Ian Grainger Mills (28 August 1909 – 5 January 1945) was an Australian rules footballer who played with Hawthorn in the Victorian Football League (VFL).

== Family ==
The son of Donald Albert Grainger Mills (181–1951), and Isabel Jane Mills (1885–1942), née Le Brun, Donald Ivas Grainger Mills was born at Saint Saviour, Jersey, in the Channel Islands on 28 August 1909.

He married Jean Mary Thomson (1915–2000) on 15 October 1940.

== Death ==
He died in early 1945 when, with his brother-in-law, Mark Johns, he was aboard the shark-fishing vessel Moonbi that failed to return from a fishing trip from Port Franklin.
