= Charles H. Best Middle School =

Middle school in Ontario, Canada

Coordinates: 43.76734°N 79.45882°W

Charles H. Best Middle School is a middle school in North York, Ontario, for Grade 4 to 8 students. It is located near Dufferin Street and Finch Avenue, in the Bathurst Manor residential area. The school was named Dufferin Heights Junior High until 1978, when it was renamed in honour of Charles Best, one of the co-discoverers of insulin.

== Specialized Programs ==
C.H. Best MS is known for its CyberARTS program, a multi-disciplinary program for grade 7 and 8 students integrating technology and multi-media. The school also has several specialized classes including Learning Disabilities and Resource (HSP) classes, a Developmental Delay class, and an Intermediate Autism class.
