= Seneca Polytechnic =

Public college in Toronto, Ontario, Canada

Seneca College of Applied Arts and Technology
- Other name: Seneca Polytechnic
- Type: Public
- Established: 1966
- Affiliations: Colleges Ontario, Canadian Collegiate Athletic Association, Colleges and Institutes Canada, Canadian Bureau for International Education, Polytechnics Canada, Ontario Colleges Athletic Association
- Chair: Winston Stewart
- President: David Agnew
- Students: 30,000 full-time and 60,000 part-time annually (2025: 17,330 FTEs)
- Undergraduates: Available
- Postgraduates: Available
- Location: Toronto, Ontario, Canada; 43°47′44″N 79°20′56″W
- Campus: Urban
- Colours: Red
- Nickname: The Sting
- Mascot: Sammy Sting
- Website: www.senecapolytechnic.ca

Seneca College of Applied Arts and Technology, branded as Seneca Polytechnic since 2023, is a multi-campus public college in the Greater Toronto Area and Peterborough, Ontario, Canada. It offers full-time and part-time programs at the baccalaureate, diploma, certificate, and graduate levels.

== History ==
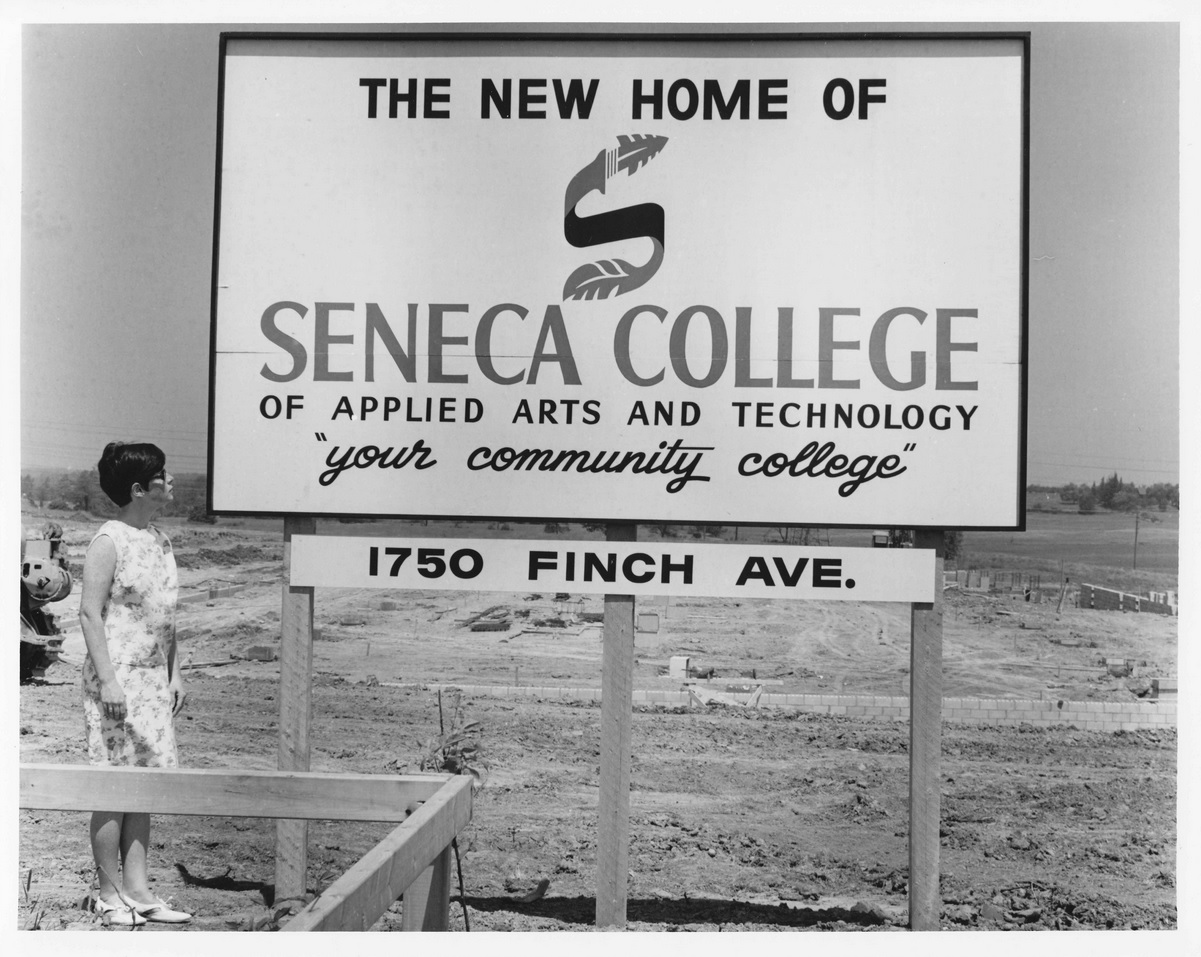
A sign marks the future site of Seneca's Finch Campus (renamed Newnham Campus in 1984), June 1968.

Seneca opened in 1967 as part of a provincial initiative to establish an Ontario-wide network of colleges of applied arts and technology providing career-oriented diploma and certificate courses as well as continuing education programs to Ontario communities. The province was responding to the increasing need for sophisticated applied learning as technology continued to change the nature of work and the provincial economy. General education was considered an important element in post secondary education, and breadth courses continue to be a part of every program. In 2001, the colleges were granted the ability to offer baccalaureate degrees. Seneca is one of five Institute of Technology and Advanced Learning that can offer up to 15 per cent of its program activity at the degree level.

== Campuses ==
Seneca has campus locations throughout the Greater Toronto Area and in Peterborough.

=== Newnham Campus ===
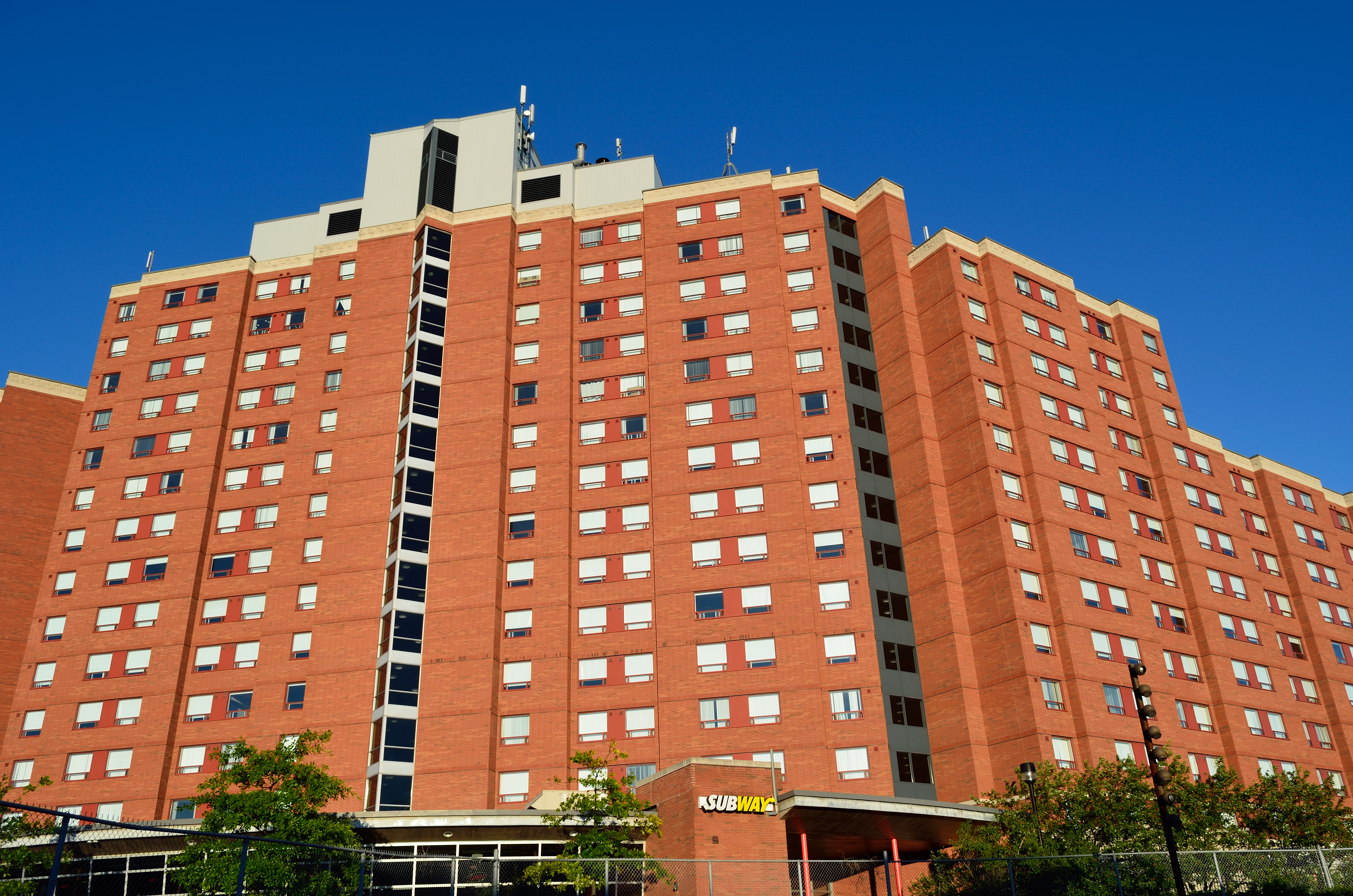
Newnham Campus's 1,113-bed student residence opened in 1998

The Newnham Campus is one of the largest college campuses in Canada. It has more than 15,000 full-time students in business, engineering, aviation, early childhood education, fashion, opticianry, information and communications technology, and liberal arts. The campus, initially known as Finch Campus, was renamed in 1984 after founding president William Thomson Newnham, and is also the site of continuing education activity during the evenings and weekends. The campus includes a 1,113-bed residence, sports centre, and daycare centre. It is located west of the intersection of Highway 404 and Finch Avenue East.

The campus's first building was opened in 1969 and has involved various architects (William H.D. Hurst (Phase 1); John B. Parkin (Phase 2 with Searle, Wilbee and Rowland); Abram, Nowski, and McLaughlin (arena)). In 1973 a 100 m^{2} (1,100 ft^{2}) domed planetarium was added to the Phase 3 section of the campus, but it has since closed.

In fall 2011, a 19,000 m^{2} (200,000 ft^{2}) expansion, designed for energy efficiency and environmental sustainability, was officially opened at the campus. The new building, designed by Craig Applegath of Dialog, features three 80-seat classrooms; twenty-three 40-seat classrooms; fourteen 40-seat computer labs; a multi-purpose auditorium for 240 students that can be turned into a conference room or two 120-seat lecture halls; increased computing commons and library space; several new areas of collaborative student study and work space; a new "front door" for the campus; and improved campus access for people with disabilities. The atrium in the new space was named after Frederick Minkler, Seneca's first chair of the board of governors.

In 2019, Seneca's Centre for Innovation, Technology and Entrepreneurship (CITE) opened at Newnham Campus. CITE includes Seneca's innovation centre known HELIX, technology labs for mechatronics and robotics courses, and computer labs and classrooms. CITE is infused with Indigenous design, the highlight of which is a 9.1 m (30 ft) diameter medallion in terrazzo rendered from an original work by Joseph Sagaj.

=== Seneca@York ===
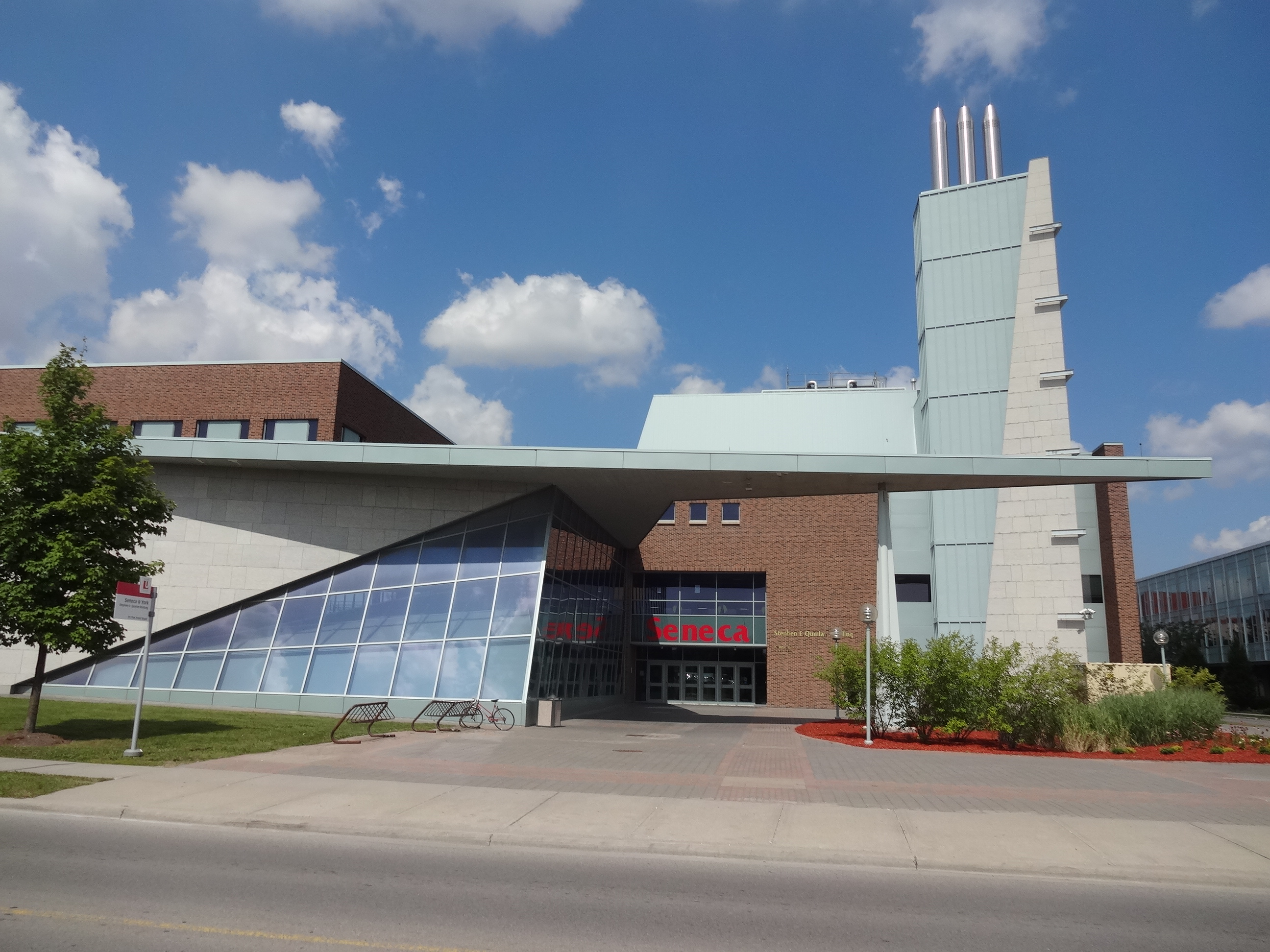
Seneca@York's Stephen E. Quinlan Building

Seneca@York Campus, located on York University's Keele Campus, includes the Stephen E. Quinlan Building, designed by architect Raymond Moriyama and named after Seneca's third president Steve Quinlan. Seneca also shares the Victor Phillip Dahdaleh Building (formerly known as TEL building) with York University. Several schools are located at this campus, including the Schools of Creative Arts and Animation, Media, Biological Sciences and Applied Chemistry, English and Liberal Studies, and Legal, Public and Office Administration.

=== King Campus ===
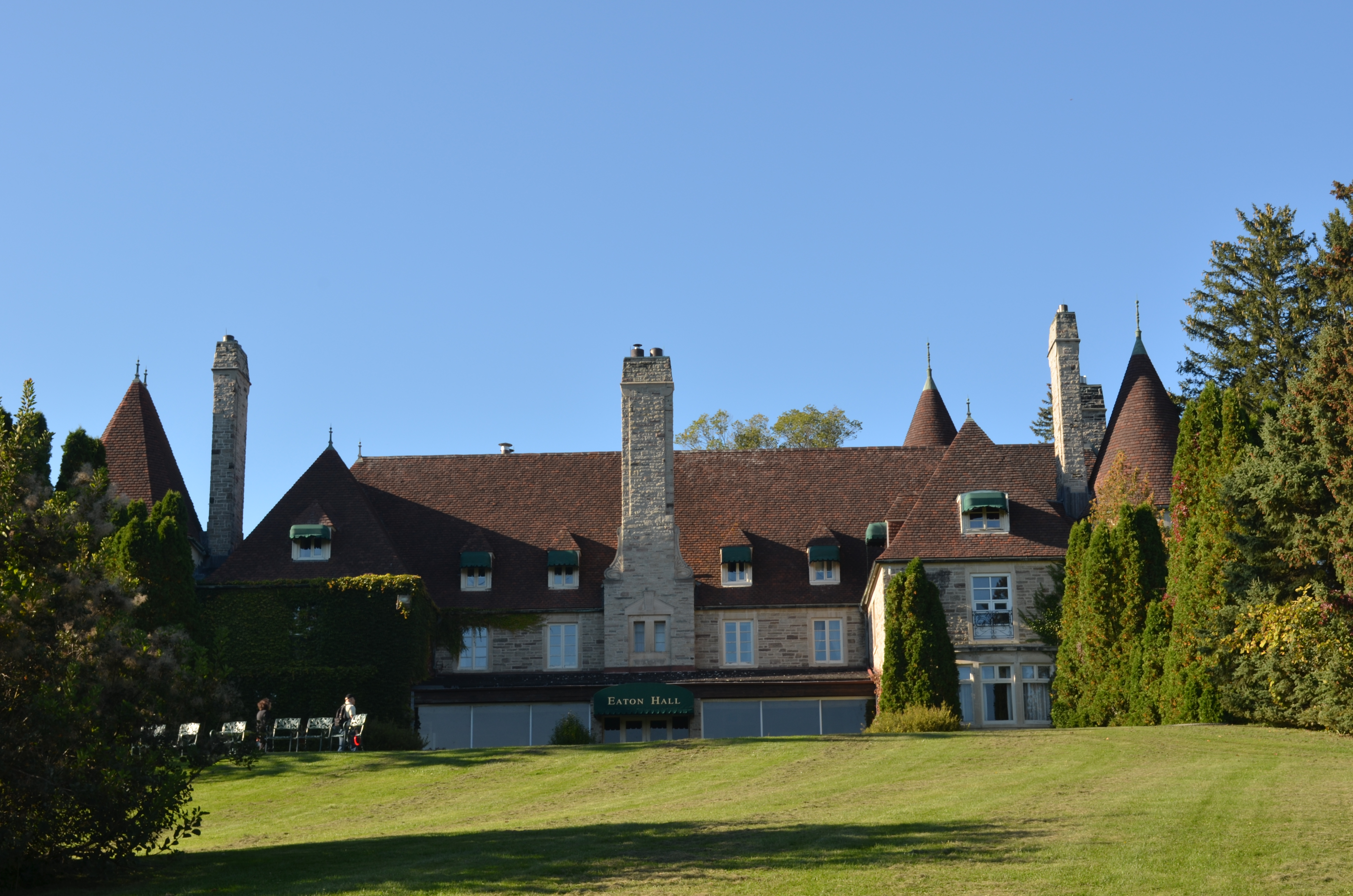
Seneca's Eaton Hall, located on the shores of Lake Seneca at King Campus

King Campus is located on 282 ha (700 acres) of woods, lake and fields in King City. It is home to full and part-time programs in Applied Arts, Health Sciences, and Community Services; which include Public Safety, Nursing, Social Service Worker, Child and Youth Care, Behavioural Sciences, Early Childhood Education, Environmental Landscape Management, Recreation and Leisure Services, Underwater Skills, and Veterinary Assistant and Veterinary Technician. There is a residence for Seneca students on campus. Seneca Residence is a suite-style building for about 230 students with a lounge, laundry room, and common kitchen.

Eaton Hall, the former summer home of the Eaton family, is on the shore of Lake Seneca. Eaton Hall is the former home of Seneca's Management Development Centre, and has also been the setting of several films, including David Cronenberg's A History of Violence, Richard Benjamin's Mrs. Winterbourne, and William Fruet's Death Weekend (The House by the Lake).

In June 2011, the Government of Ontario announced a $43 million project to expand services at the campus, including a new building with 25 classrooms, a library, computer services, and health care training laboratories. The project became Magna Hall, a 19,000 m^{2} (200,000 ft^{2}) facility that officially opened on 27 September 2018. Named in recognition of a significant gift from Magna International, it includes 25 classrooms, computer labs, specialty labs, a library, a student centre and a multi-purpose athletic and recreation space.

A 10 ha (25 acres) part of the campus at the northwest corner of Dufferin Street and 15th Sideroad will house a community centre for King City. The township of King will lease the land for $1 per year for 99 years.

=== Markham Campus ===
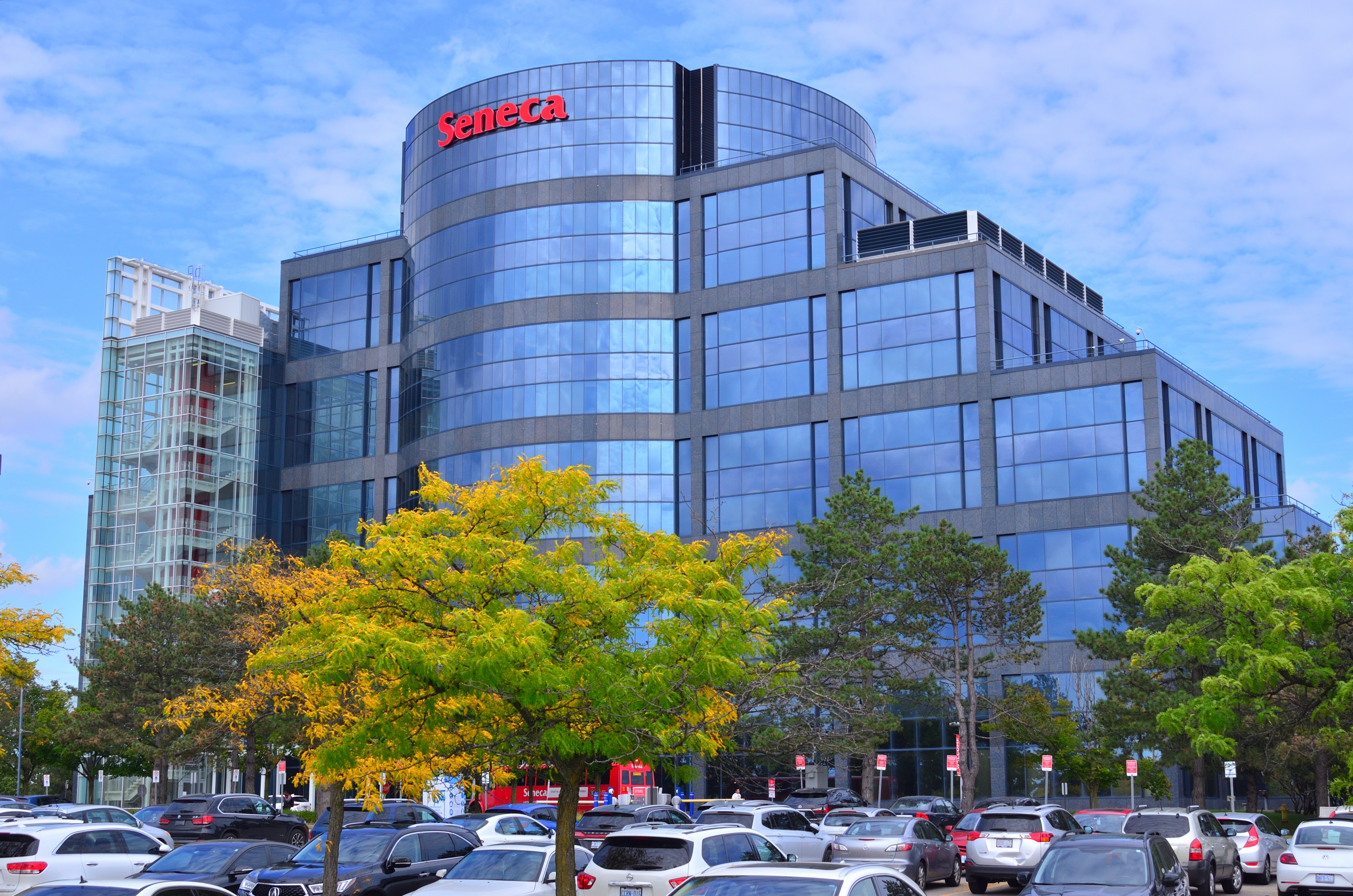
Seneca's Markham Campus

Markham Campus opened in 2005, becoming the first post-secondary education facility in the city of Markham. The campus houses full and part-time programs in the areas of business, marketing, and tourism, as well as the college's departments of Finance, Human Resources, and Information Technology Services. Since 2011, the campus has been home to the Confucius Institute.

In 2020, Seneca International Academy (SIA) was established within Markham Campus for international students. The academy offers dedicated services for international students.

In October 2024, a press release stated that Seneca Polytechnic would temporarily close the Markham campus at the end of 2024, transferring program resources to the Seneca@York or Newnham campuses.

=== Peterborough Campus ===
Peterborough Airport in Peterborough is the home of Seneca's aviation campus, including a fleet of aircraft and flight training devices used by students enrolled in the Bachelor of Aviation Program. Opened in January 2014, in response to the pending closure of Buttonville Airport, the campus serves the second, third and fourth years of the degree program, while first-year students study at Newnham Campus. Some courses and services at the Peterborough Campus are offered in partnership with Fleming College.

As of September 2025, Seneca's fleet consists of 19 aircraft: fifteen Cessna 172 (172S model, eight are Garmin G1000 equipped) and four Beechcraft Barons (Baron 58 model, two are G1000 equipped).

=== Seneca Downtown ===
Opened in October 2019 and located in downtown Toronto, Seneca Downtown provides in-class, online and hybrid courses for post-secondary graduates and working professionals. Seneca's Downtown campus has been permanently shut down, there were no media releases from Seneca officially.

=== Yorkgate Campus ===
Open since 1994, Yorkgate Campus serves as an access and outreach centre for the Jane-Finch community, Yorkgate also offers post-secondary programs including, since 2013, Practical Nursing and Social Service Worker. The facility is located on the second floor of the Yorkgate Mall at Finch Avenue West and Jane Street in Toronto. As of 2024, Seneca Yorkgate operations are indefinitely suspended, and programs have been moved to other campus locations.

== Former locations ==
Seneca's first homes from 1967 to 1969 were various buildings in North York:

- Sheppard Campus at 43 Sheppard Avenue East, a converted factory; the college vacated it for Newnham Campus, and the site is now a low-rise office tower.
- Several North York Board of Education offices
- A Woolworth store at Sheppard Avenue East and Yonge Street; the strip mall was demolished and is now the site of a condo development, Hullmark Centre.
- Lewis S. Beattie Secondary School (now École secondaire catholique Monseigneur-de-Charbonnel of the Conseil scolaire catholique MonAvenir) at Drewy Avenue west of Yonge Street

Other former Seneca Polytechnic campuses include:

- Jane Campus home to Seneca's Centre for Advanced Technologies. Students studying at the campus pursue careers in the areas of Tool Design, Computer Numerical Control (CNC), and Metals Machining Trades such as Tool & Die Maker and Mould Maker. The building is located at 21 Beverly Hills Drive in Toronto and can be seen from the westbound collector lanes of Highway 401. Seneca's Jane Campus closed in May 2019.
- Vaughan Campus officially opened its doors on 28 January 2011, at 1490 Major Mackenzie Drive West, in Vaughan. It offered services including academic upgrading, employment services and workplace essential skills training for professionals, as well as a centre for entrepreneurship. The campus closed in March 2020.
- Newmarket Campus offered Employment Ontario services and access to resources and information. Programs at this location included employment counselling, job search workshops, job development services, and computer skills training. Academic upgrading was offered in the day and evening. The campus was located in Nature's Emporium Plaza, 16655 Yonge St. in Newmarket.
- Yorkdale Campus on Dufferin Street, south of Lawrence Avenue West in North York, was home to the Travel and Tourism program from the 1980s to 2000. Formerly C.B. Parsons Junior High, it is now home to Fieldstone Day School. The building was owned by the North York Board of Education and is now owned by the Toronto District School Board.
- Markham Information Centre located at the northeast corner of McCowan Road and Highway 7. The office later relocated to 6061 Highway 7 east of Markham Road (Employment and Community Services).
- Buttonville Campus located at the Buttonville Municipal Airport housed Seneca's aviation program from 1968 to 2013. The aviation program later relocated to Peterborough Airport.
- Don Mills Campus located in a former IBM building at 1380 Don Mills Road in North York. Don Mills Campus opened in 1991 and housed the School of Computer Studies and Financial Services Department.
- Gordon Baker Campus located at 155 Gordon Baker Drive, Unit 102. Gordon Baker Campus opened in the early 1990s and was home to Seneca's real estate program. Computer training was also offered.
- Caledonia Campus located at 1200 Lawrence Avenue West in Toronto. Caledonia Campus opened in 1986 and offered English as a Second Language and summer language programs. Caledonia once housed Seneca's English Language Institute.
- Fairmeadow Campus located at 17 Fairmeadow Avenue in North York. Fairmeadow Campus housed many of Seneca's administrative functions including accounting, purchasing, personnel and media services. Fairmeadow was also home to Seneca's Suzuki School of Music which instructed students in the Suzuki Method from 1974 to 1991. Formerly Fairmeadow Public School from 1951 to 1981.
- School of Communication Arts located at 1124 Finch Avenue West in North York. The School of Communication Arts opened in the fall of 1987 and was dedicated entirely to creative and communication arts.
- Dufferin Campus located at 1000 Finch Avenue West in Downsview. Dufferin Campus opened on 8 September 1975 and was the headquarters of the Business and Industrial Training Division. The campus also housed facilities for the Dental Hygiene and Dental Assistant programs.

== Academics ==
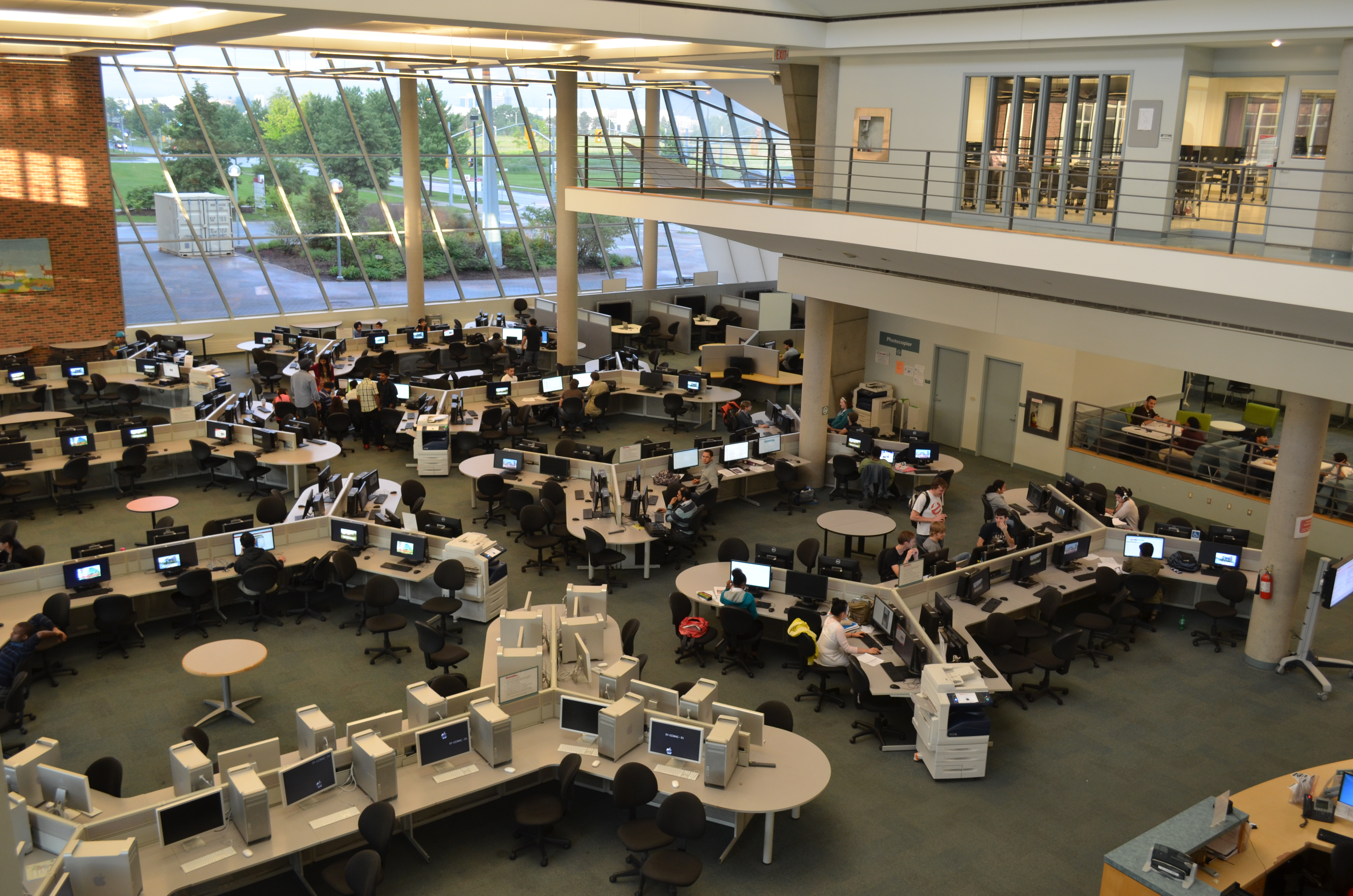
Seneca@York Library

Seneca offers more than 145 full-time programs and 135 part-time programs including 14 Bachelor's degrees and 30 graduate certificates. It provides 759 courses at Certificate, Diploma, Advanced Diploma, Bachelors, Post Graduate and Post Degree Certificate levels.

Many programs offer experiential learning opportunities such as co-op, placements, internships and community service options, and some include a mandatory co-op period prior to graduation. Seneca also offers career search assistance to graduating students. Seneca Polytechnic programs are developed and kept current with the assistance of advisory committees made up of industry members.

Seneca Polytechnic has more than 70 transfer agreements with both local and international post-secondary institutions, including universities in Australia, Ireland, the United Kingdom, and the United States. These agreements allow students to apply their college education to obtain credit towards a university degree.

=== Faculties, schools and centres ===
Community and Health

- Animal Health
- Community Services
- Early Childhood Education
- Health Sciences
- Public Safety and Police Studies
- Recreation

Applied Science & Engineering Technology

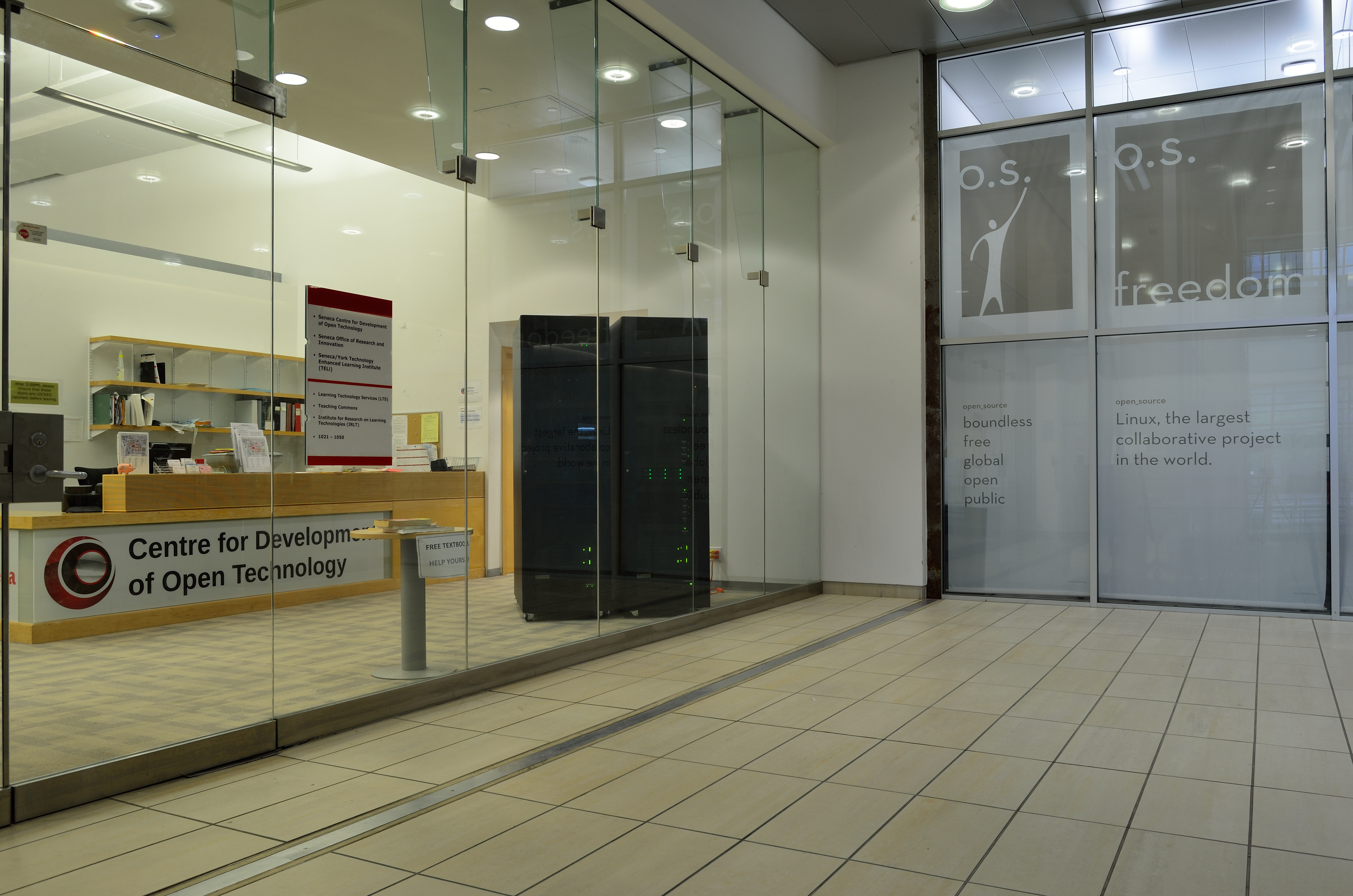
Centre for Development of Open Technology, School of Information and Communications Technology

- Aviation
- Biological Sciences & Applied Chemistry
- Centre for Advanced Technologies
- Centre for the Built Environment
- Information Technology Administration and Security
- English and Liberal Studies
- Fire Protection
- Software Design and Data Science

Business

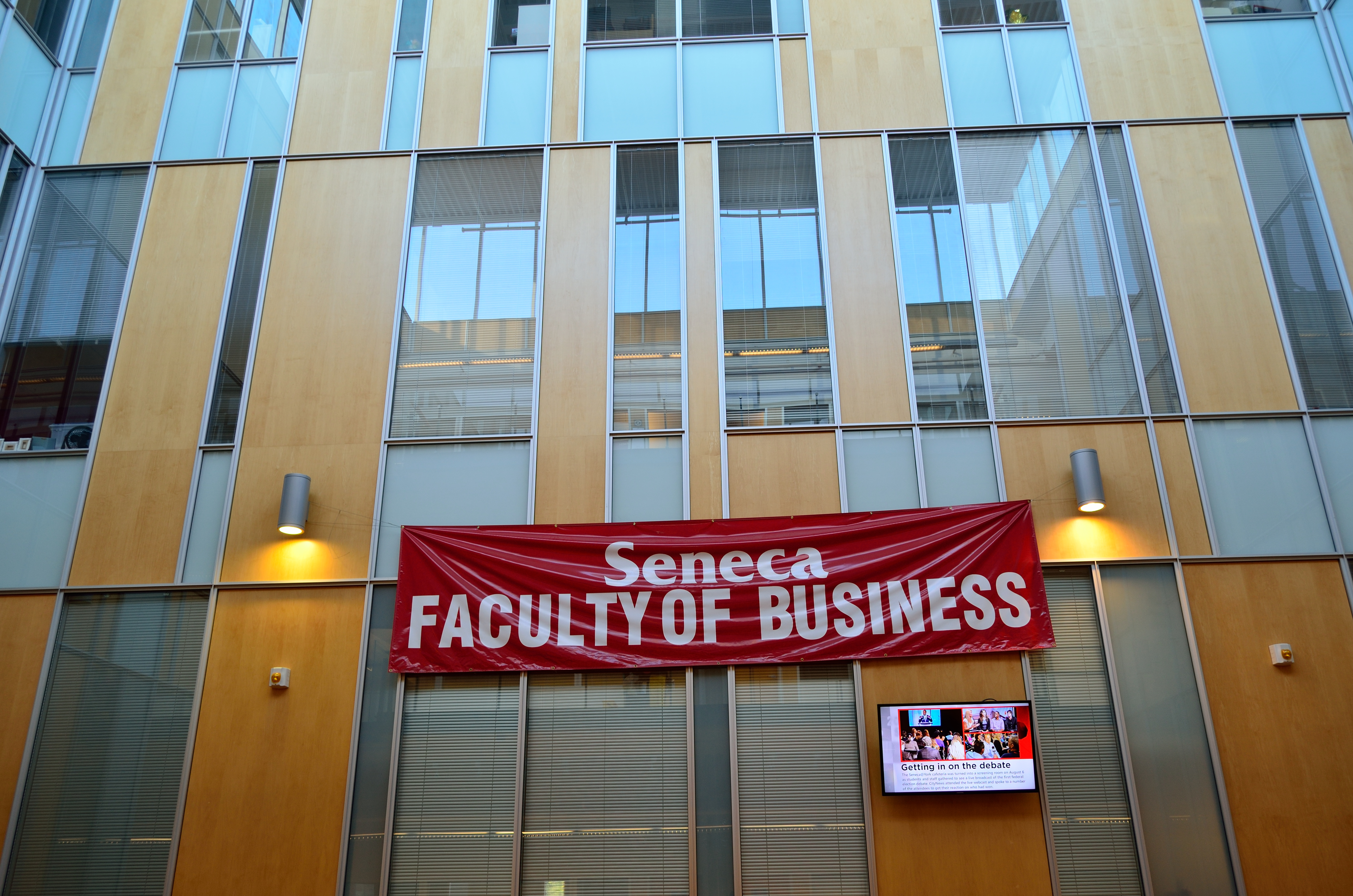
Faculty of Business on Newnham Campus

- Accounting & Financial Services
- Business Management
- Centre for Financial Services
- Centre for Human Resources
- English and Liberal Studies
- International Business
- Tourism

Communication, Art & Design

- Animation Arts Centre
- Creative Arts and Animation
- English and Liberal Studies
- Fashion
- Marketing
- Media
- Seneca Film Institute

Arts

- Arts and Science
- English Language Institute
- English and Liberal Studies

Nursing

Continuing Education

- Business
- Community
- Creative
- Education
- Environment
- Humanities
- Language
- Technology

=== Seneca Libraries ===
Seneca libraries offer print, audiovisual and electronic resources including books, magazines, journals, videos, DVDs, slides, recordings and a variety of topical databases. A high percentage of the collection is now digital. Services include research support, library instruction and a large circulating collection. The libraries provide online help through e-mail and the live reference chat services, "AskUS" and "askON". The Seneca Libraries' website also hosts research guides tailored to program-specific offerings. The library facilities are located at the Newnham, York University, Markham and King campuses and offer facilities for group and individual study and electronic training centres, the Sandbox, and workstations equipped with instructional software and information resources tailored to course requirements.

=== Seneca Archives and Special Collections ===
Seneca Archives and Special Collections identifies, preserves, and makes available for use the documentary heritage of Seneca Polytechnic. The service collects inactive records of long-term value produced by Seneca's departments and other services, as well as the records of individuals and organizations closely associated with the college. Seneca Archives and Special Collections holdings consist of textual records, graphic records, sound and moving image records, architectural drawings, publications, artifacts, and more. The Archives' resources are open to all members of the College community and outside researchers for the purposes of research, teaching, publication, television and radio programs, and for general interest.

== International ==
Seneca has been active in international education for decades and now attracts about 10,000 international students each year from about 130 countries. Seneca's English Language Institute prepares international students for post-secondary study through intensive language training that can last anywhere from two months to more than a year. The college has several partnerships with overseas institutions and is expanding its activities in joint applied research and work / study abroad options.

Ethical problems with Canadian college's international student enrolment has become an issue which has resulted in 23 of 24 Ontario colleges implementing standards of practice to protect international students because most of them had entered into partnerships with for-profit private colleges. Seneca did not. Seneca Polytechnic has not implemented these standards.

== Residence ==
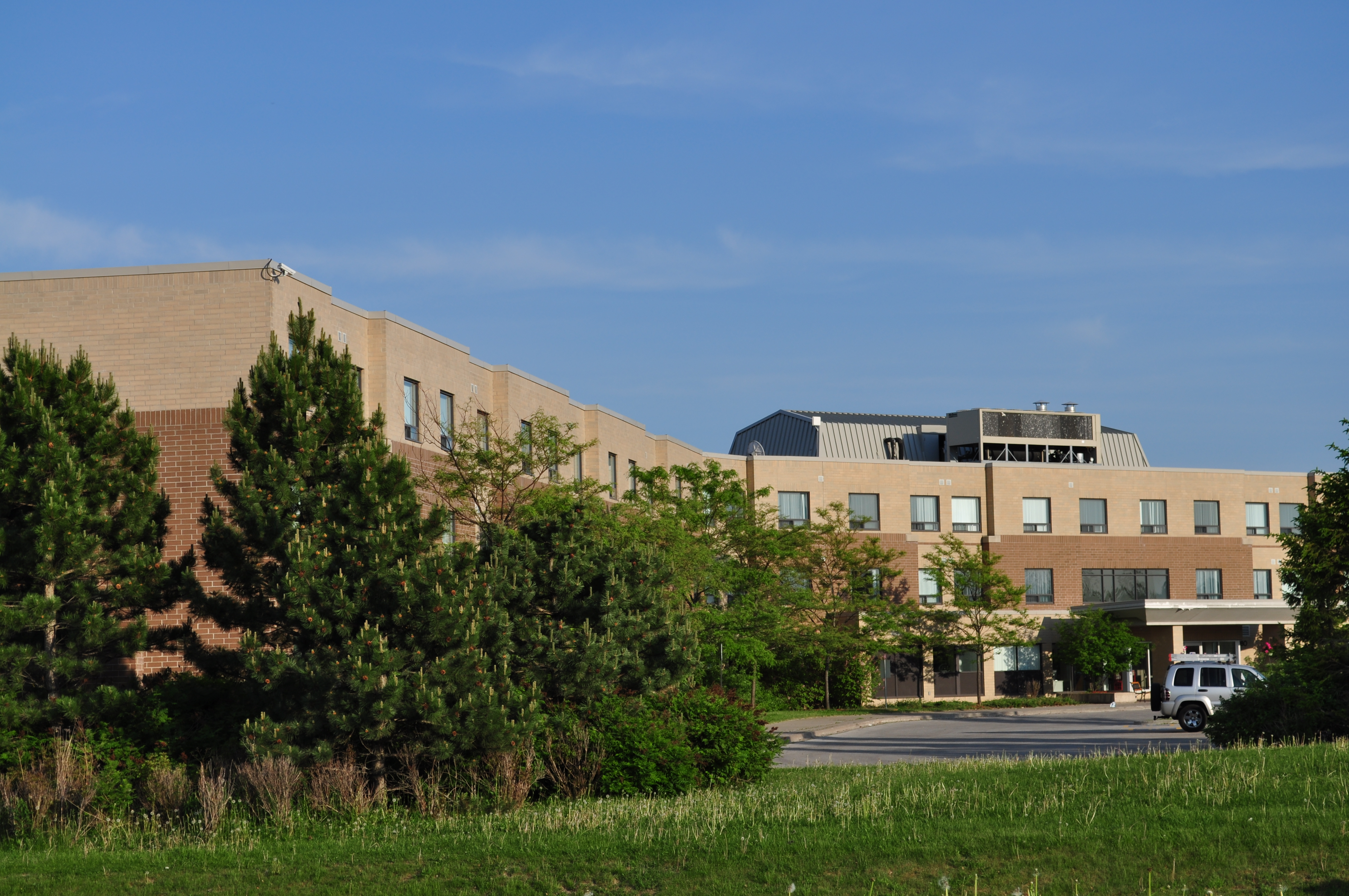
King Campus Student Residence

Seneca Polytechnic currently offers residence at both the Newnham Campus and the King Campus. Seneca residences are composed of suite-style units containing two bedrooms, a bathroom and kitchenette. Each bedroom contains a double bed, desk, chair, closet and dresser space, as well as cable TV, internet access and phone. Students also have access to a common kitchen, laundry rooms, lounge areas, a games room and a convenience store. Buildings have a front desk and 24-hour video monitoring, and are accessed by swipe card. The King Campus residence houses 233 students in a three-storey low-rise structure, while the Newnham Campus residence houses 1,113 students in a high-rise tower with a dining hall, convenience store, and restaurant all within the building. Seneca Polytechnic Residence have organized a free shuttle service from the Newnham Campus to the Markham, Seneca@York and King campuses.

== Athletics ==
The school's athletic teams are named "The Sting". The Seneca Sting is one of the most-decorated athletic programs in the history of the Ontario Colleges Athletic Association (OCAA), having won more than 450 medals since 1967. Seneca has eighteen varsity sports teams for men and women, including badminton, baseball, basketball, cross country running, dance, rugby, soccer (indoor and outdoor), softball, and volleyball. The Seneca Sports Centre located at the Newnham Campus includes a full ice arena, a triple gymnasium, six tennis courts, a softball diamond, two beach volleyball courts, a soccer field, and a fitness centre with a dance studio. Seneca Polytechnic also offers various fields, gymnasiums and fitness equipment at other campuses.

== Concerts ==
Seneca hosted a number of concerts in the 1970s and 1980s at the Minkler Auditorium and Seneca Field House (both at Newnham Campus). Monty Python's Flying Circus performed at the Minkler Auditorium on their first Canadian tour in 1973. The Grateful Dead performed at Seneca Polytechnic's Field House on 2 November 1977. Other famous artists who performed in the late seventies and eighties at Seneca include Patti Smith, Bruce Springsteen (in one of his first Canadian appearances), David Bowie, Thin Lizzy (1977), Graham Parker, Sparks, Teenage Head, Max Webster (1977), Blondie, and Iggy Pop.

== Notable people ==
=== Alumni ===
- Enza Anderson – political activist and media personality
- Bobby Ash – children's TV host
- Mathis Bailey — novelist and writer
- Lyriq Bent – actor
- Rachel Bonnetta – Canadian sports presenter
- Boris Cherniak – entertainer
- Al Connelly – musician
- Alvin Curling – Canadian former diplomat and former Liberal MPP
- Dini Dimakos – stand-up comedian
- Nerys Dockery – Ambassador from Saint Kitts and Nevis
- Dan Harris – politician
- Geraldine Heaney – hockey player and coach
- Angela James – hockey player; one of the first two women inducted into the Hockey Hall of Fame
- Chuck (Spider) Jones – broadcaster
- Rukhsana Khan – author, writer, storyteller
- Wiz Kilo – hip-hop artist
- P.J. Marcellino – documentary filmmaker
- Vivienne Poy – fashion designer and Canadian senator
- Brian Price – Canadian Olympic rowing team
- Nathan Lloyd Smith – soldier killed in the Tarnak Farm incident
- Hodan Nalayeh – media executive and entrepreneur
- Evanka Osmak – sports anchor
- Beverly Thomson – host of Canada AM
- Yasmin Warsame – model
- Jason Chan – Hong Kong pop singer, entertainer
- Bill Welychka – former MuchMusic and MuchMoreMusic personality, now weather anchor
- Skye Chan - former TVB actress and 1st runner up of Miss Hong Kong 2008

=== Faculty ===
- Nebojša Čonkić – rock musician and professor
- Nanda Lwin – music historian, author, journalist, and professor of civil engineering technology
- Paula Todd – journalist, author, and professor of broadcast journalism and digital media
- Jamie Zeppa – writer
- Hershell Ezrin – public affairs specialist

=== Presidents ===
- William Thomson Newnham 1966–1984
- W. Roy McCutcheon 1984–1992
- Steve Quinlan 1992–2001
- Rick Miner 2001–2009
- David Agnew 2009–present

== See also ==
- Higher education in Ontario
- List of colleges in Ontario
- The Spine, a computer-animated short by Chris Landreth created with Seneca College animators
