= Don Mills Collegiate Institute =

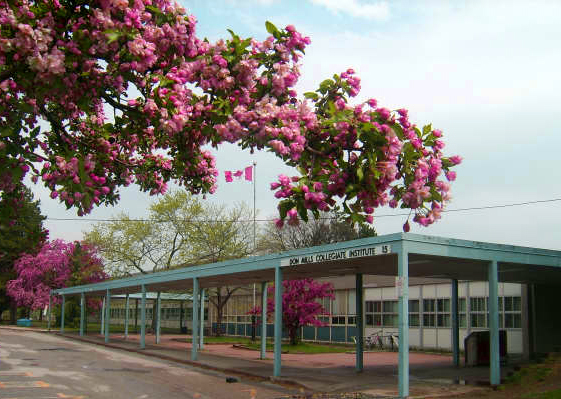

Location
- 15 The Donway East; Toronto, Ontario, M3C 1X6; Canada; 43°44′09.16″N 79°20′21.04″W

Information
- School type: Public, high school
- Motto: Omnia per scientiam (All things through knowledge)
- Founded: 1959
- School board: Toronto District School Board
- Superintendent: Nadira Persaud
- Area trustee: Farzana Rajwani
- Principal: Arnold Witt
- Grades: 9-12
- Enrolment: 1,055 (2017)
- Language: English, ESL Support
- Schedule type: Semestered
- Colours: Black, Gold, and White
- Team name: Bruins
- Newspaper: The Bulldog
- Website: schoolweb.tdsb.on.ca/donmillsci/
- Last updated: April 17, 2025

Don Mills Collegiate Institute is a high school in Toronto, Ontario, Canada. Located in the Don Mills neighbourhood, it serves an ethnically diverse student population of approximately 1000. As of 2017, 67% of students speak a first language other than English. The school opened in 1959.

== Location ==
Initially, the board planned to build two separate schools on the site with a shared heating plant, but in October 1957, trustee Dorothy Bishop prepared a report which raised the possibility of saving money by placing the two schools under one roof, as had previously been done in Vancouver and Calgary.

DMCI shares its building with Don Mills Middle School (formerly Don Mills Junior High); however, the two schools have different street addresses and the buildings are designed in a way that keeps the two schools separated except for a common library and connecting hallways. The auditorium located within the collegiate building is also occasionally used by Don Mills Middle School. Additionally, a number of rooms in the middle school are used to teach high school students, possibly due to the lack of available space in the collegiate half of the building.

== Special programs ==
=== Gifted ===
Don Mills Collegiate has a gifted program for students. The program was moved to DMCI in 1997 from Earl Haig Secondary School and has increased the number of students in the school.

=== Cyberarts ===
The school also houses CyberARTS, a multi-disciplinary arts and technology program. It also offers computer technology and communications technology courses, as well as a comprehensive technological design (shop) program.

ESL classes are available to assist international students.

== Competitions and extracurriculars ==
Don Mills has been consistently represented in the International Math Olympiad, International Physics Olympiad, and the DECA International Career Development Conference. In addition, the school has also performed well in chemistry competitions, including the University of Waterloo's Avogadro and Chem 13 competitions, as well as the Canadian Chemistry Olympiad.

=== The Bulldog ===
DMCI's student-run newspaper, The Bulldog, is one of the few weekly high school publications in Ontario, and has been honoured at the Toronto Star High School Newspaper Awards.

=== Reach for the Top ===
DMCI's Reach for the Top team placed seventh at the Ontario Provincials in the 2010–2011 season, their best achievement in the competition.

=== YPS ===
In 1998, DMCI was asked by the Toronto District School Board to represent Canada at the inaugural Young People's Summit (YPS), held in conjunction with the annual meeting of G8 countries in Birmingham, England.

=== Northern Lights ===
Don Mills is also home of the award-winning Northern Lights Show Choir. Northern Lights is Ontario's longest-running high school show choir. This group performs throughout the community and attends performances and competitions in the US and Canada.

=== DECA ===
DECA is a leadership building international business competition with over 200,000 members internationally.

== Notable facts and controversies ==
The school's logo.

- In October 1969, school administrators suspended 19 football players for drinking beer on a bus ride back from a game. The school pulled the team from the league for the remainder of the season.
- A 25-year-old English teacher at DMCI was suspended in 1971 after police seized 16 marijuana plants from the garden at his home.
- Sue Johanson, from the Sunday Night Sex Show, opened the area's first high school-based birth control clinic at DMCI in November 1972. Called the Don Mills Birth Control Clinic, it used the school's health room every Monday night (expanded to two nights a week in 1980). The school principal said DMCI was "completely uninvolved" with the clinic, except for providing space.
- In March 1981, the school allowed the Canadian executive director of the Ku Klux Klan to speak to a Grade 12 history class. The principal later said it would never happen again.
- In October 2008, DMCI was placed under lockdown for about four hours after police received a call about a possible stabbing. Police arrived to find a grade 9 student going into shock from stab wounds to the abdomen. A 17-year-old boy was arrested and taken into custody about half an hour later. The victim was taken to Sunnybrook Hospital and survived.

== See also ==
- Education in Ontario
- List of secondary schools in Ontario
