= Algonquin College =

College in Ottawa, Ontario, Canada

Algonquin College of Applied Arts and Technology
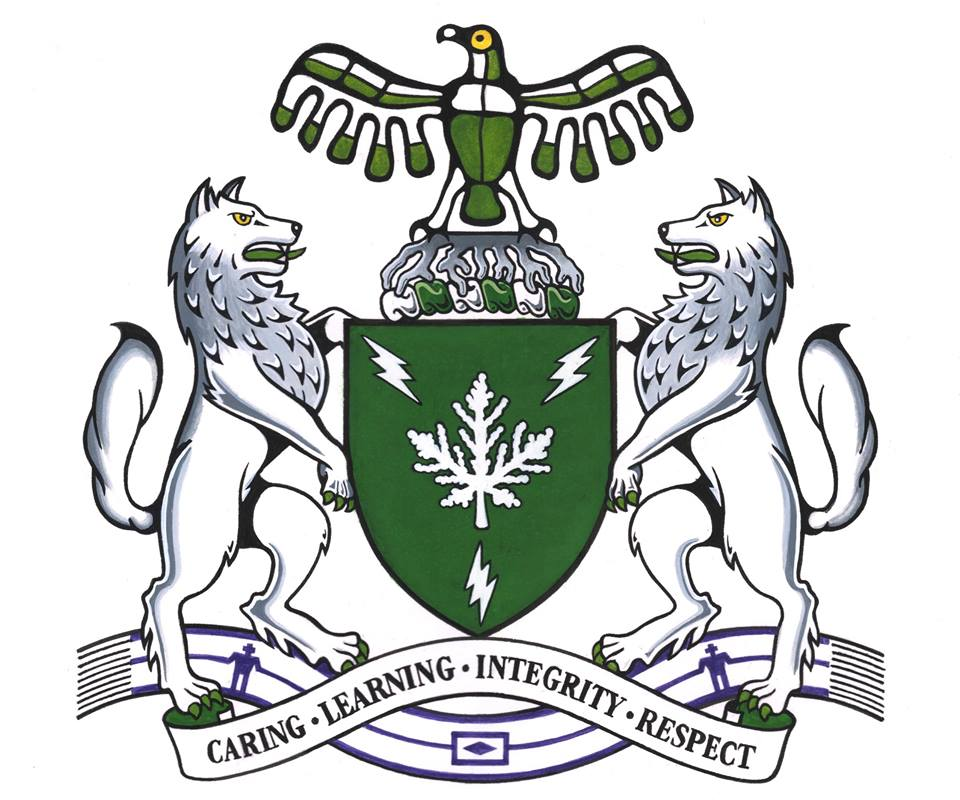
- Coat of arms of the college
- Motto: To transform hopes and dreams into lifelong success
- Type: Public
- Established: 1967; 59 years ago
- Affiliations: CICan, CCAA, ACCC, AUCC, CBIE, Polytechnics Canada
- President: Claude Brulé
- Administrative staff: 1,151 full time
- Students: 19,000 full-time; 37,000 part-time (2025: 18,953 FTEs)
- Location: 1385 Woodroffe Avenue; Ottawa, Ontario; K2G 1V8; 45°20′48.97″N 75°45′33.79″W
- Campus: Urban
- Colours: Green and white
- Nickname: Algonquin Wolves
- Mascot: Wolf
- Website: algonquincollege.com

Algonquin College of Applied Arts and Technology is a publicly funded English-language polytechnic located in Ottawa, Ontario, Canada. The college has three campuses, all in Ontario: a primary campus in Ottawa, and a secondary campus in Pembroke. It offers bachelor's degrees, diplomas, graduate certificates, and certificates. The college serves the National Capital Region and the outlying areas of Eastern Ontario and Western Quebec. It has been ranked among the Top 50 Research Colleges in Canada and has been recognized as one of Canada's top innovation leaders. The enabling legislation is the Ministry of Training, Colleges and Universities Act. It is a member of Colleges and Institutes Canada (CICan) and Polytechnics Canada.

== History ==
The college was established during the formation of Ontario's college system in 1967. Colleges of Applied Arts and Technology were established on May 21, 1965, when the Ontario system of public colleges was created. The founding institutions were the Eastern Ontario Institute of Technology (established in 1957) and the Ontario Vocational Centre Ottawa (established in 1965 at the Woodroffe Campus and known as OVC). The original 8-acre (3.2 ha) site on Woodroffe Avenue was donated to the city by Mr and Mrs Frank Ryan.

The Ottawa architecture firm of Burgess, McLean & MacPhadyen designed the midcentury academic complex with open-ended blocks alternatively faced with long glass expanses in a semi-gambrel formation that make up the curtain walls and precast aggregate panels. The corporate campus or modernist academic acropolis spread across North America in the early 1960s.

The first Principal of the Ontario Vocational Centre (OVC) was Kenneth G. Shoultz. Shoultz took on the leadership of OVC in 1965 after working as a technical studies teacher and then as an inspector for the Ontario Department of Education. He continued on as the first Dean of the Technical Centre after OVC was amalgamated with Algonquin College in 1967.

The college is named after the Algonquin people who were the original inhabitants of the area.

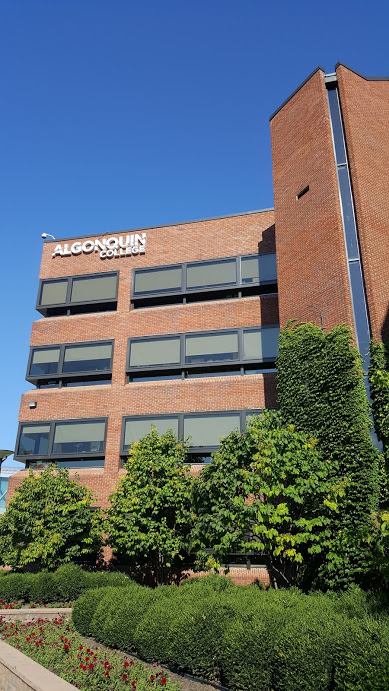
B Building

In 1964, the Rideau Campus was established. "Satellite" campuses in Pembroke, Hawkesbury, Perth, Carleton Place and Renfrew were established in the late 1960s. The Vanier School of Nursing became a part of the Woodroffe Campus when nursing programs began to be offered at the college. In 1973, the School of Prescott-Russell joined the Algonquin family and the Colonel By Campus was created through the acquisition of St. Patrick's College. With the creation of La Cité Collégiale, 1990 marked the beginning of Algonquin as an English-only college. The Hawkesbury campus was transferred to La Cité Collégiale, and the Renfrew, Colonel By, Carleton Place, and Rideau campuses were progressively closed between 1990 and 2002.

In 2025, the college announced plans to permanently close the Perth campus and 41 programs by August 2026, citing significant projected budget deficits. In 2026, a further 30 programs were set for elimination.

== Programs ==
Algonquin has 170 programs, focused on health care, skilled trades, business, hospitality, arts and technology. Algonquin College offers apprenticeship programs, co-op programs, collaborative degree programs and bachelor's degree programs. Some of these degrees are through direct collaborative partnerships with Carleton University.

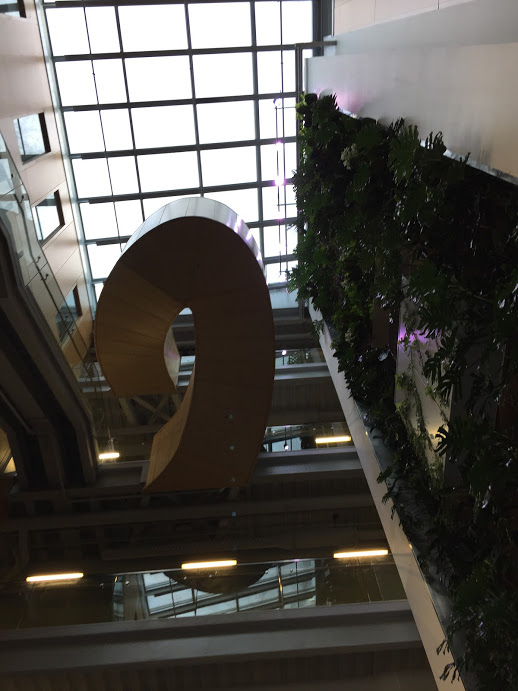
Floating staircase in ACCE building

The college's Woodroffe Campus boasts a fully functional (though non-broadcast) television studio with an adjoining control room, for students of the Broadcasting-Television program. Notable graduates from this program include director of the TV series 24, Jon Cassar and comedian Tom Green. The college used to have a second television studio, which now houses the Theatre Arts program.

The Animation program is a three-year advanced diploma with its main focus on performance-based animation whether it be in 3D or traditional animation. Also, all students learn Toonboom's Harmony software. The program is celebrating its 20-year anniversary in 2009-10 and has its curriculum being taught in India, China and South Africa with negotiations with Dubai, Chile and others.

The Public Relations program is a two-year diploma in which students have raised notable amounts of money for local not-for-profit organizations including the John Howard Society, LiveWorkPlay, and Harmony House Women's Shelter. Since 1990, the Public Relations program has raised over $300,000 for charity.

The Pembroke Campus is well known for its outdoor training programs which attracts students from across Canada. These programs include Outdoor Adventure, Outdoor Adventure Naturalist and Forestry Technician. In 2012, a new Waterfront Campus opened in downtown Pembroke.

== Campuse Layout ==
=== Ottawa Campus ===
The Ottawa Campus is the main campus of Algonquin College, located on Woodroffe Avenue in Ottawa, Ontario. Its development expanded significantly from the 1960s onward, alongside the growth of the college's enrolment and academic programs.

The campus accommodates programs and facilities in fields including health sciences, construction, technology, hospitality, media, transportation and public safety. Major developments included the Advanced Technology Centre, which opened in 2002; the Animal Health Care Facility, opened in 2007; the Algonquin Centre for Construction Excellence, officially opened in 2011; and the Robert C. Gillett Student Commons, added in 2012.

The DARE District, which contains library and learning spaces, opened in 2018. The Jack Doyle Athletics and Recreation Centre was another major campus development, opening in 2021.

Buildings on the Ottawa Campus are identified primarily by letters.

=== Pembroke Campus ===
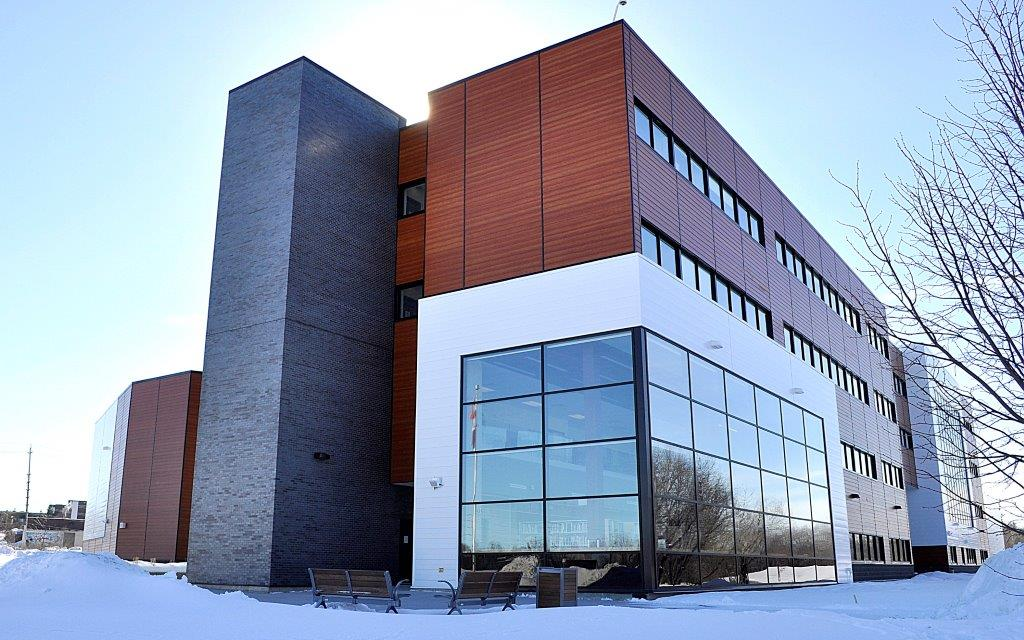
Algonquin College's Waterfront Campus in Pembroke, Ontario

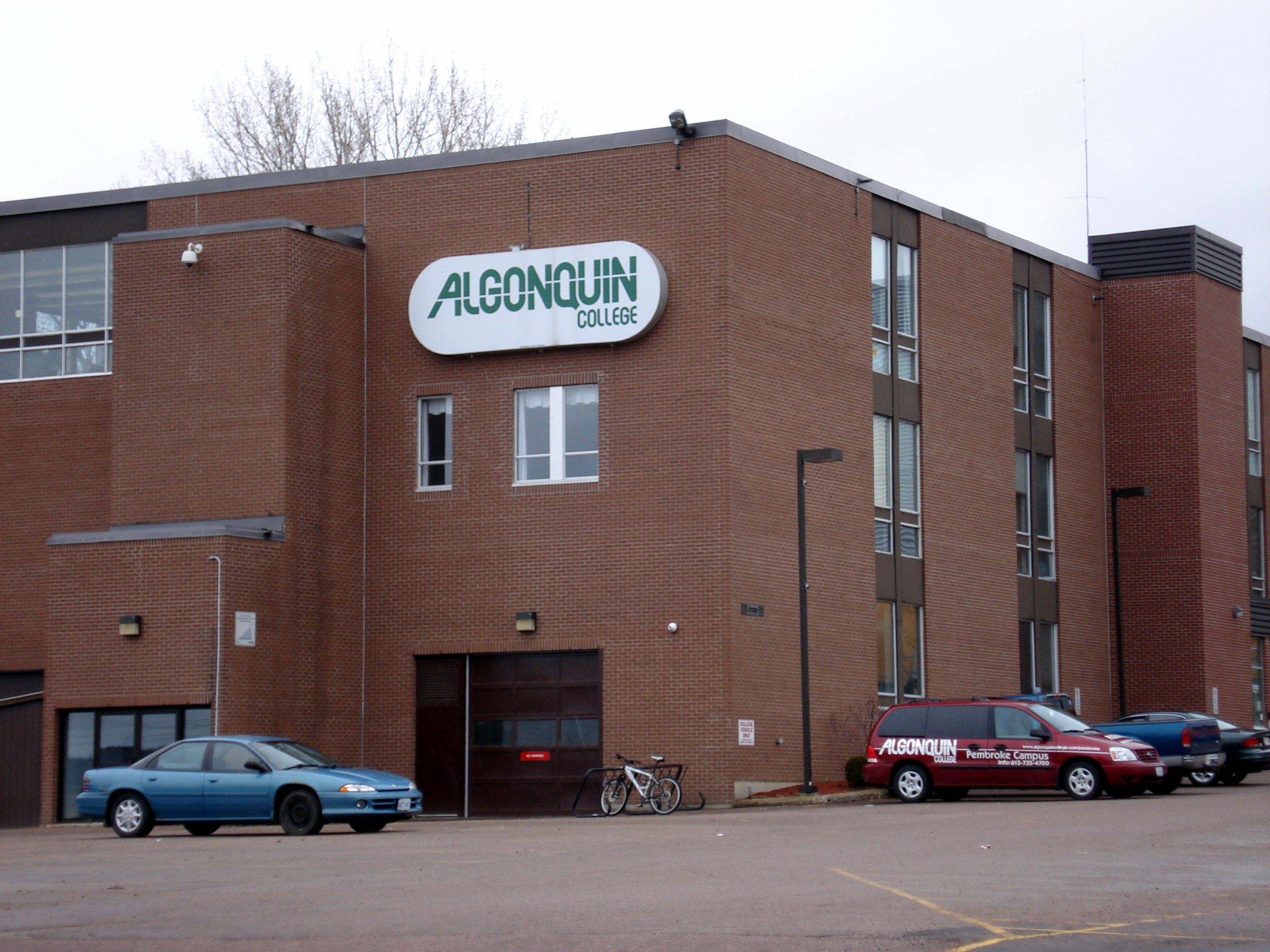
Algonquin College's Pembroke Campus

Algonquin College's Pembroke Campus was established in 1967 to serve students in the Ottawa Valley. Its first classes were held at the former Champlain High School, where 16 students enrolled in evening courses. Full-time programs began in September 1968, including business administration, general technology and architectural drawing.

The campus subsequently operated from a former dairy building on Pembroke Street. Its program offerings expanded to include forestry training in 1969 and an Outdoor Adventure program in 2000. In 2004, the campus began offering a collaborative Bachelor of Science in Nursing program with the University of Ottawa.

The current waterfront campus, known as Renaissance Square, opened in October 2012. The $36-million development replaced the former Pembroke Street location and provided updated facilities for instruction and student activities.

The campus has offered programs in areas including health sciences, business, technology, skilled trades, forestry and outdoor education.

=== Perth Campus ===
Algonquin College established its Perth Campus in the late 1960s as part of its expansion into communities in eastern Ontario. Classes were initially held in rented space at Perth and District Collegiate Institute. Construction of a permanent campus building at 7 Craig Street began in 1969.

The campus provided academic upgrading and employment-related training. Its program offerings expanded to include stenography, electronics, welding and carpentry, followed by additional vocational and trades programs, including Heritage Carpentry and Joinery.

On 24 February 2025, Algonquin College's Board of Governors approved a plan to withdraw from the Perth Campus by the end of August 2026, citing financial pressures and declining enrolment. The proposed transition included transferring the remaining Practical Nursing, Heritage Carpentry and Joinery, and Business – Agriculture programs to the Ottawa Campus. The Perth campus formally closed on August 31, 2026 and the building and its surrounding land was listed for private sale.

== International partnerships ==
Algonquin College has four international offshore partnerships:

- Manav Rachna International University (MRIU) – Faridabad, India
- Algonquin College (Orient Education Services Co) – Al-Naseem, Jahra, Kuwait
- Hotelski Educativni Centar (HEC) in Montenegro
- Jiangsu Maritime Institute (JMI) in Nanjing, China

From 2013 to 2017, the college operated a campus in Jazan, Saudi Arabia, but sold it after facing financial losses and criticism over the quality of education.

== College presidents ==
Date	Name
1967–1969	Frederick Rosser
1969–1973	Gerald Maher
1973–1982	Laurent Isabelle
1982–1984	Brian Ash
1984–1995	Philip Killeen
1996–2012	Robert Gillett
2012–2014	Kent MacDonald
2014–2019	Cheryl Jensen
2019–present	Claude Brulé

== Partnerships ==
Algonquin has formed strategic partnerships with select universities to offer collaborative degrees. This includes the Bachelor of Information Technology - Interactive Multimedia and Design with Carleton University; Bachelor of Information Technology - Network Technology with Carleton University. Studies take place at Algonquin College and the partnering university and collaborative degrees are conferred by the university. Algonquin has developed articulation agreements with universities to assist qualified Algonquin graduates to attain specific degrees in shorter periods. Graduates are subject to the admission requirements of the university granting the degree.

On February 16, 2017, Algonquin College announced a new partnership with The Ottawa Hospital in health research, innovation and training. The partnership, signed by Algonquin College President Cheryl Jensen and Executive Vice-president of Research at The Ottawa Hospital will be focused on digital health, clinical trials and biotherapeutics manufacturing. The partnership will stand for five years until requiring renewal.

Internationally, the college has several partnerships with institutions in other countries to transfer expertise through technical assistance and training programs.

=== Scholarships ===
Algonquin College joined Project Hero, a scholarship program co founded by General (Ret'd) Rick Hillier for the families of fallen Canadian Forces members.

Algonquin College bursaries for Aboriginal, First Nations and Métis students include: Peter Wintonick Bursary; Ottawa Police Service's Thomas G. Flanagan Scholarship; MKI Travel and Hospitality Bursary.

=== Military ===
The Diploma in Military Arts and Sciences (DMASc) provides Non-Commissioned Members (NCMs) of the Canadian Forces an online program made possible by a partnership between OntarioLearn (Algonquin College consortium member), the RMC, and the Canadian Defence Academy. Under a RMC and Algonquin College articulation agreement, all graduates of this diploma program who apply to the RMC will be admitted into the Bachelor of Military Arts and Sciences degree program with advanced standing.

In 2006, Algonquin College was approached by the Canadian Forces Support Training Group (CFSTG) to explore the feasibility of developing and delivering a program to satisfy the training requirements exclusively for Canadian Forces Geomatics Technicians. The goal was to increase the number of CF graduates produced by the School of Military Mapping. Students in the Geomatics Technician program earn a college-approved certificate in Geomatics. Algonquin also grants a provincially approved Geomatics Technician Diploma to students who successfully graduate from the Geomatics Technician Training and have completed a small number of approved additional courses.

== Athletics ==
Algonquin is a member of the OCAA and CCAA. It fields men's and women's varsity teams in basketball, volleyball and soccer. The team name is the Algonquin Wolves (renamed from Algonquin Thunder in 2021) and the school colours are green, black and white.

== Student publications ==
The student newspaper of Algonquin College is the Algonquin Times, founded in 1986. The paper is written by students in the journalism and advertising programs and funded by the Students Association. There is also a special-interest-focused magazine called Glue. The former was printed fortnightly, and the latter semiannually, before both became digital-only publications in 2022.

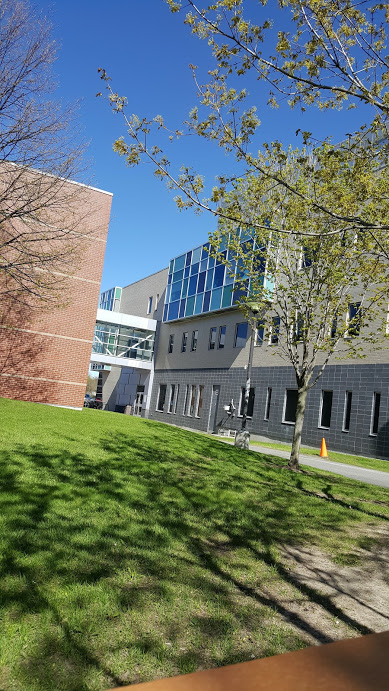
T Building

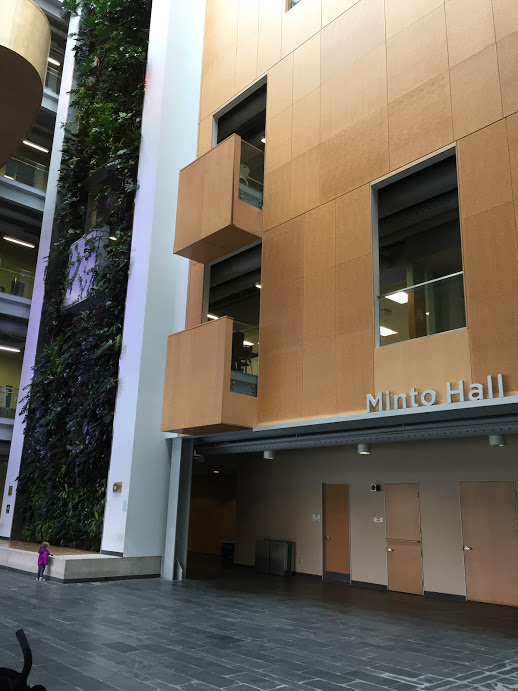
Minto Hall- ACCE Building Foyer

== Notable alumni and faculty ==
- Abdiweli Sheikh Ahmed, former Prime Minister of Somalia
- Germaine Arnaktauyok, Inuk printmaker, painter, and drawer
- Michael Barrett, Member of Parliament for Leeds—Grenville—Thousand Islands and Rideau Lakes
- Jason Blaine, country musician
- Jon Cassar, Emmy-winning producer and director of the TV series 24
- Zdeno Chára, former NHL player
- Frank Cole, documentary filmmaker
- James Cybulski, TSN reporter
- Janice Dean, Fox News weather specialist
- Ben Delaney, sledge hockey player
- Jon Dore, comedian
- Jamie Fine, Singer-songwriter
- François Gagnon, ice hockey journalist and television commentator
- Tom Green, comedian
- Collinda Joseph, wheelchair curler
- Ricardo Larrivée, television host and food writer
- Chris Lovasz, internet personality and member of The Yogscast
- Massari, singer
- Neil Macdonald, CBC Washington Bureau Chief
- Norm Macdonald, comedian
- Ian Millar, Olympic medal-winning equestrian
- Larry O'Brien, former mayor of Ottawa and technology entrepreneur
- Dan O'Toole, SportsCentre anchor, former Fox Sports Live anchor
- Anthony Rota, Member of Parliament for Nipissing—Timiskaming, former Speaker of the House of Commons
- Graham Sucha, Member of the Alberta Legislative Assembly for Calgary Shaw
- Katie Tallo, filmmaker and author
- Sally Thomas, Paralympic powerlifter
- Tim Tierney, City of Ottawa Councillor for Beacon Hill-Cyrville

== See also ==
- Higher education in Ontario
- List of colleges in Ontario
