= Polytechnics Canada =

Nonprofit association

- Formation: 2003; 23 years ago
- Type: Non-profit
- Legal status: active
- Purpose: advocate and public voice, educator and network
- Headquarters: Ottawa, Ontario, Canada
- Region served: Canada
- Members: 13
- Official language: English
- Chief Executive Officer: Sarah Watts-Rynard
- Website: polytechnicscanada.ca

Polytechnics Canada is a national nonprofit association representing 13 research-intensive, publicly funded polytechnics, colleges, and institutes of technology in Canada.

In 2022-23, the association's 13 members served over 402,600 for-credit students, with 100% of polytechnic programs built around an experiential component or model.

Polytechnics Canada’s members are providers of applied research. In 2023-24, they conducted 5,609 applied research projects, serving 3,051 partners and engaging 28,522 students.

== History ==
Polytechnics Canada was established in 2003 by eight Canadian colleges, polytechnics, and institutes of technology. The original founding members are BCIT, Conestoga College, George Brown College, Humber Polytechnic, NAIT, SAIT, Seneca Polytechnic and Sheridan. In recent years, Red River College Polytechnic, Saskatchewan Polytechnic, Kwantlen Polytechnic University, Algonquin College and Fanshawe College have joined as members.

== Members ==
Institution	City	Province	Total students	Established
Algonquin College	Ottawa	Ontario	20,000 full-time; 26,000+ part-time	1967
British Columbia Institute of Technology	Burnaby	British Columbia	18,000+ full-time; 30,000+ part-time	1964
Conestoga College	Kitchener	Ontario	20,000 full-time; 30,000 part-time	1967
Fanshawe College	London	Ontario	21,000 full-time; 22,000 part-time	1967
George Brown College	Toronto	Ontario	31,000+ full-time; 64,000+ part-time	1967
Humber Polytechnic	Toronto	Ontario	33,000+ full-time; 23,000+ part-time	1968
Kwantlen Polytechnic University	Surrey	British Columbia	20,000+	1981
Northern Alberta Institute of Technology	Edmonton	Alberta	16,000+ full time; 11,000+ part time	1962
Red River College Polytechnic	Winnipeg	Manitoba	30,000	1938
Southern Alberta Institute of Technology	Calgary	Alberta	15,000+ full-time; 20,000+ part-time	1916
Saskatchewan Polytechnic	Saskatoon	Saskatchewan	8,500+ full-time; 1,800+ part-time	1959
Seneca Polytechnic	Toronto	Ontario	30,000+ full-time; 60,000 part-time	1967
Sheridan College	Oakville	Ontario	27,000+ full-time; 4,000+ part-time	1967

== See also ==
- Higher education in Canada
- List of colleges in Ontario
- List of colleges in Alberta
- List of colleges in British Columbia
