= Don Mills Middle School =

Coordinates: 43°44′09.8″N 79°20′21.5″W

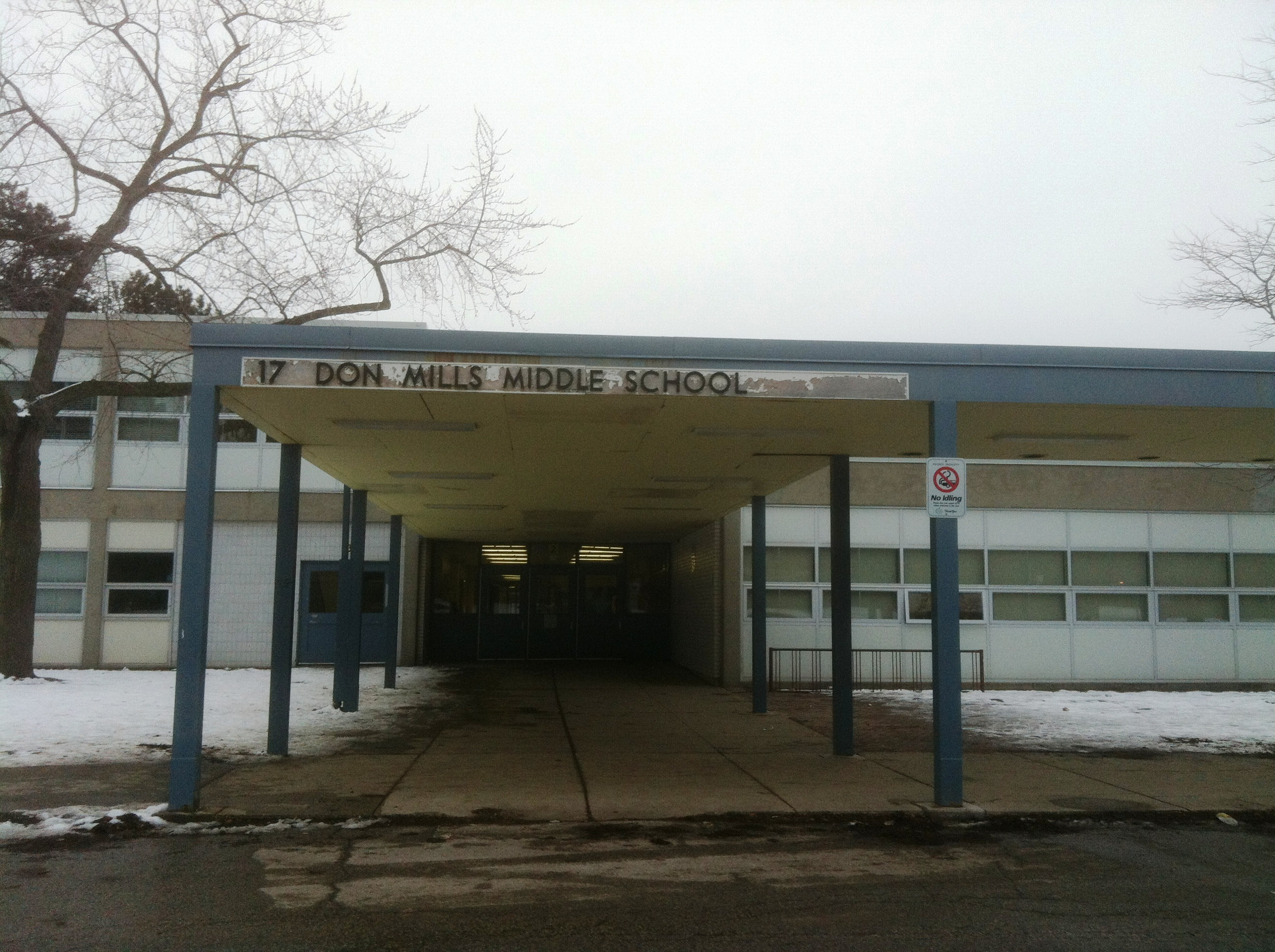

Location
- 17 The Donway East; Toronto, Ontario, M3C 1X6; Canada

Information
- School type: Public Middle School
- Motto: Awesome Lives Here
- Established: 1959
- School board: Toronto District School Board
- Superintendent: Courtney Lewis
- Area trustee: Trixie Doyle
- Principal: Carla Robbins
- Grades: 6 - 8
- Enrollment: 448 (Spring 2020)
- Language: English
- Area: Toronto
- Colours: Blue and Silver
- Mascot: Dolphin
- Team name: Don Mills Dolphins (DMMS Dolphins)
- Website: schoolweb.tdsb.on.ca/donmillsmiddle/

Don Mills Middle School (DMMS) is a middle school in Toronto, Ontario. It is located near the intersection Don Mills Road and Lawrence Avenue. The school was known as Don Mills Junior High School until 1986.

DMMS shares its building with Don Mills Collegiate Institute, a high school, although they have different street addresses. The two schools share a library and all of its resources (books, videos and computers), but no other rooms.

== Programs and activities ==
DMMS offers many educational programs and co-curricular activities. Those programs include band, yearbook club, scrapbooking, tutoring (being a tutor or having one) and many others which students take part in.

At the middle school, teachers generously donate their own time to coaching sports teams. The sports include boy's and girls soccer, football, volleyball, cross country, track and field, swimming, basketball, badminton, tennis.

The CyberARTS program is open to students from outside school boundaries and promotes the integration of literacy, numeracy and the arts. The students can apply for grade seven and eight and six CyberART classes, but are not guaranteed to be selected from the many applicants.

== Honor and merit rolls ==
Don Mills Middle School has an honor and merit roll assembly each term, to recognize the students who achieved average grades over 75.5%, which is a potential Merit roll, and over 79.5%, which is a potential Honor Roll. At the end of each year, among the graduating students, the student or students, with the best academic performance receive the Principal's Award. Don Mills Middle School currently does not award Principal's Honour Rolls. Honor rolls are to recipients who demonstrate good academic knowledge.
