= Don Valley Village =

- Neighbourhood
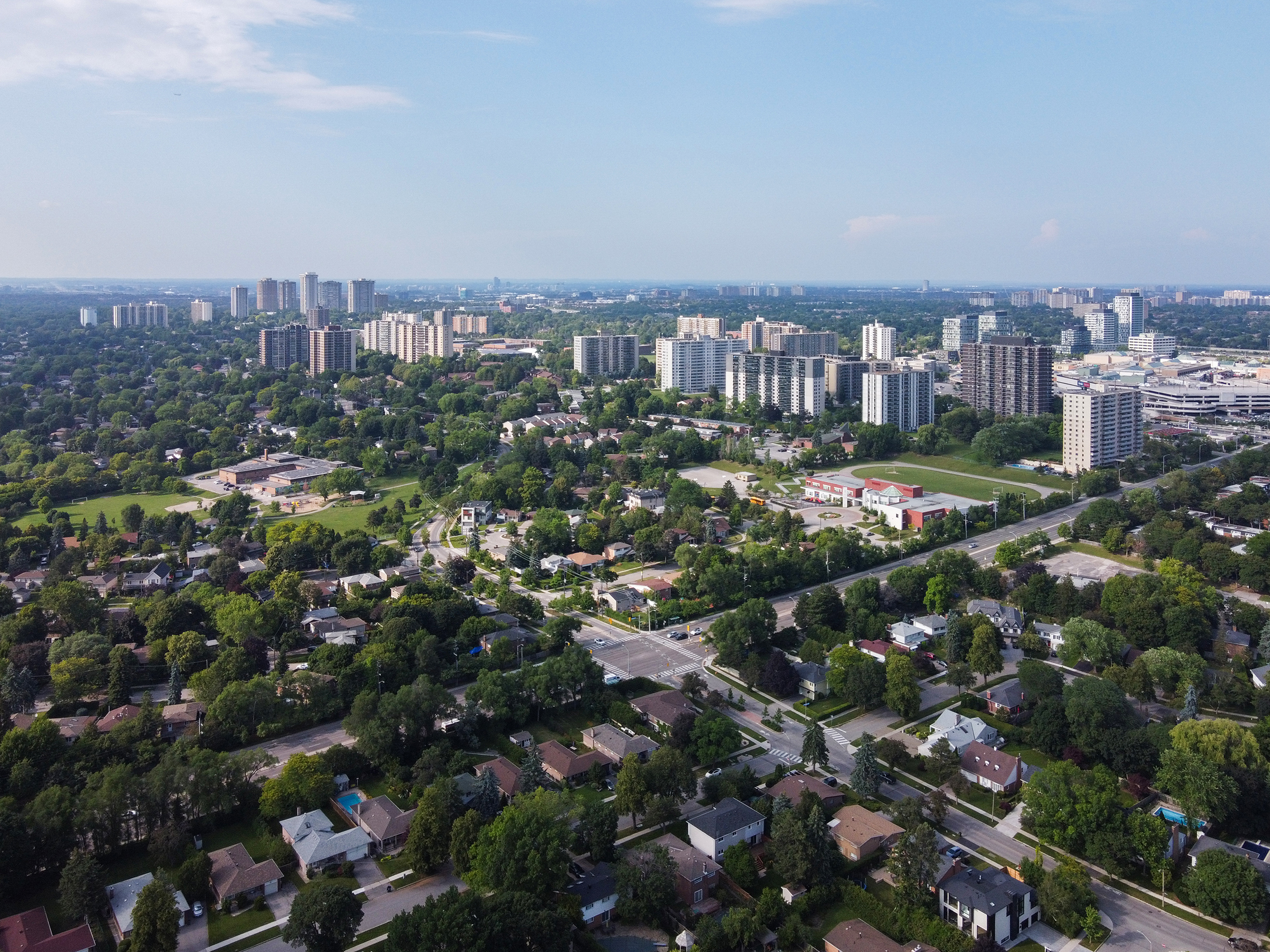
- Large apartment towers are located on the major avenues in Don Valley Village

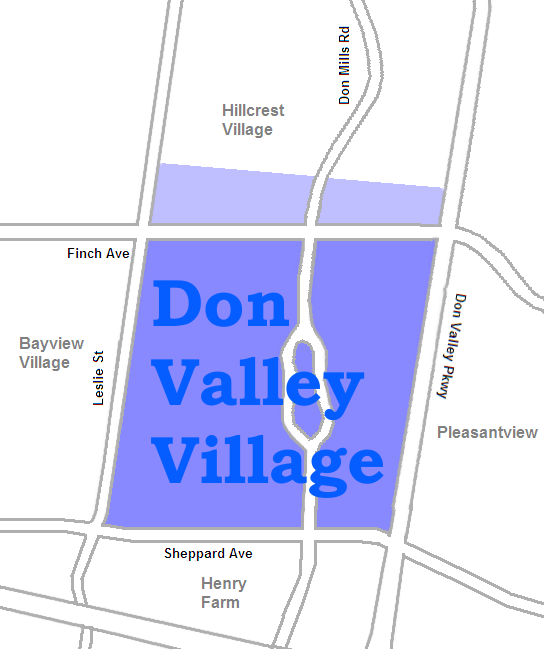
- Country: Canada
- Province: Ontario
- City: Toronto
- Municipality established: 1850 York Township
- Changed municipality: 1922 North York from York Township
- Changed municipality: 1998 Toronto from North York

Don Valley Village is a neighbourhood in the city of Toronto, Ontario, Canada. It is located in the former suburb of North York. Located north of Highway 401 and bisected by Don Mills Road, it is bounded by Sheppard Avenue to the south, Leslie Street to the west, Finch Avenue to the north and Highway 404 to the east. Like the nearby Don River Valley (to the east), the neighbourhood has hill and dale topography.

== History ==
The neighbourhood was originally a collection of farming hamlets in the early 19th century and takes its name from the Don Valley in Yorkshire, UK. Two historical landmarks still exist from that period: the Zion Schoolhouse and the Alexander Muirhead Victorian farmhouse.

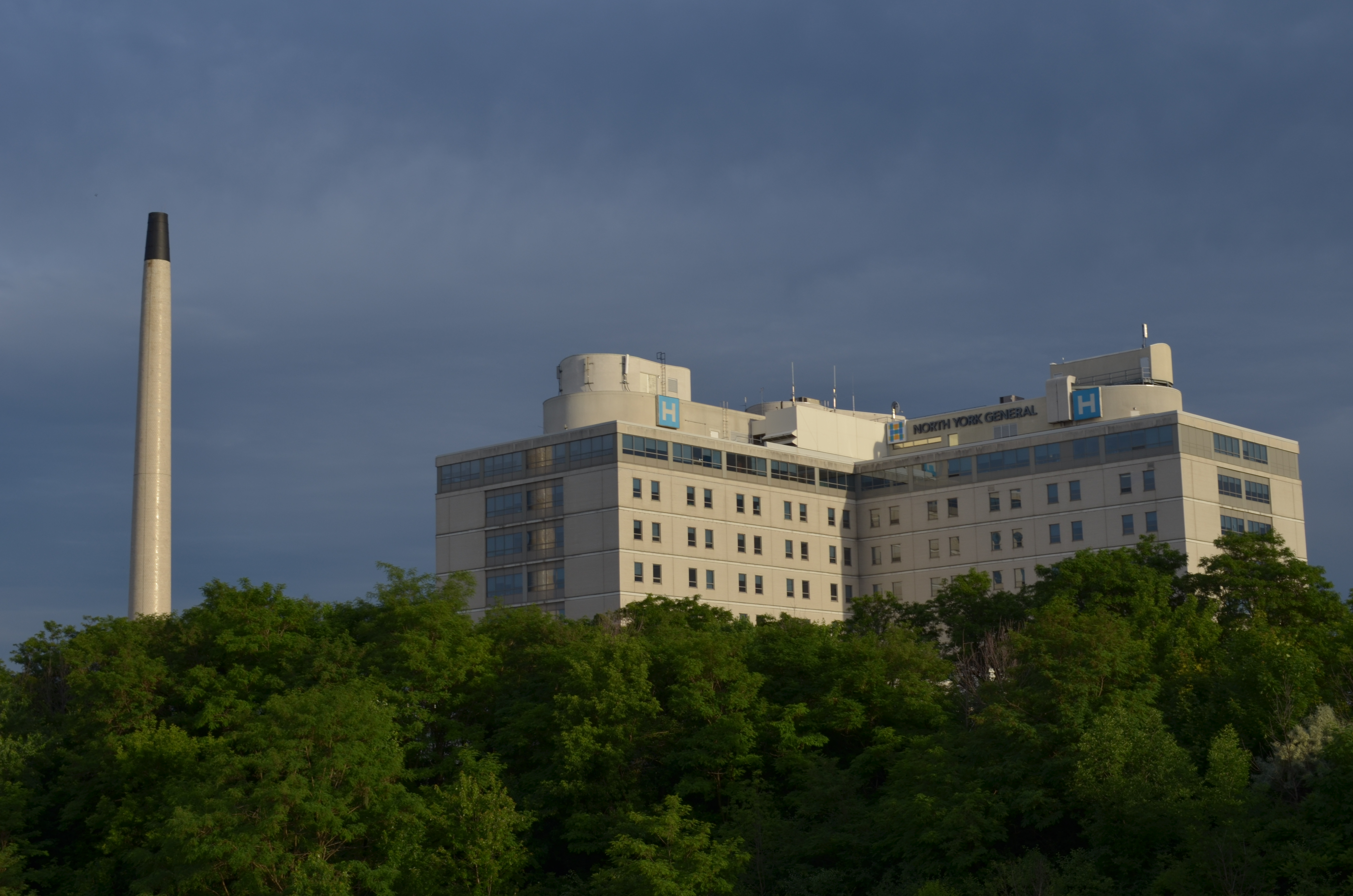
North York General Hospital was opened in 1968 in the southwest of the neighbourhood.

The area was developed into a suburban neighbourhood in the 1960s and 1970s. In 1963, Consolidated Building Corporation developed a large part of Don Valley Village, advertising three-bedroom houses for $16,550, and providing a "trade-in" on purchasers' current houses. Major facilities built in the neighbourhood during this period, including the North York General Hospital in 1968.

=== The Peanut ===
Don Valley Village encompasses smaller, non-official neighbourhoods. The most prominent of these is "The Peanut", which is centered on 43°47′00″N 79°21′05″W. It is named for the peanut-shaped plot of land created by divergence of the north and southbound lanes of Don Mills Road north of Sheppard Avenue and south of Finch Avenue. The north and southbound lanes, known as Don Mills Road West and Don Mills Road East, split and then are re-joined south of Finch Avenue. This configuration was modeled after Queen's Park in downtown Toronto.

The plot of land formed between the divergent lanes is the site of Woodbine Junior High School, Woodbine Public Arena, Oriole Park and the Oriole Community Resource Centre, Georges Vanier Secondary School, and the "Peanut Plaza" shopping centre. The areas to the east and west of the Peanut are usually referred to as Don Valley Village. Local teens and youths often refer to the surrounding area as the "Four Corners" due to the location of four notable housing projects in the area (Sparrowways, Villaways, Allenbury Gardens, and Brahms, which is located on the north side of Finch, in Hillcrest Village).

== Demographics ==
Don Valley Village contains low- to middle-income housing, and is home to many new Canadian immigrants, including those of Romanian, Armenian, Chinese, Caribbean, Indian, African, or Middle Eastern descent. The mix of housing here includes split level homes, semi-detached homes, and family size detached houses featuring Georgian, Tudor, and contemporary-style designs. There are also a large concentration of high-rise apartment and condominium buildings. It is home to four notable housing projects (Sparrowways, Villaways, Allenbury Gardens, and Brahms), which comprises "4 Corners."

== Education ==
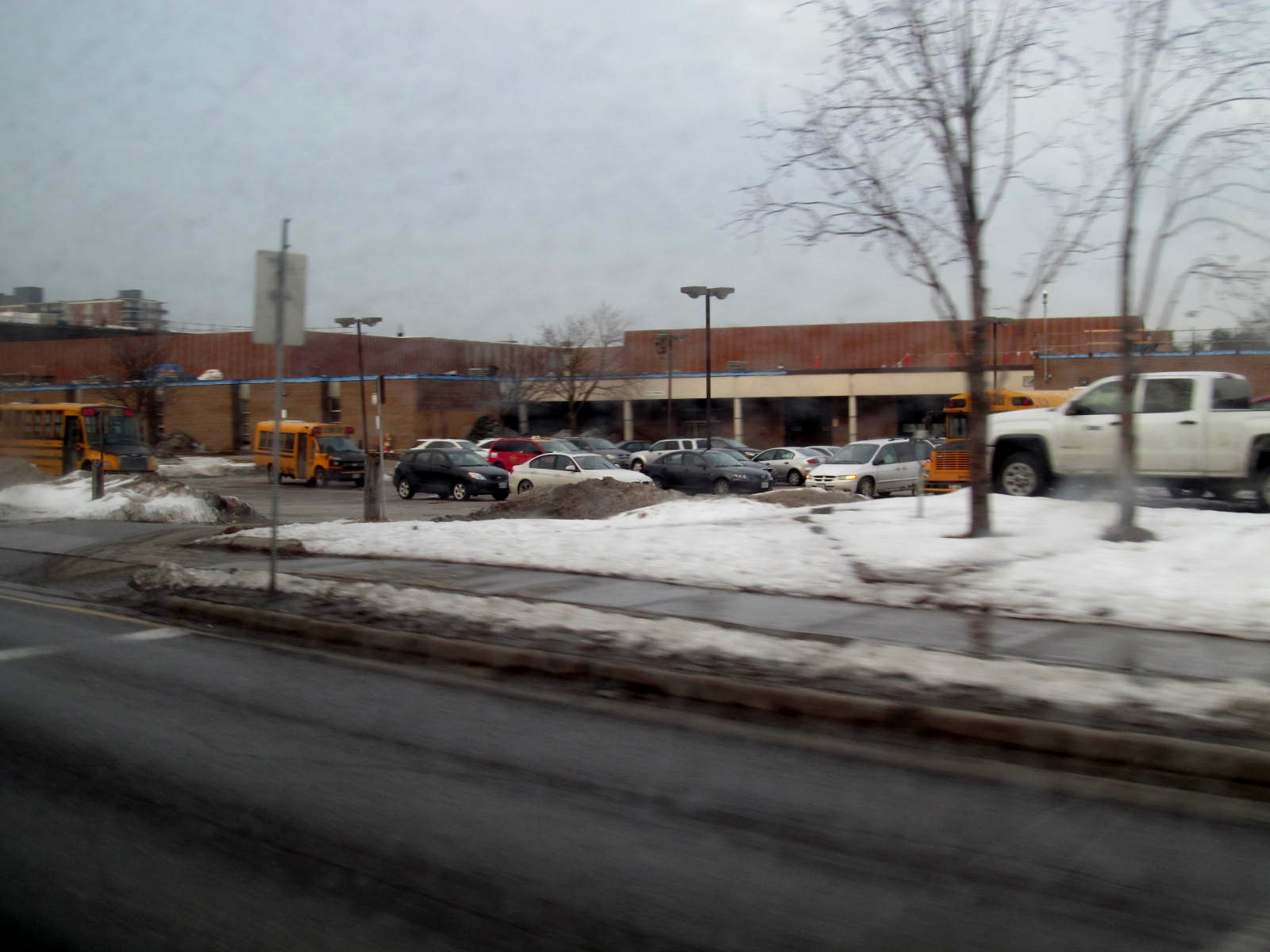
Georges Vanier Secondary School is a secondary school located in the neighbourhood.

Two public school boards operate schools in Don Valley Village, the separate Toronto Catholic District School Board (TCDSB), and the secular Toronto District School Board (TDSB). Both TCDSB, and TDSB operate public elementary and middle school. Public institutions in the neighbourhood that offer primary education include:

- Crestview Public School (TDSB)
- Dallington Public School (TDSB)
- Don Valley Middle School (TDSB)
- Kingslake Public School (TDSB)
- Lescon Public School (TDSB)
- Our Lady of Guadalupe Catholic School (TCDSB)
- Seneca Hill Public School (TDSB)
- Divine Mercy Catholic School (TCDSB)
- St. Timothy Catholic School (TCDSB)
- Woodbine Middle School (TDSB)

TDSB operates one secondary school in the neighbourhood, Georges Vanier Secondary School. TCDSB does not operate a secondary school in the neighbourhood, with TCDSB secondary school students residing in Don Valley Village attending institutions in adjacent neighbourhoods. The French first language public secular school board, Conseil scolaire Viamonde, and it separate counterpart, Conseil scolaire catholique MonAvenir also offer schooling to applicable residents of Don Valley Village, although they do not operate a school in the neighbourhood. CSCM and CSV students attend schools situated in other neighbourhoods in Toronto.

In addition to primary and secondary education, the neighbourhood is also home to Seneca College's Newham Campus. The college is a public post-secondary institution.

== Recreation ==
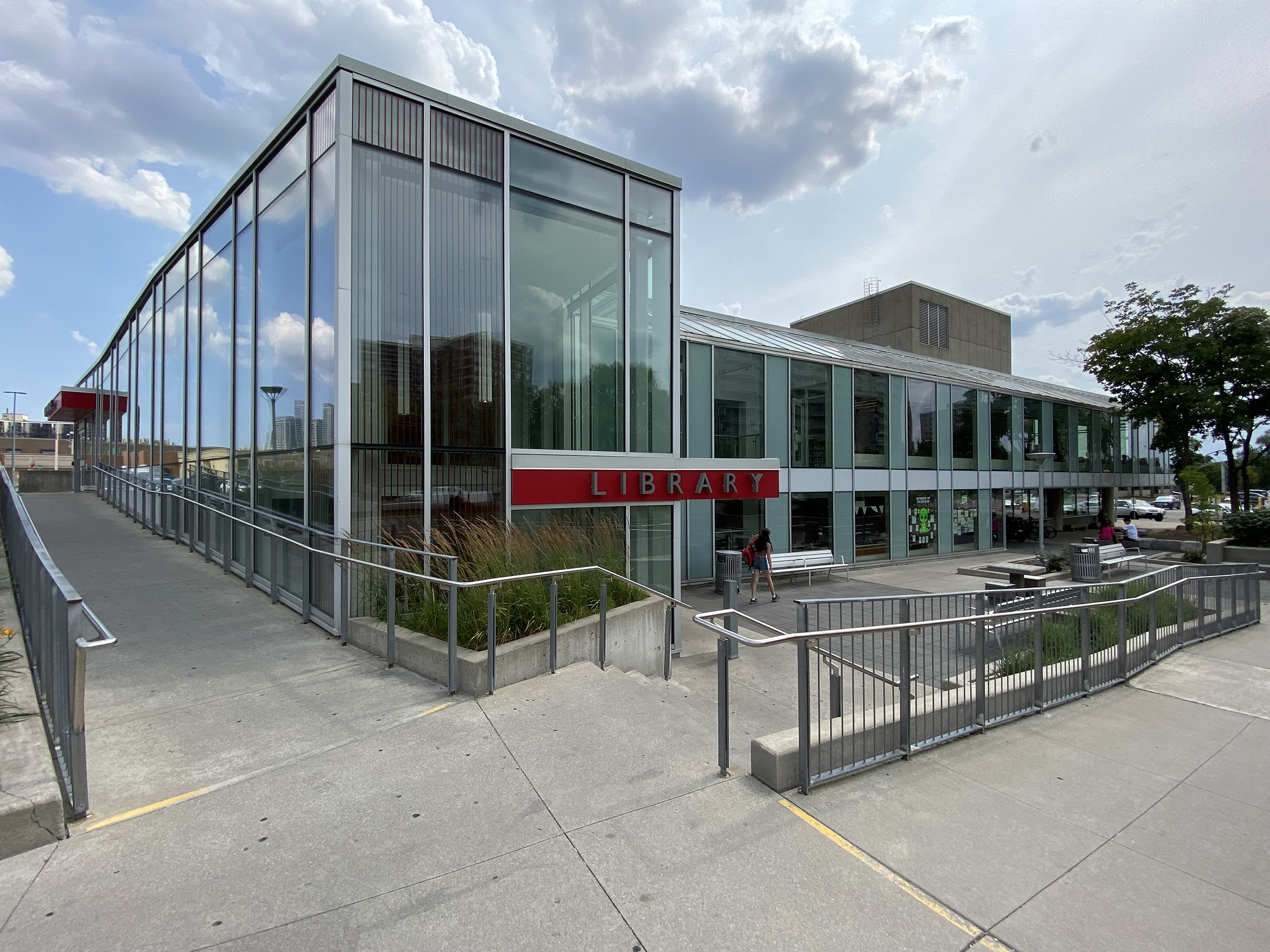
The Fairview branch of the Toronto Public Library is located in Don Valley Village.

Don Valley Village is home to several municipal parks including Dallington Park, Godstone Park, Hobart Park, Linus Park, Lescon Park, and Oriole Park. Municipal parks in the neighbourhood are managed by Toronto Parks, Forestry and Recreation Division. In addition to municipal parks, the division also manages two community centres in the neighbourhood, Oriole Community Centre and Arena, and Seneca Village Community Centre. The Fairview branch of the Toronto Public Library is also situated in Don Valley Village.

Opened in 1970, Fairview Mall is a large shopping centre located in Don Valley Village. The mall is one of five major shopping centres situated in Toronto.

== Transportation ==
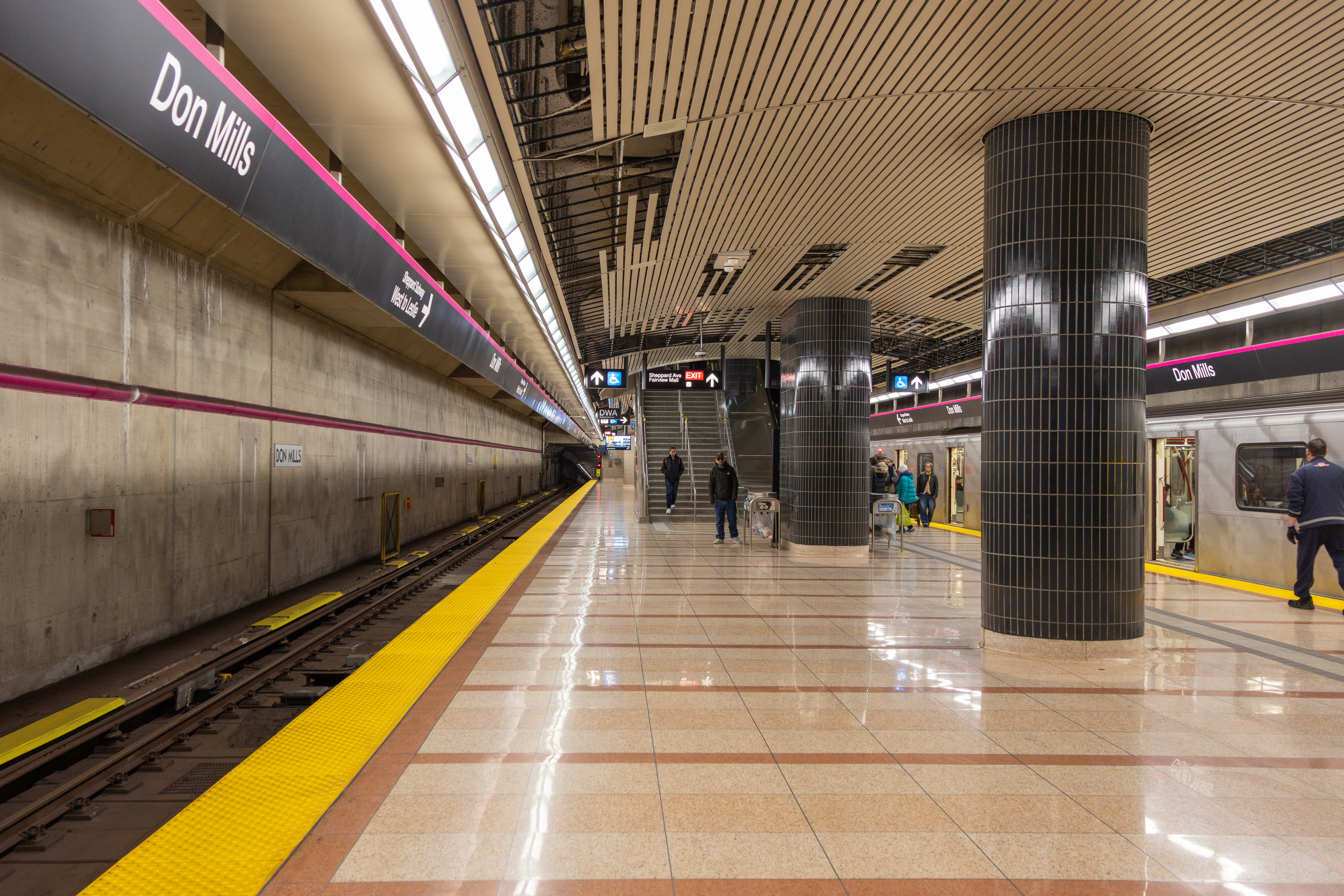
Don Mills station is a subway station located in the neighbourhood.

The area is extremely well connected to the rest of the city. Several major roadways serve as the neighbourhood's boundaries, including Sheppard Avenue to the south, and Highway 404 to the east. Highway 404 is a north-south controlled access highway that passes connects various communities in northern Toronto and the Greater Toronto. Controlled access highways, the Don Valley Parkway, and Highway 401 are situated south of the neighbourhood. Other major roadways that pass through the neighbourhood include Finch Avenue, and Don Mills Road.

Public transportation in the neighbourhood is provided by the Toronto Transit Commission (TTC), including several bus routes, and the Toronto subway system. Line 4 Sheppard of the Toronto subway is accessible from Don Mills station, adjacent to Fairview Mall. In addition to TTC buses, bus routes operated by York Region Transit, including Viva Green bus rapid transit line, are accessible from Don Mills station.

== Notable residents ==
- Snow, dancehall and reggae musician
