= Sheppard Avenue =

Road in Toronto, Ontario, Canada

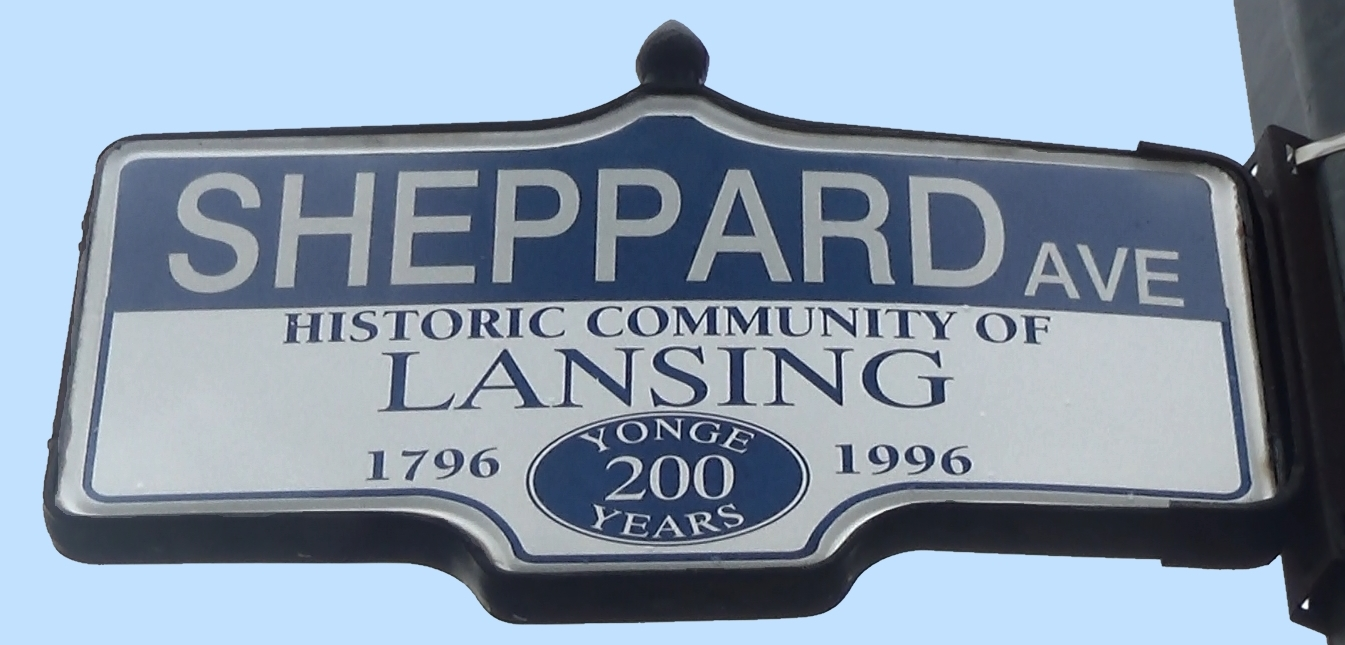
- Twyn Rivers Drive
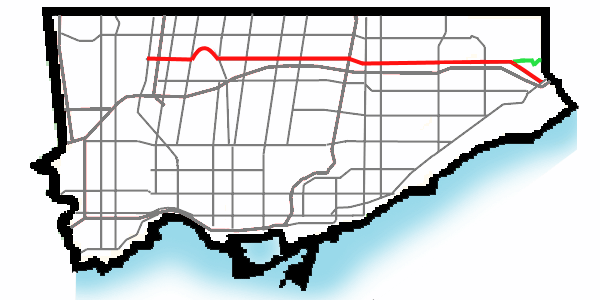
- Sheppard Ave. (Red) and Twyn Rivers Dr. (Green) within Toronto
- Interactive map of Sheppard Avenue
- Maintained by: City of Toronto; City of Pickering
- Location: Toronto; Pickering
- West end: Weston Road
- Major junctions: Jane Street; Keele Street; Allen Road (To Dufferin Street north); Bathurst Street; Yonge Street; Bayview Avenue; Leslie Street; Don Mills Road; Highway 404; Victoria Park Avenue; Warden Avenue; Kennedy Road; McCowan Road; Markham Road; Neilson Road; Morningside Avenue; Meadowvale Road ------Road branches------ Atona Road (Pickering); Whites Road (Pickering)
- East end: Toronto: Kingston Road (Continues south as Port Union Road); Pickering: Fairport Road
Nearby arterial roads in Toronto
| ← Wilson Avenue; York Mills Road; Ellesmere Road; Kingston Road | Finch Avenue → |

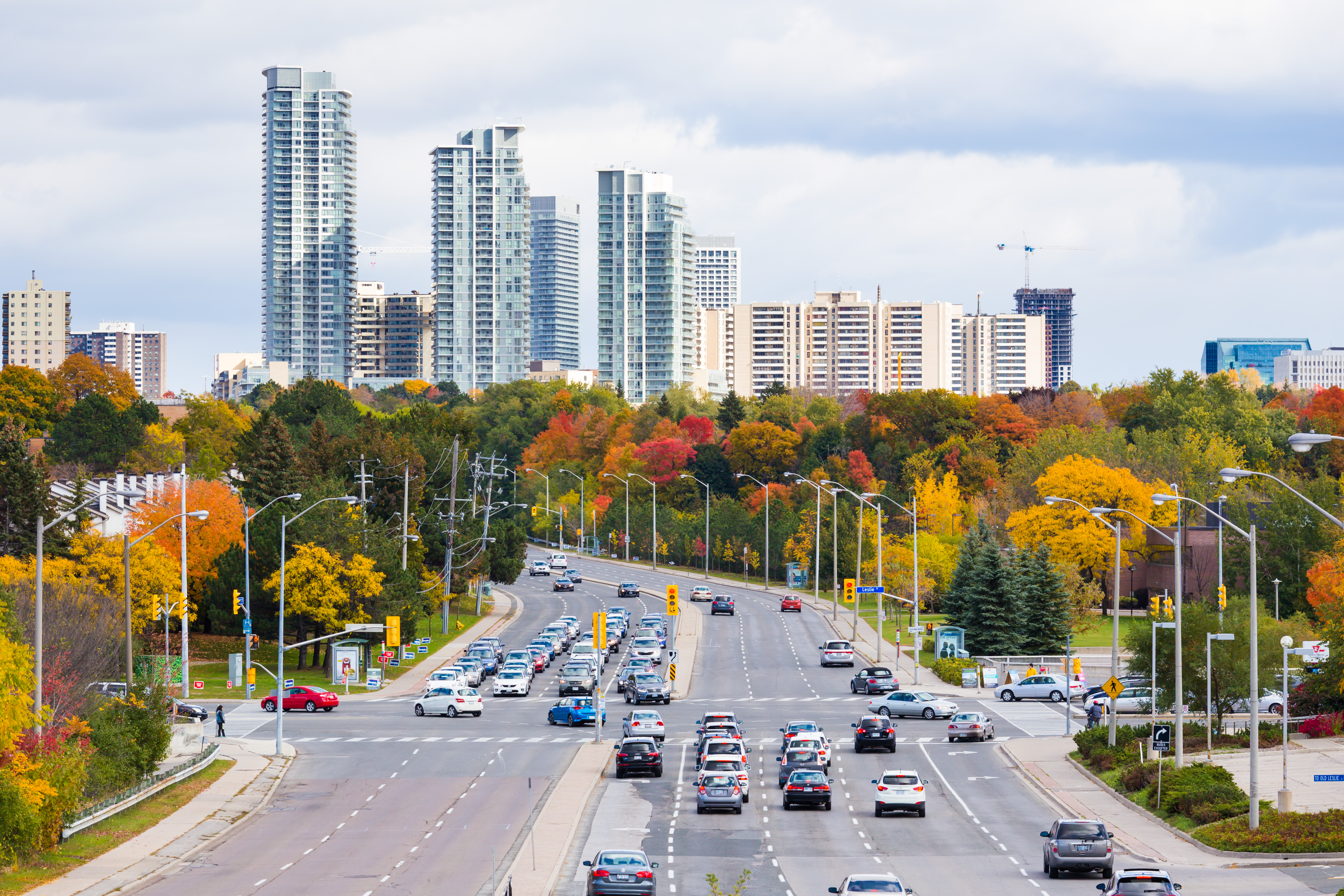
Sheppard Avenue near Henry Farm

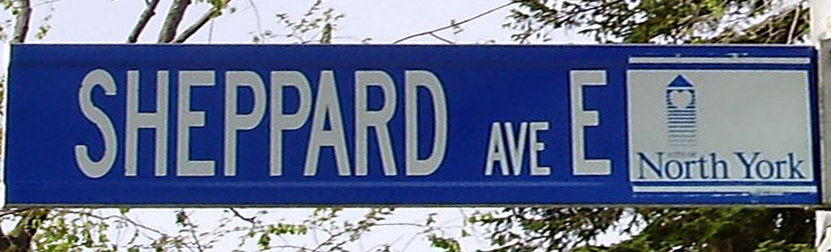
A Sheppard Avenue East street sign which retains North York markings.

Sheppard Avenue is an east–west principal arterial road in Toronto, Ontario, Canada. The street has two distinct branches near its eastern end, with the original route being a collector road leading to Pickering via a turnoff, and the main route following a later-built roadway which runs south to Kingston Road. To avoid name duplication, the Toronto portion of the northern branch was renamed Twyn Rivers Drive. The section of the street entirely in Toronto is 34.2 kilometres in length, while the Pickering section and Twyn Rivers Dr. is 5.4 kilometres long.

== History ==
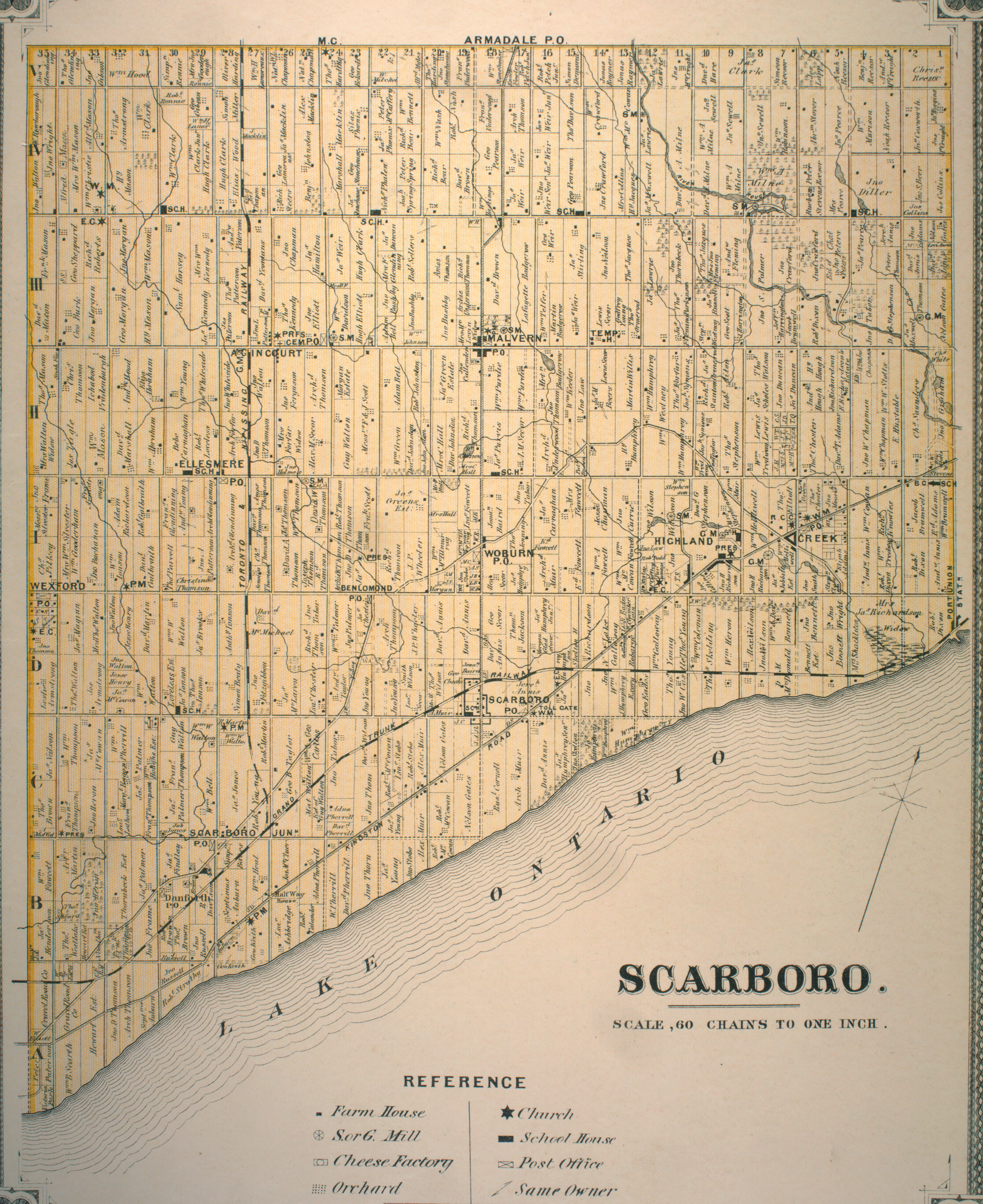
An 1880s survey map of Scarborough showing the original route of Sheppard (halfway up map on right) along Twyn Rivers Drive.

Sheppard was a sideroad between lots 15 and 16 York Township

In the former Scarborough municipality, Sheppard was once called the Lansing Sideroad. A post office known as "Lansing" occupied the corner of Yonge and Sheppard.

== Route description ==
=== Sheppard Avenue East ===
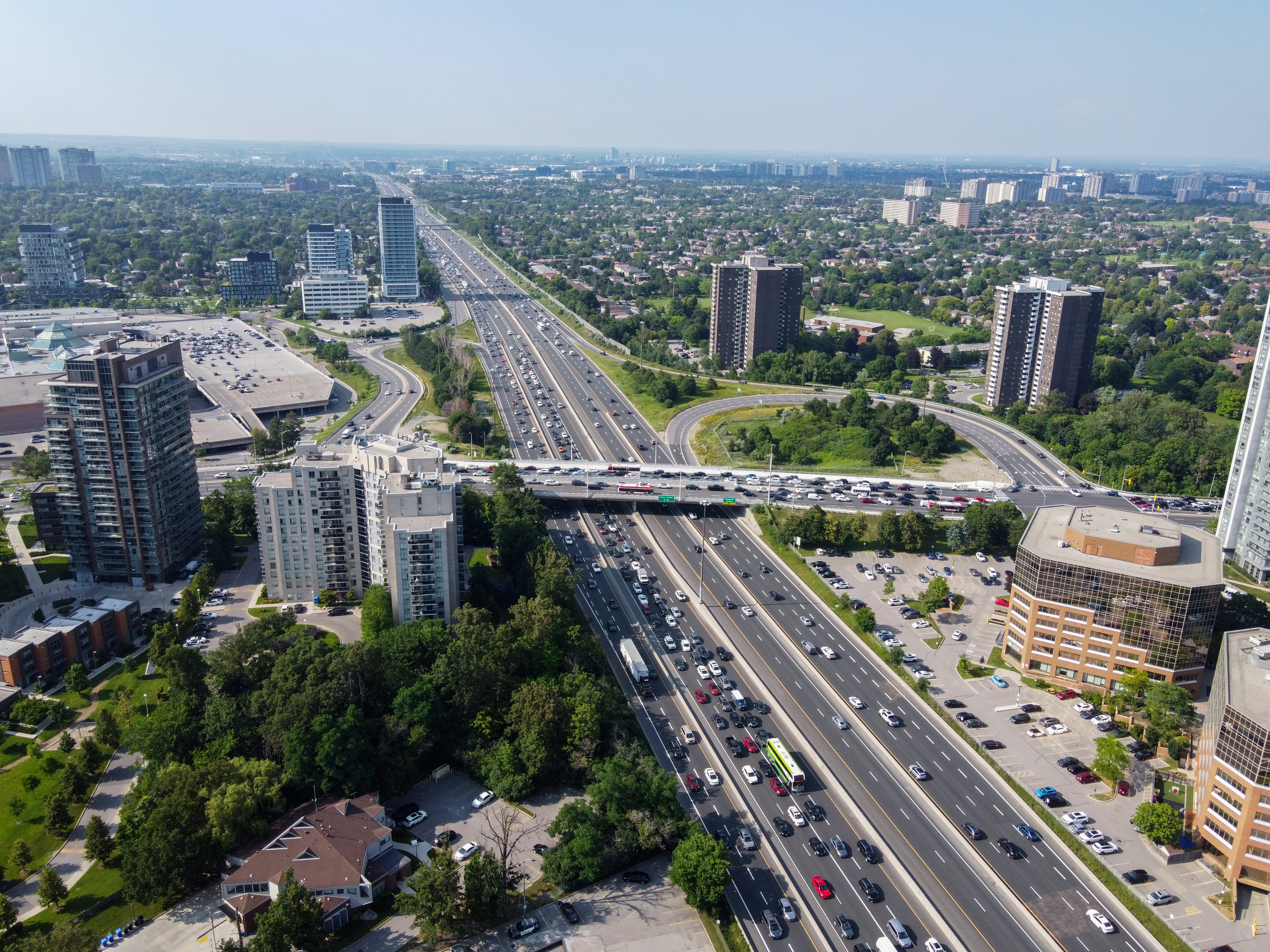
Sheppard Avenue is carried across the lanes of Highway 404.

East of Yonge Street, Sheppard travels east through North York to Highway 404. Historically, it continued straight to Victoria Park Avenue at the Scarborough border, where drivers then turned south to meet up with the Sheppard section through Scarborough. However, a new section called the Lansing Cutoff was constructed joining the two disconnected pieces. The orphaned section of Sheppard between the 404 and Victoria Park was renamed Old Sheppard Avenue. 43°46′34″N 79°20′13″W

Sheppard continues straight east through Scarborough until just east of Meadowvale Road, where the Rouge River valley presents steep grades 43°48′33″N 79°09′58″W, and so Sheppard curves southwards to meet Kingston Road just north of Highway 401. At that intersection, it defaults into Port Union Road, which heads south into the Port Union neighbourhood. However, the street originally continued straight east into the Rouge valley, but that section was renamed Twyn Rivers Drive after the connection to Port Union Rd. was made in the early 1950s, though the renaming was not applied to the entirety of the bypassed section (thus officially giving the street its two branches) beyond Altona Road just east of the Toronto-Pickering limits in Durham Region. It continues farther east as a collector road until it ends at Fairport Road just north of Kingston Road. 43°49′28″N 79°06′26″W

=== Sheppard Avenue West ===
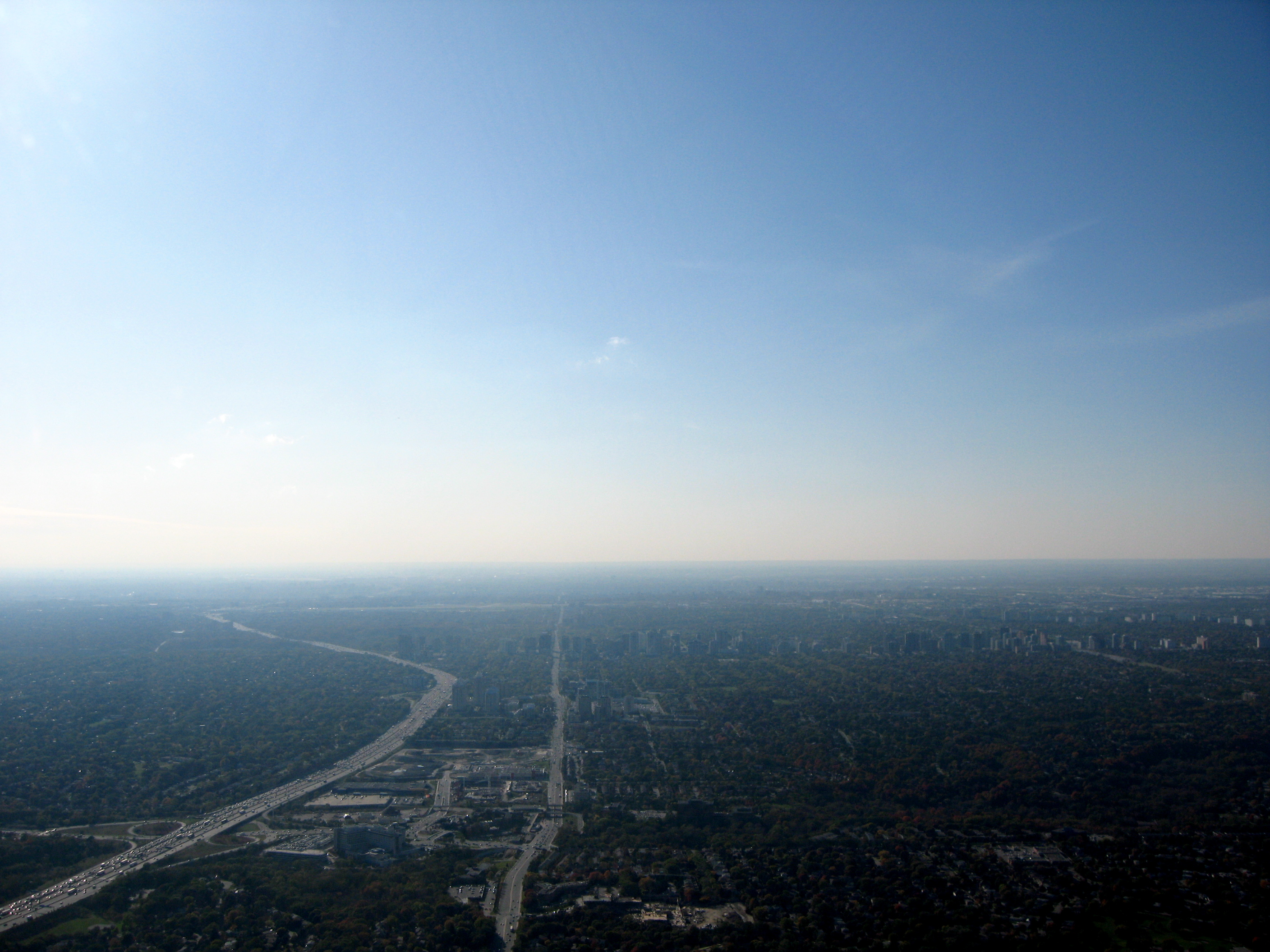
Sheppard Avenue facing west. Leslie Street is visible in the foreground, and Allen Road in the background. The horizontal strip of buildings near the centre flankYonge Street

West of Yonge Street, Sheppard travels west across the Sheppard Avenue Bridge over the Don and past Bathurst Street and Wilson Heights Boulevard. Further west, the road allowance became blocked in 1939 by the appropriation of land for a De Havilland aircraft plant and, after World War II, Canadian Forces Base Downsview. A crescent-shaped section of road was finally constructed along the northern edge of the now former base in the 1970s, connecting Sheppard at Wilson Heights to Keele Street. 43°45′17″N 79°28′42″W Today, Sheppard also intersects Allen Road on this section, but the intersecting portion of Allen Road was not constructed until 1982. Sheppard Avenue continues still further west to Weston Road and ends there due to the wide valley at the confluence of the two branches of the Humber River, preventing it from continuing further west.

== Public transportation ==
The Line 4 Sheppard subway runs under Sheppard Avenue East from Yonge Street to Don Mills Road, with proposals to continue the line farther eastwards to the Scarborough Town Centre and westwards to Sheppard West station at Allen Road. There are five stations on the line providing access to Sheppard Avenue, including Bayview, Bessarion, and Leslie, as well as the Sheppard–Yonge (at the junction with the Yonge section of Line 1 Yonge–University) and Don Mills terminuses. Sheppard West station is located at the corner of Sheppard and Allen Road, and Downsview Park station is located between Keele Street and Allen Road. The extension of the Line 2 Bloor-Danforth subway will have the line terminate at Sheppard Avenue, where a future extension of Line 4 could meet with it in the future.

Six bus routes run along Sheppard Avenue in Toronto from Sheppard–Yonge station:

- 84 Sheppard West (1963–present)
- 85 Sheppard East (1963–present)
- 98 Willowdale-Senlac (1974–present)
- 185 Sheppard Central (2004–present)
- 384 Sheppard West (Blue Night; 2015–present)
- 385 Sheppard East (Blue Night; 2005–present)

Three express routes runs along Sheppard Avenue:

- 904 Sheppard Kennedy Express (1991–present)
- 984 Sheppard West Express (1999–present)
- 985 Sheppard East Express (1980–present)

Historical routes since 1990:

- 10 Van Horne (1980–2002)
- 26 Bayview North (1974–1991)
- 139 Huntingwood (1973–2002)

GO Transit has stations at Agincourt on the Stouffville line, on Sheppard between Kennedy Road and Midland Avenue, Oriole on the Richmond Hill line, southwest of the intersection of Leslie Street and Sheppard, and at Downsview Park on the Barrie line, on Sheppard between Keele Street and Allen Road.

== Communities ==
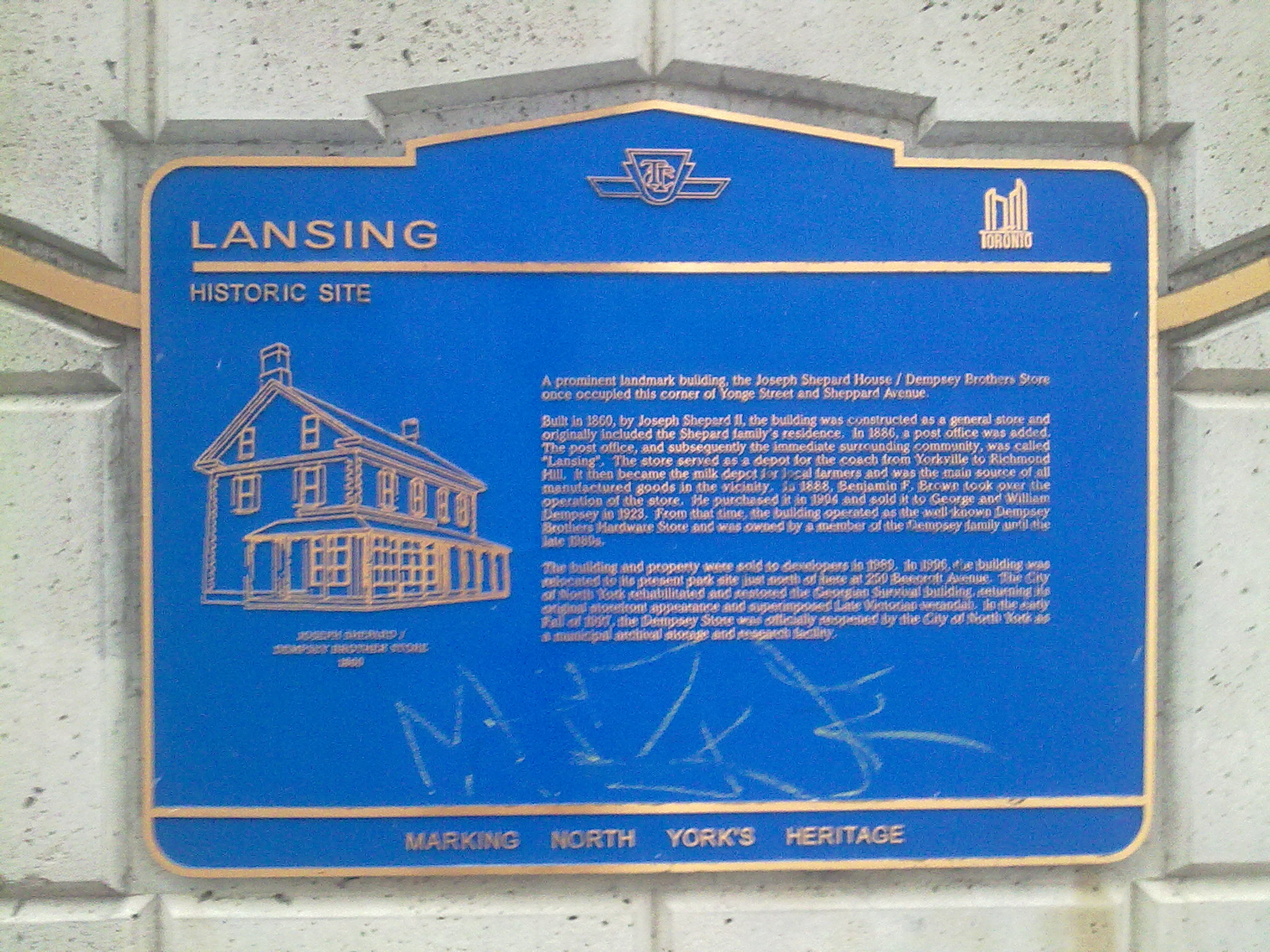
Lansing historical plaque on Sheppard Avenue.

- Emery
- Dublin Heights
- Elia
- Downsview
- Lansing
- Bayview Village
- Don Valley Village
- Willowdale
- North York Centre
- Henry Farm
- Parkway Forest
- The Peanut
- Agincourt
- Malvern
- L'Amoreaux

== Attractions and landmarks ==
- Bayview Village - retail shopping mall (adjacent to Bayview station)
- Sheppard Centre - retail, commercial and residential complex (connected to Sheppard–Yonge station)
- Fairview Mall - large retail shopping mall (connecting with Don Mills station)
- Agincourt Mall - mid-size retail shopping mall
- Downsview Park - park and recreational facility owned by federal government and on the former CFB Downsview lands
- LCol George Taylor Denison III Armoury
- North York General Hospital - major hospital and teaching unit of the University of Toronto's Faculty of Medicine (adjacent to Leslie station)
- Rouge Park - regional park in the east end of the city
- Toronto Zoo - zoo located in east end of the city
