= Don Mills Road =

Major north–south route in Toronto, Ontario, Canada

- York Regional Road 12
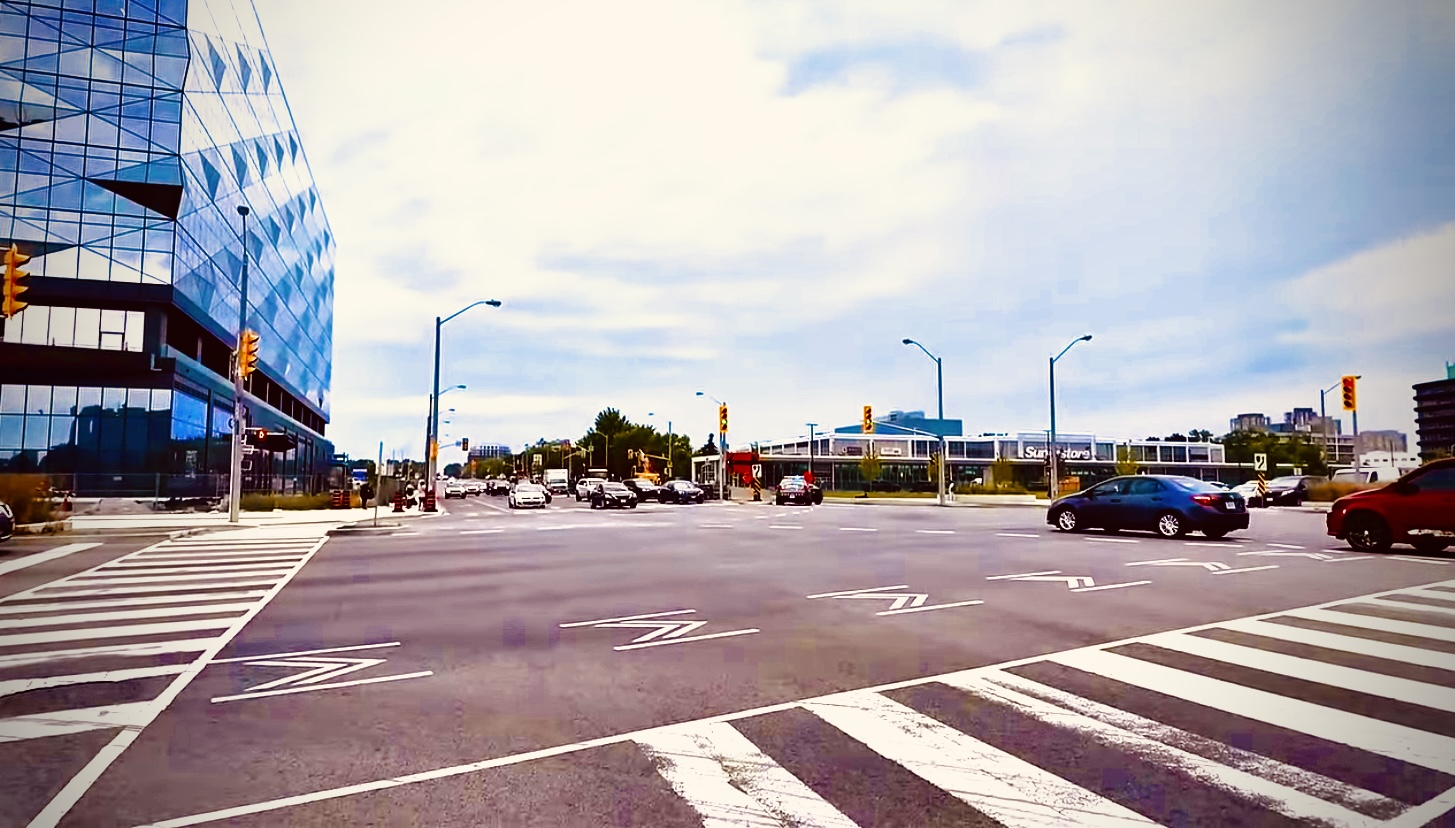
- Intersection of Don Mills Road and Eglinton Avenue, looking north toward Wynford Drive

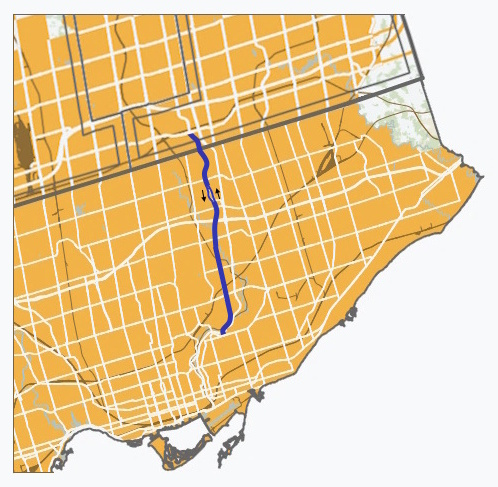
- Route of Don Mills Road through Toronto and Markham (blue line)
- Maintained by: City of Toronto; Region of York
- Length: 46 km (29 mi)
- Location: Toronto; Markham
- South end: O'Connor Drive in Toronto
- Major junctions: Don Valley Parkway; Eglinton Avenue; Lawrence Avenue; York Mills Road; Sheppard Avenue; Finch Avenue; Steeles Avenue
- North end: John Street in Markham (continues as Leslie Street)

Other
Nearby arterial roads
| ← Leslie Street; Bayview Avenue | Don Valley Parkway; Highway 404 → |

Don Mills Road is a north–south route in Toronto, Ontario, Canada, passing through the former cities of East York and North York. It begins at O'Connor Drive near ramps to the Don Valley Parkway, and ends at John Street in Markham, where it becomes a separate northern section of Leslie Street, which parallels it to the west south of the break. North of Steeles Avenue, the road is designated and signed as York Regional Road 12, which continues along Leslie.

From south to north, it passes through the Toronto neighbourhoods of Todmorden Village, Flemingdon Park, Don Mills, Graydon Hall, Henry Farm, Parkway Forest, Don Valley Village, and north of Steeles Avenue, German Mills in Markham.

Between Sheppard and Finch Avenues, Don Mills Road splits into two one-way curved boulevards named as Don Mills Road East and Don Mills Road West. This section is called The Peanut due to its shape on maps. It surrounds schools, a community centre, and the Peanut Plaza.

== History ==
Originally named Don Independent Road due to donations of the land by local farmers for the public improvement, the road was carrying traffic from many mills in the area: flour, grist, woollen, and sawmills, hence the current name.

In the 1950s, when the planned community of Don Mills was created, Don Mills Road was further extended north from this terminus into North York.

By 1990, Don Mills Road was widened from four to six lanes between Overlea Boulevard and York Mills Road. The two additional lanes became the first carpool diamond lanes in Toronto.

== Public transportation ==
Toronto Transit Commission bus routes that run along Don Mills Road include: 25 Don Mills, 100 Flemingdon Park, 325 Don Mills (Blue Night), 403 South Don Mills (community route), and 925 Don Mills Express (express route).

Since November 2002, Don Mills station located under Fairview Mall has served as a connection between the Sheppard subway line and a multitude of other bus routes. Line 5 Eglinton Has A Station Called “Don Valley” At Don Mills And Eglinton

There were plans by the Toronto Transit Commission to construct a light rail transit line along Don Mills from Steeles Avenue to Overlea Boulevard to Pape station with the Don Mills LRT, as part of the Transit City plan. The Ontario Line will run along this proposed route south of Eglinton Avenue, with future provisions to extend further north along Don Mills Road.

== Attractions ==
- Shops At Don Mills at Lawrence Avenue
- Fairview Mall at Sheppard Avenue
- The Peanut between Sheppard and Finch Avenue
- Seneca College, Newnham Campus on Finch
- The historic Zion Church Cultural Centre at Finch
- Don Mills Collegiate Institute

== Sources ==
- Muir, E.G. (2014). Riverdale: East of the Don. Dundurn. ISBN 978-1-4597-2872-1.
- Filey, M. (2004). Toronto Sketches 8: The Way We Were. Dundurn Press. p. 320. ISBN 978-1-55488-032-4.
