= Parkway Forest =

Neighbourhood of Toronto, Ontario, Canada

- Neighbourhood
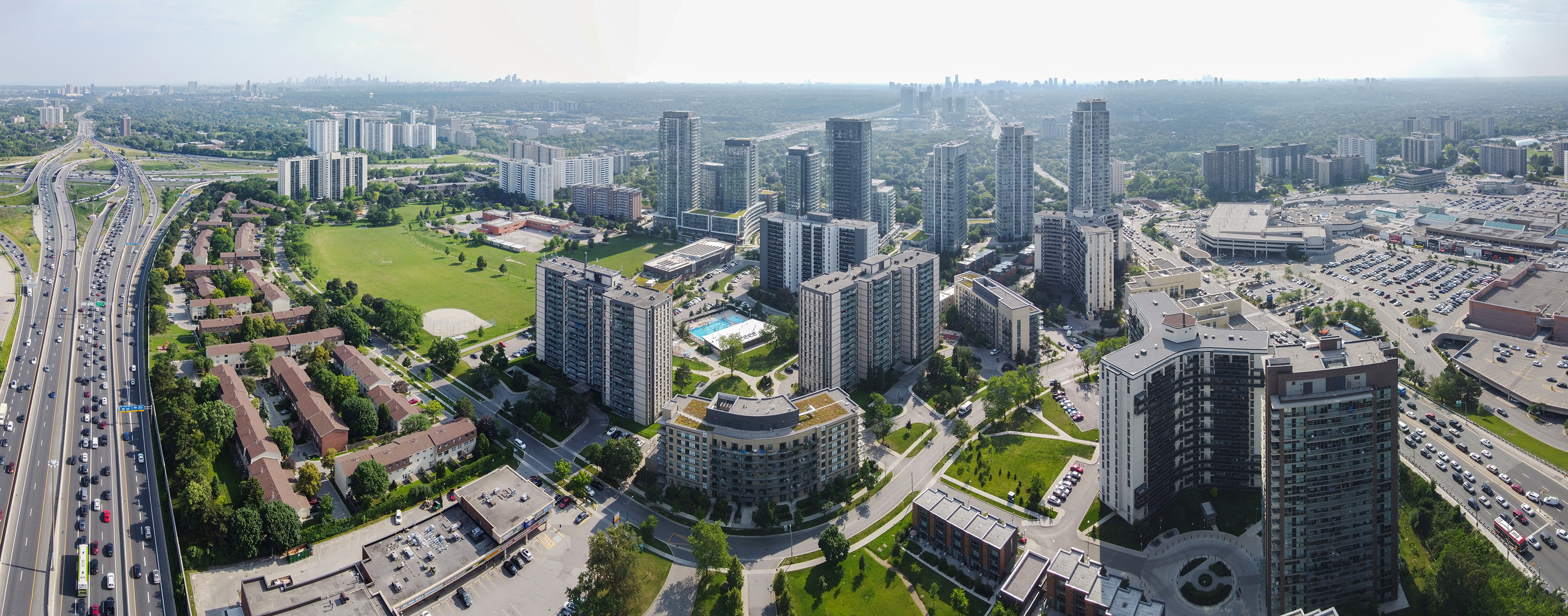
- Emerald City Condominiums and apartment towers of Parkway Forest

- Location in Toronto
- Coordinates: 43.7721°N 79.3427°W
- Country: Canada
- Province: Ontario
- City: Toronto
- Municipality established: 1850 York Township
- Changed municipality: 1922 North York from York Township
- Changed municipality: 1998 Toronto from North York
- Time zone: UTC−5 (EST)
  - Summer (DST): UTC−4 (EDT)
- Area codes: 416, 647

Parkway Forest is a neighbourhood in Toronto, Ontario, Canada. It is located in the north of the city, in the former suburb of North York. Parkway Forest is bounded on the west by Don Mills Road, on the north by Sheppard Avenue, on the east by the Don Valley Parkway, and on the south by Highway 401. It is contained within the city's officially designated neighbourhood of Henry Farm, although it is distinct in character from the residential community of that same name west of Don Mills Road. Parkway Forest is part of Ward 17 in the Toronto City Council, part of the new Don Valley North federal electoral district, and part of the Don Valley East provincial electoral district.

Parkway Forest is primarily residential, with luxury condominiums, high-rise rental apartment buildings, low-rise rental apartment buildings and townhouse complexes.

Parkway Forest sits directly to the south of the Fairview Mall shopping centre, and is served by the Don Mills subway station on the Toronto Transit Commission's Sheppard subway line.

Parkway Forest was initially developed as a "garden city" beginning in the late 1960s, with a mix of high- and low-rise apartments and townhouses. The majority of the neighbourhood's high-rise buildings were constructed between 1966 and 1972. An additional "affordable-housing development" was constructed at 121 Parkway Forest Drive in 2006, occupying what was previously the heavily wooded Forest Manor Park.

In early 2005, the North York Community Council committee of the Toronto City Council rejected a proposal to replace many of the low-rise apartment buildings and townhouses with seven high-rise condominium towers ranging in height from 39 to 49 storeys. A more modest proposal for neighbourhood redevelopment was later accepted as a new development called Emerald City. This plan included the demolition of mid-rise apartment buildings and townhouses with replacement units built as in-fill developments elsewhere in Parkway Forest. New condominium units were to be built to a maximum height of 36 storeys. In July 2009, construction of two 9-storey replacement rental towers began at the corner of Parkway Forest Drive and Sheppard Avenue. Construction has continued since that time; primarily with the addition of new townhouse, mid-rise, and high-rise residential buildings, but also with a new community centre, and public art.

Parkway Forest has a community association called the Parkway Forest Community Association, which represents local residents and seeks to address issues and opportunities within the neighbourhood.
