= Sheppard Avenue Bridge =

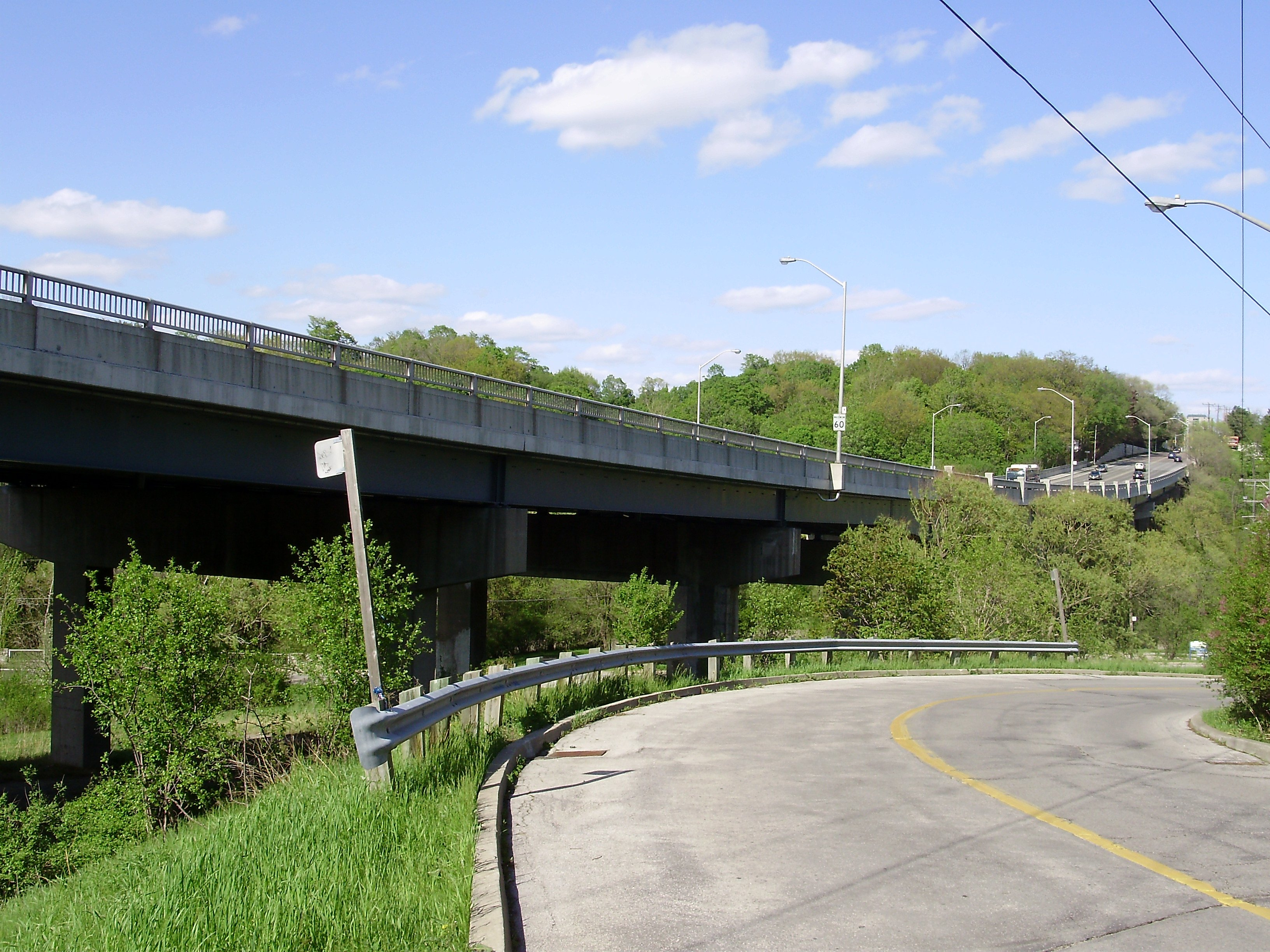
- Coordinates: 43°45′25″N 79°25′48″W
- Carries: 4 lanes of Sheppard Avenue West
- Crosses: West Don River
- Locale: Toronto, Ontario, Canada
- Maintained by: Toronto Transportation

Characteristics
- Design: Under deck truss bridge
- Clearance below: Don River Valley

History
- Opened: 1954
- Rebuilt: 2007 (after repairs made due to water main break)

Location
- Interactive map of Sheppard Avenue Bridge

Sheppard Avenue Bridge is an under deck Truss bridge that spans the Don River on Sheppard Avenue West, just east of Bathurst Street in Toronto, Ontario, Canada. Built in 1954, the bridge has a scenic view of the West Don River and Earl Bales Park. The current bridge replaced an old concrete bridge that was damaged during Hurricane Hazel and required cars to descend down the valley.

The upper deck carries four lanes of traffic. There is a water main in the steel sub-structure.

In April 2006, a small section of the road collapsed due to a break in the 50-year-old water main carried below. The bridge was out of commission for three weeks.

The bridge is the last major bridge to span the West Don River before it is diverted under most roads north of Sheppard with metal or concrete culverts. Several smaller concrete bridges traverse over the East Don River (with one larger bridge on Eglinton Avenue near the Don Valley Parkway) northwards towards the city limits at Steeles Avenue.
