= Don Mills station =

Toronto subway station

Don Mills
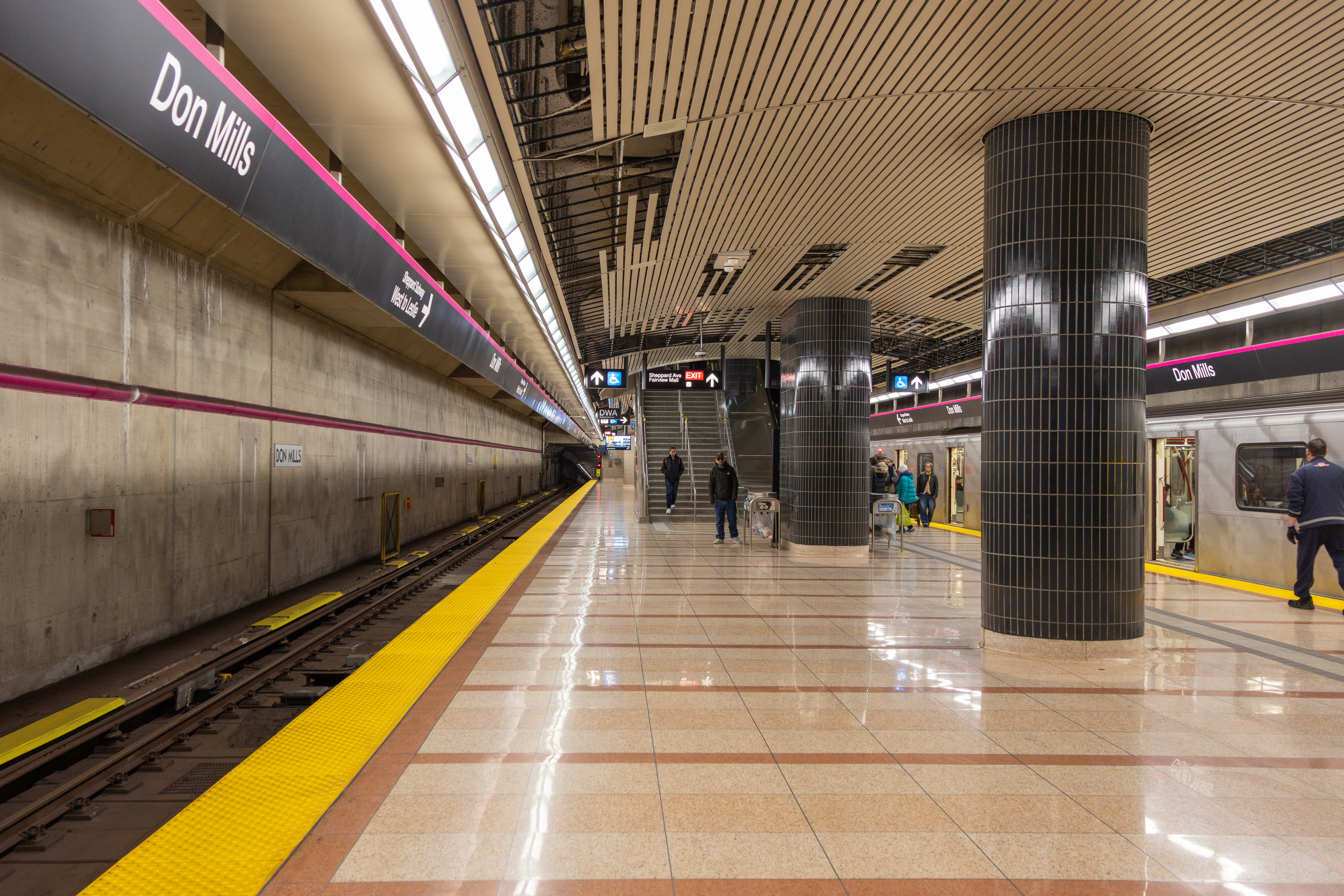

General information
- Location: 1700 Sheppard Avenue East; Toronto, Ontario; Canada
- Coordinates: 43°46′31″N 79°20′45″W
- Platforms: Centre platform
- Tracks: 2
- Connections: TTC buses: 10 Van Horne; 24B Victoria Park; 25 Don Mills; 85 Sheppard East; 167 Pharmacy North; 169 Huntingwood; 185 Sheppard Central; 325 Don Mills; 385 Sheppard East; 904 Sheppard Kennedy Express; 925 Don Mills Express; 985 Sheppard East Express; YRT buses: 24 Woodbine; 90 Leslie

Construction
- Structure type: Underground
- Parking: 366 spaces
- Accessible: Yes
- Architect: Stevens Group Architects

Other information
- Website: Official station page

History
- Opened: November 24, 2002; 23 years ago

Passengers
- 2023–2024: 28,709
- Rank: 19 of 70

Services
Preceding station	Toronto Transit Commission	Following station
Leslie towards Sheppard–Yonge	Line 4 Sheppard	Terminus
Location

Don Mills is a subway station that is the eastern terminus of Line 4 Sheppard in Toronto, Ontario, Canada. The station is at the northeast corner of Sheppard Avenue East and Don Mills Road, within the residential communities of Don Valley Village and Henry Farm, adjacent to Fairview Mall. The station is close to Highways 401 and 404, as well as the Don Valley Parkway. Other nearby landmarks include Georges Vanier Secondary School and the Fairview branch of the Toronto Public Library.

== History ==
The station opened in 2002 as part of the original Line 4. A plaque at the platform level commemorates John Marinzel, a worker who died on April 18, 2001, of injuries from an accident during the construction of the station. A Vivastation for the Viva Green line of York Region's Viva Rapid Transit system opened on October 16, 2005.

== Description ==
Like all stations on the Sheppard line, Don Mills is fully accessible. The station is equipped with three elevators connecting the concourse level with the bus platforms and two street entrances, and a single elevator between the island train platform and the concourse. Stairs and escalators provide regular pedestrian access between all levels.

There are three accessible entrances around the Don Mills Road and Sheppard Avenue intersection. Two of the entrances are on the northeast and southeast sides of Sheppard Avenue, respectively, and one automatic entrance in the parking garage at Fairview Mall near the Marshalls/HomeSense entrance.

Above the bus terminal, on the street level, is a multi-storey public parking lot with 366 parking spaces for commuters.

== Subway infrastructure in the vicinity ==
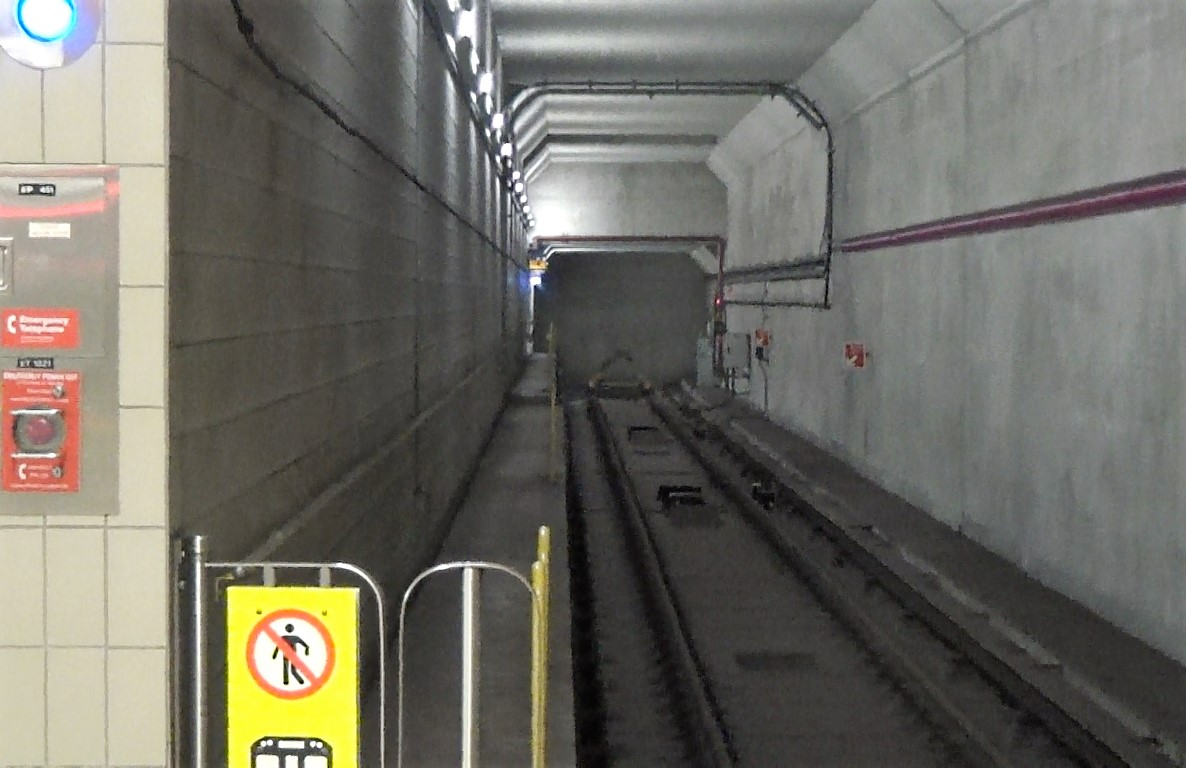
Don Mills station south side tail track

As this is a terminal station, there is a diamond crossover to the west of the platform for arriving trains to cross over to the westbound track, and for departing trains on the eastbound track to cross to the westbound track. There are also tail tracks beyond the east end of the platform. However, unlike other terminal stations where the tail tracks are at least as long as a standard six-car train for overnight storage, those at Don Mills are only about two cars in length. This is likely because storage capacity is available at Sheppard–Yonge station, which can store enough trains to service the line.

== Architecture and art ==
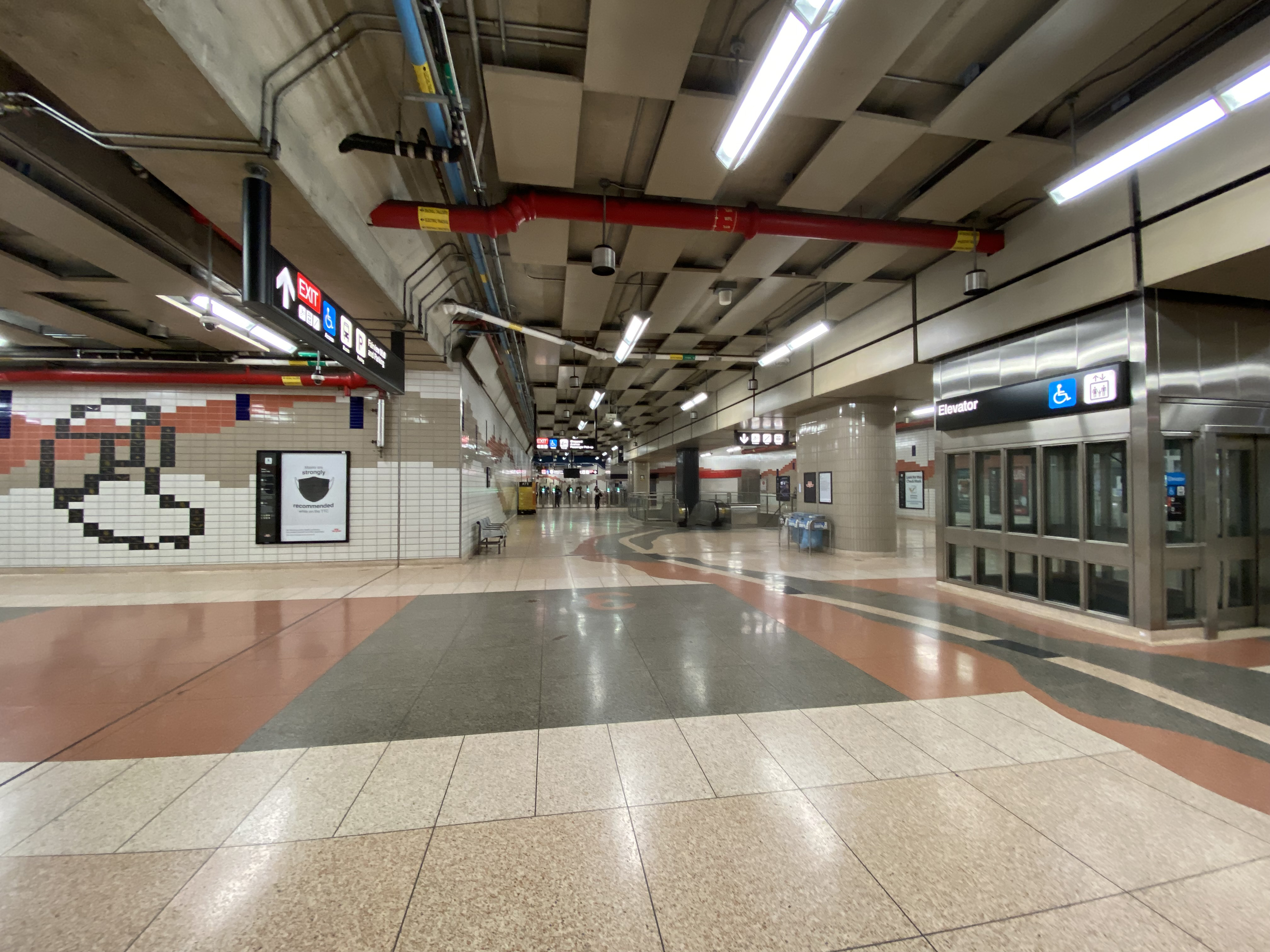
Tiles on the concourse level

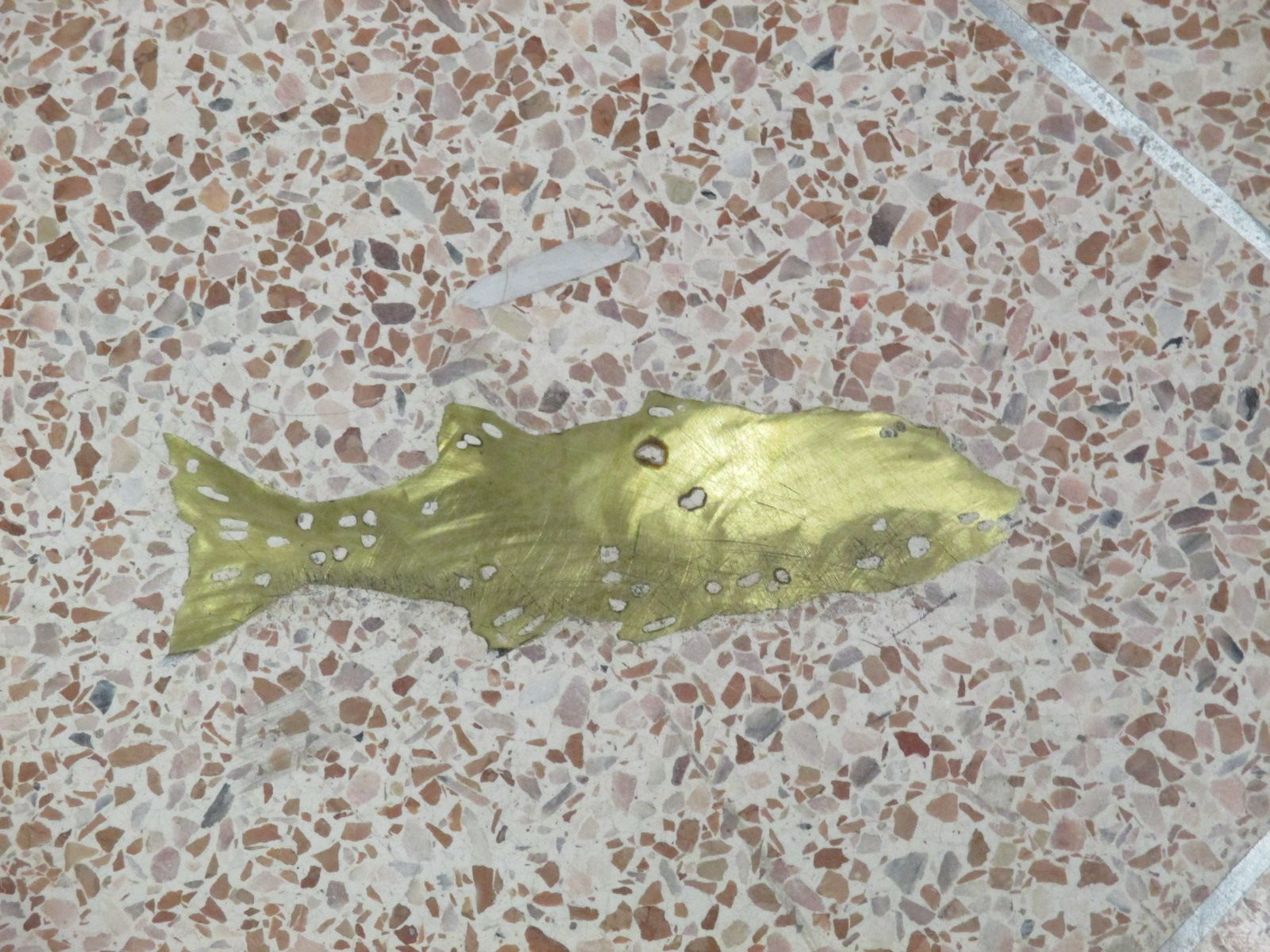
Inlay of a fossil fish embedded in the terrazzo floor

The station was designed by Stevens Group Architects, who also built Sheppard West and Bayview stations.

There are two pieces of public art in the station. The piece before/after spans the concourse and platform levels in the station. Created by Toronto artist Stephen Cruise, it consists of tile work on walls and inlays on the terrazzo floors:

- On the concourse level, the tilework on walls represents the geologic strata through which the line travels, plus graphical depictions of local flora and fauna.
- On the concourse and platform levels, bronze inlays in the floor depict fossils of fish, turtles, and leaves unearthed during the station's construction; the Sheppard line is also depicted in an abstract form on the floor.

Outside the station (on the north side of Don Mills Road, south of the bus entrance) is a tribute to Northern Dancer, a famous racehorse foaled at E. P. Taylor's Windfields Farm, which was then located on Bayview Avenue.

In 2021, to celebrate the TTC's 100th anniversary, a temporary art installation titled Sheppard Subway Construction was put on display at the station. Located on the concourse level, the installation consisted of various enlarged photographs showcasing the construction of Line 4 Sheppard.

== Surface connections ==
Don Mills station has a bus terminal that is also underground. It allows for connection to both TTC bus routes and York Region Transit (YRT) routes.

=== Toronto Transit Commission routes ===
When the subway is closed, passengers may board buses at the intersection of Don Mills Road and Sheppard Avenue outside the station.

Bay number	Route	Name	Additional information
1	Unloading only		
2	25A	Don Mills	Southbound to Pape station
2	25B	Don Mills	Southbound to Pape station
3	925	Don Mills Express	Southbound to Pape station
3	Wheel-Trans		
4	25A	Don Mills	Northbound to Steeles Avenue East
4	25C	Don Mills	Northbound to Steeles Avenue East
5	925	Don Mills Express	Northbound to Steeles Avenue East
6 & 7	Used by YRT buses (see section below)		
8	24B	Victoria Park	Southbound to Victoria Park station via Consumers Road (Rush hour and midday service)
9	167A	Pharmacy North	Northbound to Steeles Avenue East via Consumers Road
9	167B	Pharmacy North	Northbound to Steeles Avenue East (Rush hour service)
10	904	Sheppard–Kennedy Express	Eastbound to Kennedy station via Scarborough Centre station
10	985B	Sheppard East Express	Eastbound to Meadowvale Road (Rush hour service)
11	85A	Sheppard East	Eastbound to Rouge Hill GO Station
11	85B	Sheppard East	Eastbound to Meadowvale Road
11	85C	Sheppard East	Eastbound to Toronto Zoo
12	Unloading only		
13	10	Van Horne	Eastbound to Victoria Park Avenue (Rush hour service)
14	169A	Huntingwood	Eastbound to Scarborough Centre station via Van Horne Avenue
14	169B	Huntingwood	Eastbound to Scarborough Centre station (Rush hour service)
15	185	Sheppard Central	Westbound to Sheppard–Yonge station
N/A	325	Don Mills	Blue Night service; northbound to Steeles Avenue East and southbound to Commissioners Street (On-street transfer)
N/A	385	Sheppard East	Blue Night service; eastbound to Rouge Hill GO Station and westbound to Sheppard–Yonge station (On-street transfer)

=== York Region Transit routes ===
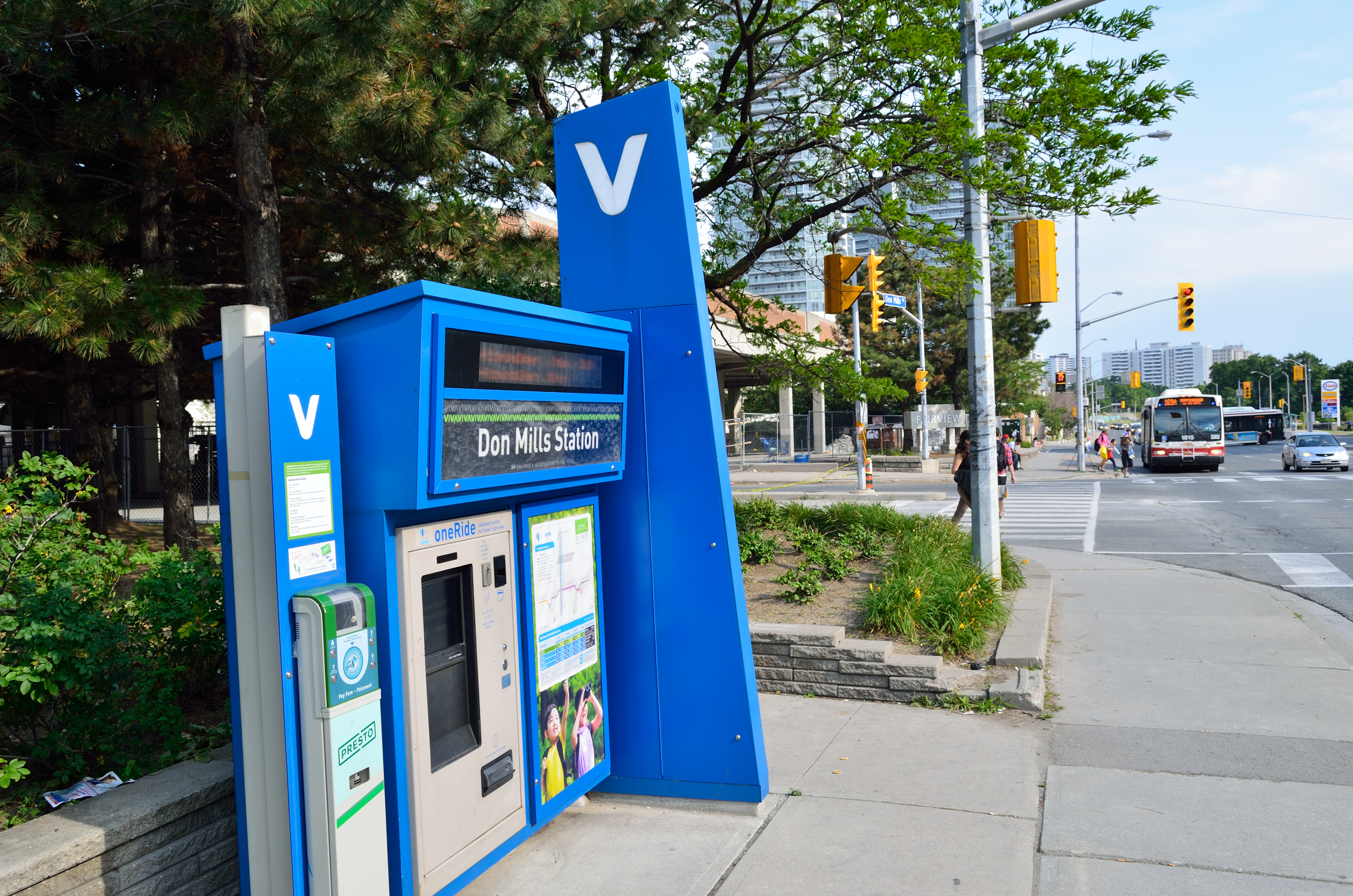
Vivastation (stop) for the defunct Viva Green line located outside the subway station (2014)

Several York Region Transit (YRT) bus routes also operate to and from Don Mills station. Under Ontario's One Fare Program that began on February 26, 2024, customers paying by credit, debit or Presto card can transfer between YRT and TTC services without incurring an additional fare within a two-hour transfer window. As free card transfers need to be recorded for reimbursements as well as to ensure double-fare payments are charged for riders ineligible for free transfers between YRT and TTC services, YRT buses drop off passengers outside of the station and pick up passengers inside the station and at on-street stops outside the station.

The subway station was formerly the southern terminus for the Viva Green line of YRT's Viva Rapid Transit until that service was temporarily suspended in 2020 due to the COVID-19 pandemic and discontinued permanently in 2023.

Route	Name	Additional information
24	Woodbine	To Honda Canada
90	Leslie	To John Birchall Road
90B	Leslie	To 16th Avenue via East Beaver Creek (AM); To Highway 7 via East Beaver Creek (PM)

== Prior proposals ==
As part of the Transit City plan, the TTC proposed the construction of the Sheppard LRT (light rail transit) line to connect Don Mills station to Sheppard East station on the proposed extension of Line 3 Scarborough. This replaced previous plans to extend Line 4 Sheppard to Scarborough Centre station on Line 3.

The Transit City plan included an LRT along Don Mills Road from Pape station on Line 2 Bloor–Danforth through Don Mills station to Steeles Avenue. However, the transit line, along with other Transit City lines, was cancelled by Rob Ford when he became mayor in December 2010.

In a 2015 study, one of the options for a proposed Toronto relief line connected to Don Mills Station.
