= Fairview Mall =

Shopping mall in Toronto

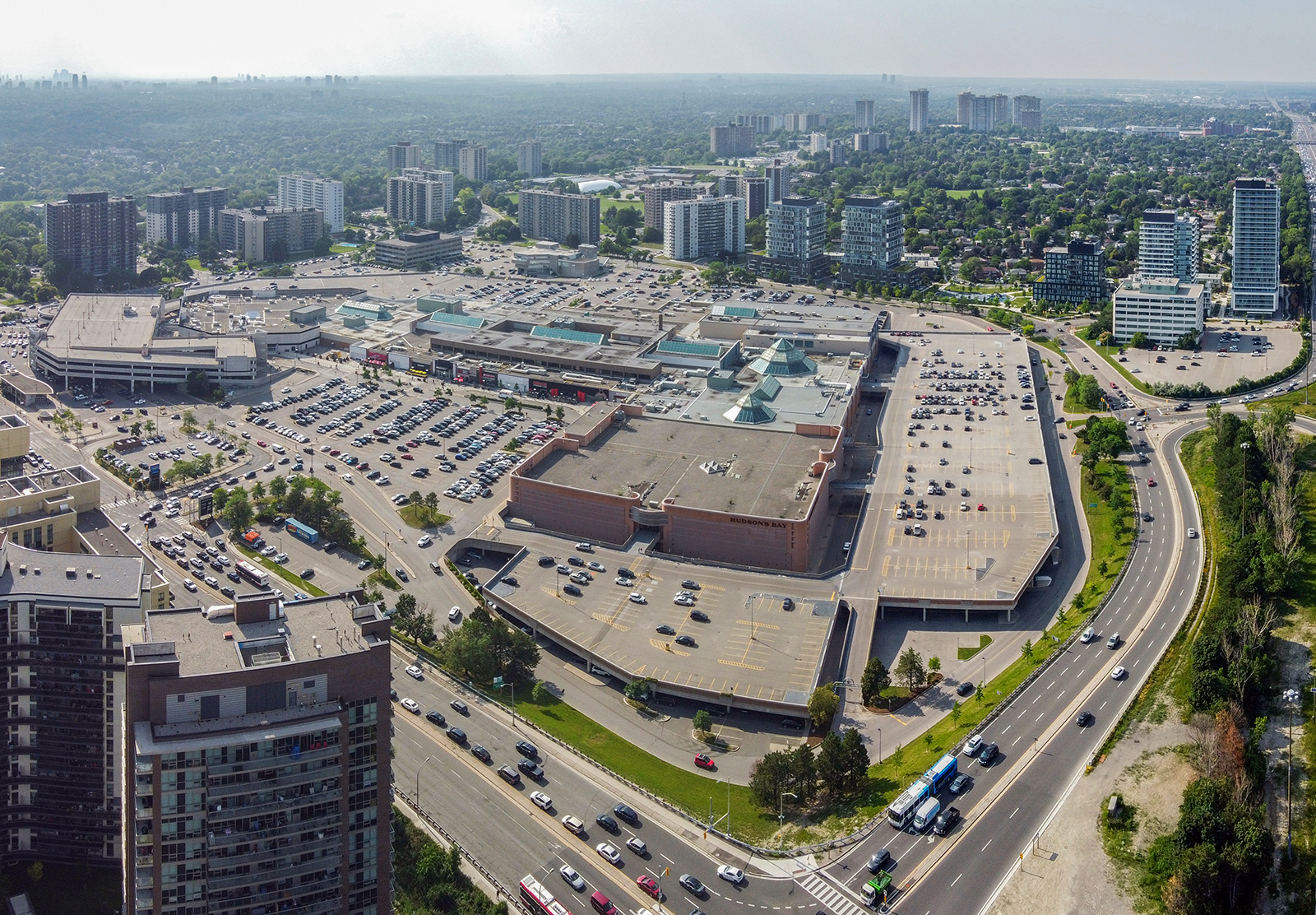
- Coordinates: 43°46′40″N 79°20′40″W
- Address: 1800 Sheppard Avenue East; Toronto, Ontario; M2J 5A7
- Opened: August 5, 1970; 56 years ago
- Developer: Fairview Corporation
- Manager: Cadillac Fairview
- Owner: Cadillac Fairview (50%); TD Greystone Asset Management funds (50%)
- Num. of stores: 190
- Num. of anchor tenants: 4
- Floor area: 881,287 sq ft (81,874 m^{2})
- Floors: 2 retail levels, plus 1 office and cinema level
- Public transit: Don Mills; Toronto Transit Commission Buses
- Website: shops.cadillacfairview.com/property/cf-fairview-mall

Fairview Mall (corporately designated CF Fairview Mall) is a large shopping centre in Toronto, Ontario, Canada, encompassing approximately 80,000 m^{2} (860,000 ft^{2}). Opened in 1970, the centre has over 180 stores, offices and a cinema complex. It is located several kilometres northeast of downtown, at the northeast corner of Don Mills Road and Sheppard Avenue East in the former city of North York.

== Description ==
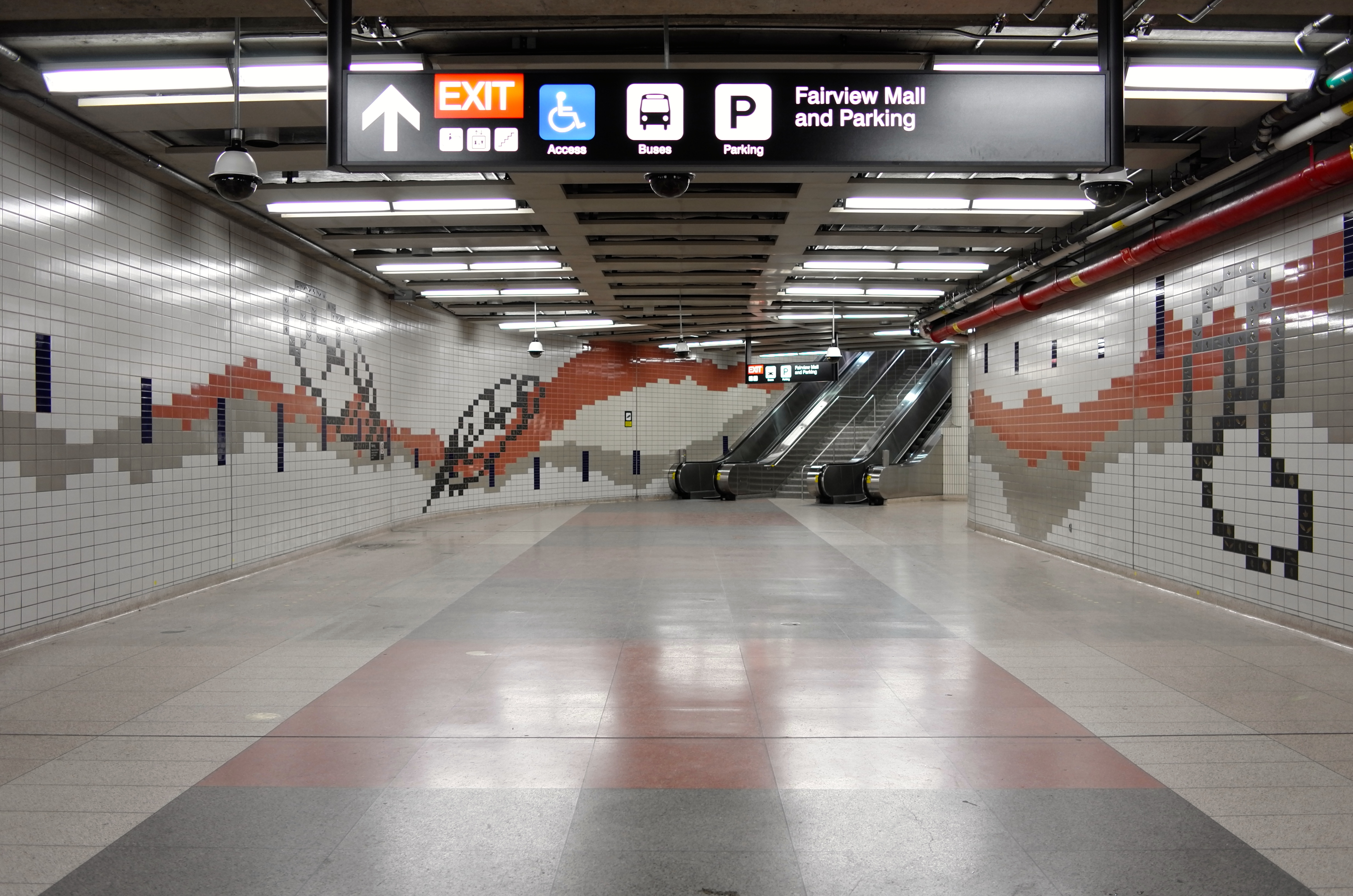
Interior walkway at Don Mills station, a subway station adjacent to Fairview Mall

The mall is on two levels east to west with a T&T Supermarket (formerly Sears) at the west end and the former Hudson's Bay at the east end. Its 170 stores include numerous clothing stores, speciality shops and kiosks. The mall also has a multiplex cinema, a food court and a few restaurants. The shopping centre also provides a personal style program that offers clients individual image consultations, personal shopping sessions, and other customized services for a fee.

The Toronto Public Library's Fairview Public Library branch is located just to the north of the mall. Next to the mall along Don Mills Road, there is a community health centre which includes a pharmacy, various doctors offices and dentist offices, and eye exam clinics.

Fairview Mall is located near the interchange of two major highways: Highway 401 and Highway 404/Don Valley Parkway. The mall is surrounded on all sides by parking lot and parking garages. Parking is free. The shopping centre is also served by a Toronto Transit Commission subway line and a York Region bus rapid transit line.

The mall is managed and 50% owned by Cadillac Fairview (CF). The other 50% is held by investment funds overseen by TD Greystone Asset Management, a division of The Toronto-Dominion Bank. Cadillac Fairview also owns and operates, among other malls, the similarly named Fairview Pointe-Claire in Pointe-Claire, Quebec.

== History ==
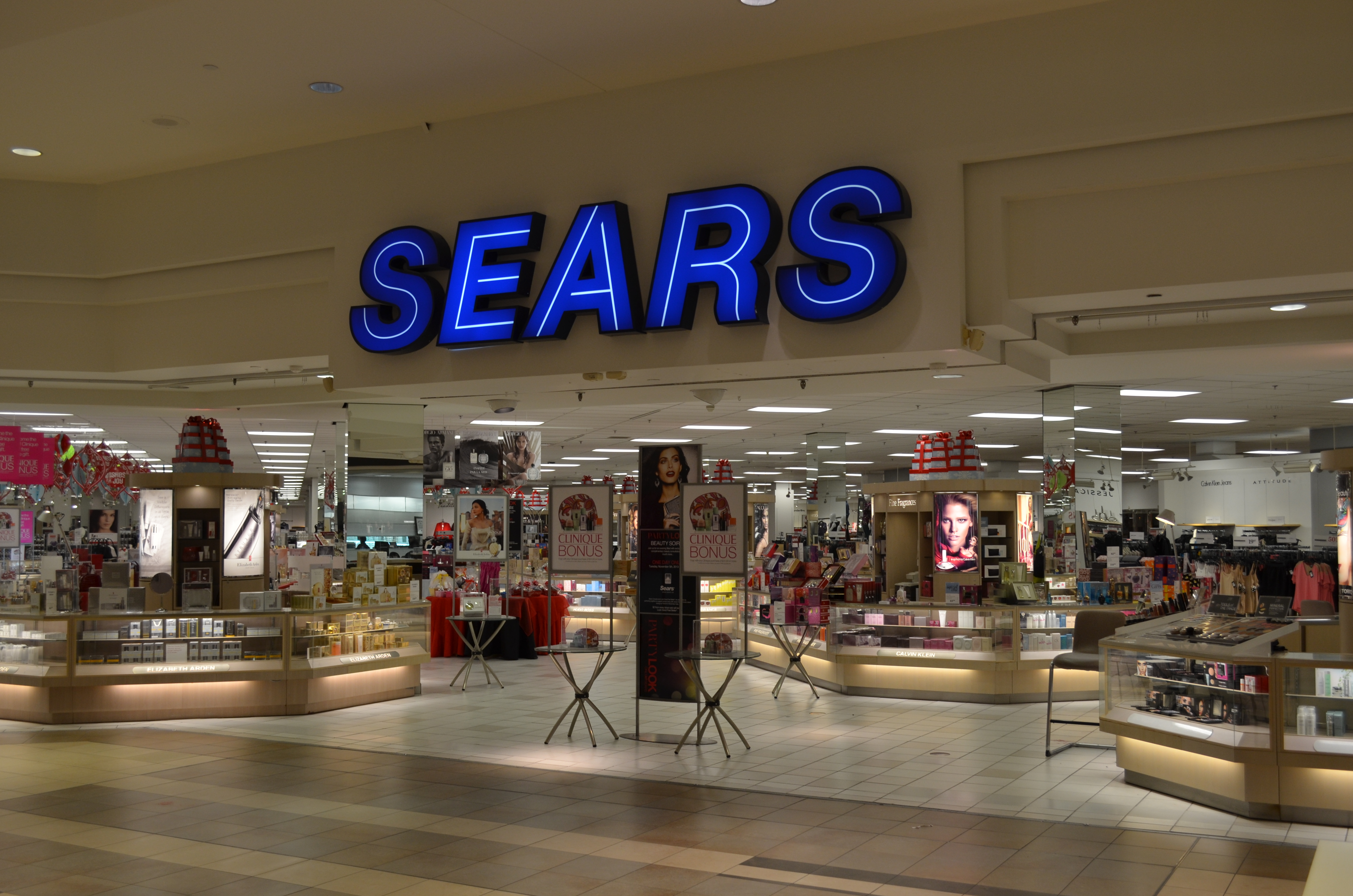
Sears Canada took over the retail space formerly occupied by Simpsons in 1991. Sears continued to operate in the mall until 2017. HomeSense and Marshalls currently operates on the upper level of the former department store, while T&T Supermarket and a variety of specialty stores operates in the newly developed bottom floor.

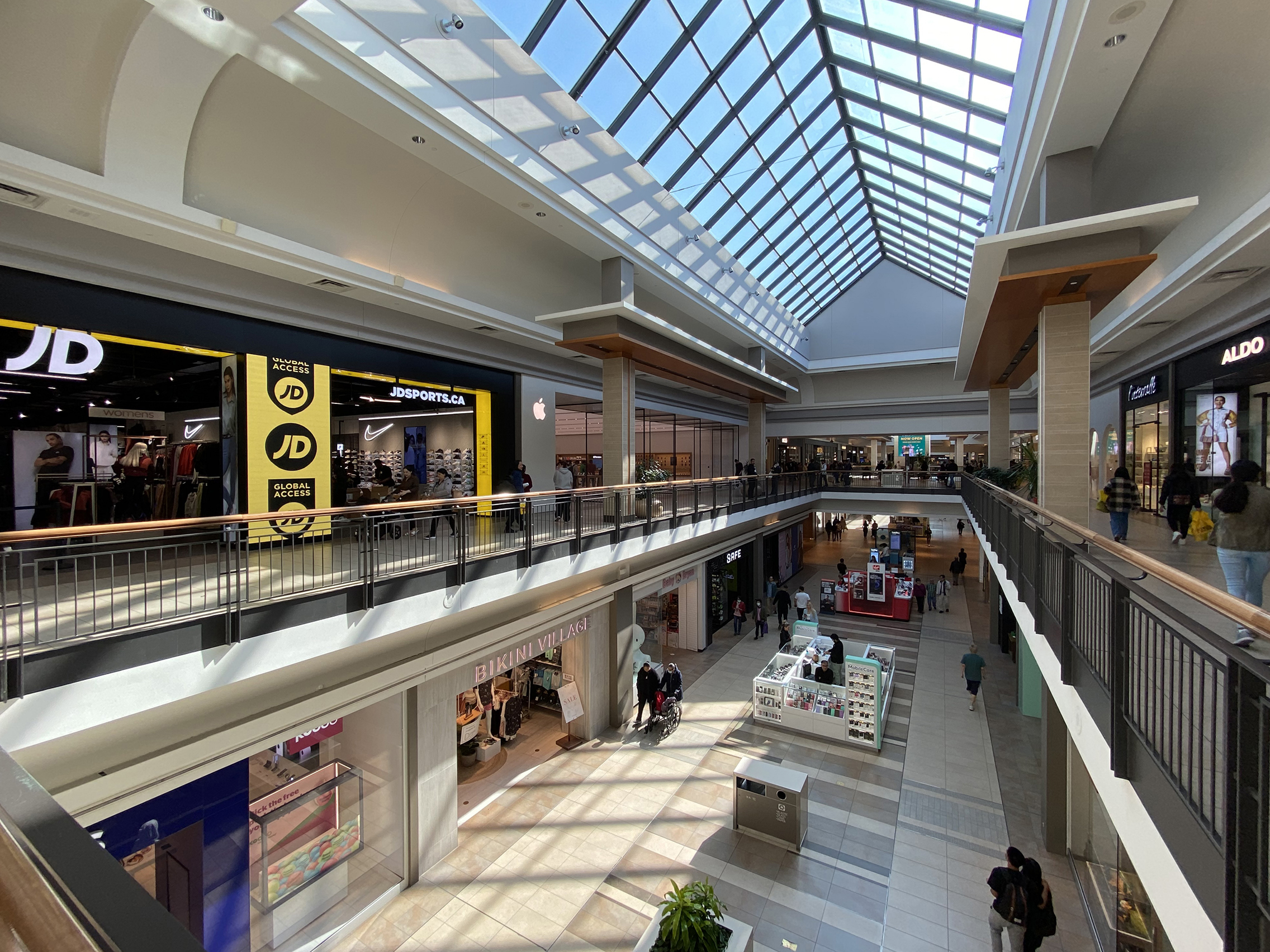
Interior of the mall in 2023

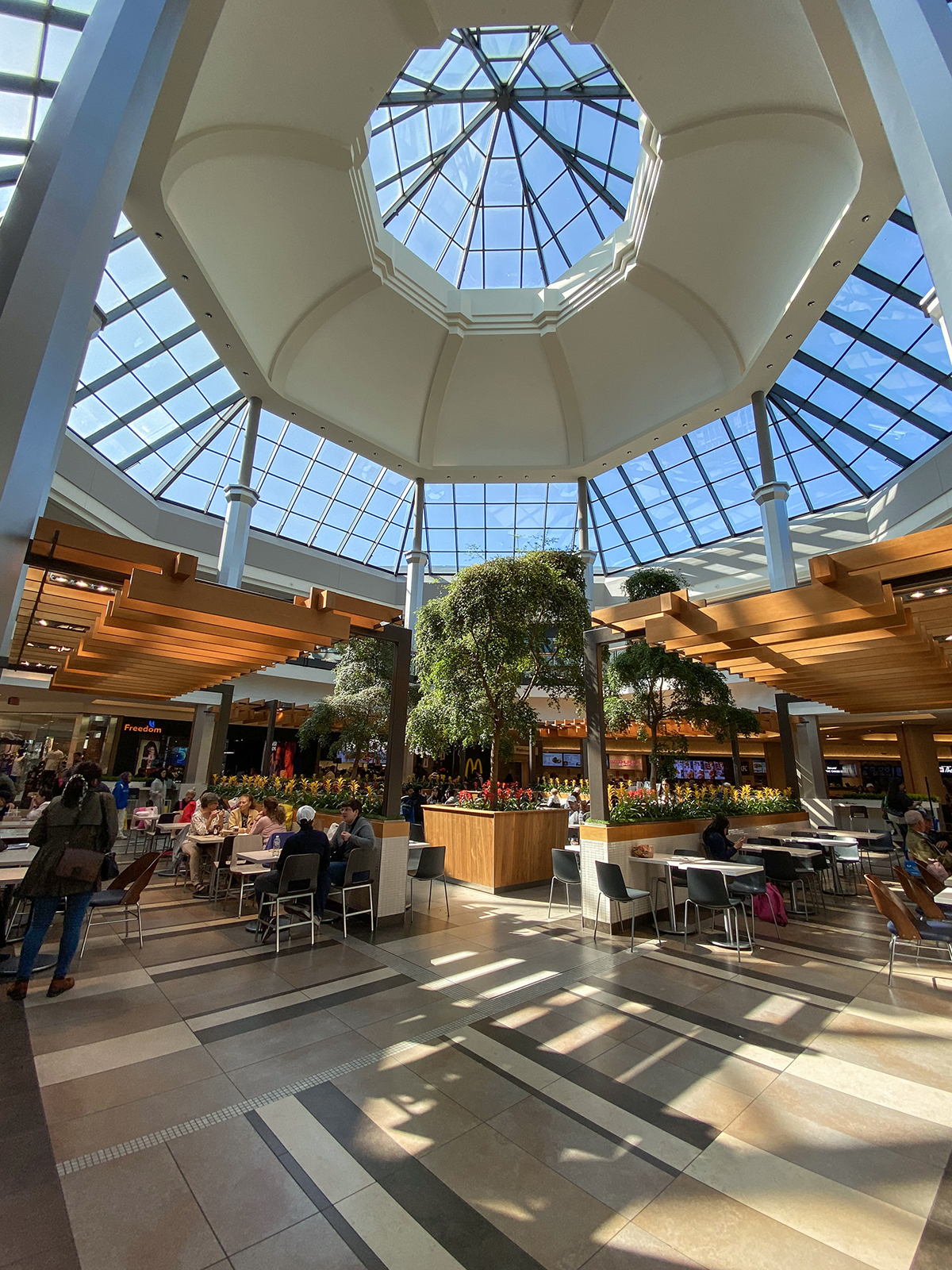
Food court skylight

Fairview Mall opened in 1970 with The Bay and Simpsons as its department store anchors. At the time, it was the fourth fully enclosed, as well as the first multi-level, shopping centre in Metropolitan Toronto. It consisted of 100 stores spread on two levels built at the cost CA$20 million.

From 1987 to 1989, the Cadillac Fairview Corporation and previous co-owner Markborough Properties spent CA$90 million to provide Fairview Mall's first major expansion. Renovations at that time included a glass-tiered ceiling, similar to Toronto's Eaton Centre, which opened much of its interior to natural lighting. The Bay and Simpsons both relocated in October and November 1987 respectively to new, larger spaces of 160,000 square feet each.

In 1991, the Hudson's Bay Company discontinued the Simpsons banner in favour of The Bay, in the process selling several duplicate locations, including its Simpsons store at Fairview Mall, to Sears Canada.

In 1997, mall co-owner Markborough Properties was acquired by Cambridge Shopping Centres from the Thomson family. Cambridge was acquired by Caisse de dépôt et placement du Québec subsidiary Ivanhoé between 1999 and 2001, forming Ivanhoé Cambridge.

In the late 1990s, a significant portion of the shopping centre's parking lot was redeveloped into a large bus terminal as part of the Toronto Transit Commission's (TTC's) Don Mills subway station (the eastern terminus of Toronto's new Sheppard subway line), which opened in 2002, and also as the southern terminus of York Region Transit's Viva Green bus rapid transit line.

In late 2008, Fairview Mall completed a CA$90 million (previously planned as $84 million) three-phase full renovation and redevelopment project, which had been started in July 2006. The redevelopment phases included an expanded Shoppers Drug Mart and a large format Liquor Control Board of Ontario (LCBO) store. The food court was moved to the lower level under a 60-foot (18 m) high skylight near The Bay. All entrances to the mall were updated to incorporate hands-free technology, and the common areas inside the centre were transformed with greater open spaces and wood finishes. Elevators serving the third-floor offices were added for the first time, located near entrance #4.

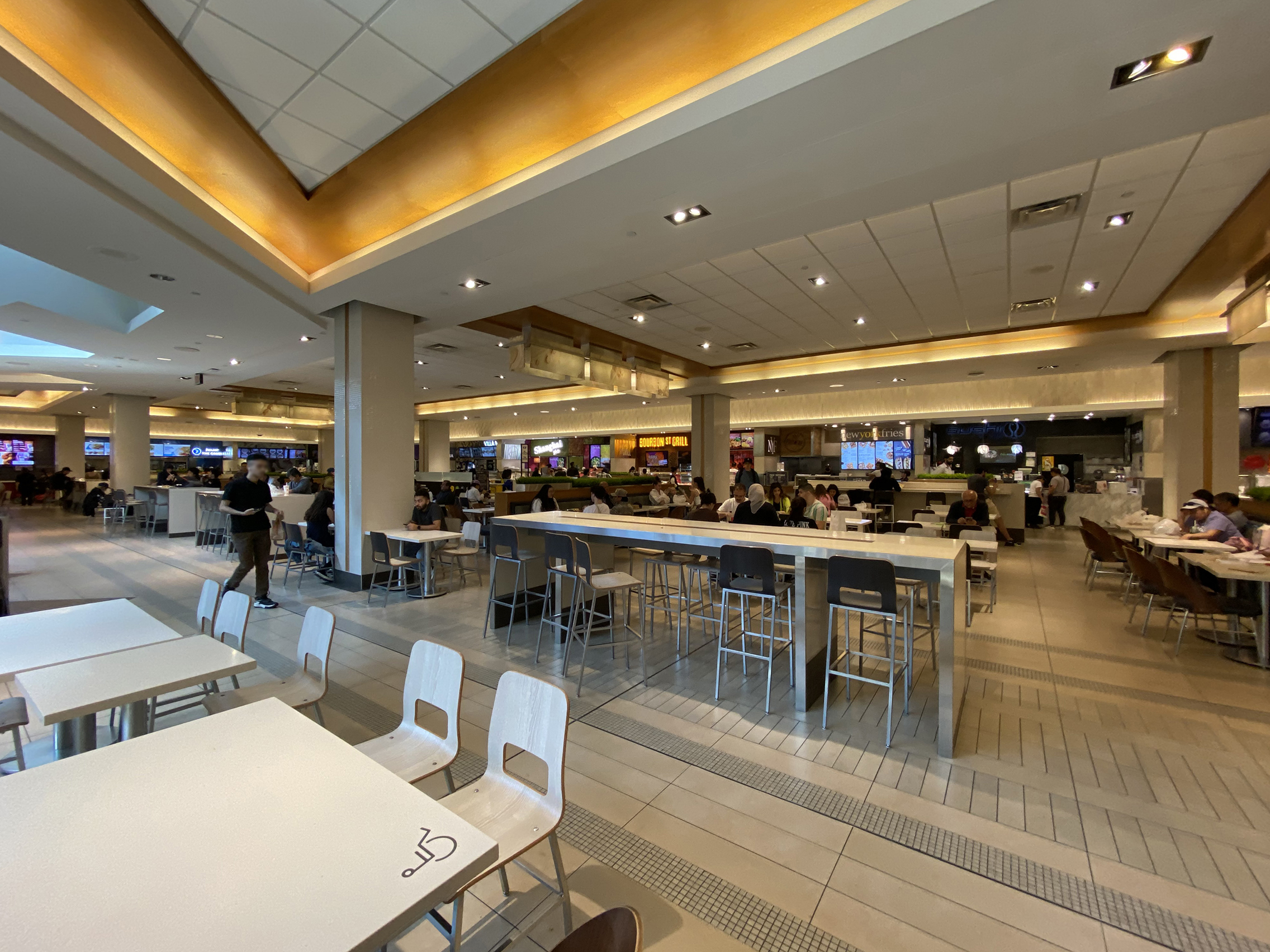
The food court of the mall after its renovations in 2009

In 2009, retailers Bath & Body Works, Forever 21, Sephora, Hollister Co., and Zara opened within the mall. The facade along Sheppard Avenue received a complete facelift by the end of 2009. During that time, work on Fairview Mall's new "dining experience" area was undertaken. The Rainbow Cinema had originally been an older style Cineplex theatre.

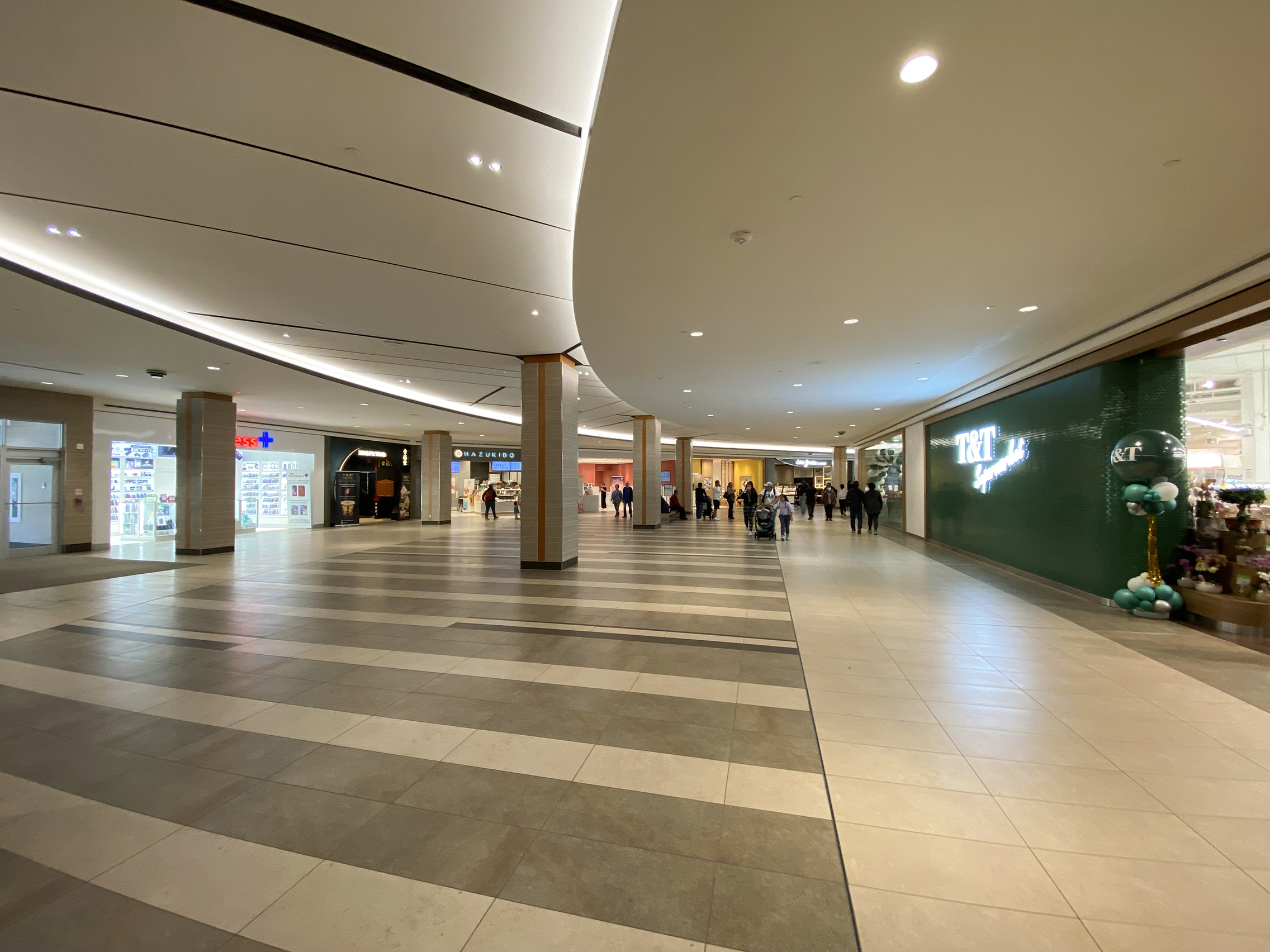
Lower level of former Sears store, which was replaced by several smaller retailers including T&T Supermarket

The Sears store closed in late 2017 as part of the liquidation of Sears' Canadian operations. On March 27, 2019, Cadillac Fairview announced the expansion of the mall that included adding a row of restaurants, a Sears box redevelopment, a renovation of the existing mall, and new pedestrian access to the TTC, which was completed in 2023. The T&T Supermarket, which is located on the lower level of the former Sears space, opened on May 18, 2023.

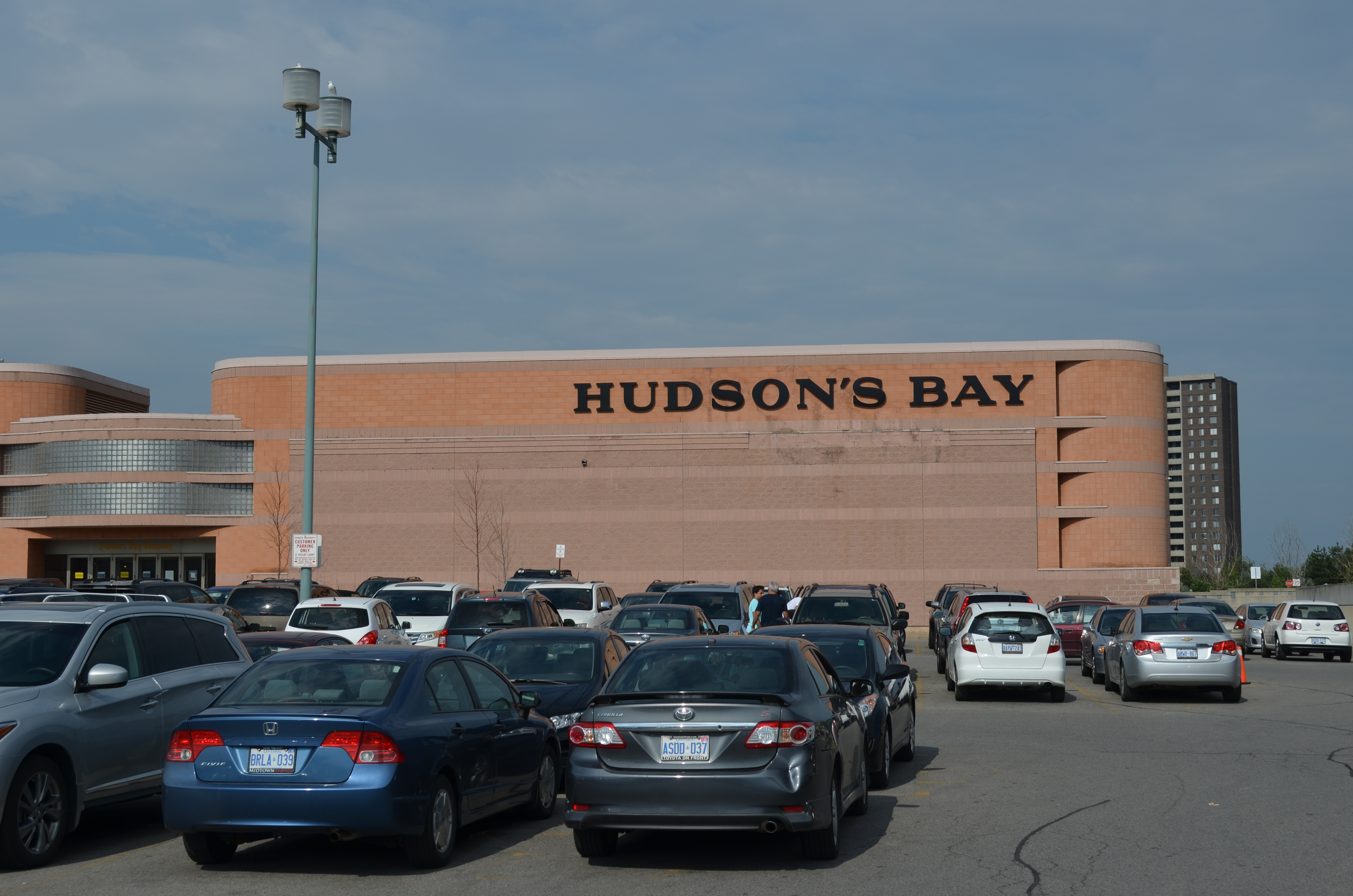
Hudson's Bay was a tenant of Fairview Mall since the mall's inception in 1970 and moved to a larger location in 1987. The store closed in 2025.

Ivanhoé Cambridge's 50% interest in the mall was purchased by 404 & Sheppard LP in 2018. It was later revealed that the entity was acting on behalf of investment funds overseen by TD Greystone Asset Management.

== Incidents ==
On 13 December 2006, three handguns, a machine gun, ammunition and drugs were found in a locker meant for shoppers to store their belongings in as they shopped.

On 25 June 2008, an 18-year-old was stabbed and seriously injured outside of a shoe store within the mall.

On 12 January 2009, a serial purse snatcher drove slightly into a woman, striking her leg. As the woman was checking out her injury, a man in the car grabbed her carry-all. The victim attempted to hold onto her purse as he drove away, dragging her for a short distance before she let go.

On 13 September 2010, a plainclothes mall security guard, Owen Baker, attempted to arrest a man for allegedly stealing a sample bottle of cologne, resulting in a foot-chase in which the security guard was shot at. Baker originally said he was looking down the barrel of the gun because it was pointed directly at his head, and that he dove into a jewellery store to dodge the bullet. Security camera footage contradicted his statements, and Baker later revised his story to say he didn't know which direction the gun was pointed and that he dropped to his knees as opposed to diving into a store. Once Baker regained his composure he got back up and continued chasing the suspect for the sample bottle of cologne. Toronto Police initially named Christopher Alexander and Shaun Mobeen as suspects. Mobeen turned himself in but was released after police cleared him of being the man in the video footage.

On 21 January 2014, an armoured truck transporting from the mall was robbed by two gunmen, leading to an exchange of gunfire. No one was injured, and the robbers made off with a bag of money containing $100,000.

On 13 November 2016, a car crashed into the mall, demolishing part of a wall. The driver was trapped in the debris, later being freed by emergency workers.

On 12 March 2017, a teenager was seriously wounded in a stabbing near the movie theatre.

On 24 March 2022, a Toronto Police officer accidentally shot himself in the hand and leg while in the parking lot of Fairview Mall.

On 9 July 2022, two people were shot at the mall and transported to a trauma centre in serious condition.

On 23 July 2022, two people were stabbed at the mall. Two separate groups of teens were robbed, with two teens being stabbed and rushed to an apartment building near Fairview Mall to treat their stab wounds, where they later called for paramedics. Toronto Police arrested a 15, 14 and 11-year old in connection to the robberies and stabbing.

On 26 May 2024, a woman was seriously injured in a stabbing and a suspect was apprehended at the scene.

== See also ==
- List of largest enclosed shopping malls in Canada
- List of shopping malls in Canada
- List of shopping malls in Toronto
