= Viva Green =

Former Viva bus rapid transit line

Overview
- System: YRT/Viva
- Operator: Tok Transit
- Vehicle: Van Hool A330
- Status: Cancelled
- Began service: October 16, 2005
- Ended service: April 5, 2020

Route
- Route type: Bus rapid transit
- Locale: York Region
- Communities served: Markham; Toronto
- Start: Don Mills
- End: McCowan & Highway 7
- Stops: 12

Service
- Frequency: 23 mins (rush hour only)

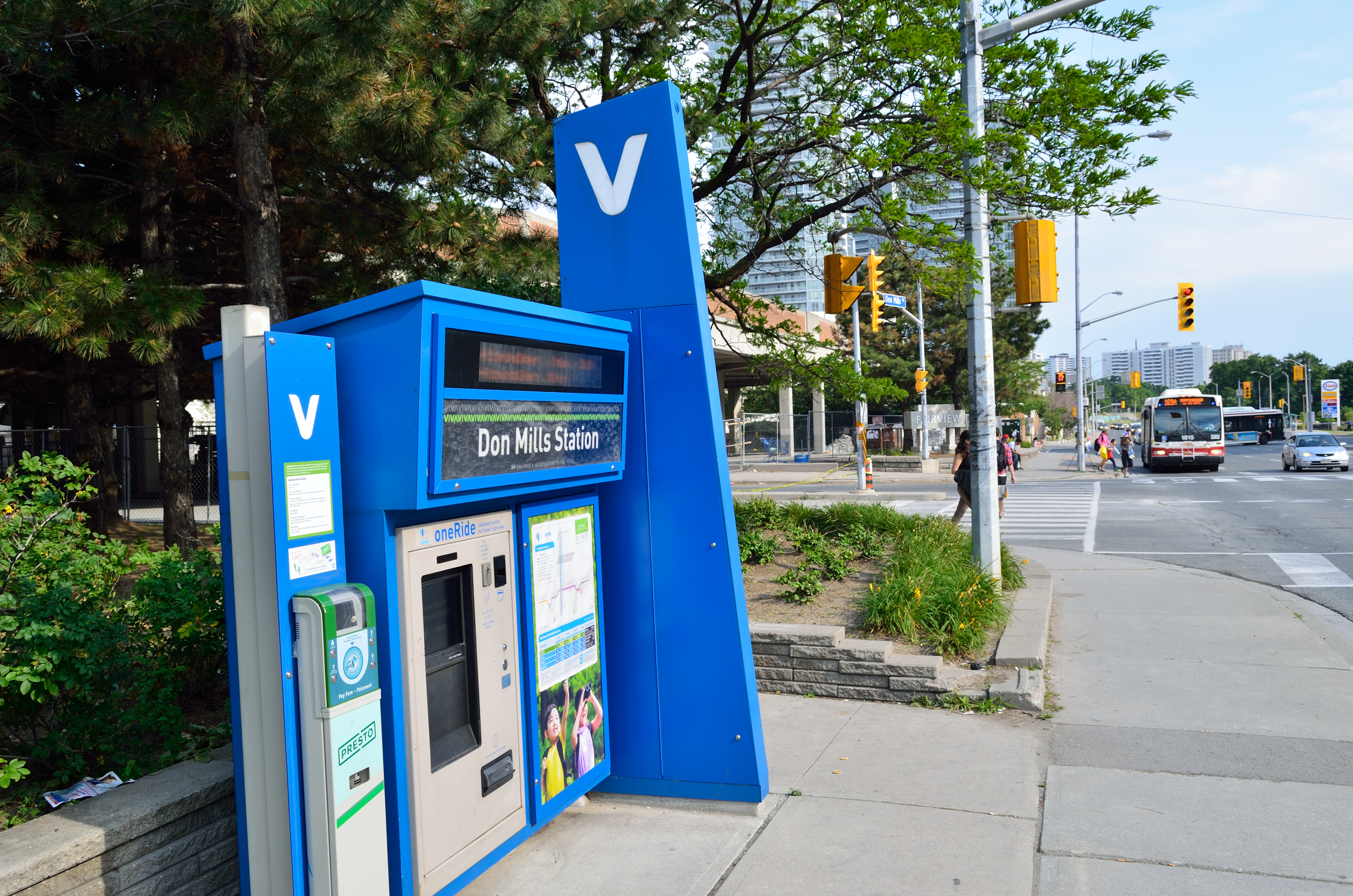
Former Vivastation (stop) on Don Mills Road at Don Mills station in Toronto in 2014

Viva Green was a Viva bus rapid transit route in York Region, north of Toronto, Ontario, Canada. It was operated by Tok Transit under contract from the Region of York.

Service on the Viva Green route was suspended on April 5, 2020, during the COVID-19 pandemic. On August 14, 2023, YRT announced that the route would not resume operation.

== Route description ==
Until its closure in 2020, the route had 12 stations. They were between Don Mills subway station in Toronto's North York district and McCowan Road in Markham. Viva Green operated during rush hour only and connected Viva Purple and Pink with Line 4 Sheppard. The route also served Unionville GO Station via the nearby Enterprise stop. Viva Green had three of its stops located in the City of Toronto, which was the most of any Viva bus rapid transit line.

Viva Green
Name	Opening date	City	Major connections
Don Mills	October 16, 2005	Toronto	Don Mills
Seneca Hill	October 16, 2005	Toronto	
McNicoll	October 16, 2005	Toronto	
Esna-Steeles	October 16, 2005	Markham	
Denison	October 16, 2005	Markham	
14th	October 16, 2005	Markham	
Warden	November 20, 2005	Markham	Viva Purple Viva Pink
Post Road	February 5, 2017	Markham	Viva Purple Viva Pink
Enterprise	November 20, 2005	Markham	Viva Purple Viva Pink
Kennedy	November 20, 2005	Markham	Viva Purple
Bullock	November 20, 2005	Markham	Viva Purple
McCowan	November 20, 2005	Markham	Viva Purple
