= List of shopping malls in Toronto =

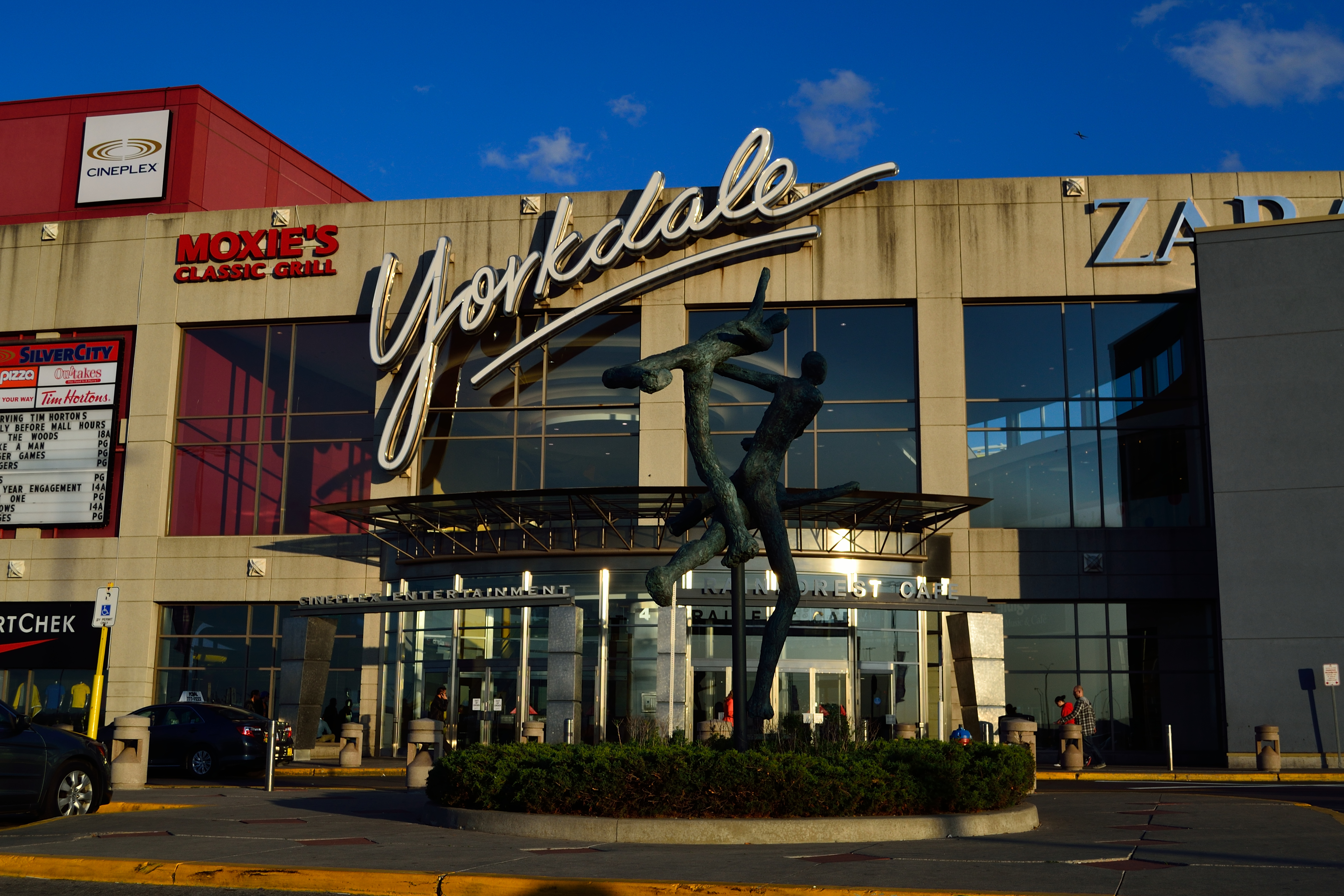
Opened in 1964, Yorkdale Shopping Centre was the first enclosed, automobile-centred shopping mall opened in Toronto.

Toronto has several shopping malls across the city, including five major destination malls that are among the largest and most profitable in Canada. The first enclosed shopping mall in Toronto was the Toronto Arcade in the downtown core. The first shopping mall of the enclosed, automobile-centred design type was Yorkdale Shopping Centre, which opened in 1964.

== Major shopping centres ==
Toronto's five major shopping centres each have over one hundred stores and are anchored by multiple department stores, international brands and luxury retailers. They are also the five largest malls in Toronto by floor space. Each provides thousands of automobile parking spaces. With the exceptions of Sherway Gardens and Scarborough Town Centre, all of these malls have direct pedestrian connections with the Toronto subway system, though Sherway Gardens has a bus terminal connecting Toronto Transit Commission and MiWay bus routes and Scarborough Town Centre was connected to Scarborough Centre station of Line 3 Scarborough until the line's permanent closure in July 2023, though the former station still has an active bus terminal. Yorkdale Shopping Centre is Toronto's first of its kind and was the world's largest shopping mall at the time of opening, while Toronto Eaton Centre is the most visited shopping mall in North America. These five malls were completed within a 13-year span in the 1960s and 1970s. The five malls are owned by either Cadillac Fairview or Oxford Properties, two of Canada's largest commercial real estate investment companies. A sixth major mall is planned by Cadillac Fairview in Toronto's planned East Harbour neighbourhood by the intersection of Don Valley Parkway and Gardiner Expressway / Lake Shore Boulevard and be also served by the planned East Harbour Transit Hub on the Ontario Line and GO Transit's Lakeshore East line.

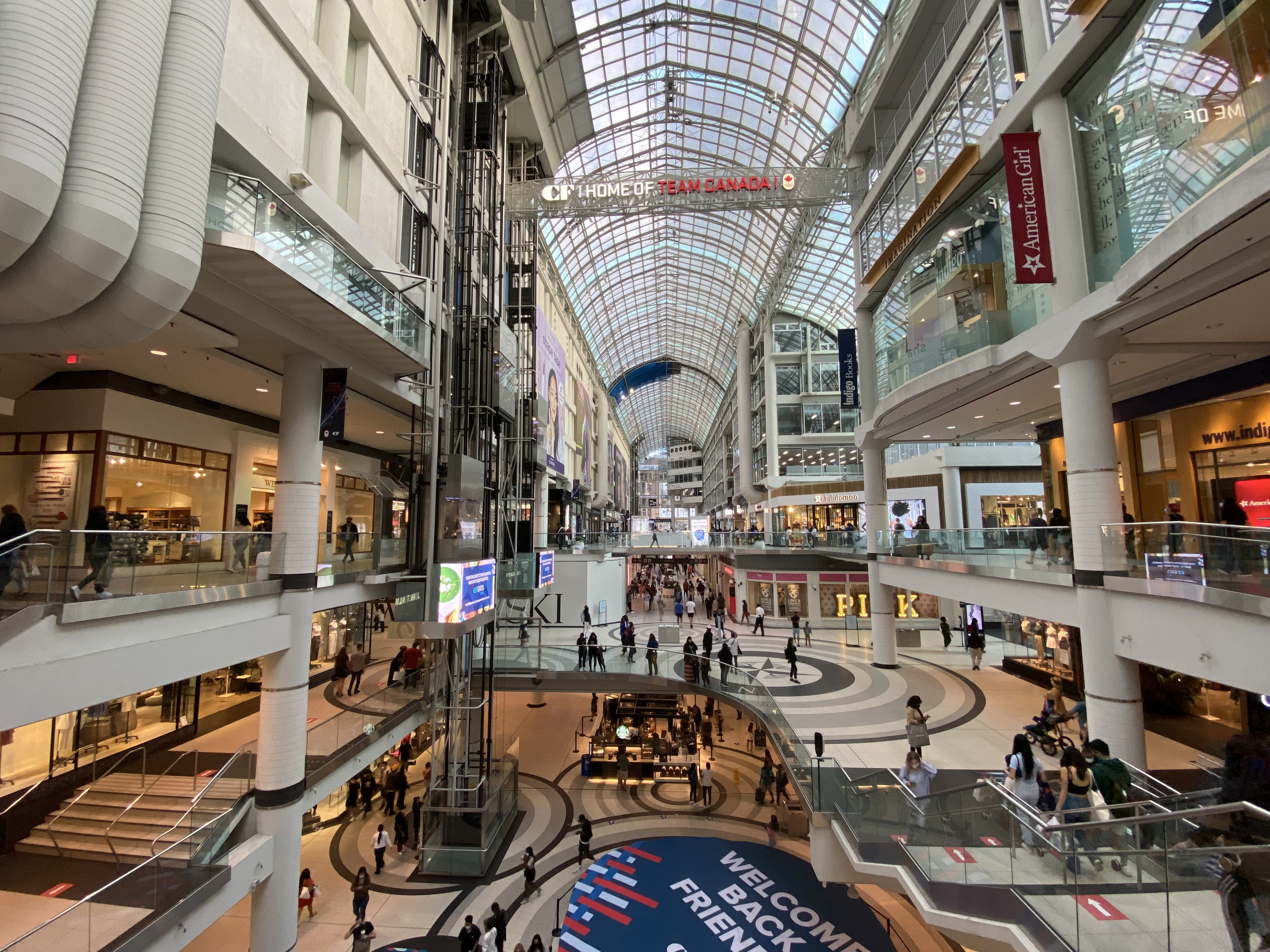
With over 160,000 square metres (1,722,000 sq ft) of retail space, Toronto Eaton Centre is the second-largest shopping centre in Toronto and the fifth largest in Canada.

Name	District	Major intersection	Direct subway connection	Developer/operator	Retail space	Year opened
Fairview Mall	North York	Don Mills Road—Sheppard Avenue	Don Mills	Cadillac Fairview	81,874 m^{2} (881,280 sq ft)	1970
Scarborough Town Centre	Scarborough	McCowan Road—Highway 401	Scarborough Centre (closed since July 2023)	Oxford Properties	121,467 m^{2} (1,307,460 sq ft)	1973
Sherway Gardens	Etobicoke	The Queensway—The West Mall		Cadillac Fairview	109,800 m^{2} (1,182,000 sq ft)	1971
Toronto Eaton Centre	Old Toronto	Yonge Street—Dundas Street; Yonge Street—Queen Street	TMU; Queen	Cadillac Fairview	159,979 m^{2} (1,722,000 sq ft)	1977
Yorkdale Shopping Centre	North York	Allen Road—Highway 401	Yorkdale	Oxford Properties	171,473 m^{2} (1,845,720 sq ft)	1964

== District or neighbourhood shopping centres ==
The district or neighbourhood level of shopping centres in Toronto are typically built around one or a few department stores or grocery supermarkets and are enclosed. These shopping centres typically provide a surrounding free parking lot. Most of these are located in the suburbs of Toronto, where land was available for parking. There are only two shopping malls of this type within Toronto's pre-1998 city limits: Dufferin Mall (on Dufferin Street south of Bloor Street and north of College Street) and Gerrard Square (on Gerrard Street East east of Pape Avenue and west of Jones Avenue). The third shopping mall in Old Toronto, Galleria Shopping Centre (at Dufferin Street and Dupont Street), was demolished in January 2020 and is replaced with condominium developments. There are a few ethnic malls of this type as well. Woodbine Mall has Fantasy Fair, a small year-round indoor amusement park primarily for young children.

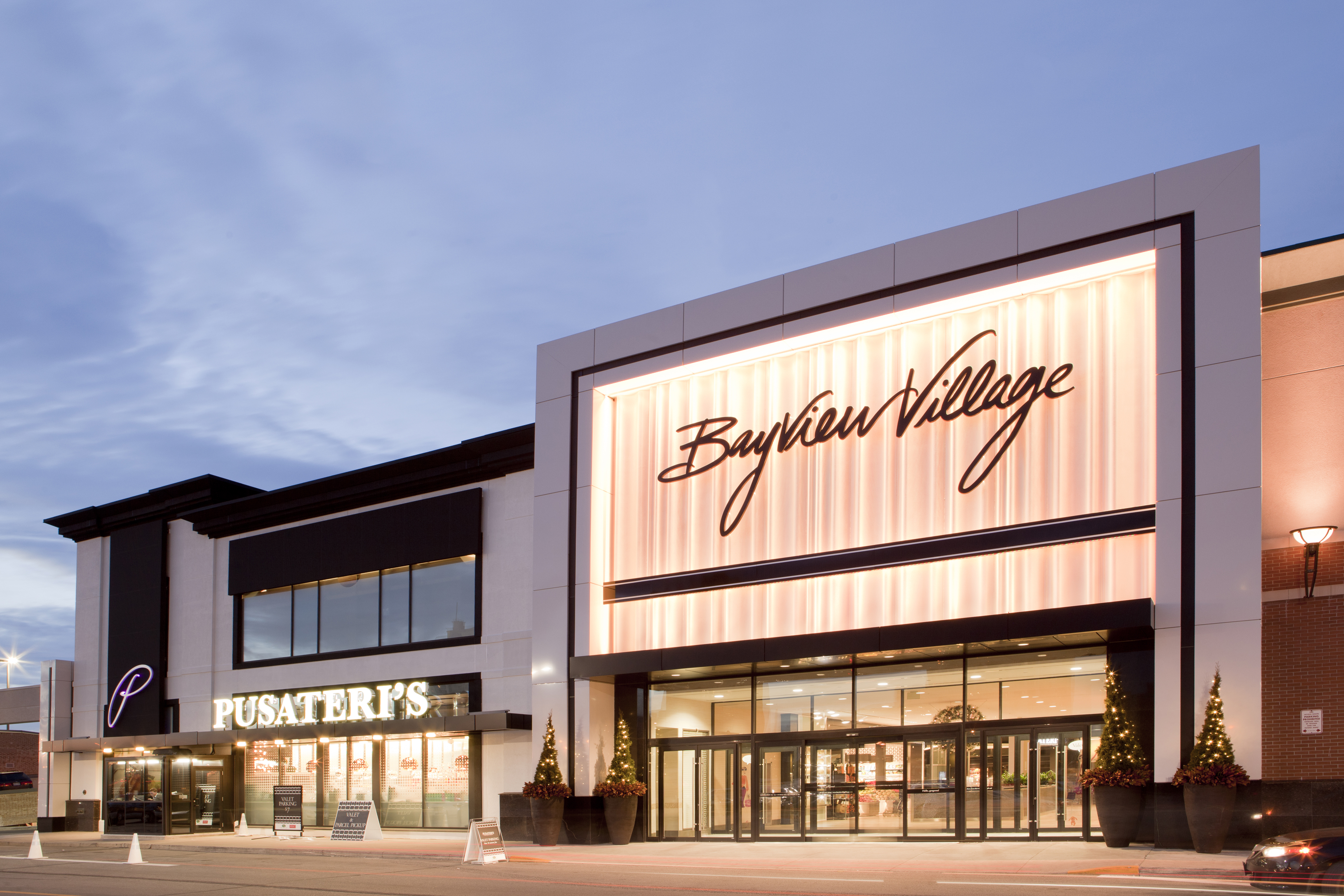
Bayview Village Shopping Centre is a shopping centre built in suburban Toronto, built between Bayview Village and Willowdale neighbourhoods.

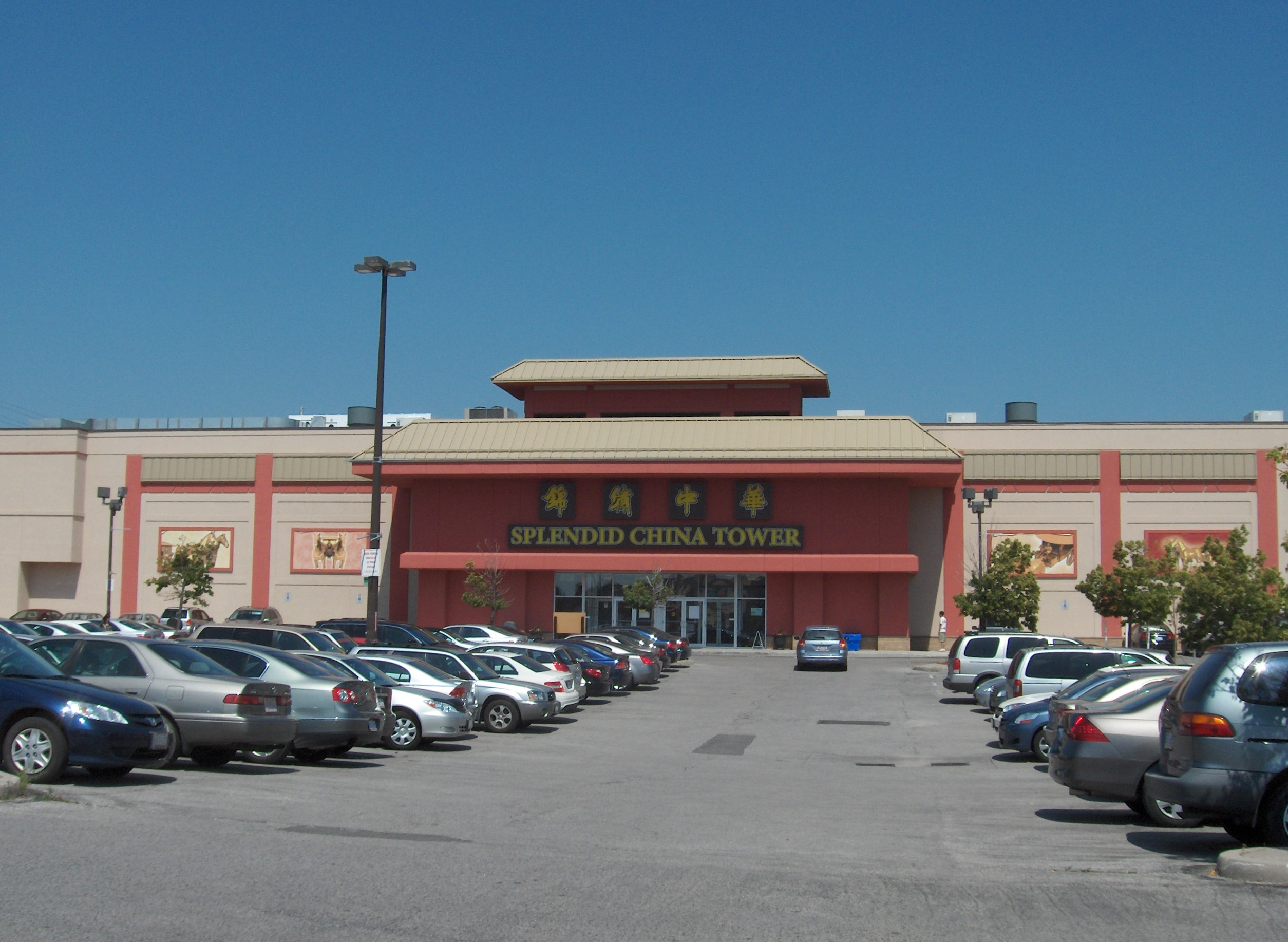
Splendid China Mall (formerly known as Splendid China Tower) is a Chinese-themed ethnic suburban shopping centre located in the Milliken neighbourhood. The mall is across city limits at Steeles Avenue from another Chinese-themed ethnic shopping centre, Pacific Mall, in Markham.

- Agincourt Mall (Kennedy Road and Sheppard Avenue East), Scarborough
- Albion Centre (Finch Avenue West and Kipling Avenue), Etobicoke
- Bayview Village Shopping Centre (Bayview Avenue and Sheppard Avenue East), North York
- Bridlewood Mall (Warden Avenue and Finch Avenue East), Scarborough
- Cedarbrae Mall (Lawrence Avenue East and Markham Road), Scarborough
- Centerpoint Mall (Yonge Street and Steeles Avenue West), North York
- Cloverdale Mall (Dundas Street West and The East Mall), Etobicoke
- Dufferin Mall (Dufferin Street, south of Bloor Street West and north of College Street), Old Toronto
- East York Town Centre (Millwood Road and Overlea Boulevard), East York
- Eglinton Square (Eglinton Avenue East and Victoria Park Avenue), Scarborough
- Gerrard Square (Gerrard Street East and Pape Avenue), Old Toronto
- Jane-Finch Mall (southeast corner of Jane and Finch), North York
- Kipling-Queensway Mall (Kipling Avenue and the Queensway), Etobicoke
- Lawrence Allen Centre (formerly Lawrence Square Shopping Centre; renamed in late 2019) (Allen Road and Lawrence Avenue West), North York
- Malvern Town Centre (Neilson Road and Tapscott Road), Scarborough
- North York Sheridan Mall (Jane Street and Wilson Avenue), North York
- Parkway Mall (Victoria Park Avenue and Ellesmere Road), Scarborough
- Woodbine Mall (Rexdale Boulevard and Highway 27), Etobicoke
- Woodside Square (McCowan Road and Finch Avenue East), Scarborough
- Yorkgate Mall (northwest corner of Jane and Finch)

=== Ethnic malls ===
- Dragon Centre (Sheppard Avenue East and Glen Watford Drive), Scarborough
- Majestic City (Markham Road and McNicoll Avenue), Scarborough; North America's largest South Asian indoor mall
- Splendid China Mall (Steeles Avenue east of Kennedy Road), Scarborough; converted from Canadian Tire

== Malls located within major office buildings and condominium towers ==
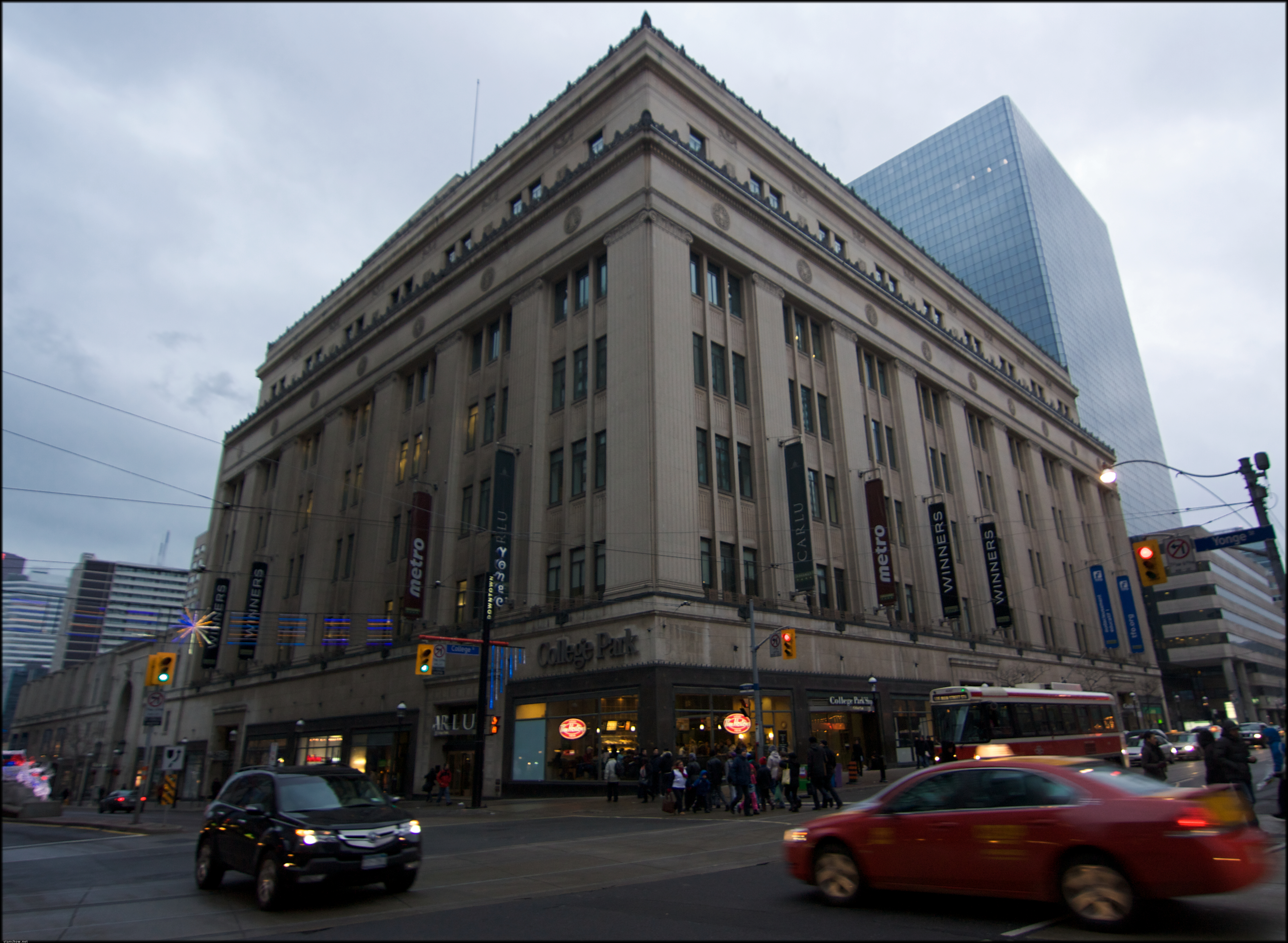
College Park is one of several buildings in Toronto that is used as an office complex and a shopping centre.

One configuration of shopping mall in Toronto is the self-contained type located within a commercial office building, sometimes around a central atrium. This type typically does not provide a surrounding parking lot. These malls typically house from a dozen to several dozen stores. Most of these are connected to a station of the Toronto subway system. In the case of the Hudson's Bay Centre, the mall connects the former department store to the Toronto subway system at Bloor–Yonge station. Some of these malls can be located in the taller condominium towers. These malls are located in the core (Old Toronto), unless marked otherwise:

- The Atrium on Bay (Dundas Street West and Yonge Street)
- Aura (Yonge Street and Gerrard Street); mixed-use with retail on the first four floors and the first basement
- Canada Square (Yonge Street and Eglinton Avenue West)
- Chinatown Centre (Chinatown); ethnic mall
- College Park (Yonge Street and College Street)
- The Crossways (Bloor Street West and Dundas Street West in Old Toronto)
- Cumberland Terrace (Bay Street and Bloor Street West)
- Dragon City (Chinatown) (Dundas Street West and Spadina Avenue); ethnic mall
- Dynasty Centre (Sheppard Avenue East and Midland Avenue), Scarborough; ethnic mall
- Empress Walk (Empress Avenue and Yonge Street), North York
- Holt Renfrew Centre (Bloor Street West and Bay Street)
- Hudson's Bay Centre (Bloor Street West and Yonge Street)
- Manulife Centre (Bloor Street West and Bay Street)
- Queen's Quay Terminal (Queen's Quay West and York Street)
- Sheppard Centre (Sheppard Avenue East and Yonge Street), North York
- The Well (Spadina Avenue and Front Street)
- Yonge Eglinton Centre (Yonge Street and Eglinton Avenue West)
- York Mills Centre (York Mills Road and Yonge Street), North York
- Yorkville Village (formerly Hazelton Lanes) (Avenue Road and Yorkville Avenue north of Bloor Street West)

=== Path underground shopping complex ===
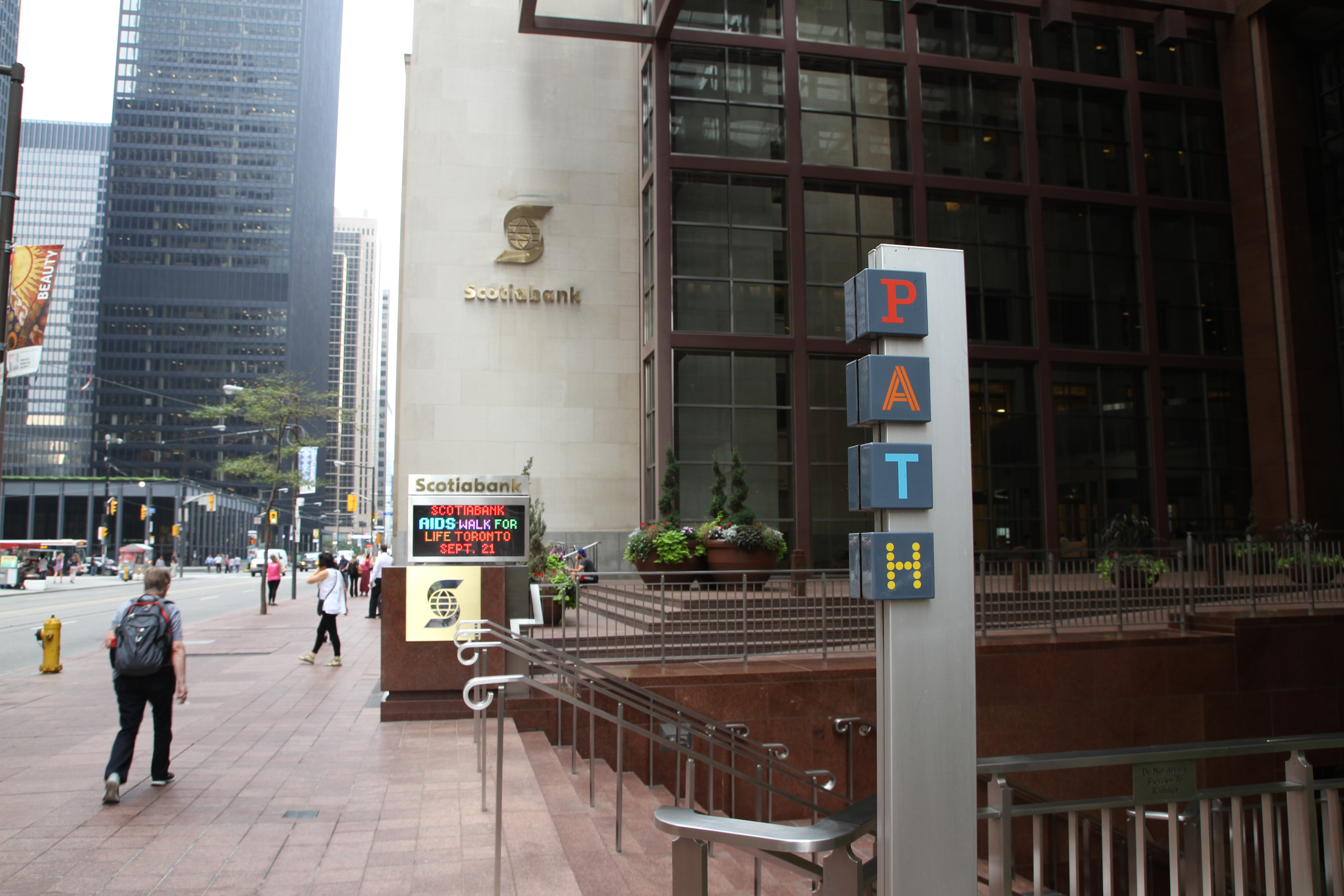
Signage for the Path from Scotia Plaza in 2014. The Path connects most of downtown and is the world's largest underground shopping complex, according to Guinness World Records.

In Downtown Toronto, primarily in the Financial District, there are interconnected shopping malls located at least one flight of stairs underground. The complex as a whole is named 'Path'. The Toronto Eaton Centre (see above) is a part of the complex. The complex has 1,200 stores, and according to Guinness World Records, the Path is the largest underground shopping complex in the world, with 371,600 m^{2} (4,000,000 sq ft) of retail space.

- Bay Adelaide Centre (Bay Street and Adelaide Street West)
- Brookfield Place (bounded by Front Street West, Bay Street, Wellington Street West, and Yonge Street)
- Commerce Court (Yonge Street and King Street West)
- First Canadian Place (Bay Street and King Street West)
- Metro Hall (John Street and King Street West)
- Royal Bank Plaza (Bay Street and Front Street West)
- Scotia Plaza (King Street West and Yonge Street)
- Sheraton Centre (Queen Street West and York Street)
- Simcoe Place (Front Street West and Simcoe Street)
- Toronto-Dominion Centre (bounded by King Street West, Bay Street, Wellington Street West, and York Street)
- Union Station (Bay Street and Front Street West)

== Open-air shopping plazas ==
Open-air shopping plazas are larger collections of stores built with surrounding parking areas, with parking spaces separated from the storefronts by sidewalks. These shopping centres generally serve the local surrounding area and have a large proportion of family-run businesses, some of which serve ethnic communities.

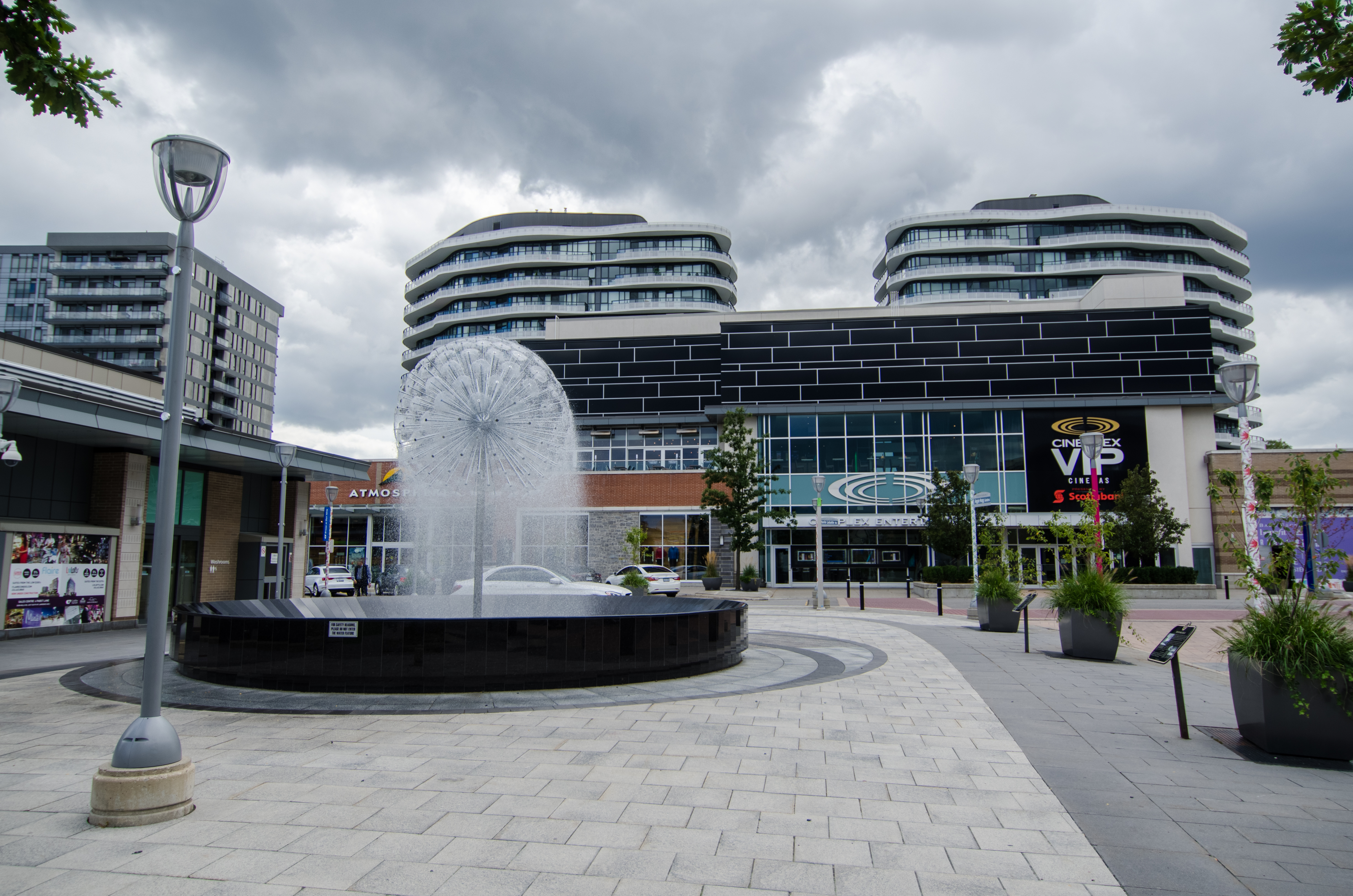
Shops at Don Mills is one of several open-air malls in Toronto. It replaced an enclosed shopping mall, Don Mills Centre, which closed in 2006.

- Bamburgh Gardens (Warden Avenue and Bamburgh Circle), Scarborough
- Chartwell Plaza (Brimley Road and Huntingwood Drive), Scarborough
- Dufferin & Steeles Plaza, North York
- Iranian Plaza (Yonge Street between Cummer Avenue and Steeles Avenue), North York; ethnic plaza
- The Landmark (Steeles Avenue and Middlefield Road), Scarborough; ethnic plaza
- Lawrence Plaza (Bathurst Street and Lawrence Avenue West), North York
- Milliken Wells Plaza (McCowan Road and Alton Towers Circle), Scarborough
- Peanut Plaza (Don Mills Road and Van Horne Avenue), North York
- Sheppard Plaza (Sheppard Avenue West and Bathurst Street), North York
- Shops at Don Mills (Don Mills Road and Lawrence Avenue East), North York
- Tam O'Shanter Plaza (Sheppard Avenue East east of Kennedy Road), Scarborough
- Unnamed plaza owned by State (Dufferin Street between Castlefield Avenue and the former York–North York boundary), York
- Victoria Terrace (Victoria Park Avenue and Lawrence Avenue East), North York
- Whiteshield Plaza (Kennedy Road and Lawrence Avenue East), Scarborough
- York Mills Gardens (Leslie Street and York Mills Road), North York

== Power centres ==
Power centres mainly consist of major national and international big-box stores with large amounts of parking space separate from the stores themselves. They also serve a larger area than the open-air shopping plazas do.

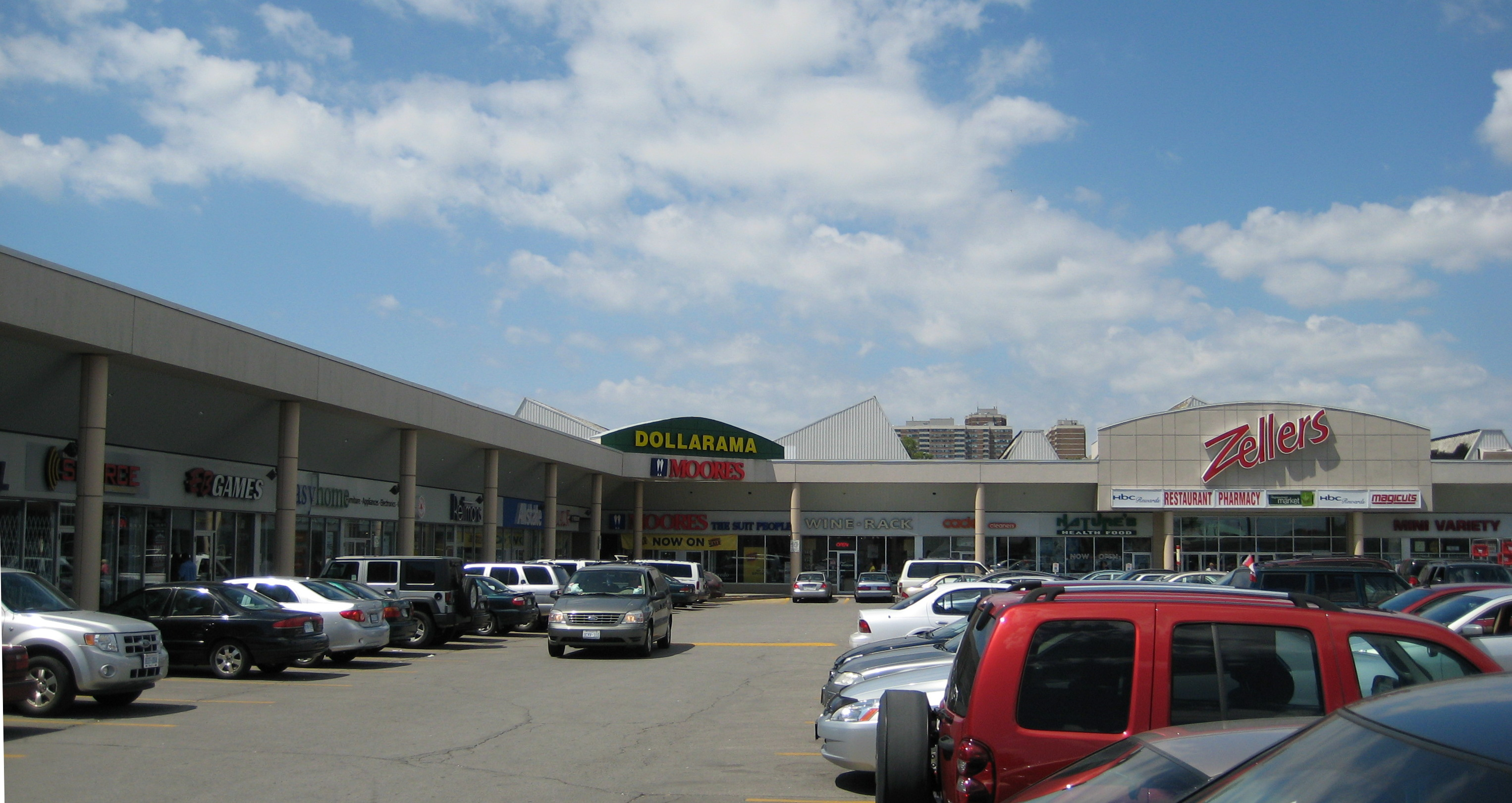
As seen in 2009, Shoppers World Danforth is an example of an early power centre, one of several in the city.

- Black Creek Super Value Centre (Rogers Road and Keele Street), York
- Crossroads (Weston Road and Highway 401), North York
- Downsview Power Centre (unofficial name) (Dufferin Street and Wilson Avenue), North York
- Dufferin and Steeles Power Centre (unofficial name) (Dufferin Street and Steeles Avenue), North York
- Golden Mile (Eglinton Avenue East between Victoria Park Avenue and Birchmount Road; consists of multiple adjacent power centres), Scarborough
- Kennedy Commons (Kennedy Road and Highway 401), Scarborough
- Leaside Centre (Eglinton Avenue East and Laird Drive), East York
- Queenswalk Centre (North Queen Street and Queensway), Etobicoke
- Queensway Complex (Islington Avenue and Queensway), Etobicoke
- Shoppers World Danforth (Danforth Avenue west of Victoria Park Avenue), East York
- Stock Yards Village (Weston Road and St. Clair Avenue West), Old Toronto

== Flea markets ==
The markets are housed indoors with stalls of independent vendors.

- Downsview Park Merchant's Market, Downsview Park (Keele Street and Sheppard Avenue West), North York
- Dr. Flea's, Highway 27 and Albion Road, Etobicoke
- Jane Finch Flea Market, 1911 Finch Avenue West (Jane Street and Finch Avenue West), North York
- Merchant's Flea Market, 1921 Eglinton Avenue East (Warden Avenue and Eglinton Avenue East), Scarborough

== Former shopping malls ==
The following shopping malls have been demolished or closed. Some have been replaced by new strip plazas or re-developed for non-retail uses:

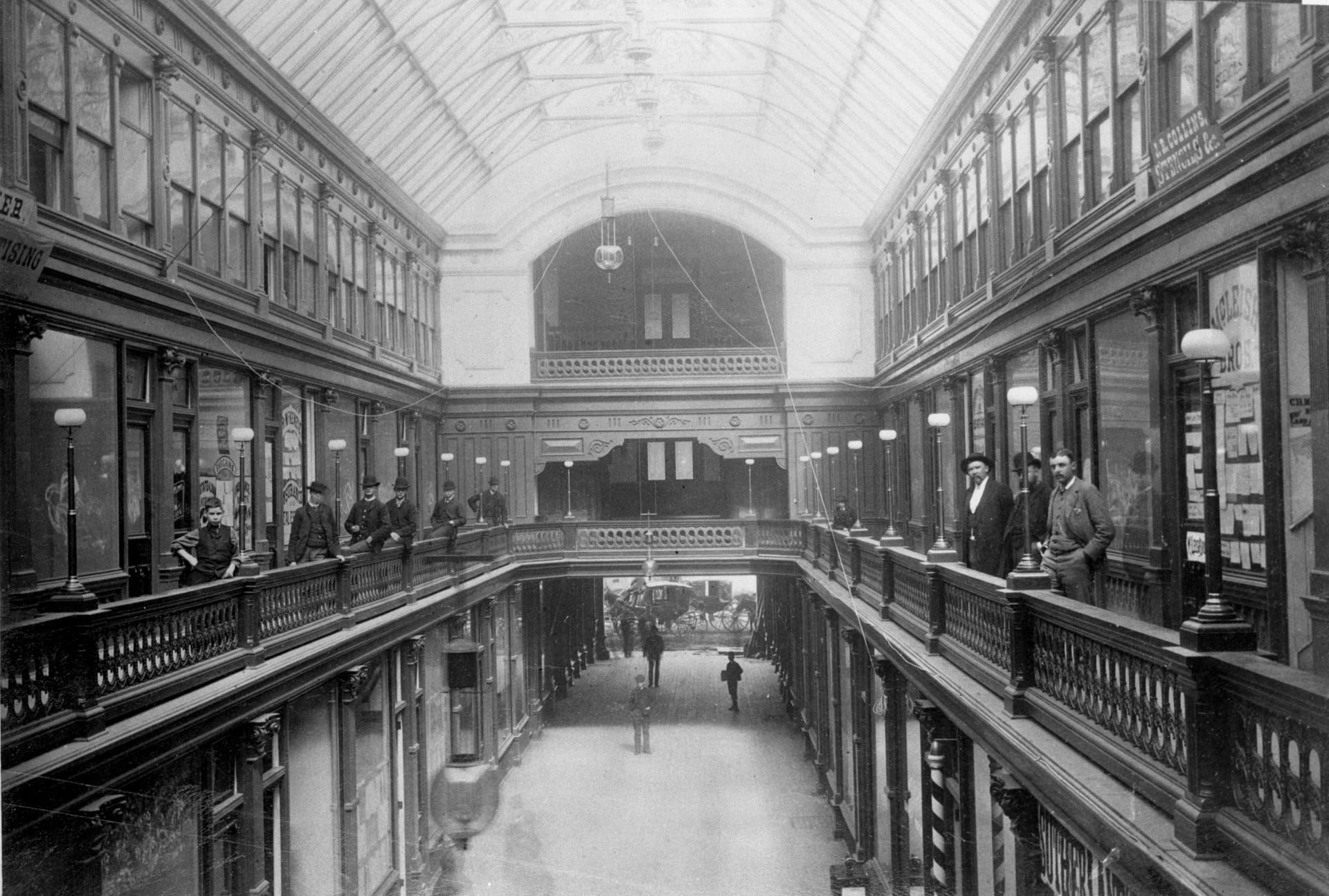
The original Yonge Street Arcade building, circa 1885. The shopping centre was opened in 1884 and operated until it was demolished in 1954 and replaced with the new Arcade Building.

- Don Mills Centre (1954–2006), Don Mills Road and Lawrence Avenue East, North York — former shopping mall with 98 stores. Originally a strip plaza, it was enclosed in 1978 and expanded from 400,000 to 462,000 square feet (37,000 to 43,000 m^{2}). Closed and demolished in 2006, it was replaced by Shops at Don Mills in 2009. Cadillac Fairview operated a shuttle bus service to Fairview Mall until it opened. Former Dominion (rebranded as Metro in 2008) and the Royal Bank Building are the only remaining buildings that were once part of the old mall.
- Galleria Shopping Centre at Dufferin Street and Dupont Street, Old Toronto; demolition began in January 2020 and is replaced with a condominium development with retail podium.
- Golden Mile Plaza (1954–1986) at Eglinton Avenue East and Victoria Park Avenue, demolished after the 1986 fire and later replaced with a power centre named Golden Mile Mall.
- Honeydale Mall (1973–2013): Located in Eatonville neighbourhood of Toronto; officially closed on 28 June 2013. Mall is in situ awaiting demolition.
- Morningside Mall (1979–2007) at Morningside Avenue and Kingston Road, Scarborough; the indoor mall was demolished to make way for an outdoor big box plaza called Morningside Crossing.
- Northtown Shopping Centre (1950s–2000s) – located at 5421 Yonge and built on part of Cummer Pioneer Cemetery (north Parr along Yonge) and demolished and replaced by condominium complex (Delmanor Northtown) with some retail space at ground level.
- Rexdale Plaza (1957–2004), Islington Avenue and Rexdale Boulevard, Etobicoke and enclosed in 1972. Most stores closed by 2003 and demolition of south end in 2004 with north end of mall retained (with an Asian supermarket and a few small stores). Since 2004, its south end was redeveloped as an outdoor mall with Wal-Mart Supercentre as a stand-alone big box store.
- Sunnybrook Plaza, Eglinton Avenue East and Bayview Avenue, East York, demolished and will be redeveloped as three-tower residential complex with ground level retail units with possible connection to Leaside station of the Toronto subway system's Line 5 Eglinton.
- Warden Woods Mall or Warden Power Centre (1981–2005) at Warden Avenue north of St. Clair Avenue East near Warden station of Line 2, Scarborough was a full mall with three anchor stores (The Bay, Simpson's and a Knob Hill Farms grocery store) and later as clearance centre. It has since been demolished and replaced with townhouses.
- Weston-Finch Mall (1960s–2006), Weston Road and Finch Avenue West, North York was a strip mall (with Zellers, Canadian Tire and McDonald's as tenants) and later as outlet facility; demolished 2006 and vacant lot partially redeveloped as Primo Towers rental apartments. North end still vacant.
- Westside Mall, Eglinton Avenue West west of Caledonia Road, York — replaced with a power centre of the same name during the early 2000s (with Canadian Tire, Rogers Wireless (originally Rogers Video then Rogers Plus), FreshCo (renamed from Price Chopper), Dollar Tree (formerly occupied by Shoppers Drug Mart) and CIBC as major tenants) and is connected to Caledonia station of both GO Transit's Barrie line and Line 5 Eglinton since Line 5's opening on 8 February 2026.
- The original Yonge Street Arcade (1884–1954) at 137 Yonge Street and consisting of 52 stores was considered Canada's first indoor mall. It was demolished in 1954 following two fires and was replaced in 1960 by the Arcade Building, which had a similar arcade-style concourse on its main floor until 2008 when the floor was redeveloped with the arcade being replaced with Goodlife Fitness health club and offices.

=== Former flea markets ===
- Flea market at the southwest corner of Midland Avenue and Sheppard Avenue East is closed since the early 2000s and the property was to be redeveloped concurrent with the Sheppard East LRT's construction; the construction of the LRT was cancelled and LRT has been replaced with a Line 4 extension to McCowan Road with an interchange with an extended Line 2 to Sheppard-McCowan station.
- Dufferin and Steeles Flea Market — replaced with the Home Depot.
- Toronto Weston Flea Market, Old Weston Road and St. Clair Avenue West, Old Toronto (later relocated to a much smaller site nearby on St. Clair Avenue West at Hounslow Heath Road between Old Weston Road and GO Transit's Barrie line)

== See also ==
- List of largest shopping centres in Canada
- List of shopping malls in Canada
