= Honeydale Mall =

Abandoned mall in Toronto, Ontario, Canada

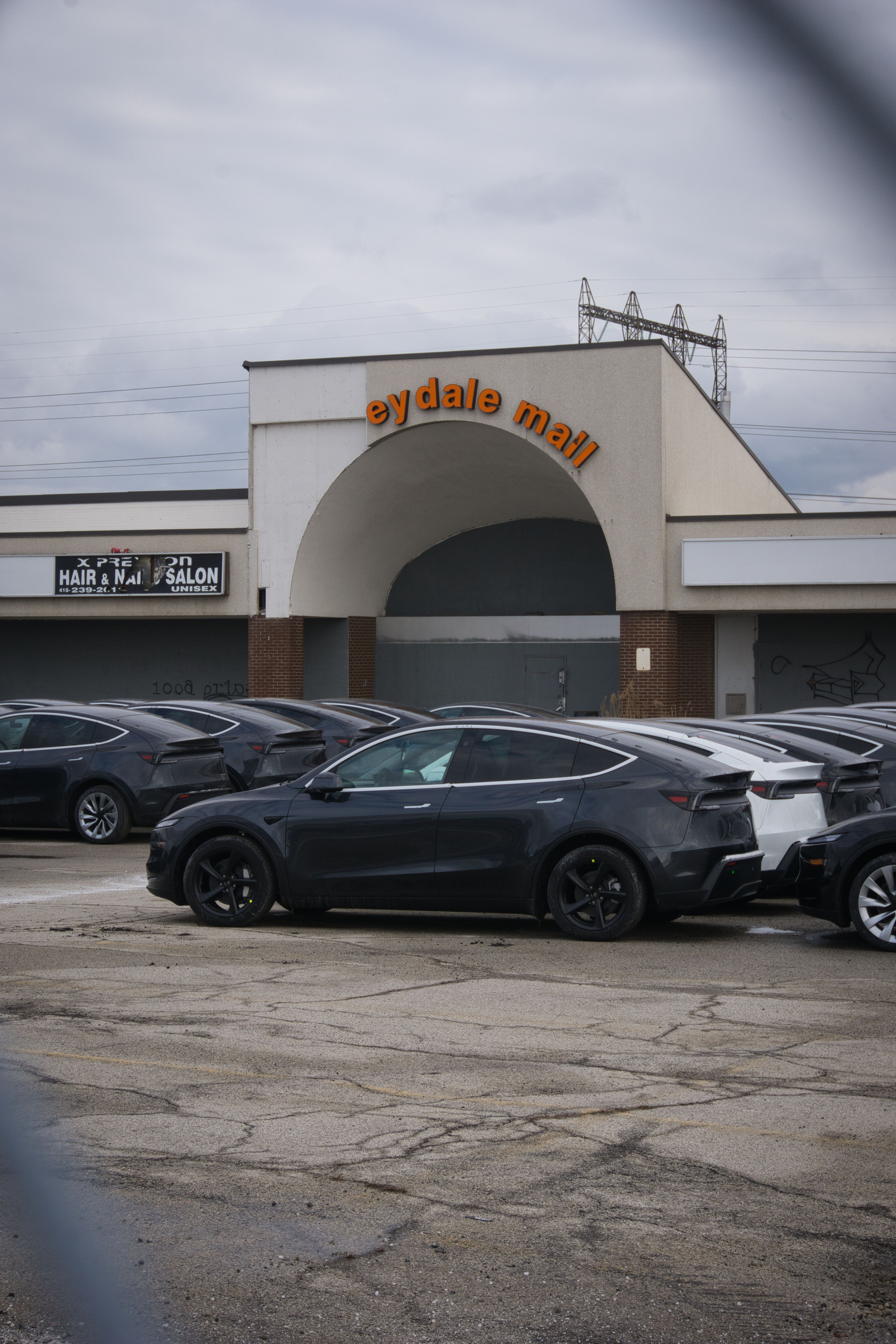
- Exterior of Honeydale Mall in 2025
- Location: Toronto, Ontario, Canada
- Coordinates: 43.62940°N 79.54679°W
- Address: 5555 Dundas Street West
- Opened: ~ November 1973
- Closed: June 28, 2013
- Owner: Azuria Group - former Gagnon Law Bozzo Urban Planners - current
- Num. of stores: 0 (originally 12)
- Num. of anchor tenants: 0 (originally 2)
- Floor area: 20,200 m^{2} (217,000 sq ft)
- Floors: 1

Honeydale Mall was a community shopping mall in Toronto, Ontario, Canada. It was located at the intersection of Dundas Street and The East Mall Crescent (the latter being a link connecting the grade-separated roads, The East Mall and Dundas Street). It served the Eatonville neighbourhood of Etobicoke district.

It opened in 1973 with a supermarket anchor, a Woolco department store, and a short enclosed mall. In 1994, Wal-Mart took over the Woolco location and remained in the mall until 2004.

The mall declined after Walmart's departure, and was described as being on "death row". In February 2006, The Bay Furniture Outlet opened inside the mall, and just after that, a flea market. But within the next 3-6 years, both stores were closed because of low traffic. After The Bay Furniture Outlet closed, a clearance warehouse would lease the vacant Wal-Mart space annually, but stopped after 2012.

In May 2009, it had two anchor stores (a No Frills supermarket and a flea market), a restaurant and dental office. The mall's No Frills supermarket closed in June 2013, and the entire mall was shuttered and locked up later that year, ending its 40 years of operation. A portion of the parking lot beyond Paulart Drive and next to the old Walmart site is being used to store empty trailer units.

Azuria Group, the owner of Honeydale, allowed the property to decline and it attempted to pursue high density residential redevelopment options which may include land for a new subway station. However, the application has stalled as the city of Toronto has required Azuria to do studies on the project.

== Decline ==
Honeydale Mall was one of the numerous post-World War II small neighbourhood community malls that were built in the inner suburbs of Toronto where residential neighbourhoods were growing. All of these community plazas were strip malls with one or two anchors, and most of these fared poorly by the 1990s as shopping trends changed to power centres anchored by big-box stores. The one exception to this was Bayview Village Shopping Centre, which was largely comparable to Honeydale until the 1990s. Unlike Honeydale, the owners of Bayview Village frequently overhauled the property to keep up with current trends, and found high-end independent boutiques not available in larger malls. Bayview Village is located in the affluent areas of Willowdale and Bayview Village where significant transit-oriented condominium development has enabled it to thrive despite being close to the larger Fairview Mall.

Near to where Dundas Street crosses The East Mall is Cloverdale Mall. Both Honeydale and Cloverdale are in the shadow of the considerably larger and affluent Sherway Gardens. Although Cloverdale is only a mid-size retail centre, it has nonetheless managed to thrive as it maintains four anchor stores and undertook a major renovation in 2003-04. By contrast, the owners of Honeydale were reluctant to spend money to keep the mall competitive since the departure of Wal-Mart, instead attempting to rezone the land for sale or a condo development.

An application has been sent to the city by Azuria Group to request the site and the A&P site to the west be re-zoned from industrial class to residential, thus allowing to build homes and condominiums on the site. The proposed residential development is being built by Gagnon Law Bozzo Urban Planners.

== Redevelopment ==
There is a planned redevelopment of the property, however it is unclear if or when the property will be demolished.

== Gallery ==
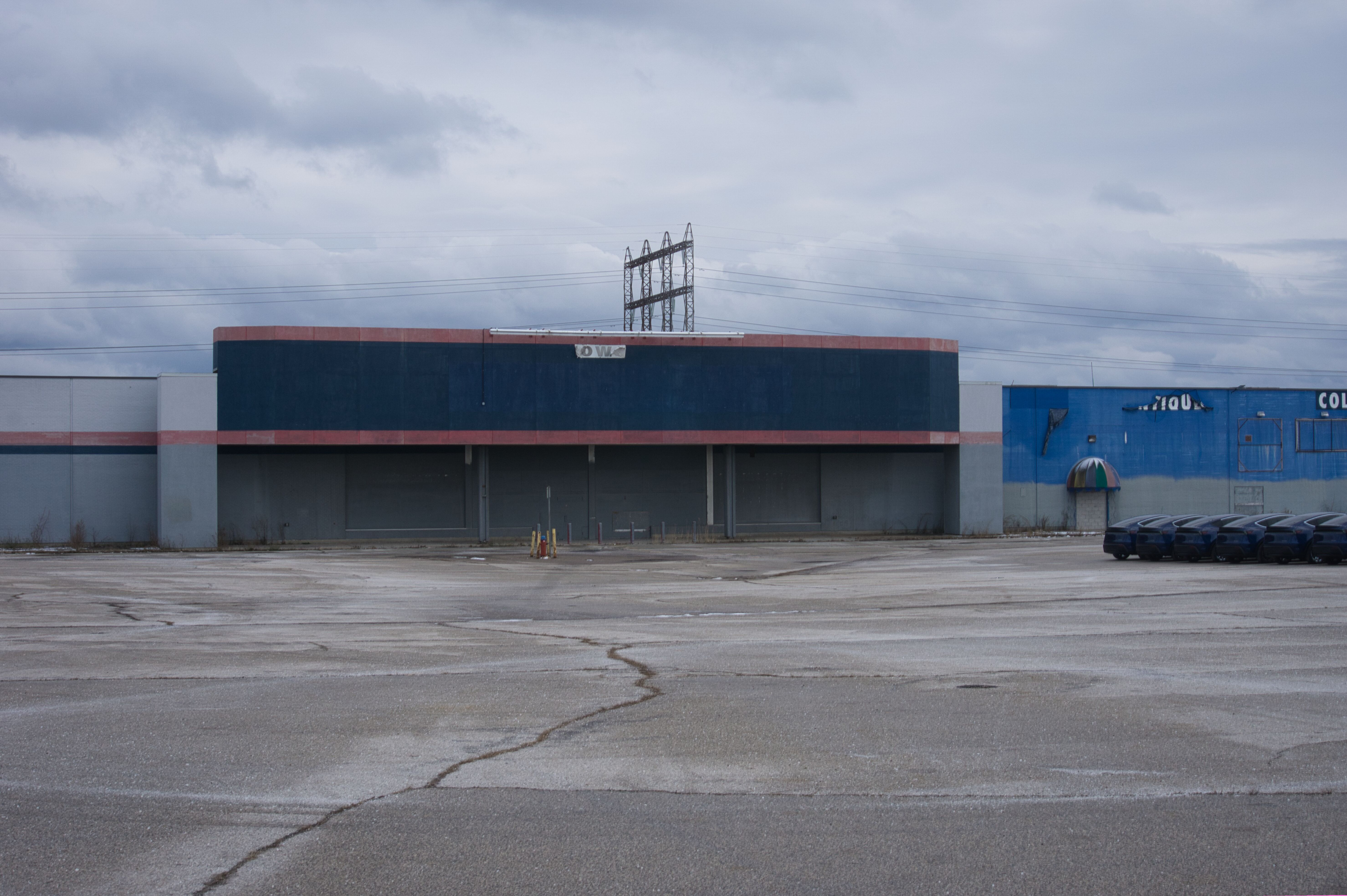
The former Wal-Mart location

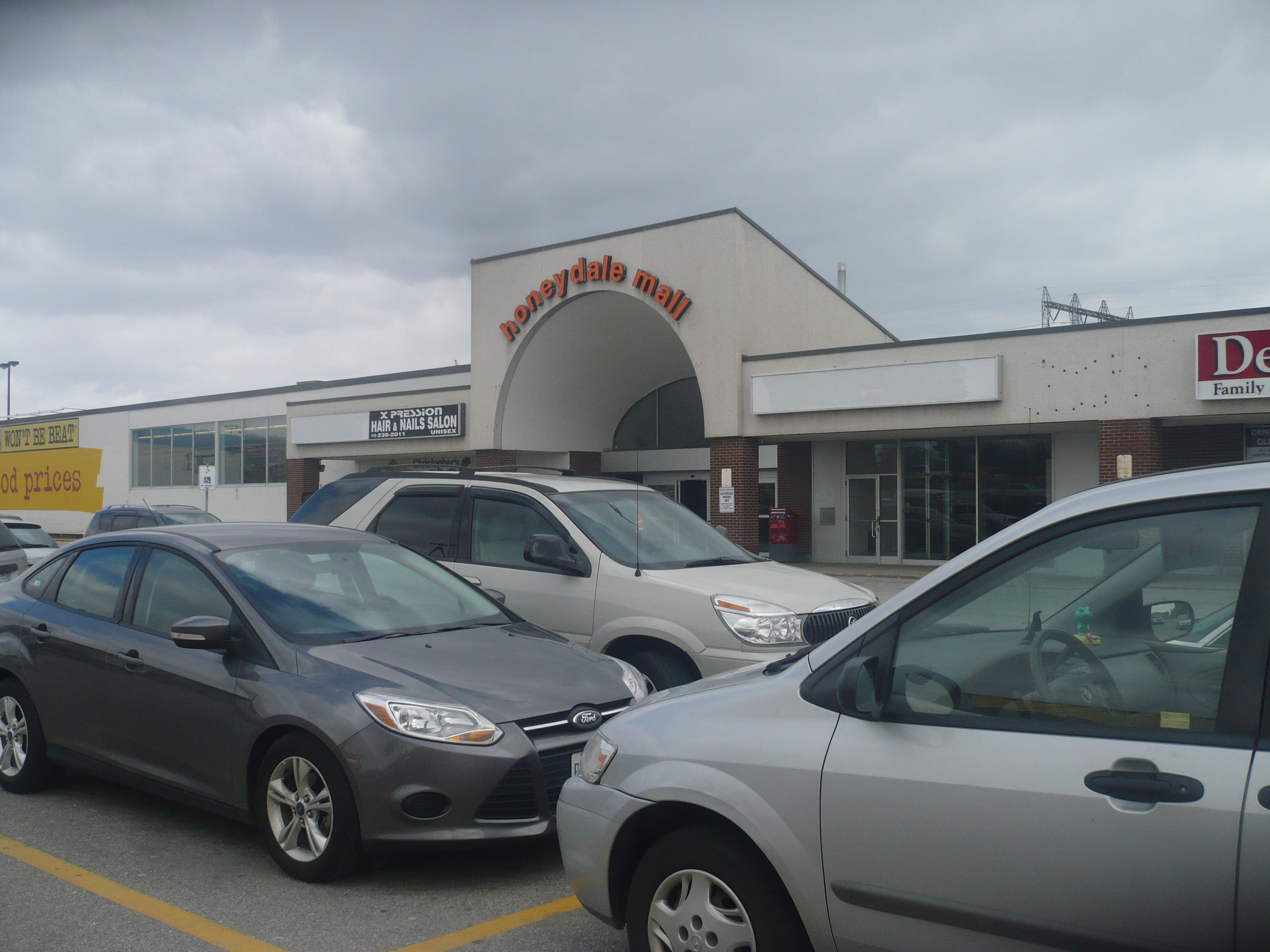
The exterior of Honeydale Mall in 2013

== See also ==
- Dead mall
- Eau Claire Market
- Heritage Mall (Edmonton)
- Galleria Shopping Centre
