= Woodside Square =

Shopping mall in Toronto, Canada

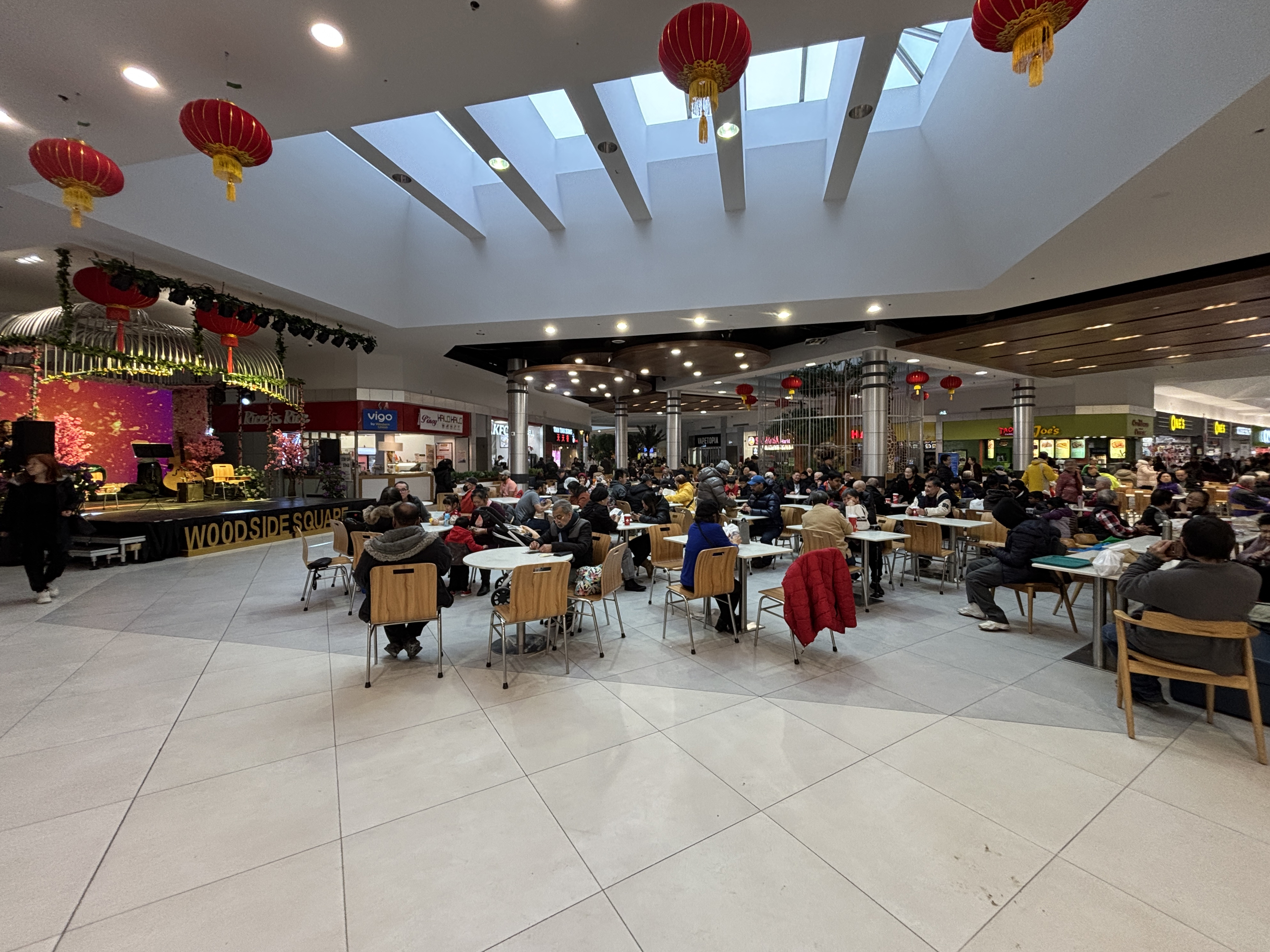
- Location: Toronto, Ontario
- Coordinates: 43°48′32″N 79°16′12″W
- Address: 1571 Sandhurst Circle
- Opened: 1977
- Manager: Triovest Reality Advisors Inc.
- Num. of stores: 90+
- Num. of anchor tenants: 6
- Floor area: 273,452 sq ft (25,405 m^{2})
- Floors: 2
- Parking: 1500 spaces
- Public transit: 129; 39; 939
- Website: woodsidesquare.com/home

Woodside Square is a shopping mall in Toronto, Ontario, Canada. It is located at the northwest corner of Finch Avenue East and McCowan Road at Sandhurst Circle. The mall is located in the heart of Agincourt in the Scarborough district.

== History ==
The mall opened in 1977. Notable anchors at one time included Dominion, J. Pascal's Hardware and Furniture (later as Zellers), and a Chinese cuisine named "Ruby Chinese Restaurant." The Scarborough Public Library Board also opened the Woodside Square branch in the mall during the mall's early years of operation.

The Zellers was closed down and the space divided into multiple retailers and includes a Food Basics.

Near the mid-2000s, the McDonald's which had been located inside the mall was rebuilt as a freestanding tenant outside the mall to accommodate with the number of customers.

In 2007, the library began to run out of room for its collection, while coincidentally, the Dominion supermarket was closing down at the mall, as it was being acquired by Metro Inc. This supermarket location ended up not being converted into a Metro, and was renovated to include more retail space. The library was moved here, and a Shopper's Drug Mart was opened in the remaining space.

On 7 October 2009, Toronto Public Health closed the Ruby Chinese Cuisine after a man supposedly died after eating food from the cuisine. After investigations, an outbreak of salmonella was found in the restaurant.

During 2012–2013, the mall redeveloped over 45,000 sq ft (4,181 m^{2}) of land to add more stores and restaurants. They include many fast food restaurants, a Le Château Outlet, and another Chinese restaurant, named Congee Town.

In 2019, the mall underwent interior renovations to modernize the mall. New ceramic flooring, smooth ceiling, LED lighting, restaurants, and an upgraded food court and washroom were part of the renovations.

In the Fall of 2019, the Woodside Square Planning Review was initiated to explore additional development opportunities for Woodside Square, including new housing and parkland. The mall will be maintained and developments will be built around it. The planning review will evaluate the appropriateness of permitting additional land uses on the site. The planning review will also establish the policy framework to guide any future redevelopment on the site.

Dubbed as "Woodside Centre" which should not be confused with the sprawling commercial plaza located at Woodbine Avenue and Highway 7, this mixed-use development will feature multiple condo towers, additional shops, parking, and parklands.

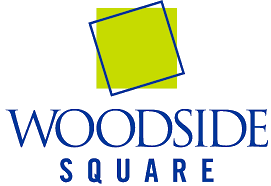
Woodside Square's logo

== See also ==
- List of shopping malls in Toronto
