= Arcade Building (Toronto) =

Coordinates: 43.651211°N 79.378042°W

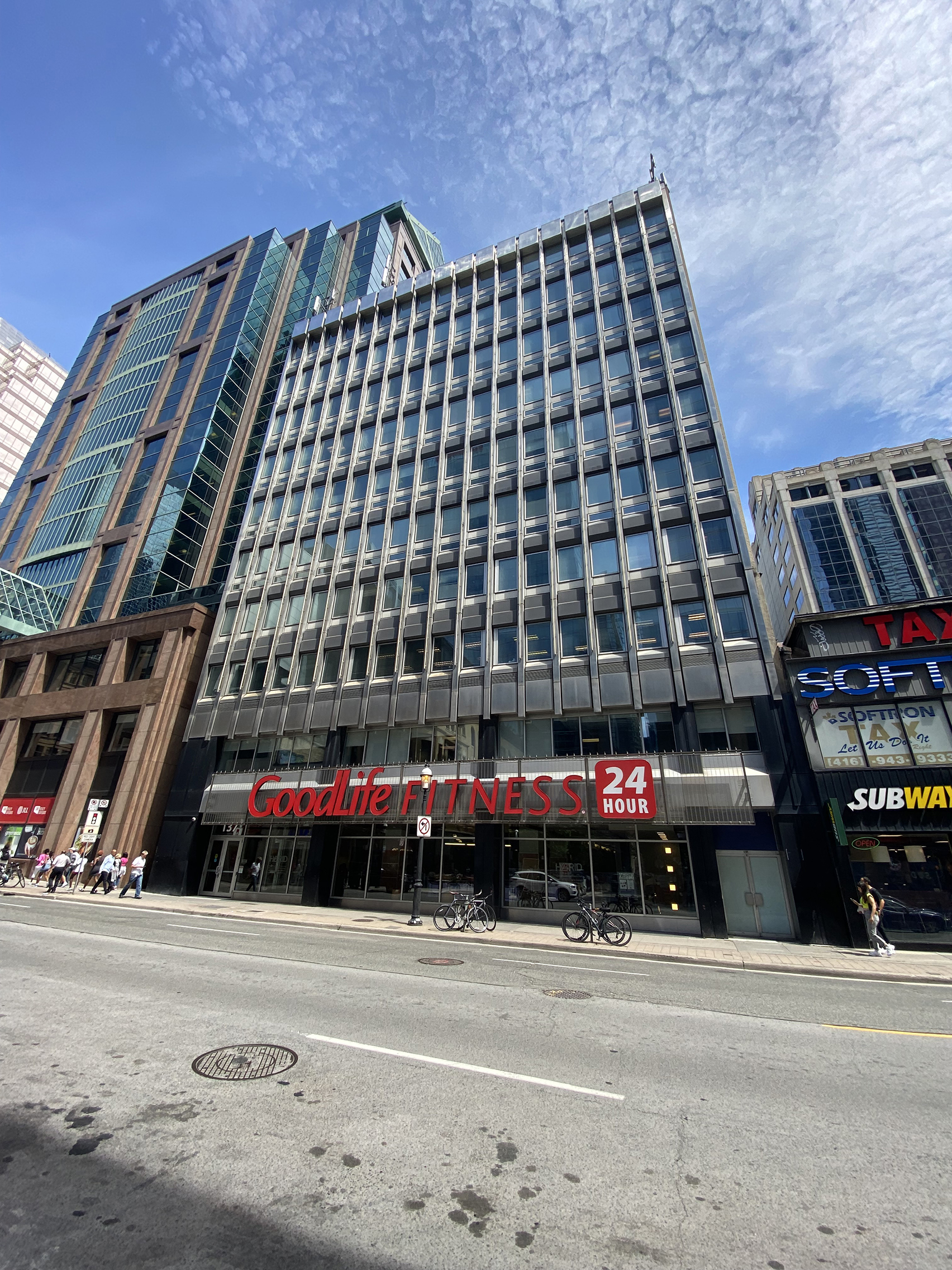
- Arcade Building in 2023
- Interactive map of the Arcade Building area

General information
- Location: 137 Yonge Street/74 Victoria Street, Toronto, Ontario, Canada
- Opened: 1960

Technical details
- Floor count: 10

The Arcade Building is a ten-storey office building with ground-floor retail in downtown Toronto, Ontario, Canada. It is known for the colourful LED lighting that has adorned its facade since 2008. The site was previously an indoor shopping arcade.

Opened in 1960, the building is located at 137 Yonge Street at Temperance Street and extends eastward to 74 Victoria Street at Lombard Street. The upper floors are commercial office space. The first floor originally had an arcade-style retail concourse but this was closed in 2008 and the main floor was redeveloped as a GoodLife Fitness centre and office space.

The outer facade is steel and glass in the internationalist style.

== Original Arcade building ==
The 1960 building replaced the 1884 Yonge Street Arcade, an indoor shopping mall and commercial building that was demolished in 1954. The original 1884 building, designed by architect Charles A. Walton, is considered to be Canada's first indoor shopping mall, or arcade. The four-storey indoor mall linked Yonge Street and Temperance Streets to Victoria and Lombard Streets one block east. The arcade consisted of 52 retail stores and was intended to compete with the large nearby department stores. Businesses located at the arcade included the British American Business College on the top two floors, a dentist and a cattle dealer. The facility had two hydraulic elevators at either end of the arcade. The exterior was Ohio cut stone.

The arcade was a popular shopping destination for several decades. For a long time prominent signs proclaimed "Nothing over $18", and later, "Nothing over $25". By the 1950s, the building showed its age and the small shops and offices were considered outdated. Two fires damaged the structure in 1953. In January 1954, businesses were given one-month notices to vacate and the building was demolished later that year. The location was previously the site of the Bay Horse Hotel.

== Gallery ==
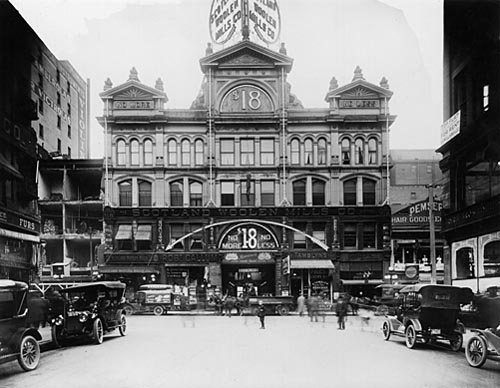
The original Arcade Building

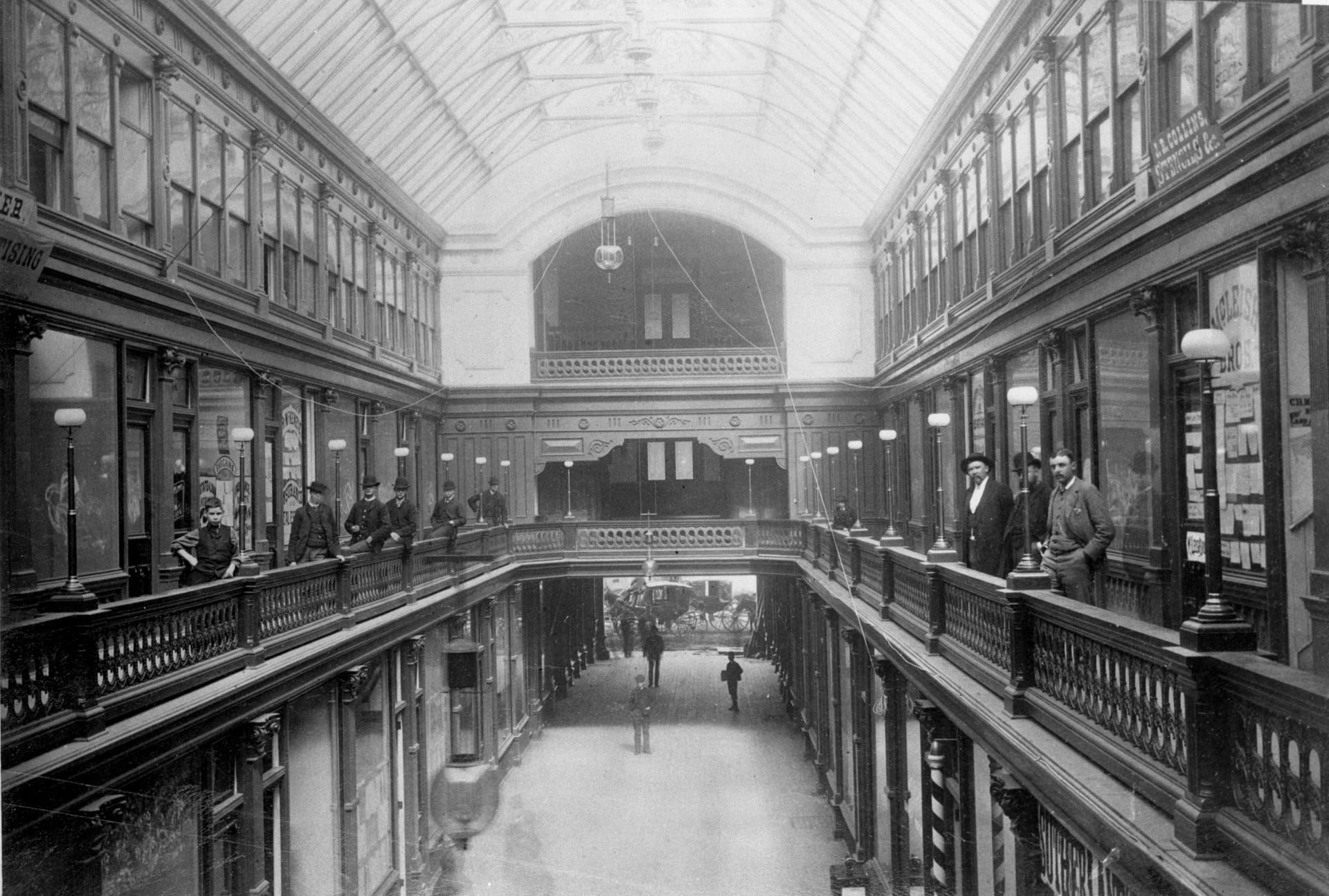
1885 view of interior of Yonge St Arcade

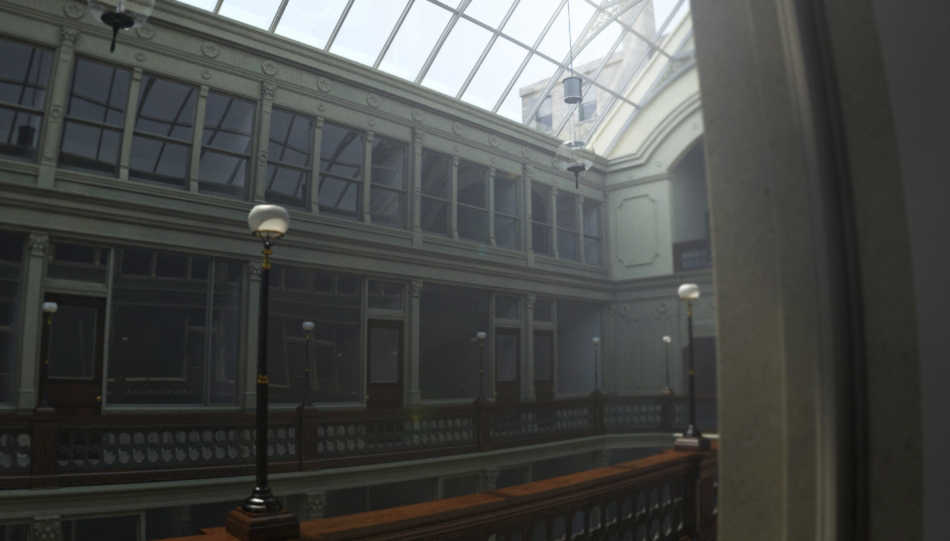
Rendered image of interior of old Arcade
