= Bayview Village Shopping Centre =

Shopping mall in Toronto, Canada

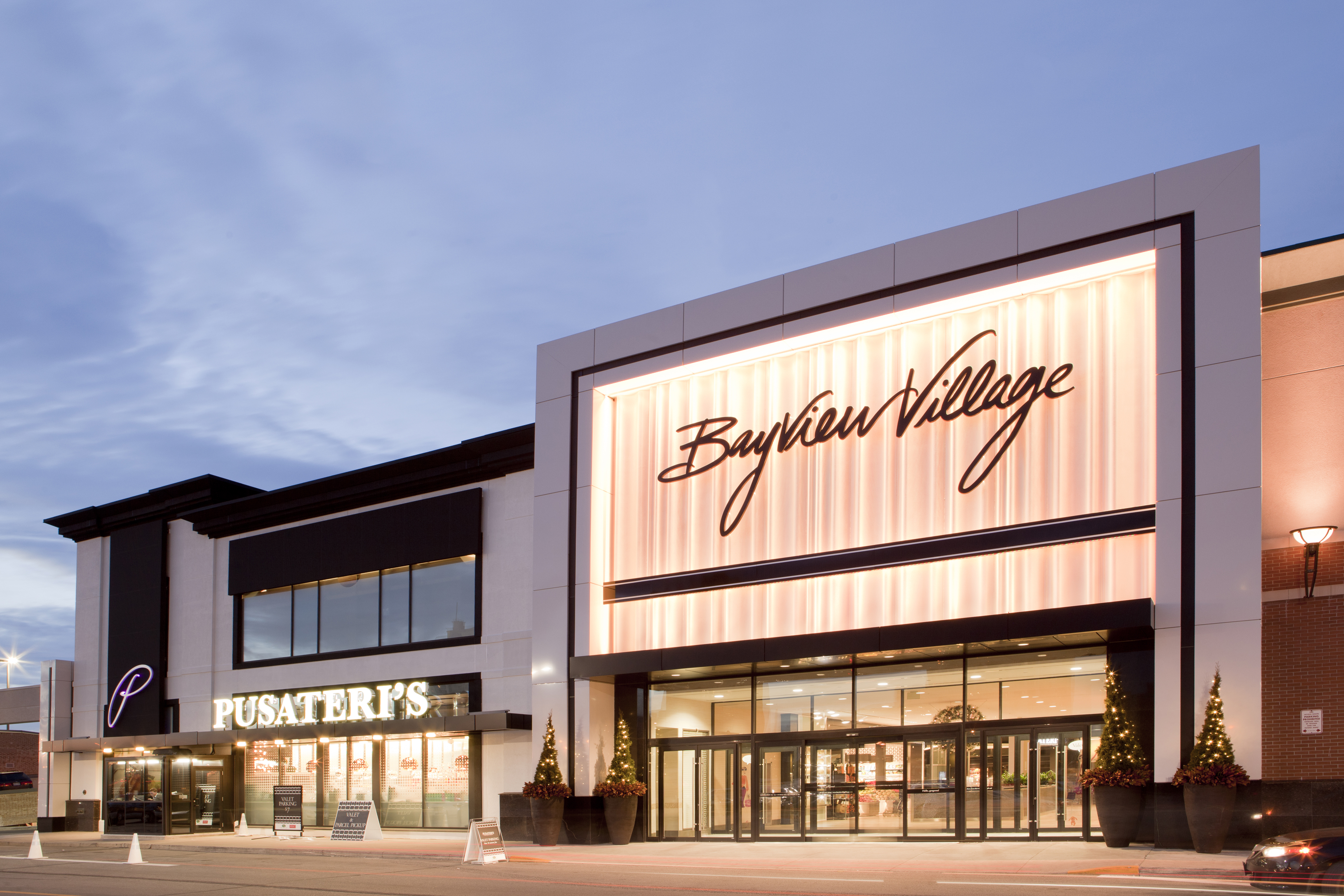
- Bayview Village Shopping Centre
- Coordinates: 43.768661°N 79.385812°W
- Address: 2901 Bayview Avenue; Toronto, Ontario; M2K 1E6
- Opened: 1963; 63 years ago
- Developer: Orlando Corporation
- Owner: QuadReal (BCIMC)
- Num. of stores: 110
- Num. of anchor tenants: 2 – Loblaws, Shoppers Drug Mart
- Floor area: 444,000 square feet (41,200 m^{2})
- Floors: 1
- Website: www.bayviewvillageshops.com

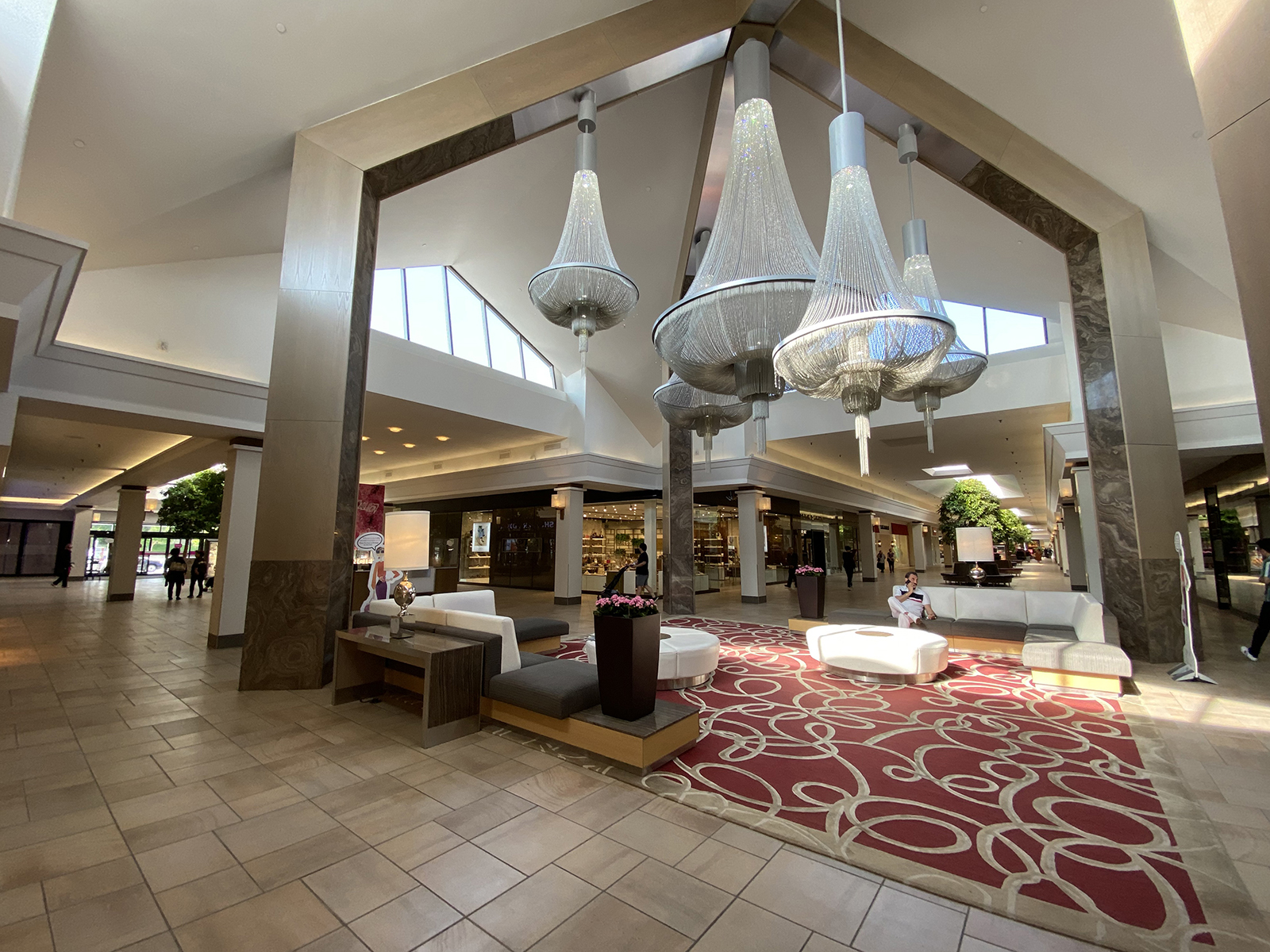
Mall Interior

Southwest entrance near Loblaws under a previous design

Bayview Village Shopping Centre is a shopping mall in Toronto, Ontario, Canada. The 440,000-square-foot (41,000 m^{2}) shopping mall is located at the northeast corner of Bayview Avenue and Sheppard Avenue in the former city of North York. It has a total of 110 stores, the anchor stores being Loblaws, Shoppers Drug Mart and LCBO.

== History ==
Bayview Village was built in the 1960s as an open-air mall. It was one of the numerous post-World War II small neighbourhood community malls that were built in the inner suburbs of Toronto where residential neighbourhoods were growing. All of these community plazas were strip malls with one or two anchors.

By the 1990s, shopping trends changed to power centres anchored by big-box stores, and many of these community malls, such as Honeydale Mall in the Etobicoke area of Toronto, declined during this time. However, Bayview Village Mall stayed competitive as its owners frequently overhauled the property to keep up with current trends. To distinguish itself from larger shopping centres, the owners of Bayview Village gentrified and sought out high-end independent boutiques not available in larger malls. Bayview Village Mall was the host of the first GAP store in Canada.

Bayview Village Mall is located in the affluent neighbourhood of Bayview Village where significant transit-oriented condominium development has enabled it to thrive despite being close to the larger Fairview Mall. Since its redevelopment in 1998, the tenants of the mall have become more exclusive and aimed at the more affluent shoppers from the nearby areas of Bayview Village, Willowdale, York Mills, the Bridle Path, and Lawrence Park. It contains the "only North American outpost" of a number of high-end fashion designers, as well as outlets for luxury American designers such as Brooks Brothers and a branch of the expensive Toronto grocery store Pusateri's. The target customer for the Bayview Village Shopping Centre is female, over 30 years old, with an annual household income of over CA$100,000.

In 2013, the mall was conditionally sold for CA$500 million to the British Columbia Investment Management Corporation, a provincial pension plan manager. This was the biggest single property sale of 2013.

Long time anchor store Kmart closed in 1998. The store was demolished and the location redeveloped to house a Chapters and a large LCBO store as well as additional mall space. In 2018, Chapters closed its doors and left the space vacant afterwards. As a result of changes proposed by the owner to develop the site, the LCBO store moved into the former Chapters location in 2019.

== Site development ==
In August 2017, the owners proposed a major development of the site to add three residential towers on retail podiums as well as some additional low rise townhouse development and additional retail shops. The towers will be located on the existing surface parking area and additional underground parking is planned. The proposal has been revised following community input to include more parkland. It is currently being considered by the city planning department.
