= Bayview Village =

Coordinates: 43.777°N 79.379°W

- Neighbourhood
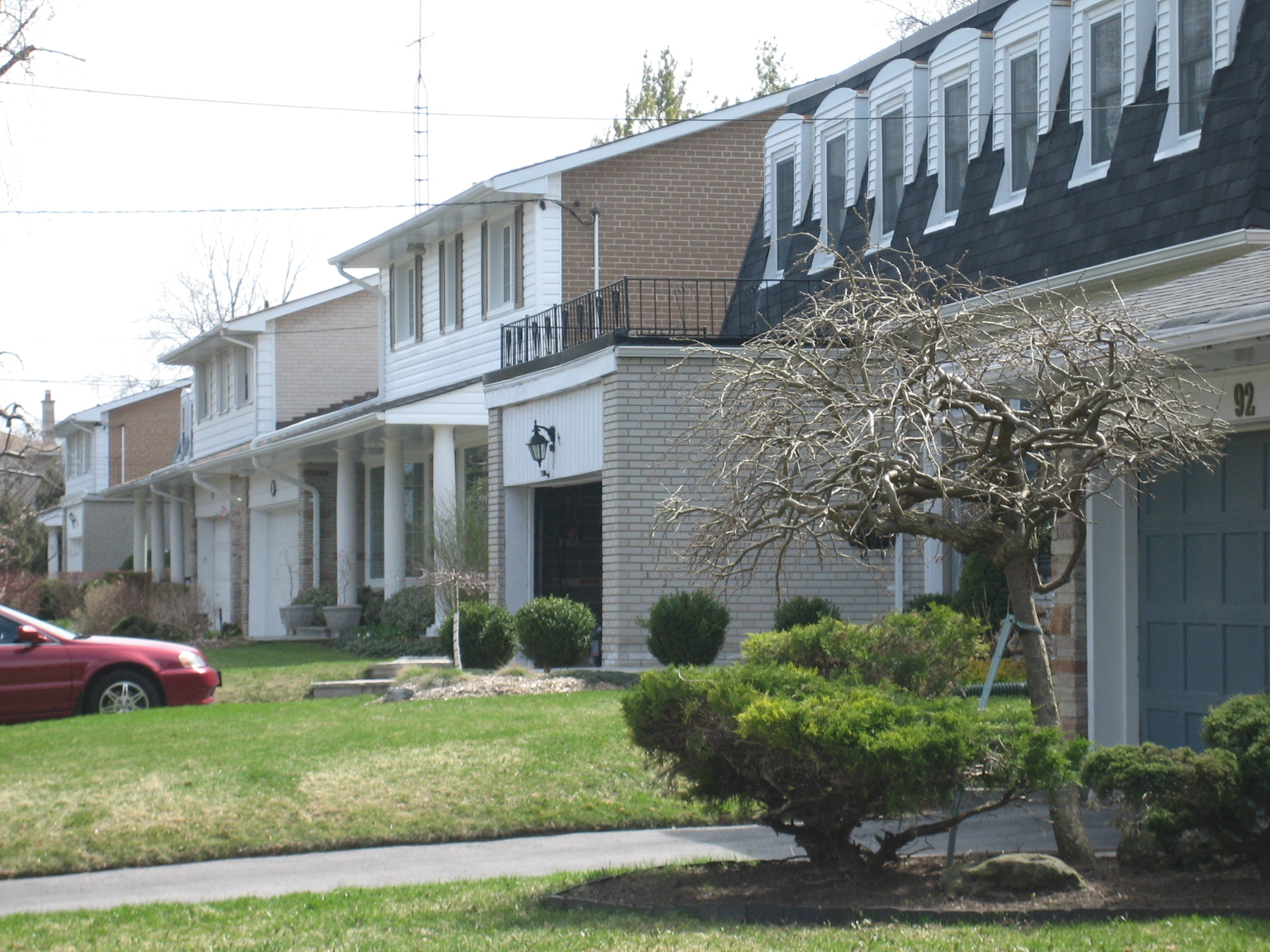

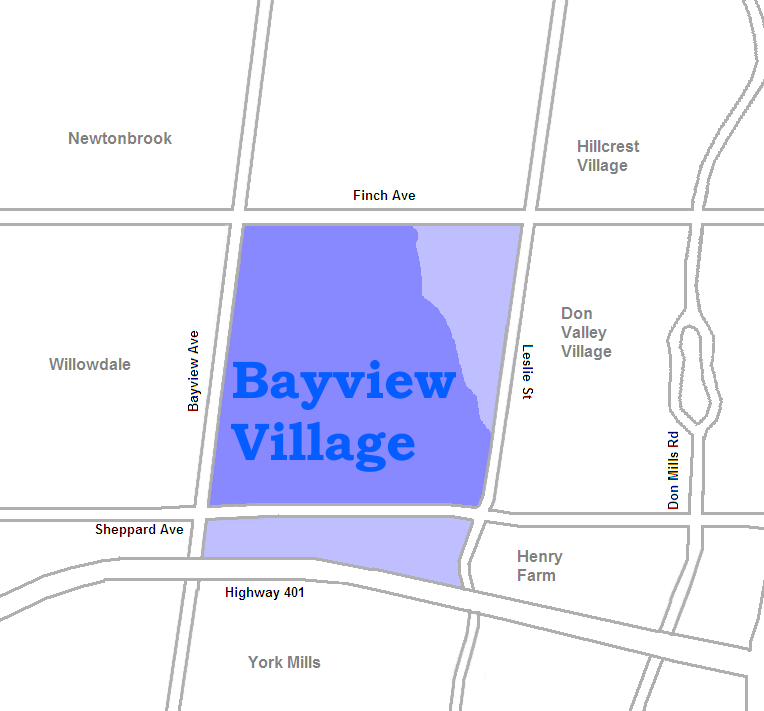
- Country: Canada
- Province: Ontario
- City: Toronto
- Municipality established: 1850 York Township
- Changed municipality: 1922 North York from York Township
- Changed municipality: 1998 Toronto from North York

Government
  - Councillor: Shelley Carroll
  - MP: Maggie Chi (Liberal)
  - MPP: Jonathan Tsao (Ontario Liberal)

Bayview Village is a neighbourhood in Toronto, Ontario, Canada. It is part of the federal Don Valley North riding and the provincial Don Valley North electoral district, and Toronto electoral Ward 17: Don Valley North. In 2006, it had a population of 15,370.

The area is bordered on the north by Finch Avenue East, on the west by Bayview Avenue, on the east by Leslie Street, and on the south by Highway 401, and also including the grounds of North York General Hospital, east of Leslie in the neighbourhood's southeast corner, according to the City of Toronto's definition. The Bayview Village Association regards the east boundary as the Don River (east branch) and the south boundary as Sheppard Avenue East, thereby excluding land between the Don River and Leslie, Sheppard and Highway 401.

== History ==
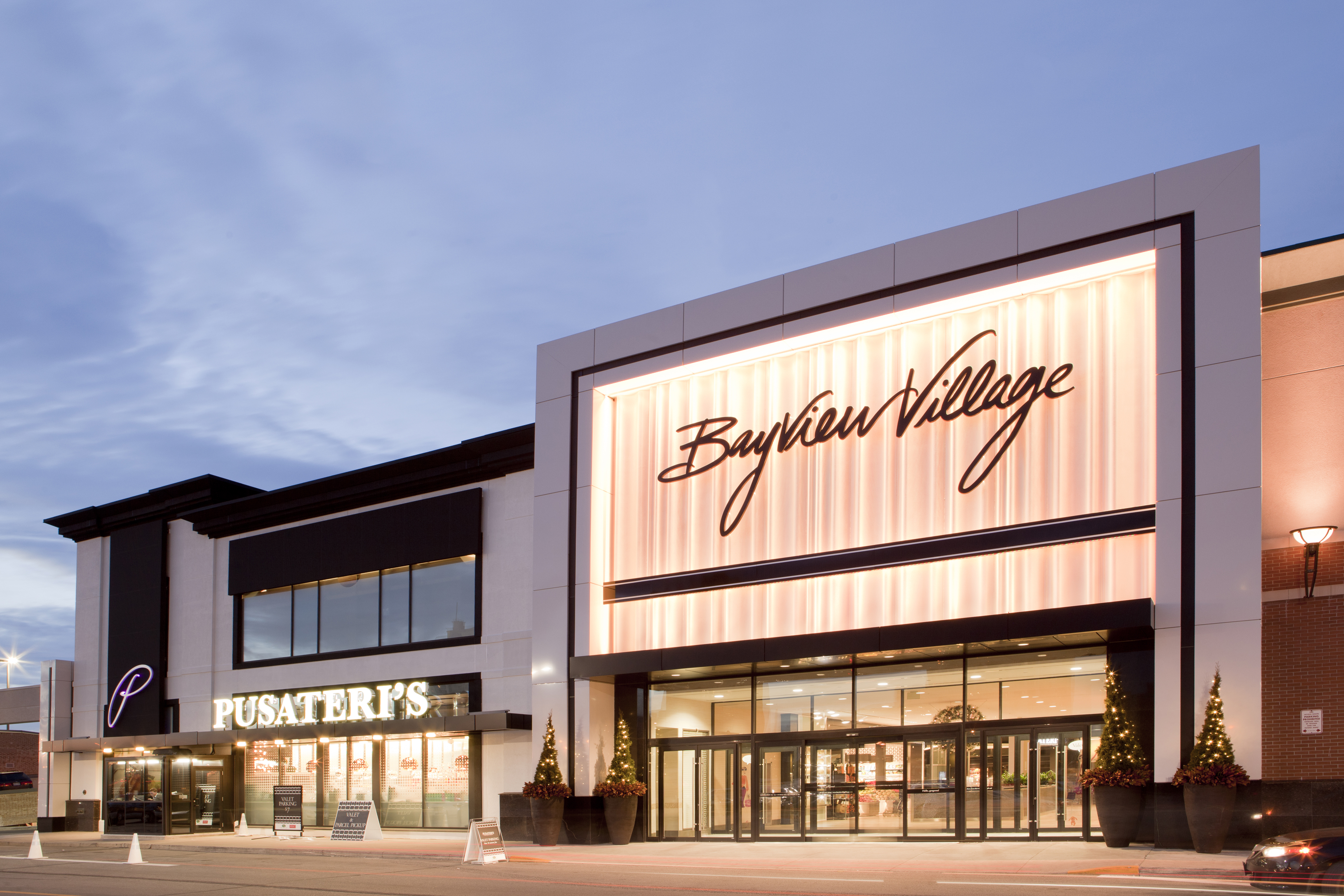
Bayview Village Shopping Centre was opened in the neighbourhood in 1963.

The Bayview Village neighbourhood was planned in 1954 by a group of developers led by Farlinger Development Ltd. Bayview Village was hailed as "contemporary living in the countryside, at the doorstep of the urban concentration of Metropolitan Toronto." The design and layout of Bayview Village is very much influenced by the East Don Valley Parklands. Eugenio G. Faludi, the town planner who designed Bayview Village, recognized the importance of the East Don Valley Parklands when he said: "We will fit the community into the landscape and not the landscape into the community." Faludi's trademark curvilinear street pattern follows the natural contours of the land. Nearly a quarter of the space in Bayview Village is green. Bayview Village's winding streets and culs-de-sac are planted with mature birch, cedar, willow, spruce, pine and maple trees. Some of the Bayview Village houses are situated on ravine lots that feature views of the East Don River Valley Parklands. Several of the street names in Bayview Village, such as Citation Drive, Palomino Cres., Ravenscroft Circle recall that the area was a racehorse training stable and grounds before being developed. In the Bayview Village area, there are United, Greek Orthodox, Catholic, and Anglican churches, the latter is located just outside the area's southwest boundary.

The Bayview Village Association was established in 1956. It is a volunteer group of residents who work to monitor city and provincial initiatives on a wide range of topics including traffic, local development, parks, and safety. In addition, they produce a regular newsletter distributed to all homes covering a wide range of topical issues. The Bayview Village Association also hosts a number of events throughout the year including clean-up days, all-candidates meetings, community fairs, speakers series, annual perennial swaps, etc. Over 50% of Bayview Village residents are members of the Association.

The Bayview Village Shopping Centre opened in 1963. It is located at the northeast corner of Sheppard Avenue and Bayview Avenue.

== Architecture ==
Most Bayview Village homes were built between 1954 and 1964. The mix of housing here includes raised and executive ranch style bungalows, split-level houses, and Georgian Revival-style homes. Most of the houses are original. Many homes have undergone renovation and landscaping to fit the park-like neighbourhood. There has been increasing infill housing (newly built houses replacing the older ones) within the Bayview Village area.

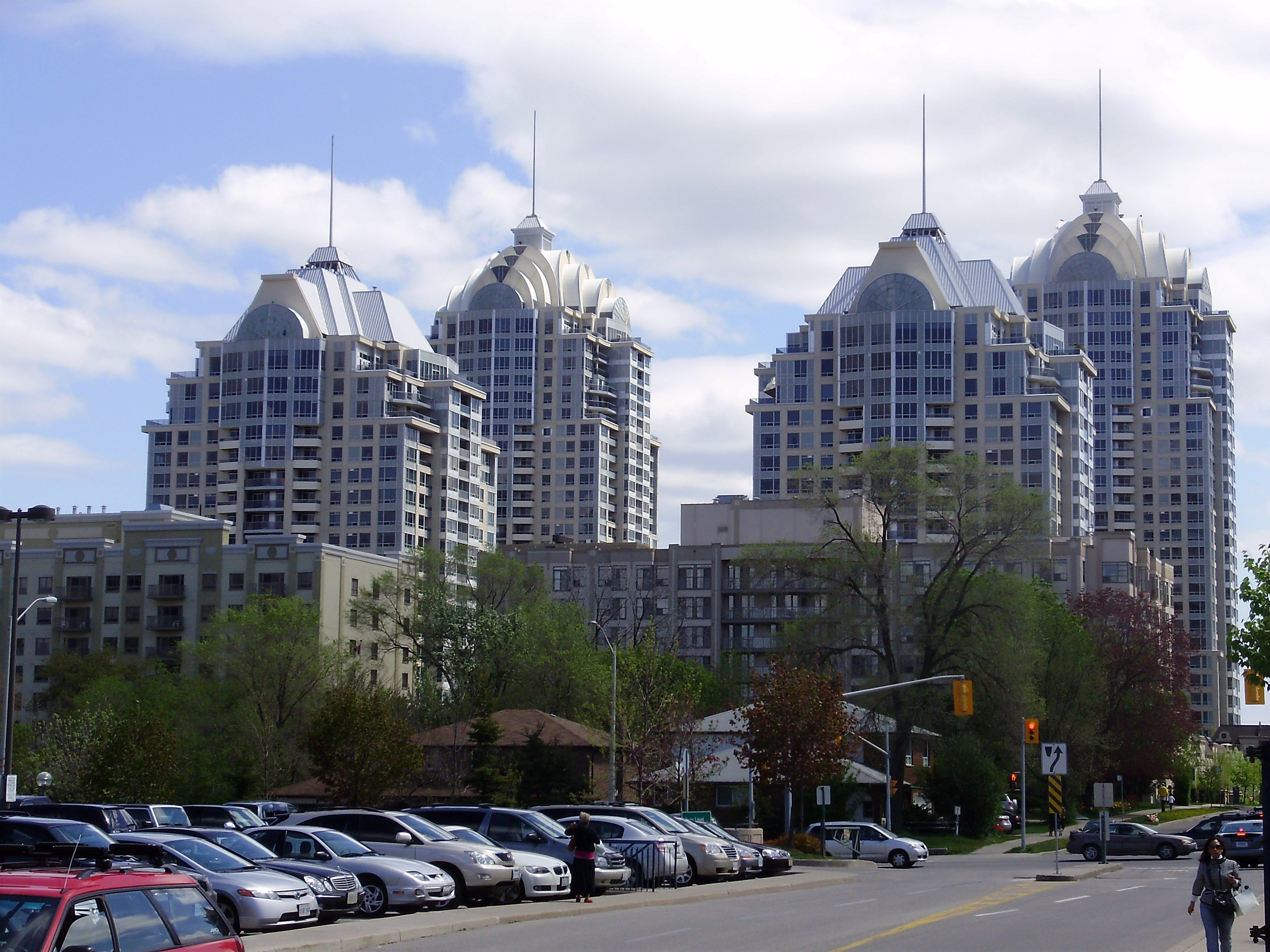
High-rise developments were developed along Sheppard Avenue.

There also continues to be high rise condominium development along Sheppard Avenue and in the land south of Sheppard Avenue and north of Highway 401. This development is of a completely different nature to the single-family suburban low-rise architecture found in the northern area.

== Education ==
One public school board operate schools in Bayview Village, the secular English first language Toronto District School Board (TDSB).

TDSB operate public elementary schools in the neighbourhood. The TDSB operates two institutions that provide primary education, Bayview Middle School, and Elkhorn Public School.

No school board operates a secondary school in the neighbourhood, with CSV, and TDSB secondary school students residing in Bayview Village attending institutions in adjacent neighbourhoods. The public separate school board, Toronto Catholic District School Board (TCDSB), and its French first language counterpart, Conseil scolaire catholique MonAvenir (CSCM) also offer schooling to applicable residents of Bayview Village. However, they do not operate a school in the neighbourhood. CSCM and TCDSB students attend schools situated in other neighbourhoods in Toronto.

== Recreation ==
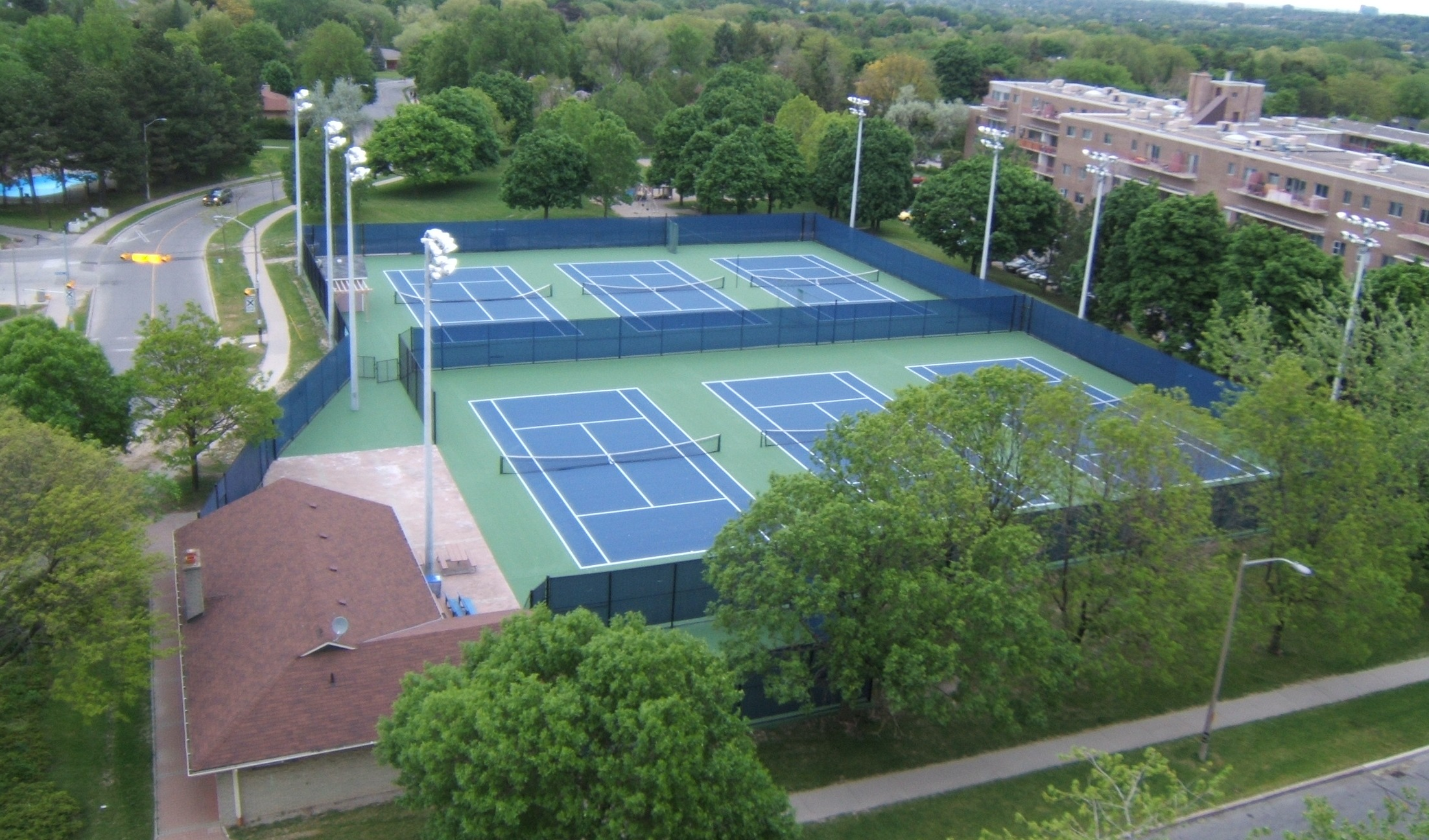
The neighbourhood is home to the Bayview Village Tennis Club.

The Bayview Village Tennis Club, home of "tennis ace" Daniel Nestor is a community tennis club serving Bayview Village since 1975. It was an initiative of the Bayview Village Association. The courts at Bayview Village Tennis Club were completely rebuilt at the end of the 2008 tennis season. Today, Bayview Village Tennis Club continues to be looked upon as the premier tennis club of North York. There are also free public tennis courts in Bayview Village Park.

The North York YMCA, located at the southeast corner of Bayview Avenue and Sheppard Avenue, is the largest recreational facility serving this neighbourhood. Some of the programs being offered at this YMCA include play-gym and swim lessons for preschoolers, gymnastics, karate, swimming and basketball programs for children, and aerobics, yoga and aquafit for adults. Facilities at this centre include a gymnasium, a dance studio, a conditioning room, a main swimming pool with lanes and a training swimming pool.

=== Parks ===
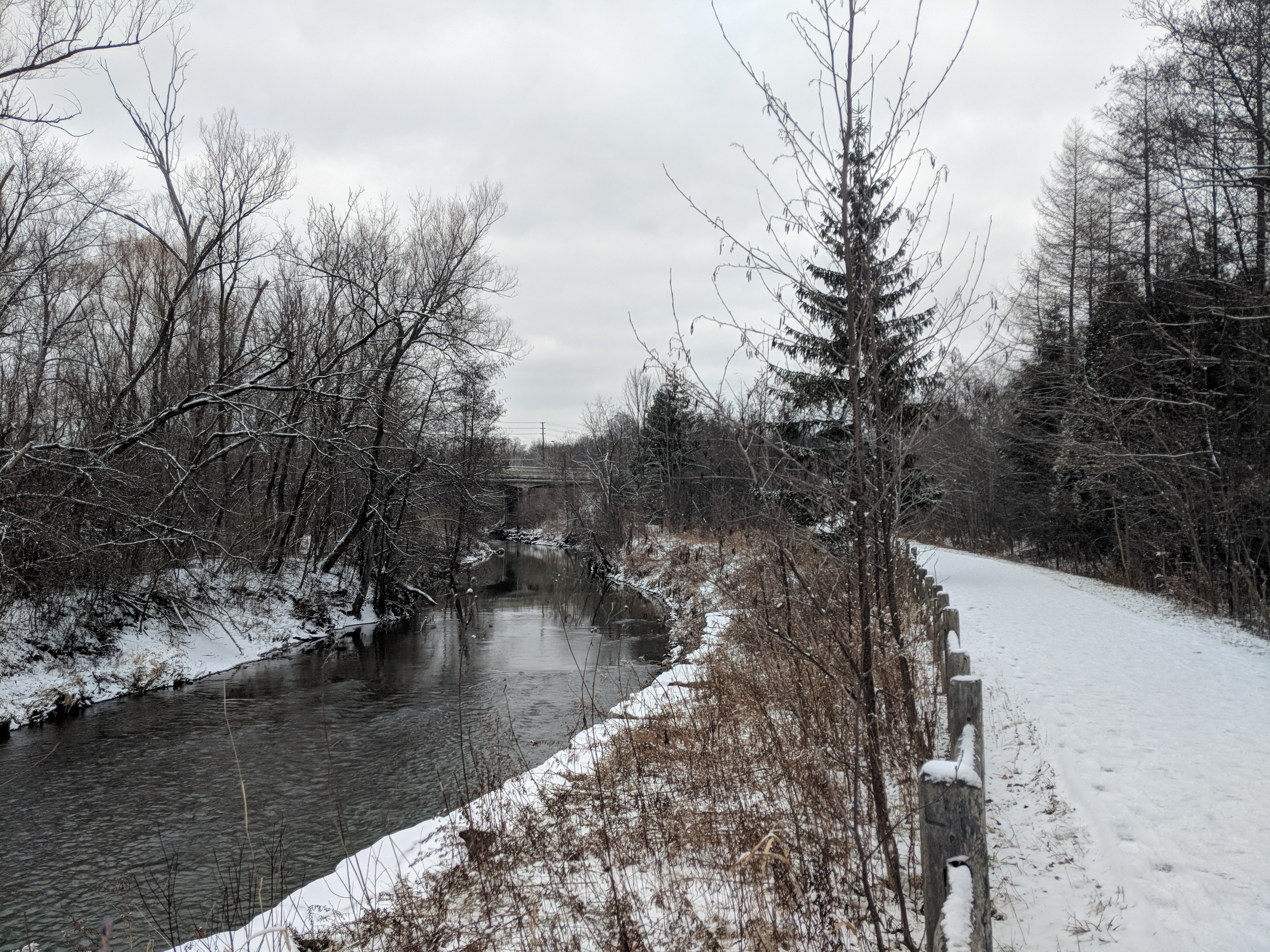
The East Don Parkland Trail south of Finch Avenue.

The western edge of the East Don Parklands winds its way through the centre of Bayview Village and is a vast and expansive green haven with various trails, walkways and bicycle paths. The park's naturalization and preservation programs have made the space a habitat for wildlife and a number of rare plant species. The East Don Parklands is situated around the East Don River Valley, which forms a part of the larger Toronto ravine system.

There are many smaller parks and parkettes in Bayview Village including Alamosa Park, and Leslie Park. Blue Ridge Park, Clarinda Park and Bayview Village Park are child-focused, with baseball diamonds, splash pads and playgrounds. Municipal parks in Bayview Village are maintained by the Toronto Parks, Forestry and Recreation Division.

== Transportation ==
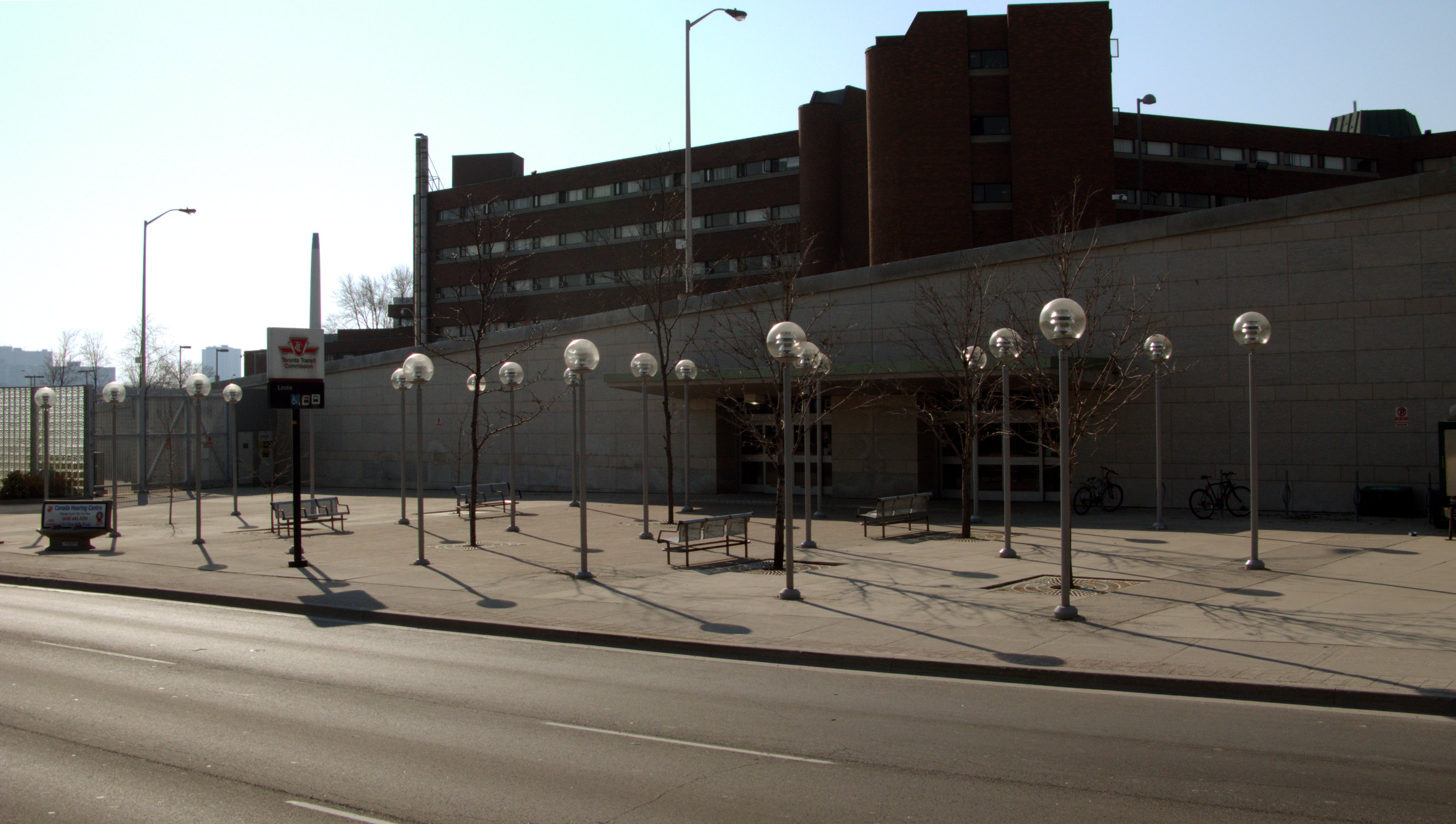
Entrance to Leslie station, a station for the Toronto subway.

Several major roadways serve as the boundary of the neighbourhood, with Bayview Avenue to the west, Finch Avenue to the north, Leslie Street to the east, and Highway 401 to the south. Highway 401 is a major east-west controlled access highway. Other major east-west roadways in the neighbourhood include Sheppard Avenue.

Public transportation in Bayview Village is provided by the Toronto Transit Commission (TTC), which operates several bus routes, as well as Line 4 Sheppard of the Toronto subway. The subway may be accessed at three stations on Sheppard Avenue, Bayview, Bessarion, and Leslie station.
