= List of tallest buildings in Alberta =

This is a list of the tallest buildings in Alberta that ranks skyscrapers and high-rise buildings in the province of Alberta, Canada, by height. Buildings in two cities are included in this list; Calgary and Edmonton, each having buildings taller than 100 m (330 ft). The tallest building outside of Calgary and Edmonton is the 54.1 m (177 ft) tall T. Russell Haig Tower located in Lethbridge. The tallest building in the province is the 66-storey, 250.8 m (823 ft) tall, Stantec Tower located in Edmonton.

Alberta's history of skyscrapers began with the Grain Exchange Building (1910) in Calgary, and the Tegler Building (1911) in Edmonton.

Until late 2013, the presence of aircraft taking off and landing at the Edmonton City Centre Airport restricted any building from reaching an elevation higher than 815.34 metres (2,675.0 ft) above mean sea level, about 150 metres (490 ft) above downtown.

== Tallest buildings ==
This list ranks buildings in Alberta that stand at least 100 metres (330 ft) tall, based on CTBUH height measurement standards. This includes spires and architectural details but does not include antenna masts. An equal sign (=) following a rank indicates the same height between two or more buildings. Freestanding observation and/or telecommunication towers, while not habitable buildings, are included for comparison purposes; however, they are not ranked. One such tower is the Calgary Tower.

Rank	Building	Image	Location	Height	Floors	Year	Notes	Ref
1	Stantec Tower	Stantec Tower	Edmonton	250.9 m (823.2 ft)	66	2019	Tallest building in Western Canada.	
2	Brookfield Place East	Brookfield Place East	Calgary	247 m (810 ft)	56	2017	Tallest office building in Western Canada.	
3	The Bow	The Bow	Calgary	237.5 m (779 ft)	58	2012		
4	Telus Sky	Telus Sky	Calgary	222.3 m (729 ft)	59	2019		
5	Suncor Energy Centre - West	Suncor Energy Centre	Calgary	215.2 m (706 ft)	53	1984		
6	Eighth Avenue Place I	Eighth Avenue Place	Calgary	212 m (697 ft)	51	2011		
N/A	CICT-DT TV Tower 1		Calgary	204.2 m (670 ft)	-	1954	Tallest structure in Alberta from 1954 to 1984.	
7	Bankers Hall - West	Bankers Hall - West	Calgary	197 m (646 ft)	52	2000		
8	Bankers Hall - East	Bankers Hall - East	Calgary	197 m (646 ft)	52	1989		
9	JW Marriott Edmonton Ice District & Residences	JW Marriott Edmonton	Edmonton	192.15 m (630.4 ft)	56	2018		
N/A	Calgary Tower	Tower from below	Calgary	191 m (627 ft)	-	1968	Tallest freestanding structure in Alberta from 1968 to 1984.	
10	Centennial Place - East	Centennial Place	Calgary	182 m (597 ft)	41	2010		
11	Eighth Avenue Place II		Calgary	177 m (581 ft)	41	2014		
12	TransCanada Tower	TransCanada Tower	Calgary	170 m (560 ft)	38	2001		
13	Jamieson Place	Jamieson Place	Calgary	170 m (560 ft)	38	2009		
14	Canterra Tower	Canterra Tower	Calgary	169 m (554 ft)	45	1988		
15	First Canadian Centre	First Canadian Centre	Calgary	161 m (528 ft)	41	1982		
16	Western Canadian Place - North	Western Canadian Place North	Calgary	160 m (520 ft)	41	1983		
17	Stephen Avenue Place	Scotia Centre	Calgary	160 m (520 ft)	41	1976		
18	City Centre I		Calgary	158 m (518 ft)	37	2016		
19	801 Seventh Building	801 7th Avenue Building	Calgary	155 m (509 ft)	37	1982		
20	TD Canada Trust Tower	TD Canada Trust Tower	Calgary	154 m (505 ft)	40	1991		
21	West Village Towers West		Calgary	152 m (499 ft)	41	2021	Tallest residential buildings in Alberta.	
22	West Village Towers East		Calgary	152 m (499 ft)	41	2021		
23	Epcor Tower	Epcor Tower	Edmonton	149.4 m (490 ft)	28	2011		
24	The Guardian North		Calgary	147 m (482 ft)	44	2016		
25	The Guardian South		Calgary	147 m (482 ft)	44	2016		
26	Bow Valley Square 2	Bow Valley Square	Calgary	147 m (482 ft)	39	1975		
27	Manulife Place	Manulife Place	Edmonton	146.4 m (480 ft)	36	1983		
28	Dome Tower	Dome Tower	Calgary	146 m (479 ft)	35	1977		
29	Arris Residences		Calgary	142 m (466 ft)	38	2024		
30	Home Oil Tower	Home Oil Tower	Calgary	142 m (466 ft)	34	1977		
31	Shell Centre	Shell Centre	Calgary	142 m (466 ft)	33	1977		
32	Bow Valley Square 4	Bow Valley Square	Calgary	140 m (460 ft)	37	1981		
33	Eleven		Calgary	138 m (453 ft)	44	2022		
34	Suncor Energy Centre - East	Petro-Canada Centre	Calgary	138 m (453 ft)	33	1984		
35	Encore Tower	Encore Tower	Edmonton	138 m (453 ft)	43	2019	Tallest residential building in Edmonton.	
36	TELUS House Edmonton	TELUShouse	Edmonton	134.4 m (441 ft)	33	1971	Tallest office building in Edmonton.	
37	Two Park Central		Calgary	134 m (440 ft)	39	2024		
38	Fifth Avenue Place East	Fifth Avenue Place East	Calgary	133 m (436 ft)	35	1981		
39	Fifth Avenue Place West	Fifth Avenue Place West	Calgary	133 m (436 ft)	35	1981		
40	Bell Tower	Bell Tower	Edmonton	129.9 m (426 ft)	31	1982		
41	Edmonton Tower	Edmonton Tower	Edmonton	129.84 m (426.0 ft)	29	2016		
42	The Pearl	The Pearl	Edmonton	127 m (417 ft)	36	2014		
43	Fifth and Fifth Building		Calgary	127 m (417 ft)	33	1980		
44	715 Fifth	Hewlett Packard Tower	Calgary	125 m (410 ft)	31	1975		
44	Calgary Courts Centre	Calgary Courts Centre	Calgary	125 m (410 ft)	26	2007		
45	Vogue		Calgary	125 m (410 ft)	36	2017		
46	707 Fifth	707 Fifth Avenue	Calgary	125 m (410 ft)	27	2017		
47	Arriva 34	Arriva Tower	Calgary	124 m (407 ft)	34	2007		
48	Western Canadian Place - South	Western Canadian Place South	Calgary	124 m (407 ft)	32	1983		
49	KPMG Tower		Calgary	124 m (407 ft)	30	1988		
50	Edmonton House	Edmonton House	Edmonton	123 m (404 ft)	45	1971		
51	Bow Valley Square 3		Calgary	123 m (404 ft)	32	1979		
52	Altius Centre	Altius Centre	Calgary	123 m (404 ft)	32	1973		
53	The Edison	EnCana Place	Calgary	123 m (404 ft)	28	1982		
54	Commerce Place	Commerce Place	Edmonton	123 m (404 ft)	27	1990		
55	Five West East Tower	Five West East Tower	Calgary	123 m (404 ft)	28	2008		
56	The Oliver West		Calgary	121 m (397 ft)				
57	The Parks West		Edmonton	121 m (397 ft)				
58	Nuera		Calgary	120 m (390 ft)	34	2010		
59	Canadian Western Bank Place	CWB Place	Edmonton	120 m (390 ft)	30	1980		
60	Versus West Tower		Calgary	118 m (387 ft)	34	2016		
61	Upten		Calgary	118 m (387 ft)	37	2020		
62	Sodo		Calgary	118 m (387 ft)	36	2019		
63	MNP Tower	MNP Tower	Edmonton	117.6 m (386 ft)	27	1978		
64	TD Tower	TD Tower	Edmonton	116.7 m (383 ft)	27	1976		
65	Stock Exchange Tower	Stock Exchange Tower	Calgary	115 m (377 ft)	31	1979		
66	Rice Howard 1	Scotia Place 1	Edmonton	113.2 m (371 ft)	28	1982		
67	Icon II	Icon Towers	Edmonton	112.3 m (368 ft)	35	2010		
68	CN Tower	CN Tower	Edmonton	110.9 m (364 ft)	26	1966	First building in Alberta to exceed a height of 100m.	
69	Enbridge Centre	Enbridge Centre	Edmonton	110.6 m (363 ft)	25	2016		
70	Ultima	Ultima	Edmonton	107.9 m (354 ft)	32	2016		
71	Sun Life Place	Sun Life Place	Edmonton	107.7 m (353 ft)	25	1978		
72	Fox Two	Fox Two	Edmonton	107.3 m (352 ft)	33	2017		
73	Hendrix	Hendrix	Edmonton	103.6 m (340 ft)	29	2016		
74	Oxford Tower	Oxford Tower	Edmonton	102.9 m (338 ft)	23	1974		

== Timeline of tallest buildings ==
This is a list of buildings that in the past held the title of tallest building in Alberta.

Name	Image	Location	Years as tallest	Height m / ft	Floors	Ref
Tegler Building	Tegler Building	Edmonton	1911–1913	24 m (79 ft)	8	
Alberta Legislature Building	Alberta Legislature	Edmonton	1913–1914	57 m (187 ft)	5	
Fairmont Palliser Hotel	Fairmont Palliser Hotel	Calgary	1914–1960	60.05 m (197.0 ft)	12	
Elveden House	Elveden House	Calgary	1960–1966	79.9 m (262 ft)	20	
CN Tower	CN Tower	Edmonton	1966–1971	110.92 m (363.9 ft)	26	
TELUS House (originally AGT Tower)	Telus House	Edmonton	1971–1974	134.4 m (441 ft)	33	
Bow Valley Square 2	Bow Valley Square	Calgary	1974–1976	143 m (469 ft)	39	
Scotia Centre	Scotia Centre	Calgary	1976–1982	155.1 m (509 ft)	41	
First Canadian Centre	First Canadian Centre	Calgary	1982–1984	167 m (548 ft)	41	
Suncor Energy Centre - West	Suncor Energy Centre	Calgary	1984–2011	214.9 m (705 ft)	53	
The Bow	The Bow	Calgary	2011–2017	235.9 m (774 ft)	58	
Brookfield Place East	Brookfield Place East	Calgary	2017–2018	246.9 m (810 ft)	56	
Stantec Tower	Stantec Tower	Edmonton	2018–present	250.9 m (823 ft)	66	

== See also ==
- Architecture of Canada
- List of tallest buildings in Calgary
- List of tallest buildings in Edmonton
- List of tallest buildings in Canada
