= Shell Centre (Calgary) =

Office Tower in Calgary, Alberta

400 4th Avenue (formerly Shell Centre)
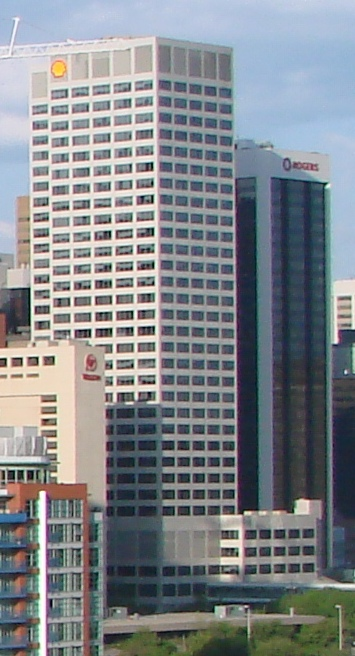
- Interactive map of the 400 4th Avenue (formerly Shell Centre) area

General information
- Type: Office
- Location: 400 4 Avenue SW, Calgary
- Coordinates: 51°05′00.2″N 114°07′30.8″W
- Construction started: 1975
- Completed: 1977
- Owner: Cadillac Fairview

Height
- Roof: 140 m (460 ft)

Technical details
- Floor count: 33
- Floor area: 630,000 sq ft (59,000 m^{2})
- Lifts/elevators: 15

Design and construction
- Architect: WZMH Architects
- Developer: Olympia and York

Other information
- Parking: 86

Shell Centre was a 33-storey, 140 m (460 ft) office tower in Calgary, Alberta, Canada. At completion in 1977, Shell Centre was the fourth tallest building in Calgary, behind TD Square Dome Tower, Bow Valley Square Two, and Stephen Avenue Place. The building was renamed 400 4th Avenue in 2024, when Shell Canada moved their offices to the Bow building in Calgary, AB. Shell removed their logo in October 2023 before moving offices.

Shell Centre was announced by Olympia and York Developments in February 1975 as a $35-million, 33-storey, 630,000 sq ft (59,000 m^{2}) tower to be built on the site of the former Caravan Hotel. The building would be Olympia and York's first development in Western Canada, which went ahead despite the absence of a major tenant at announcement. During construction of the building Shell Oil would step forward to become the primary tenant for the building in a plan that would consolidate the oil company's 1,000 employees in Calgary, and changing the name of the building to Shell Centre. Shell Centre's design called for 34,000 cubic yards of concrete and 4,700 tons of steel in construction, and the structure was cladded with 1.25 inch think slabs of Italian granite. The building included one level of underground parking with capacity for 86 cars. The building was designed in a figure eight shape which allows for eight corner offices, and includes a recessed lobby accessible from street levels behind a series of supportive pillars. The Calgary Herald would note the tower marked a turning point in corporate offices in Calgary, moving away from the traditional simple towers which were previously common in the city, to more elaborate and flamboyant skins of marble and granite which were common in American cities.

== See also ==
- List of tallest buildings in Calgary
