= List of tallest buildings in Calgary =

Skyline of Calgary
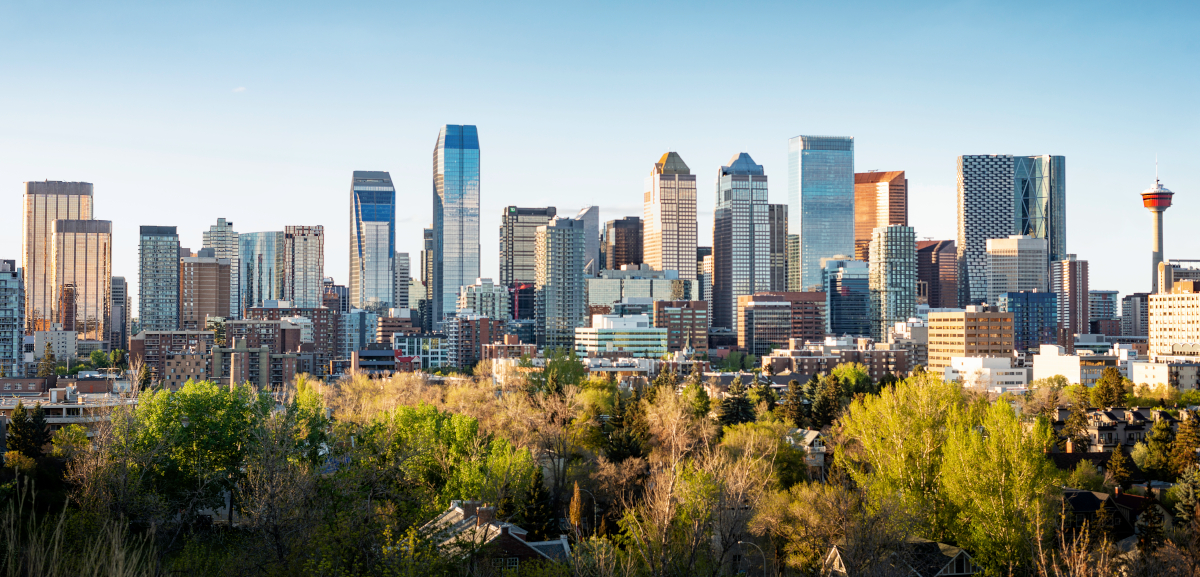
- Downtown Calgary in 2020
- Tallest building: Brookfield Place (2017)
- Tallest building height: 247 m (810 ft)
- First 150 m+ building: Scotia Centre (1976)

Number of tall buildings (2026)
- Taller than 100 m (328 ft): 83
- Taller than 150 m (492 ft): 20
- Taller than 200 m (656 ft): 5

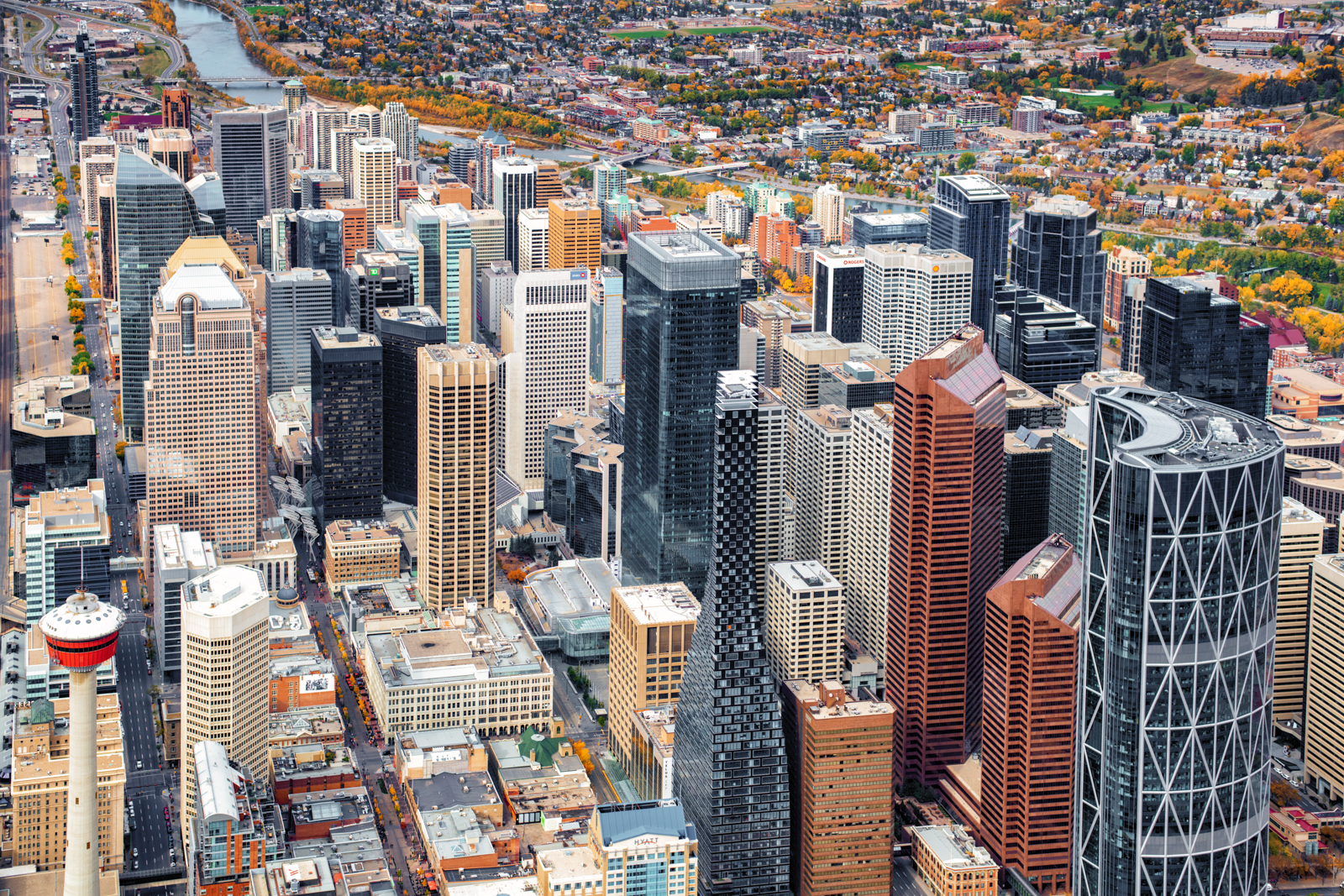
Downtown Calgary in 2021, with Calgary's four tallest buildings in the bottom right

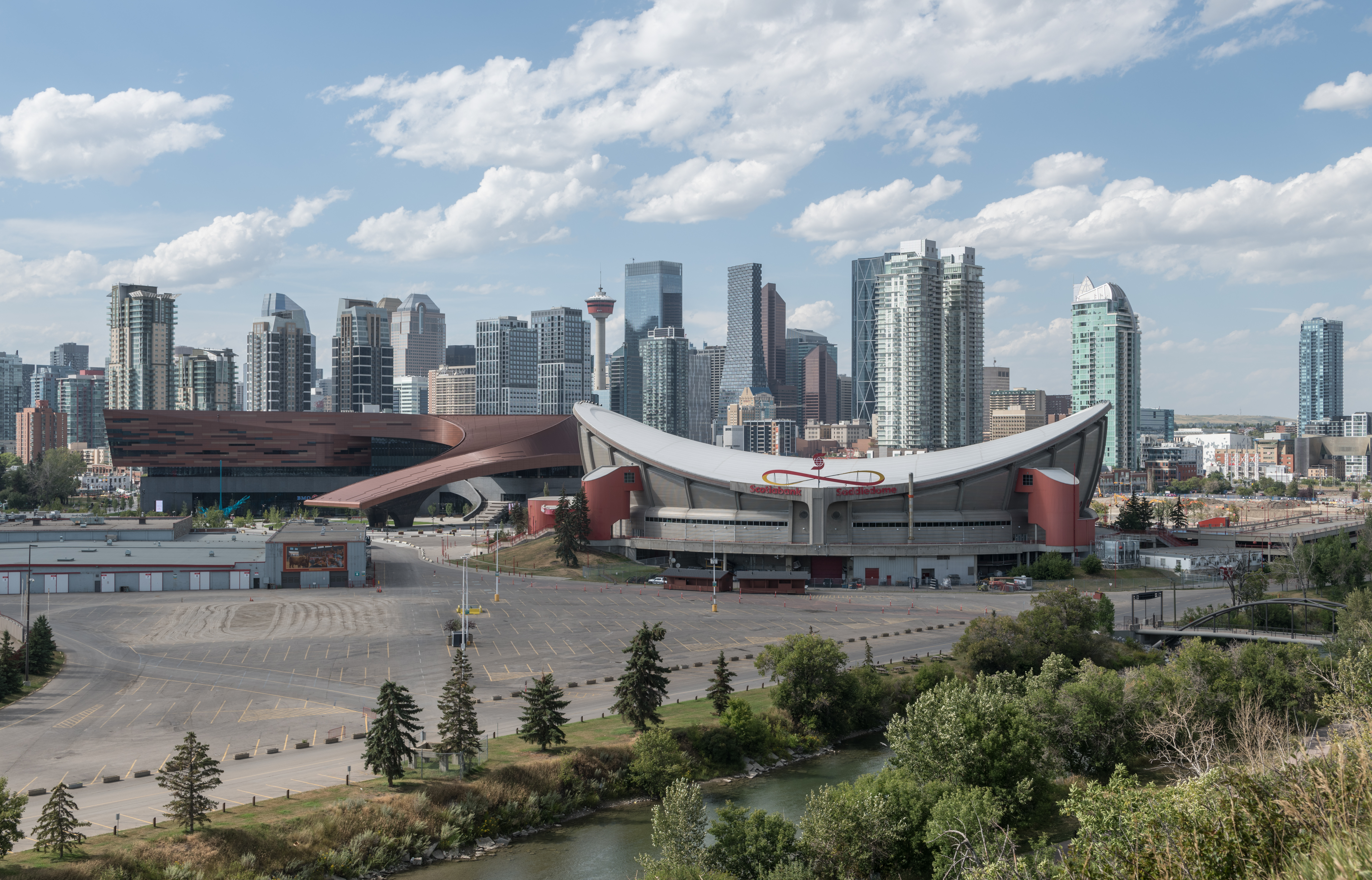
The skyline behind the BMO Centre and the Saddledome in 2024

Calgary is the most populous city in the Canadian province of Alberta, with a metropolitan area population of 1,836,012 as of 2025. Calgary is the third-largest city and the fifth-largest metropolitan area in Canada; the city is a major energy, manufacturing, logistics, and financial centre in Western Canada. Standing at 56 stories and 247 m (810 ft), Brookfield Place is the tallest building in Calgary. The 56-storey office tower was built in 2017. The second-tallest building in the city is The Bow, at a height of 236 m (774 ft). As of 2026, Calgary is home to 83 buildings taller than 100 metres (328 ft). 20 of them are taller than 150 metres (492 feet). In those respects, it has more skyscrapers than any other municipality in Western Canada, more than the city of Vancouver or Burnaby, and the second most of any city in the country overall after Toronto.

Calgary's history of towers began with the Grain Exchange Building (1910), the Fairmont Palliser Hotel (1914), and the Elveden Centre (1960–1964). Building construction remained slow in the city until the early 1970s. From 1970 to 1990, Calgary witnessed a major expansion of skyscraper and high-rise construction. Many of the city's office towers were completed during this period, such as the First Canadian Centre and the Canterra Tower office towers. A ten-year lull in building construction came after the expansion, though Calgary experienced a larger second building expansion beginning in the late 90s, which has continued to the early 2020s.

Calgary has a relatively large skyline for its population. Almost all of Calgary's high-rises are located in or adjacent to Downtown Calgary, forming a dense core bounded to the north by the Bow River and Prince's Island Park. The city has height restrictions that prevent any building from casting a shadow over the Bow River and the city hall; however, shadows during winter months are excluded from this limit. While not a habitable building, the Calgary Tower, completed in 1967 at a height of 190.9 m (626 ft), is a major landmark on the skyline.

== History ==
Number of buildings by height in Calgary by the end of each year. Click on the legend to toggle a specific height on or off. View chart definition.

=== 1900s–1960s ===
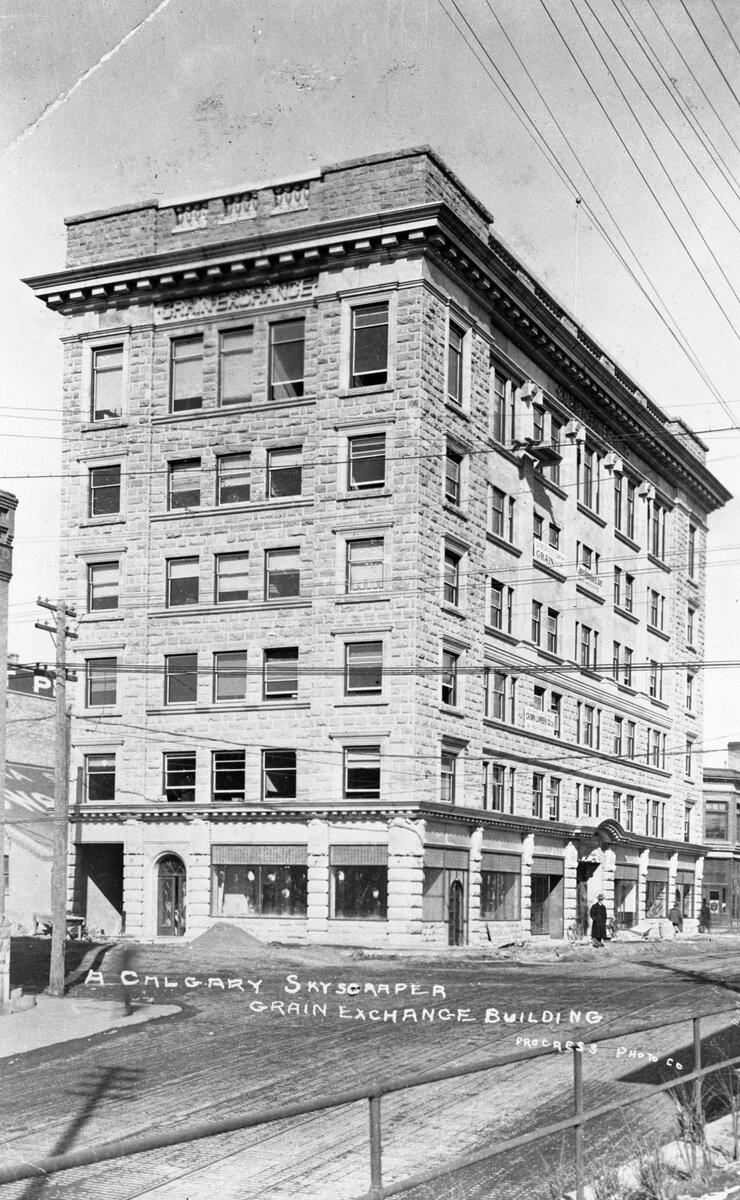
The Grain Exchange Building, the first building in Calgary with an elevator

Among the earliest multi-storey buildings to be built in Calgary was the Grain Exchange Building, a six-storey building completed in 1908. Considered a tall building at the time, it was the tallest building in the city upon completion, and functioned as a hub for grain businesses. It also contained Calgary's first passenger elevator. The city's rapid growth cemented it as a major trading centre in Western Canada, and an influx of tourists encouraged the construction of the Fairmont Palliser Hotel in 1914. Originally built to eight storeys, four additional floors were added in 1929 to accommodate the city's further growth.

With few high-rises built in the first half of the 20th century, Fairmont Palliser Hotel stood as tallest building in Calgary for over four decades, until the completion of Elveden House in 1960. Elveden House formed the tallest component of a complex of three linked high-rise office towers. More office buildings were constructed throughout the 1960s to host the city's increasing demand for office space, particularly its growing energy industry. One Calgary Place, completed in 1968, became the city's tallest building and the first in Calgary to exceed 100 m (328 ft) in height. In the same year, the Calgary Tower opened to the public as an observation tower. Built to honor Canada's centennial year of 1967 and to encourage urban renewal and growth of downtown Calgary, the tower was by far the tallest structure in the city upon completion.

=== 1970s–1980s ===
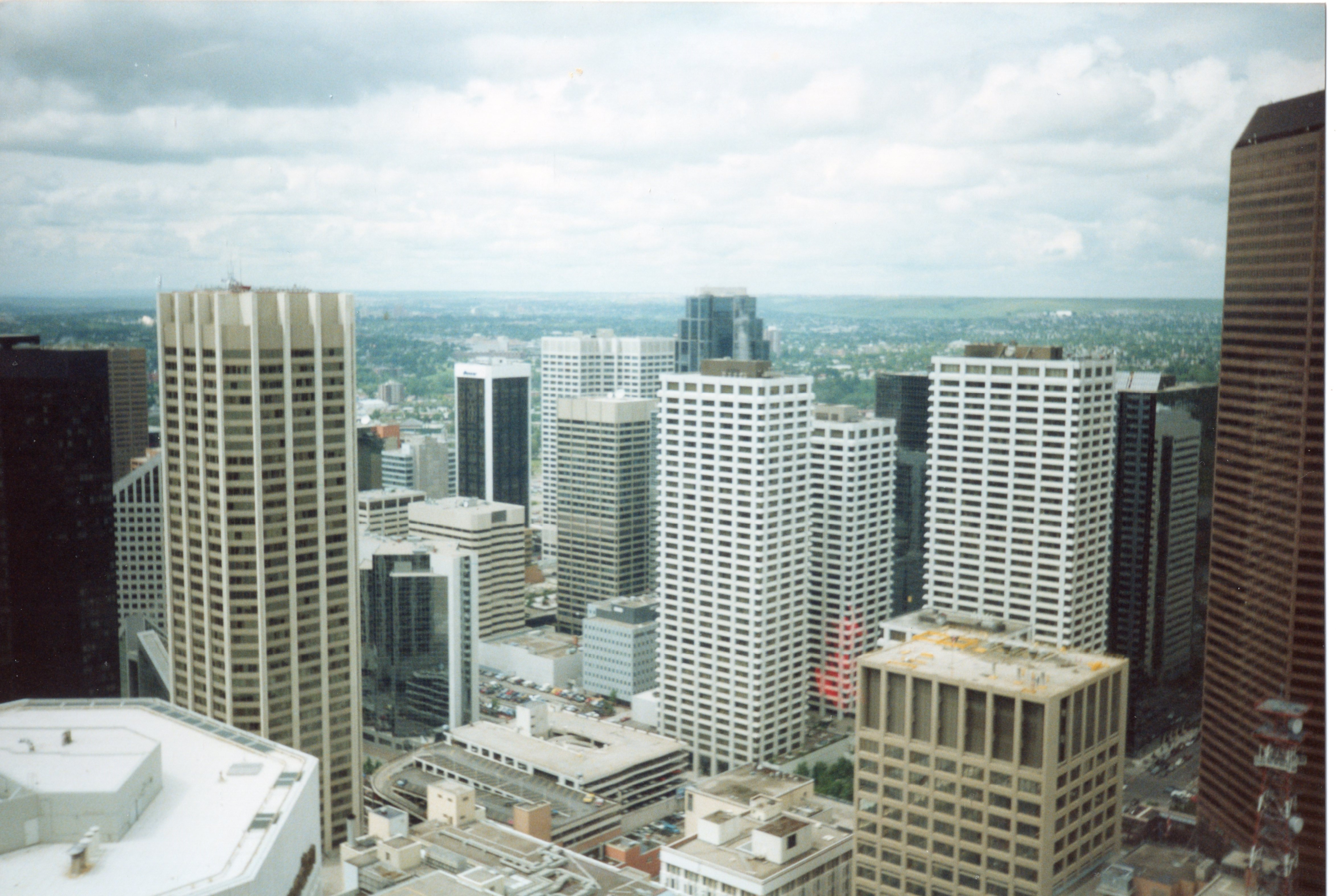
A portion of the skyline as viewed from Calgary Tower in 1991, featuring Bow Valley Square prominently

With a booming population, Calgary witnessed a major expansion of skyscraper and high-rise construction in the 1970s, mostly in commercial skyscrapers. The title of the city's tallest building was broken three times in this decade: first by Altius Centre in 1973, then by Bow Valley Square 2 in 1975, and finally by the Scotia Centre (now known as the Stephen Avenue Place) in 1976. Other significant high-rises include the Toronto-Dominion Square complex in 1977, with a large botanical garden at its base.

The record of Calgary's tallest building was broken a further two more times in the 1980s, as the boom in office construction continued. First Canadian Centre was completed in 1982, at a height of 166.7 m (547 ft). It was planned as the shorter building of a two-tower development; however, due to the early 1980s recession, the taller 64-storey skyscraper was never built. The last building in the Bow Valley Square complex was completed in 1982, a significant addition to the centre of the skyline. The twin towers of Western Canadian Place, built in 1983, expanded the skyline further southwest.

In 1984, the Petro-Canada Centre complex was completed, the western tower becoming Calgary's tallest building at 215 m (705 ft). The building also surpassed Calgary Tower as the city's tallest free-standing structure, and would remain so for 21 years. The complex, primarily occupied by Petro-Canada, proved controversial, as Petro-Canada was a federal Crown Corporation created under Prime Minister Pierre Trudeau's National Energy Program. Later Premier Peter Lougheed would blame the complex for the collapse of the Calgary real-estate boom due to oversupply. The centre was privatized in 1991.

=== 1990s–2000s ===
Following the completion of the TD Canada Trust Tower, construction of new office high-rises in Calgary slowed down significantly. Construction picked up towards the late 1990s. Some of the first skyscrapers from this later boom were the twin buildings of the Bankers Hall complex. Unlike many of Calgary's earlier skyscrapers, the skyscrapers were in a postmodernist architectural style. TransCanada Tower was completed in 2001 as the headquarters of TC Energy, reflecting the city's importance for the energy and hydrocarbon industry.

The 2000s also saw a diversification in high-rise usage, with a court facility, Calgary Courts Centre, built in 2007. Arriva 34 became Calgary's tallest residential high-rise in 2008, with a height of 128 m (420 ft), and marked an extension of the skyline towards the southeast; Five West East Tower, nearly as tall, was completed in the same year.

=== 2010s–present ===
The 2010s saw Calgary's skyline reach greater heights than ever before. The Bow, completed in 2012 at 236 m (774 ft) tall, dethroned the Petro-Canada Centre, renamed the Suncor Energy Centre in 2009, as the city's tallest building. Its distinctive crescent shape forms a notable peak towards the east of the skyline. The Bow Tower was originally proposed to be at least 1,000 feet tall, but the height was reduced to comply with the city's height restrictions along the Bow River, for which the building is named. Only four years later in 2016, Brookfield Place would succeed it as the city's tallest building, a title it holds today. The latest significant commercial skyscraper in Calgary, the mixed-use Telus Sky, was completed in 2020. Currently the city's third tallest building, Telus Sky is notable for its distinctive, "twisting" massing and pixelated facade. Since 2020, no more office skyscrapers exceeding 120 m (394 ft) have been built.

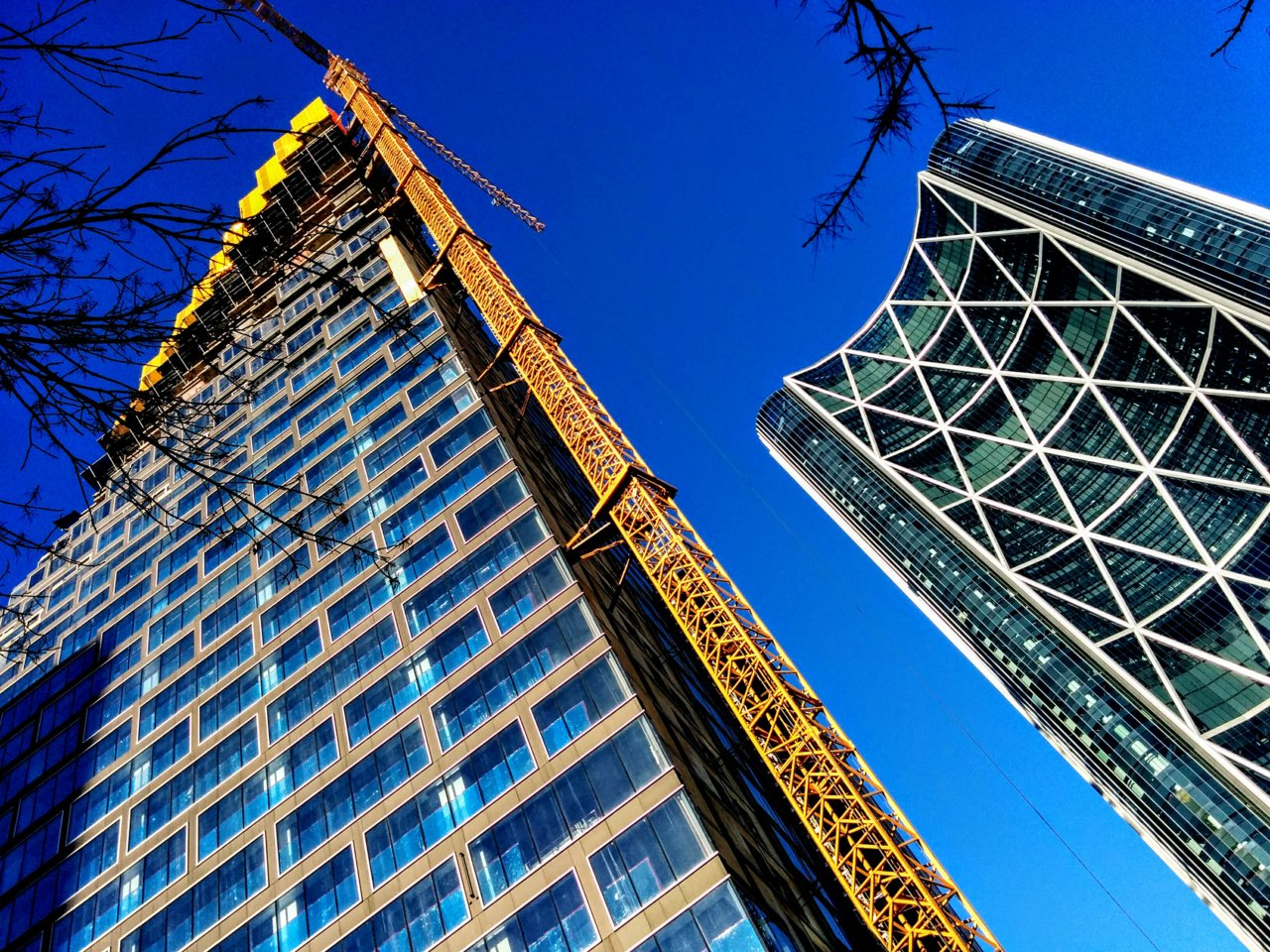
Telus Sky under construction in 2018 (left) and The Bow (right)

Residential high-rise construction has become increasingly commonplace since the 2010s. The Guardian, a two-tower residential complex built in 2016, adjoins Arriva 34, increasing the skyline's presence in the Victoria Park neighbourhood. The skyline has also extended towards Downtown East Village, particularly with the completion of the 142 m (466 ft) tall Arris Residences in 2024. High-rise development has also spread southwards, towards the Beltline, with residential towers such as Two Park Central and The Oliver West, both completed in 2024. Currently under construction further south is the 29-storey 4th Street Lofts. The skyline is extending westwards as well, especially with the completion of the West Village Towers in 2021, now the joint tallest buildings in Downtown West End at 150 m (492 ft). This was followed by Eleven in 2024. Further west, in the neighbourhood of Sunalta, the 27-storey Sunalta Heights was completed in 2024.

In July 2025, a proposal was made for pair of mixed-use skyscrapers with hotel and residential components near the BMO Centre. It is reported that both towers will be taller than Brookfield Place East. If so, the taller 69-story component would become Calgary's tallest building, and the tallest in Alberta and Western Canada as well, surpassing Edmonton's Stantec Tower. They are expected to be completed by 2030. If built, they would mark a shift in the skyline's focal point from Downtown Calgary to Victoria Park.

== Map of tallest buildings ==
This map shows the location of buildings in Calgary that are taller than 100 m (328 ft). Each marker is coloured by the decade of the building's completion. There is only one building taller than 100 m located outside the scope of the map: Ovation at Westgate Park.

Buildings taller than 100 m (394 ft) in Downtown Calgary. An asterisk (*) next to the name of the building indicates it is located outside the map.
- 1960s
- 1970s
- 1980s
- 1990s
- 2000s
- 2010s
- 2020s
1 Brookfield Place East
2 The Bow
3 Telus Sky
4 Suncor Energy Centre - West
5 Eighth Avenue Place I
6 Bankers Hall - West
7 Bankers Hall - East
8 Centennial Place - East
9 Eighth Avenue Place II
10 Canterra Tower
11 TransCanada Tower
12 Jamieson Place
13 First Canadian Centre
14 Western Canadian Place - North
15 TD Canada Trust Tower
16 City Centre I
17 Stephen Avenue Place
18 801 Seventh Building
19 West Village Towers I
20 West Village Towers II
21 The Guardian North
22 The Guardian South
23 Bow Valley Square 2
24 The Arris Residences
25 Dome Tower
26 Fifth and Fifth Building
27 Shell Centre
28 Eleven
29 Home Oil Tower
30 Two Park Central
31 Bow Valley Square 4
32 Fifth Avenue Place East
33 Fifth Avenue Place West
34 Suncor Energy Centre - East
35 Calgary Courts Centre
36 Western Canadian Place - South
37 Arriva 34
38 Altius Centre
39 The Edison
40 Vogue
41 240 Fourth
42 Stock Exchange Tower
43 Hewlett Packard Tower
44 707 Fifth
45 Five West East Tower
46 Three Bow Valley Square
47 The Oliver West
48 Nuera
49 Versus West Tower
50 UPTEN
51 SODO
52 District
53 Centennial Place II
54 BLVD Beltline North
55 The Ampersand East
56 Vetro at Sasso
57 AMEC Place
58 The Royal at Mount Royal Village
59 Residence Inn by Marriott Beltline
60 Mark on Tenth
61 First Tower
62 Millennium Tower
63 The Ampersand North
64 The Ampersand West
65 One Calgary Place
66 Alura at Nuera
67 Encor Place
68 Park Point South
69 The Oliver East
70 WaterMark Tower
71 Palliser One
72 6 and Tenth
73 One Park Central
74 BLVD Beltline South
75 Calgary Place Apartments East
76 Calgary Place Apartments West
77 Pulse at Evolution
78 635 8 Avenue
79 Ovation at Westgate Park*
80 Five West Tower I
81 Mount Royal House
82 The Montana
83 Eau Claire Tower

== Cityscape ==
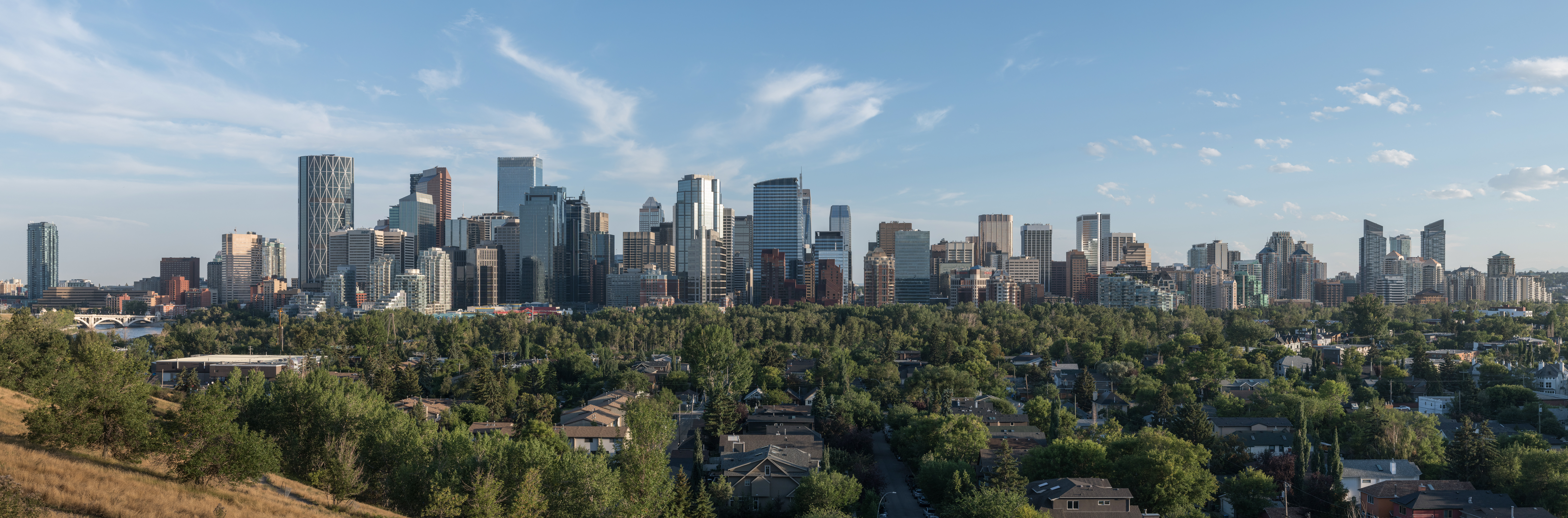
Calgary's skyline, as viewed from McHugh Bluff in 2024

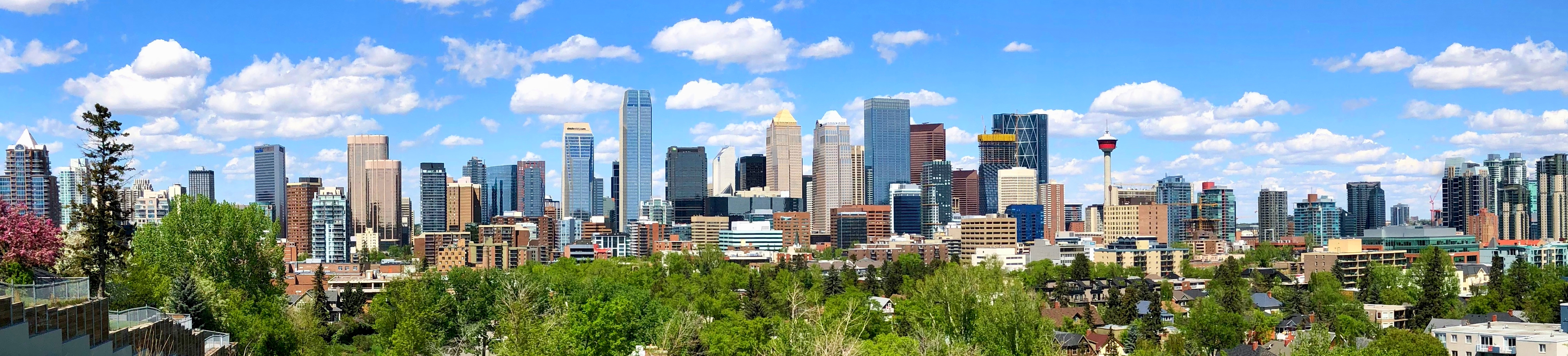
Downtown Calgary from the south in May 2018, with Telus Sky under construction

== Tallest buildings ==
This list ranks buildings in Calgary that stand at least 100 metres (328 feet) tall as of 2026, based on standard height measurement. This includes spires and architectural details but does not include antenna masts. The “Year” column indicates the year of completion. Buildings tied in height are sorted by year of completion with earlier buildings ranked first, and then alphabetically. Freestanding observation and/or telecommunication towers, while not habitable buildings, are included for comparison purposes; however, they are not ranked. One such tower is the Calgary Tower.

Was the tallest building in Calgary upon completion

| Rank | Name | Image | Location | Height m (ft) | Floors | Year | Purpose | Notes |
|---|---|---|---|---|---|---|---|---|
| 1 | Brookfield Place East | Brookfield Place East | 210 7 Avenue SW 51°02′50″N 114°03′58″W | 247 (810) | 56 | 2017 | Office | Tallest building in Calgary. Tallest building completed in Calgary in the 2010s. |
| 2 | The Bow | The Bow | 500 Centre Street S 51°02′53″N 114°03′43″W | 237.5 (779) | 58 | 2012 | Office | Tallest building in Calgary from 2012 until 2017, when it was overtaken by Brookfield Place East. |
| 3 | Telus Sky | Telus Sky | 619 Centre Street S 51°02′48″N 114°03′49″W | 225.4 (740) | 60 | 2020 | Mixed-use | Tallest building completed in Calgary in the 2020s. Tallest mixed-use building in Calgary. |
| 4 | Suncor Energy Centre - West | Suncor Energy Centre | 150 6 Avenue SW 51°02′53″N 114°03′53″W | 215.2 (706) | 53 | 1984 | Office | Tallest building in Calgary from 1984 until 2012, when it was overtaken by The Bow. |
| 5 | Eighth Avenue Place I | | 525 8 Avenue SW 51°02′43″N 114°04′21″W | 212.3 (697) | 51 | 2011 | Office | |
| 6 | Bankers Hall - West | Bankers Hall - West | 888 3 Street SW 51°02′43″N 114°04′10″W | 197 (646) | 52 | 2000 | Office | Tallest building completed in the 2000s in Calgary. |
| 7 | Bankers Hall - East | Bankers Hall - East | 855 2 Street SW 51°02′43″N 114°04′06″W | 197 (646) | 52 | 1989 | Office | |
| N/A | Calgary Tower | Tower from below | 101 9th Avenue SW 51°02′40″N 114°03′47″W | 191 (627) | N/A | 1968 | Observation | Not a habitable building. Included for comparison purposes |
| 8 | Centennial Place - East | Centennial Place | 520 3rd Avenue SW 51°03′03″N 114°04′20″W | 182.6 (599) | 41 | 2010 | Office | Also known as Centennial Place I. |
| 9 | Canterra Tower | Canterra Tower | 400 3 Avenue SW 51°03′04″N 114°04′15″W | 177 (581) | 45 | 1988 | Office | |
| 10 | TransCanada Tower | TransCanada Tower | 450 1 Street SW 51°02′57″N 114°03′52″W | 177 (581) | 38 | 2001 | Office | |
| 11 | Eighth Avenue Place II | Eighth Avenue Place II | 585 8 Avenue SW 51°02′44″N 114°04′24″W | 176.7 (580) | 41 | 2014 | Office | Also known as Eighth Avenue Place West Tower. |
| 12 | Jamieson Place | Jamieson Place | 308 4 Avenue SW 51°02′59″N 114°04′05″W | 172 (564) | 38 | 2009 | Office | |
| 13 | First Canadian Centre | First Canadian Centre | 350 7 Avenue SW 51°02′50″N 114°04′12″W | 167 (548) | 41 | 1982 | Office | Tallest building in Calgary from 1982 to 1984. |
| 14 | Western Canadian Place - North | Western Canadian Place North | 707 8 Avenue SW 51°02′44″N 114°04′38″W | 164 (538) | 41 | 1983 | Office | |
| 15 | TD Canada Trust Tower | TD Canada Trust Tower | 421 7 Avenue SW 51°02′48″N 114°04′15″W | 162 (531) | 40 | 1991 | Office | |
| 16 | City Centre I | City Centre I | 215 2 Street SW 51°03′03″N 114°04′05″W | 162 (531) | 37 | 2016 | Office | |
| 17 | Stephen Avenue Place | Scotia Centre | 700 2 Street SW 51°02′47″N 114°04′03″W | 155 (509) | 41 | 1976 | Office | Formerly known as the Scotia Centre. Tallest building in Calgary from 1976 to 1982. Tallest building completed in the 1970s. |
| 18 | 801 Seventh Building | 801 7th Avenue Building | 801 7 Avenue SW 51°02′48″N 114°04′45″W | 153 (502) | 37 | 1982 | Office | |
| 19 | West Village Towers I | West Village Towers I | 850 11 St SW 51°02′44″N 114°05′18″W | 150 (490) | 41 | 2021 | Residential | Joint tallest residential buildings in Calgary. |
| 20 | West Village Towers II | West Village Towers II | 850 11 St SW 51°02′44″N 114°05′12″W | 150 (490) | 41 | 2021 | Residential | Joint tallest residential buildings in Calgary. |
| 21 | The Guardian North | The Guardian North | 1122 3 St SE 51°02′31″N 114°03′19″W | 147 (482) | 44 | 2016 | Residential | Joint tallest building in the Beltline |
| 22 | The Guardian South | The Guardian South | 1188 11 Ave SE 51°02′29″N 114°03′20″W | 147 (482) | 44 | 2016 | Residential | Joint tallest building in the Beltline |
| 23 | Bow Valley Square 2 | Bow Valley Square | 205 5 Avenue SW 51°02′54″N 114°03′57″W | 143 (469) | 39 | 1975 | Office | |
| 24 | Arris Residences | – | 530 3 Street SE 51°02′51″N 114°03′18″W | 142.1 (466) | 39 | 2024 | Residential | |
| 25 | Dome Tower | Dome Tower | 333 7 Avenue SW 51°02′47″N 114°04′09″W | 141 (463) | 35 | 1977 | Office | |
| 26 | Fifth and Fifth Building | | 505 5 Avenue SW 51°02′55″N 114°04′28″W | 140 (460) | 34 | 1980 | Office | |
| 27 | Shell Centre | Shell Centre | 4 Avenue SW 51°03′00″N 114°04′15″W | 140 (460) | 33 | 1977 | Office | |
| 28 | Eleven | Eleven Tower | 1055 11 St SW 51°02′36″N 114°05′21″W | 138 (453) | 44 | 2022 | Residential | |
| 29 | Home Oil Tower | Home Oil Tower | 324 8 Avenue SW 51°02′45″N 114°04′09″W | 137 (449) | 34 | 1977 | Office | |
| 30 | Two Park Central | – | 1111 4 Street SW 51°02′33″N 114°04′20″W | 134.1 (440) | 39 | 2024 | Residential | |
| 31 | Bow Valley Square 4 | Bow Valley Square | 205 5 Avenue SW 51°02′52″N 114°04′01″W | 134 (440) | 37 | 1981 | Office | |
| 32 | Fifth Avenue Place East | Fifth Avenue Place East | 425 1 Street SW 51°02′57″N 114°03′57″W | 133 (436) | 35 | 1981 | Office | |
| 33 | Fifth Avenue Place West | Fifth Avenue Place West | 237 4 Avenue SW 51°02′57″N 114°04′01″W | 133 (436) | 35 | 1981 | Office | |
| 34 | Suncor Energy Centre - East | Petro-Canada Centre | 111 5 Avenue SW 51°02′53″N 114°03′48″W | 130 (430) | 33 | 1984 | Office | |
| 35 | Calgary Courts Centre | Calgary Courts Centre | 601 5th Street SW 51°02′51″N 114°04′28″W | 129 (423) | 26 | 2007 | Government/ Office | |
| 36 | Western Canadian Place - South | Western Canadian Place South | 707 8 Avenue SW 51°02′43″N 114°04′37″W | 128 (420) | 32 | 1983 | Office | |
| 37 | Arriva 34 | Arriva Tower | 1111 Olympic Way SE 51°02′31″N 114°03′14″W | 128 (420) | 34 | 2008 | Residential | Also stylized as arriVa. |
| 38 | Altius Centre | Altius Centre | 500 4 Avenue SW 51°02′59″N 114°04′19″W | 126 (413) | 32 | 1973 | Office | |
| 39 | The Edison | EnCana Place | 150 9 Ave SW 51°02′42″N 114°03′52″W | 125 (410) | 31 | 1982 | Office | |
| 40 | Vogue | Vogue | 930 6th Avenue SW 51°02′54″N 114°04′57″W | 125 (410) | 36 | 2017 | Residential | |
| 41 | 240 Fourth | – | 240 4 Avenue SW 51°03′00″N 114°04′02″W | 124.1 (407) | 30 | 1988 | Office | |
| 42 | Stock Exchange Tower | Stock Exchange Tower | 300 5 Ave SW 51°02′56″N 114°04′06″W | 124 (407) | 31 | 1979 | Office | |
| 43 | Hewlett Packard Tower | Hewlett Packard Tower | 715 5 Ave SW 51°02′55″N 114°04′38″W | 124 (407) | 33 | 1975 | Office | Also known simply as 715 Fifth. |
| 44 | 707 Fifth | 707 Fifth Avenue (Manulife Place) | 707 5 Ave SW 51°02′48″N 114°04′29″W | 124 (407) | 27 | 2017 | Office | |
| 45 | Five West East Tower | Five West East Tower | 910 5th Avenue SW 51°02′57″N 114°04′54″W | 123.4 (405) | 28 | 2008 | Residential | |
| 46 | Three Bow Valley Square | – | 255 5 Avenue SW 51°02′54″N 114°04′01″W | 122.9 (403) | 32 | 1979 | Office | |
| 47 | The Oliver West | – | 538 10 Avenue SW 51°02′38″N 114°04′24″W | 121.3 (398) | 35 | 2024 | Residential | |
| 48 | Nuera | – | 211 13 Avenue SE 51°02′24″N 114°03′36″W | 120.4 (395) | 34 | 2010 | Residential | |
| 49 | Versus West Tower | – | 1008 9 Street SW 51°02′37″N 114°05′01″W | 118.6 (389) | 34 | 2016 | Residential | |
| 50 | UPTEN | – | 201 10 Avenue SE 51°02′35″N 114°03′37″W | 118.3 (388) | 37 | 2020 | Residential | |
| 51 | SODO | – | 620 10 Avenue SW 51°02′39″N 114°04′32″W | 118.3 (388) | 36 | 2019 | Residential | |
| 52 | District | – | 825 8 Avenue SW 51°02′45″N 114°04′49″W | 117.7 (386) | 40 | 1974 | Residential | |
| 53 | Centennial Place II | – | 250 5 Street SW 51°03′04″N 114°04′23″W | 117.6 (386) | 23 | 2010 | Office | |
| 54 | BLVD Beltline North | – | 1221 Macleod Trail SE 51°02′28″N 114°03′33″W | 116.8 (383) | 36 | 2021 | Residential | |
| 55 | The Ampersand East | – | 112 4 Avenue SW 51°02′59″N 114°03′50″W | 116.8 (383) | 28 | 1984 | Residential | |
| 56 | Vetro at Sasso | – | 210 15 Avenue SE 51°02′19″N 114°03′37″W | 115.9 (380) | 34 | 2008 | Residential | |
| 57 | AMEC Place | – | 801 6 Avenue SW 51°02′52″N 114°04′46″W | 115.5 (379) | 28 | 1982 | Office | |
| 58 | The Royal at Mount Royal Village | – | 930 16 Avenue SW 51°02′19″N 114°05′01″W | 115 (377) | 33 | 2019 | Residential | |
| 59 | Residence Inn by Marriott Beltline | – | 610 10 Avenue SW 51°02′38″N 114°04′28″W | 114.6 (376) | 34 | 2019 | Hotel | |
| 60 | Mark on Tenth | – | 901 10 Avenue SW 51°02′37″N 114°05′01″W | 114.3 (375) | 35 | 2016 | Residential | |
| 61 | First Tower | – | 411 1 Street SE 51°02′56″N 114°03′39″W | 113.7 (373) | 27 | 1980 | Office | |
| 62 | Millennium Tower | – | 440 2 Avenue SW 51°03′08″N 114°04′16″W | 113.4 (372) | 23 | 2000 | Office | Formerly known as Ernst and Young Tower. |
| 63 | The Ampersand North | – | 140 4 Avenue SW 51°03′00″N 114°03′52″W | 113.1 (371) | 28 | 1982 | Office | |
| 64 | The Ampersand West | – | 144 4 Avenue SW 51°02′59″N 114°03′53″W | 113.1 (371) | 28 | 1982 | Office | |
| 65 | One Calgary Place | – | 330 5 Avenue SW 51°02′56″N 114°04′09″W | 112.5 (369) | 30 | 1968 | Office | |
| 66 | Alura at Nuera | – | 1320 1 Street SE 51°02′23″N 114°03′38″W | 110.4 (362) | 29 | 2014 | Residential | |
| 67 | Encor Place | – | 645 7 Avenue SW 51°02′48″N 114°04′33″W | 109.8 (360) | 28 | 1988 | Office | |
| 68 | Park Point South | – | 310 12 Avenue SW 51°02′31″N 114°04′08″W | 109.5 (359) | 34 | 2018 | Residential | |
| 69 | The Oliver East | – | 524 10 Avenue SW 51°02′38″N 114°04′20″W | 109.1 (358) | 31 | 2022 | Residential | |
| 70 | WaterMark Tower | – | 530 8 Avenue SW 51°02′47″N 114°04′23″W | 108.8 (357) | 27 | 1983 | Office | |
| 71 | Palliser One | – | 125 9 Avenue SE 51°02′39″N 114°03′41″W | 108.5 (356) | 27 | 2021 | Office | |
| 72 | 6 and Tenth | – | 1010 6 Street SW 51°02′36″N 114°04′34″W | 107.6 (353) | 31 | 2017 | Residential | |
| 73 | One Park Central | – | 510 12 Avenue SW 51°02′31″N 114°04′21″W | 107.6 (353) | 32 | 2020 | Residential | |
| 74 | BLVD Beltline South | – | 1235 Macleod Trail SE 51°02′26″N 114°03′32″W | 107.3 (352) | 32 | 2021 | Residential | |
| 75 | Calgary Place Apartments East | – | 609 8 Street SW 51°02′52″N 114°04′53″W | 104 (341) | 36 | 1970 | Residential | |
| 76 | Calgary Place Apartments West | – | 608 9 Street SW 51°02′52″N 114°05′00″W | 104 (341) | 36 | 1970 | Residential | |
| 77 | Pulse at Evolution | – | 510 6 Avenue SE 51°02′51″N 114°03′07″W | 102.4 (336) | 34 | 2016 | Residential | |
| 78 | 635 8 Avenue | – | 635 8 Avenue SW 51°02′45″N 114°04′33″W | 102.4 (336) | 25 | 1983 | Office | |
| 79 | Ovation at Westgate Park | – | 99 Spruce Place SW 51°02′34″N 114°08′09″W | 101.5 (333) | 31 | 2010 | Residential | |
| 80 | Five West Tower I | – | 920 5 Avenue SW 51°02′57″N 114°04′56″W | 101.5 (333) | 26 | 2006 | Residential | |
| 81 | Mount Royal House | – | 140 10 Avenue SW 51°02′37″N 114°03′54″W | 101 (331) | 34 | 1969 | Residential | |
| 82 | The Montana | – | 817 15 Avenue SW 51°02′20″N 114°04′49″W | 100.5 (330) | 28 | 2009 | Residential | |
| 83 | Eau Claire Tower | – | 600 3 Avenue SW 51°03′04″N 114°04′28″W | 100.3 (329) | 24 | 2016 | Office | |

== Tallest under construction or proposed ==
=== Under construction ===
The following table ranks skyscrapers that are under construction in Calgary that are expected to be at least 100 m (328 ft) tall as of 2026, based on standard height measurement. The “Year” column indicates the expected year of completion. Buildings that are on hold are not included. A dash "–" indicates information about the building's height is currently unknown.

| Building | Height | Floors | Purpose | Year | Notes |
|---|---|---|---|---|---|
| Lincoln | 120 m (394 ft) | 37 | Residential | 2027 | |
| Kings by LaCaille | 113 m (371 ft) | 35 | Residential | 2027 | |

=== Proposed ===
The following table ranks proposed and approved skyscrapers in Calgary that are expected to be at least 100 m (328 ft) tall as of 2026, based on standard height measurement. A dash "–" indicates information about the building's height is currently unknown.

| Building | Height | Floors | Purpose | Status | Notes |
|---|---|---|---|---|---|
| W Calgary Tower | 277.3 m (910 ft) | 71 | Mixed-use | Proposed | |
| JW Marriott Calgary | 246 m (807 ft) | 63 | Mixed-use | Proposed | |
| Plaza 54 | 187 m (614 ft) | 54 | Residential | Proposed | |
| Elbow River I | 178 m (584 ft) | 56 | Residential | Approved | |
| 633 Third | 167 m (548 ft) | 46 | Mixed-use | Proposed | |
| Elbow River II | 162 m (531 ft) | 50 | Residential | Approved | |
| Elbow River III | 146 m (479 ft) | 40 | Residential | Approved | |
| 101 - 11 Avenue SE | 120 m (394 ft) | 37 | Residential | Approved | |
| Brentwood Common | 120 m (394 ft) | 40 | Residential | Approved | |
| Curtis Block III | 119 m (390 ft) | 36 | Residential | Approved | |
| Beltline Block Tower | 118 m (387 ft) | 36 | Residential | Approved | |
| 526 4th Ave | 112 m (367 ft) | 32 | Residential | Proposed | |
| West Village Towers III | 100 m (328 ft) | – | Residential | Approved | |

== Timeline of tallest buildings ==
This lists buildings that once held the title of tallest building in Calgary. Although it is not a building, the Calgary Tower was the city's tallest free standing structure from 1968 until 1983 when it was surpassed by the Suncor Energy Centre's West tower.

| Name | Image | Years as tallest | Height m / ft | Floors |
|---|---|---|---|---|
| Fairmont Palliser Hotel | Fairmont Palliser Hotel | 1914–1958 | 60 / 197 | 12 |
| Elveden House | Elveden House | 1960–1968 | 80 / 262 | 20 |
| One Calgary Place | One Calgary Place | 1968–1973 | 110 / 361 | 30 |
| Altius Centre | Altius Centre | 1973–1975 | 126 / 413 | 32 |
| Bow Valley Square 2 | Bow Valley Square | 1975–1976 | 143 / 469 | 39 |
| Stephen Avenue Place | Scotia Centre | 1976–1982 | 155 / 509 | 41 |
| First Canadian Centre | First Canadian Centre | 1982–1984 | 167 / 548 | 41 |
| Suncor Energy Centre - West | Suncor Energy Centre | 1984–2011 | 215 / 705 | 53 |
| The Bow | The Bow | 2011–2017 | 236 / 774 | 58 |
| Brookfield Place East | Brookfield Place East | 2017–present | 247 / 810 | 56 |

== See also ==
- List of attractions and landmarks in Calgary
- List of tallest buildings in Alberta
- List of tallest buildings in Canada
- List of tallest buildings in Edmonton
- Architecture of Canada
