= Bow Valley Square =

Building Complex in Calgary, Alberta

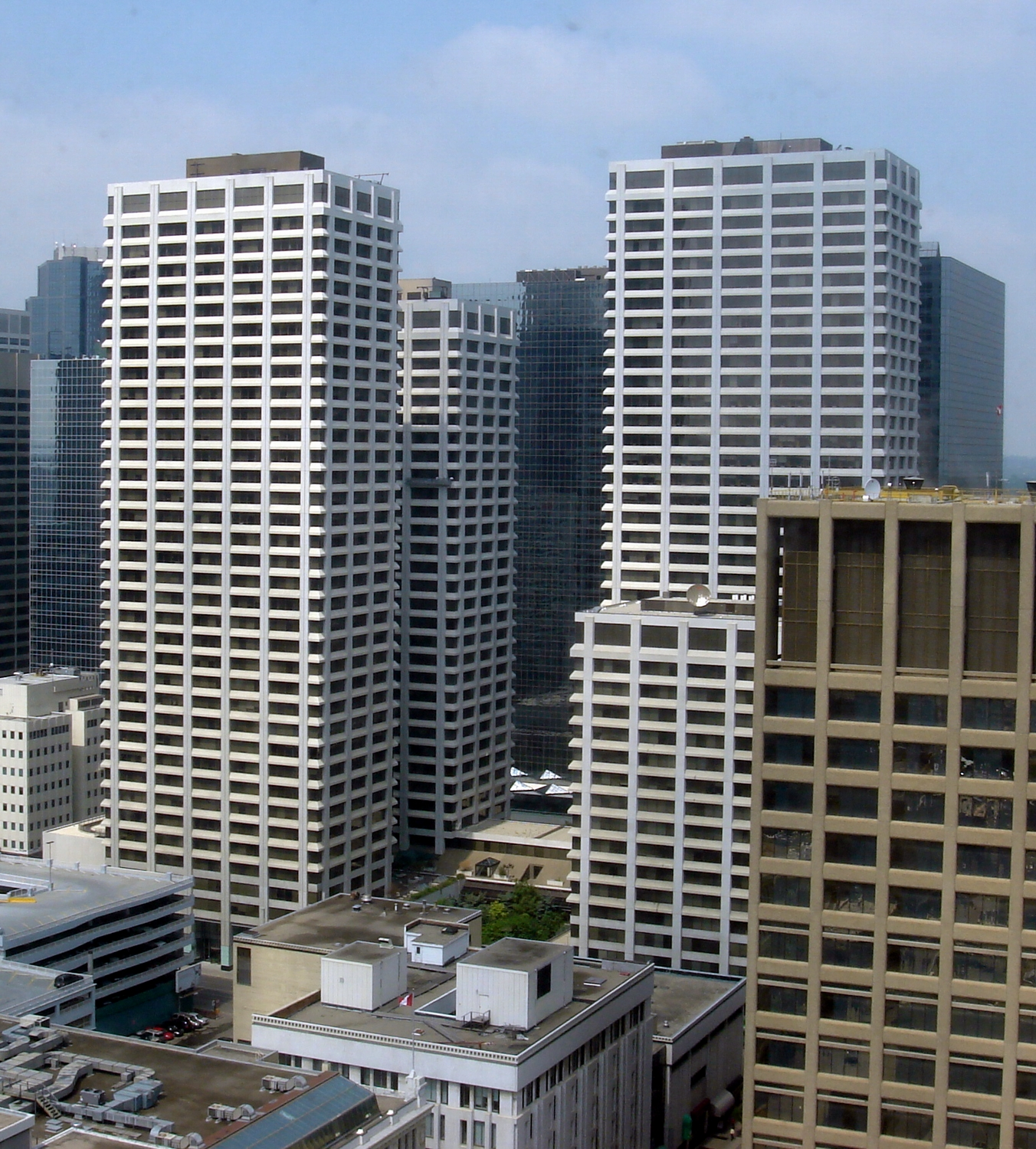
- Bow Valley Square
- Interactive map of the Bow Valley Square area

General information
- Location: Calgary, Alberta, Canada
- Coordinates: 51°02′53″N 114°03′59″W
- Construction started: 1972 (Tower 1)
- Topped-out: February 1974 (Tower 2); June 1981 (Tower 4)
- Completed: 1982 (Tower 4)
- Owner: AIMCo (50%) OMERS/ Oxford Properties (50%)
- Management: Oxford Properties

Height
- Roof: 143 m (469 ft) (Tower 2)

Technical details
- Floor count: 39 (Tower 2)

Design and construction
- Architect: WZMH Architects
- Developer: Hammerson Canada
- Main contractor: CANA Construction Company Limited

Bow Valley Square is a four-tower office tower complex in downtown Calgary, Alberta, Canada. The complex constructed in stages between 1972 and 1982 was home to Calgary's tallest building between 1974 and 1976. The complex is owned by Alberta Investment Management Corporation, OMERS and Oxford Properties Group.

== History ==
The complex was developed by Toronto based Hammerson Canada and consists of four towers built over a period of 12 years, starting with the 17-storey first tower, 39-storey second tower, 33-storey third tower and finally 38-storey fourth tower which was topped off in June 1981. The buildings were designed by Webb, Zerafa, Menkes & Housden Architects and built by CANA Construction Company Limited. In 1985 Hammerson began evaluating construction of a fifth tower which would have been 17 storeys with 9,300 square metres (100,000 ft^{2}) of leaseable space; however, the fifth tower never come to fruition. Boris Zerafa of WZMH Architects received the 1970 Canadian Architect Yearbook Award of Excellence for the design of the Bow Valley Square complex. The design incorporates aspects of the International Style and is noted as one of the more elegant designs in the city for the period analogized as "Cadillac and Porsche architecture" versus the more common "sturdy Buicks and Oldsmobiles of middle management" design prevalent in Alberta during the period.

Located in downtown Calgary, the buildings are directly connected by the +15 skywalk system to Fifth Avenue Place to the north, Suncor Energy Centre to the east, and Brookfield Place to the south. A shopping gallery is at the +15 level as well as ground level and contains retail, recreation, services and financial services. Construction started in 1972 and ended in 1981 with the fourth tower. The towers' addresses are 205 5 Avenue SW, 255 5 Avenue SW, 202 6 Avenue SW, and 250 6 Avenue SW.

== Towers ==
The complex's tallest tower is Bow Valley Square 2, a 39-storey 143 m (469 ft) building topped off in February 1974. It was the tallest building in western Canada when it was built in 1975 and remained the tallest until 1977 when Scotia Centre was completed in 1977.

Tower	Floors	Height	Built	Direction
1	17		1972	SE
2	39	143 m (469 ft)	1975	NE
3	32	116 m (381 ft)	1979	NW
4	37	134 m (440 ft)	1981	SW

== See also ==
- List of tallest buildings in Calgary

Preceded by Altius Centre	Tallest building in Calgary; 1974-1976; Bow Valley Square 2 - 143 m	Succeeded by Scotia Centre
