= First Canadian Centre =

Office tower in Calgary, Alberta, Canada

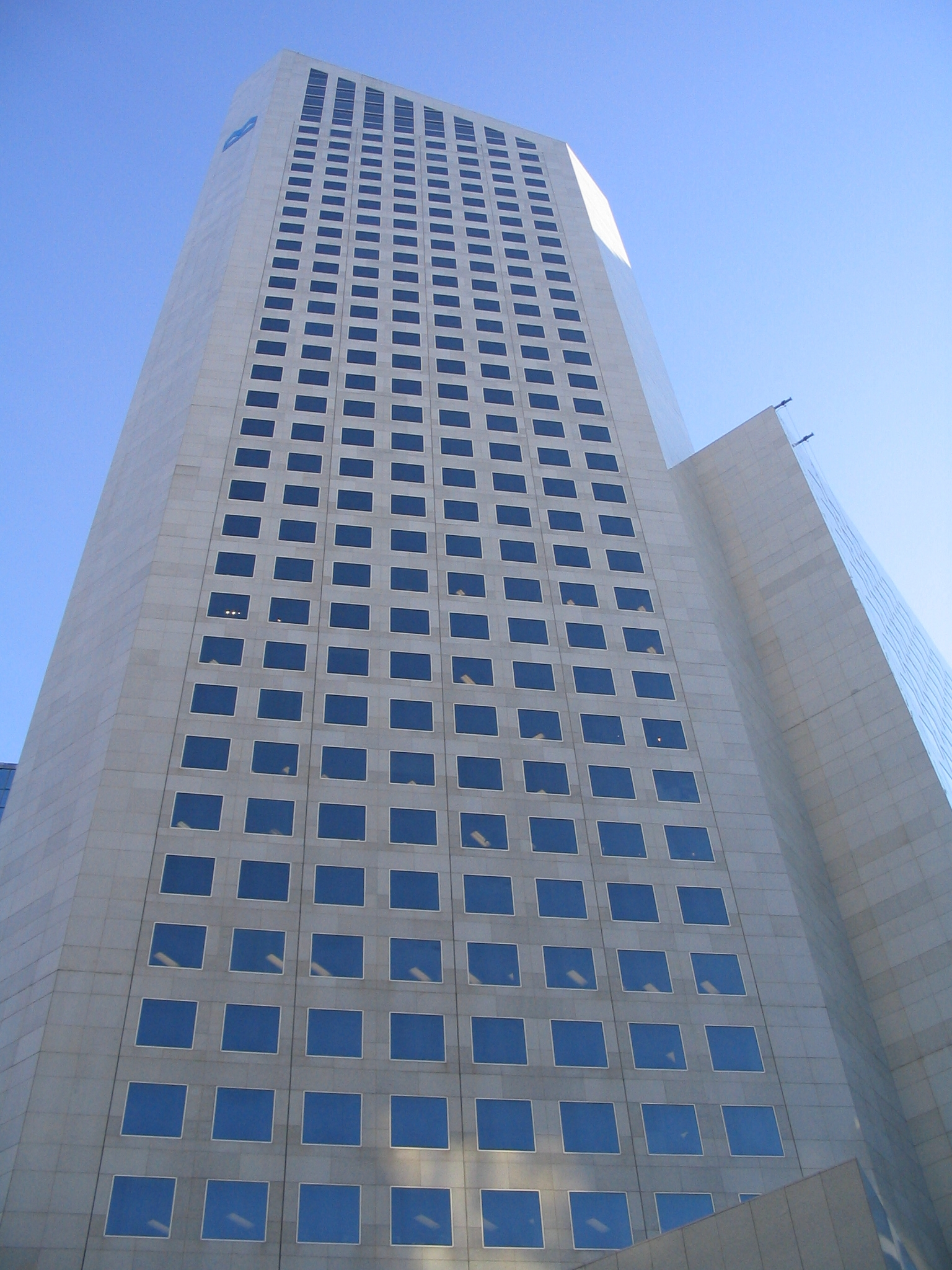
- Interactive map of the First Canadian Centre area

General information
- Status: Completed
- Type: Office
- Location: 350 7 Avenue SW; Calgary, Alberta; T2P 3N9
- Coordinates: 51°02′49″N 114°04′12″W
- Completed: 1982

Height
- Roof: 166.7 m (547 ft)

Technical details
- Floor count: 41
- Floor area: 48,275 m^{2} (519,630 sq ft)

Design and construction
- Architect: Skidmore, Owings & Merrill
- Main contractor: PCL Construction Management Inc.

First Canadian Centre is an office tower in Calgary, Alberta designed by Donald C. Smith (1929–2014) of the New York firm Skidmore, Owings & Merrill. It was the second SOM project in Calgary after Toronto-Dominion Square, which is on the neighbouring block to the south. The project was intended to include 41-storey and 64-storey towers connected by a banking hall. However, due to the early 1980s recession, the taller tower was never completed.

Located at 350 7 Avenue SW in the city's downtown core, it stands at 167 metres (548 ft) or 41 storeys tall. The skyscraper has a floor area of 48,275 m^{2} (519,630 sq ft) and was built in the international and late modernist architectural styles.

The Bank of Montreal occupies most of the ground floor with a large retail bank branch.

== History ==
Original plans called for a two tower complex, with this tower being the first of the two tower project. The second tower would have had 64 storeys. A downturn in the local economy at that time forced plans for the second tower to be shelved. The second tower, at the corner of Seventh Avenue SW and Second Street SW, with a proposed opposite top slope to the first tower, to be 64 stories, was started in 1981, with the pouring of its foundation at street level from both 7th Avenue and 2nd Street. All traffic was stopped by police during the night to allow concrete trucks to reign non-stop along Seventh Avenue. Ten thousand cubic metres of concrete was placed in 26 hours, making it the largest continuous concrete pour in North America at the time. Concrete was supplied from two ready mix plants, approximately eight concrete pump trucks were strategically located along the east and north sides of the construction site. Twenty 1-metre dia. half pipes placed along Seventh Avenue which were used to place the greatest volume of concrete from street level to the foundation 3 stories below. The large foundation and parking levels still remain covered by a park at street level with the hope for the tower to be constructed in the future. Dome Petroleum was slated to move into the second tower using a large portion of it for its Calgary based operation, nicknaming it "The Dome Tower" prior to its construction. With the National Energy Program slowing Alberta's oil and gas industry in the early 1980s, Dome's profits were hit hard and caused the company to withdraw from the tower's acquisition, which may have had a large effect for the tower's demise.

During the construction of the West Tower, it was rumored that the future East Tower had an "open-ended" design plan that could potentially add extra floors to the top of the tower in order to attain title of the tallest building in Calgary, as the Petro-Canada Tower at Fifth Ave and Centre Street was then under construction and its total height was to end up being the tallest building in Calgary.

The existing West Tower is clad entirely with white-grey marble slabs imported from a quarry in Italy; the second tower was to be clad identically.

== Gallery ==
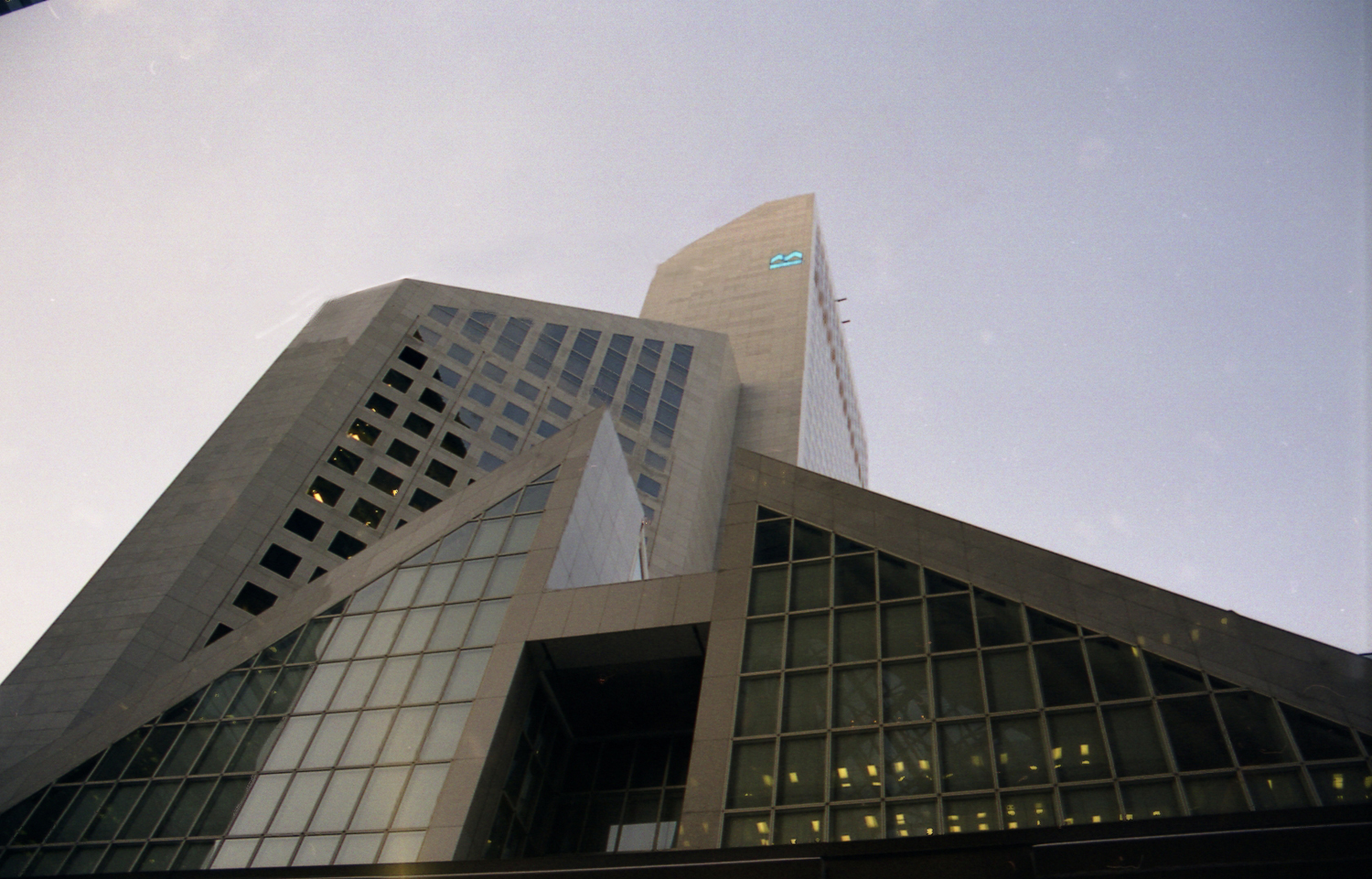
Street view

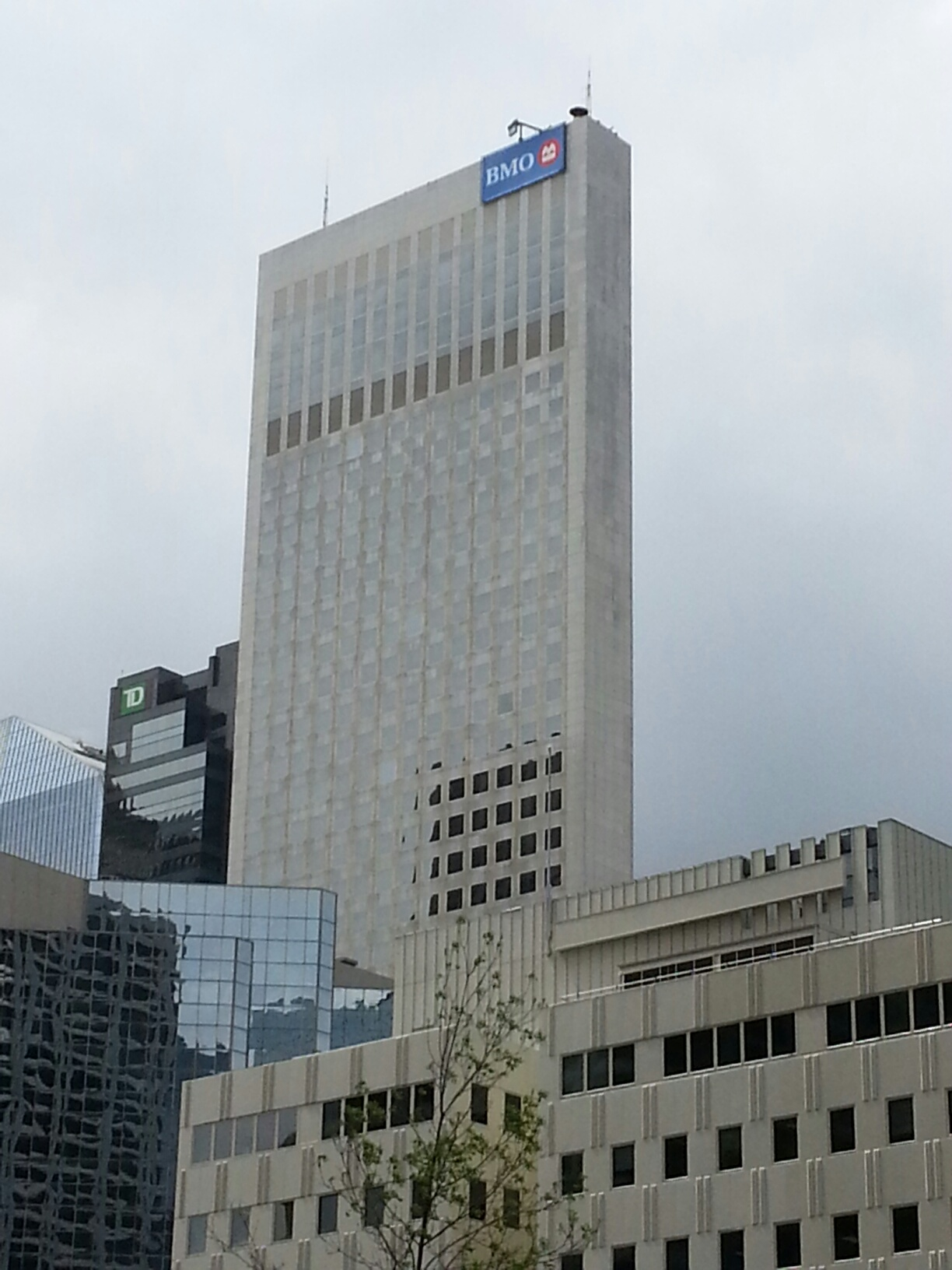
From the North East

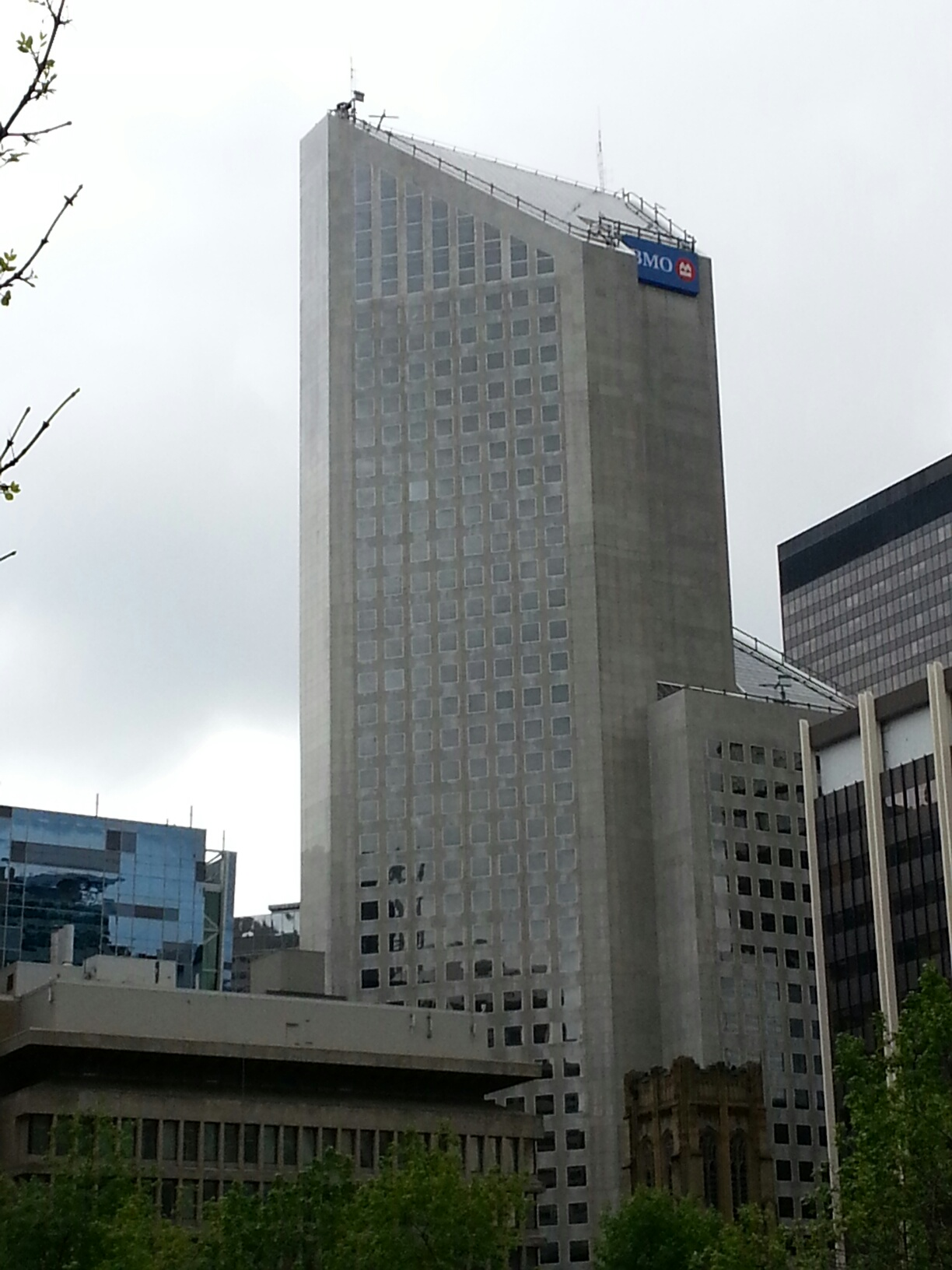
From the North West

== See also ==
- List of tallest buildings in Calgary
