= Calgary Courts Centre =

Court facility in Alberta, Canada

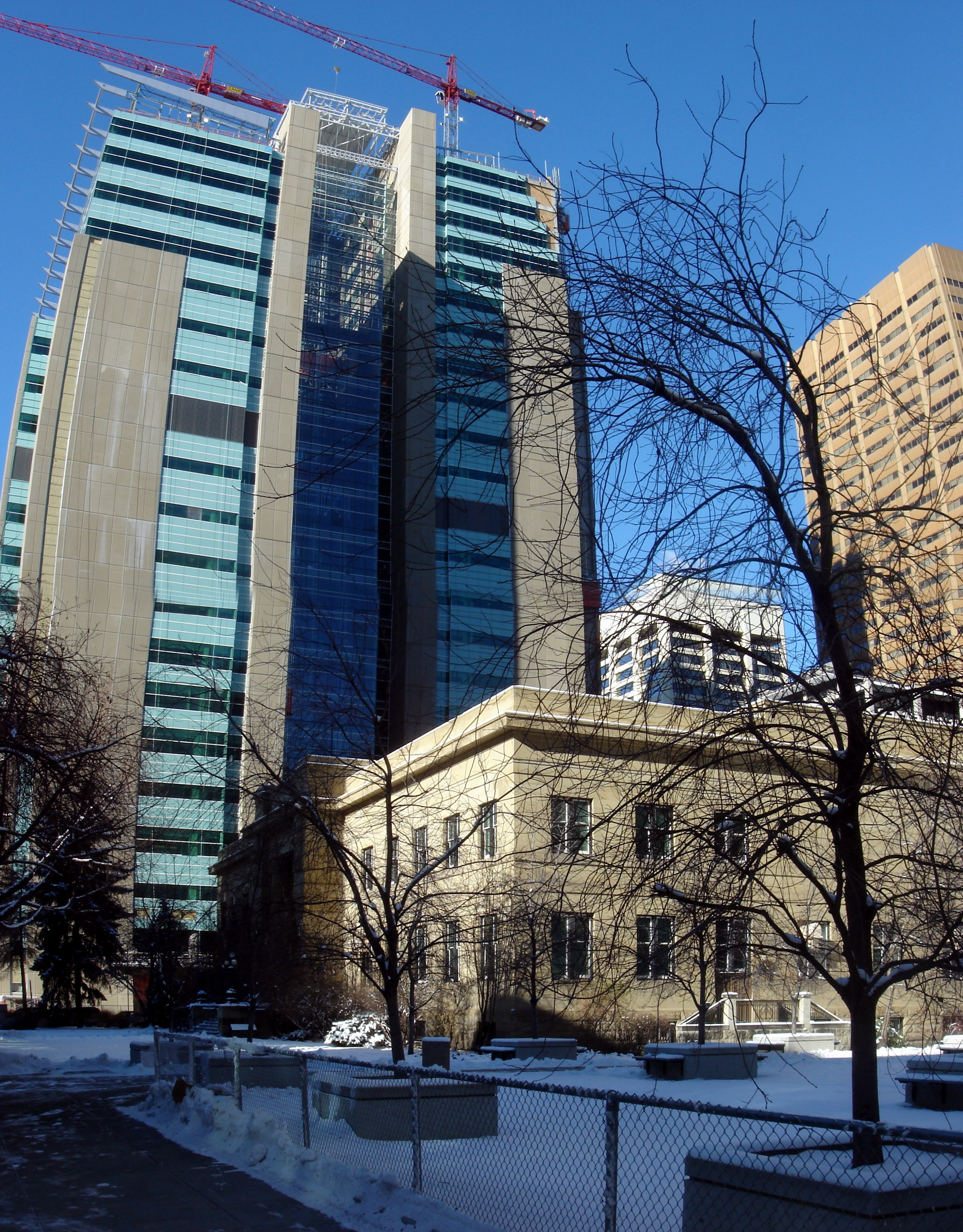
- Calgary Courts Centre under construction in October 2006
- Interactive map of the Calgary Courts Centre area

General information
- Type: Institutional
- Location: Calgary, Alberta, Canada
- Coordinates: 51°02′50.0″N 114°04′25.7″W
- Construction started: 2004
- Completed: 2007
- Cost: $300 million
- Owner: Government of Alberta

Height
- Roof: 129 m (423 ft)

Technical details
- Floor count: 24
- Floor area: 90,000 m^{2} (970,000 sq ft)

Design and construction
- Architect: Kasian Architecture / Carlos Ott
- Main contractor: Cana

Calgary Courts Centre is the largest court facility in North America by size (square footage), and is in Calgary, Alberta. It was constructed by the Government of Alberta and provides over 93,000 m^{2} (1 million square feet) of court and office space.

== History ==
Construction began in late 2004, and is now complete. Development of the east block began in the fall of 2007. It included a 700-stall underground parkade, an urban park, and the demolition of the Court of Queen's Bench facility.

The prime consultant for the building was Kasian Architecture and Interior Design Ltd working collaboratively with design architect Carlos Ott and is built by the Cana construction company with the security system being installed by Convergint Technologies. The structural engineering was provided by Stantec. The north tower's 24 floors stand 129 m (423 ft) high. The project had a budget of $300 million and hosts 73 courtrooms, judicial chambers, and facilities for 180 security personnel and approximately 360 government, library and external agencies staff.

== See also ==
- List of tallest buildings in Calgary
