= Jamieson Place (Calgary) =

Skyscraper in Alberta, Canada

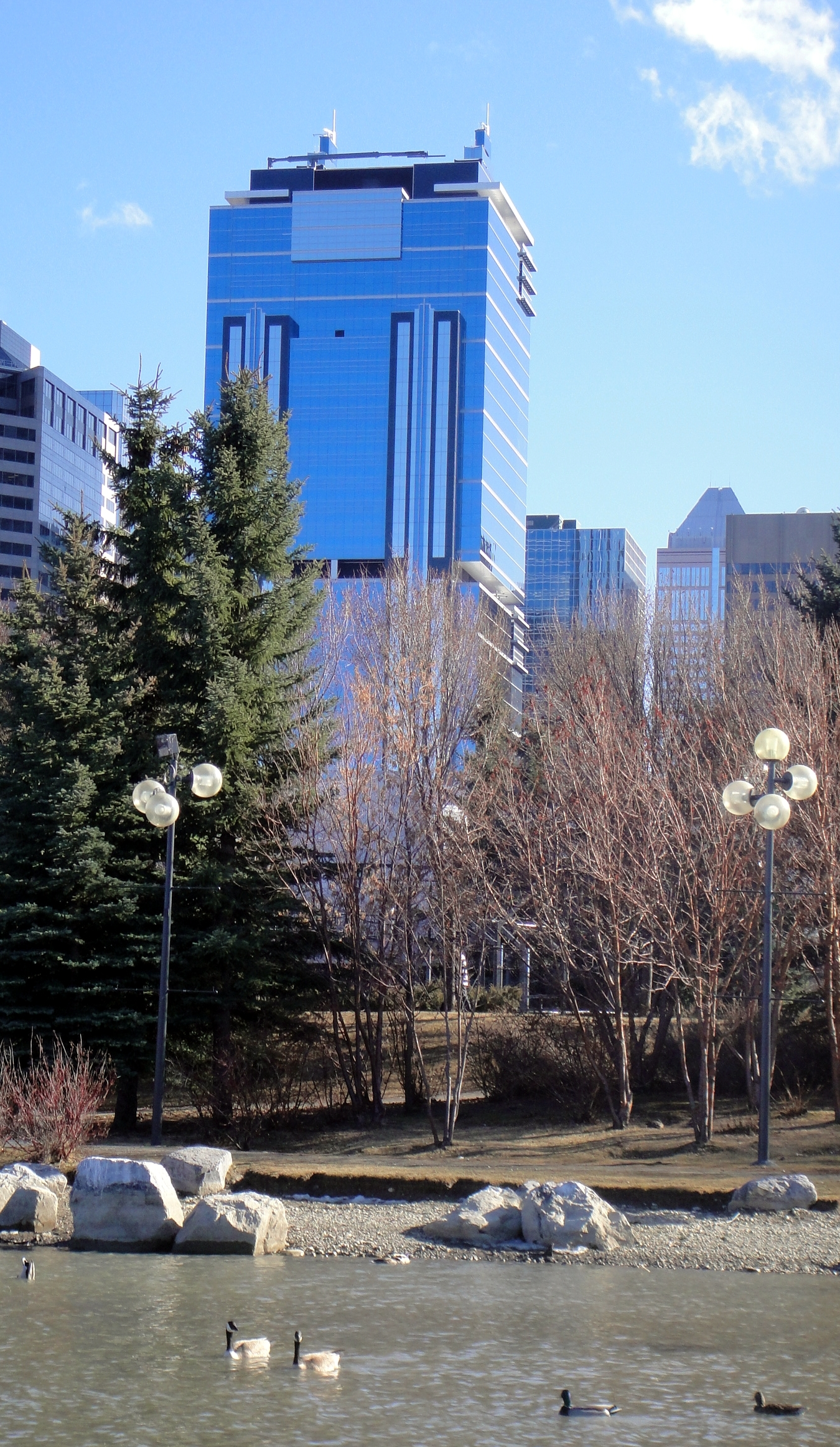
- Jamieson Place seen from Princes Island Park
- Interactive map of the Jamieson Place area

General information
- Status: Completed
- Type: Office
- Location: Calgary, Alberta, Canada
- Coordinates: 51°02′59″N 114°04′06″W
- Construction started: January 2007
- Opening: December 2009
- Cost: $442-million
- Owner: British Columbia Investment Management Corporation
- Operator: Bentall Capital

Height
- Antenna spire: 173 m (568 ft)
- Roof: 170 m (560 ft)

Technical details
- Floor count: 38
- Floor area: 880,000 sq ft (82,000 m^{2})
- Lifts/elevators: 17

Design and construction
- Architect: Gibbs Gage Architects
- Developer: Bentall LP
- Structural engineer: Read Jones Christoffersen
- Main contractor: EllisDon

Jamieson Place is a 880,000-square-foot (82,000 m^{2}) office building in the city's downtown core of Calgary, Alberta, Canada. At the time of its completion in 2009, the 173 m (568 ft) Jamiseson Place was the third tallest office tower in Calgary.

The building's winter garden is home to three hanging glass chandeliers by artist Dale Chihuly.

== History ==
Bentall Capital on behalf of the property owner British Columbia Investment Management Corporation, tasked Gibbs Gage Architects to design a structure at the corner of 2nd Street and 4th Avenue SW. The proposed 38 floor design was inspired by Frank Lloyd Wright and the vernacular landscape of the Canadian Prairies, featuring twin illuminated vertical spires capping the building at 173 m (568 ft). The design included connections to the city's Plus 15 network, and a three-story indoor winter garden. The complex would also include a five level underground parkade with 500 stalls, totaling 240,000 sq ft (22,000 m^{2}).

Groundbreaking for $300-million (equivalent to $442-million in 2025) project occurred in January 2007 and construction completed in December 2009. Following construction Jamieson Place has earned BOMA Platinum status and LEED Gold status.

Jamieson Place was named in honour of Alice Jamieson, a resident of Calgary who in 1914 became the first female appointed to the judiciary in the British Empire.

As of 2020, Skyscraper Center, a project of the Council on Tall Buildings and Urban Habitat lists Jamieson place as the 12th tallest building in Calgary and 64th tallest in Canada.

== Gallery ==
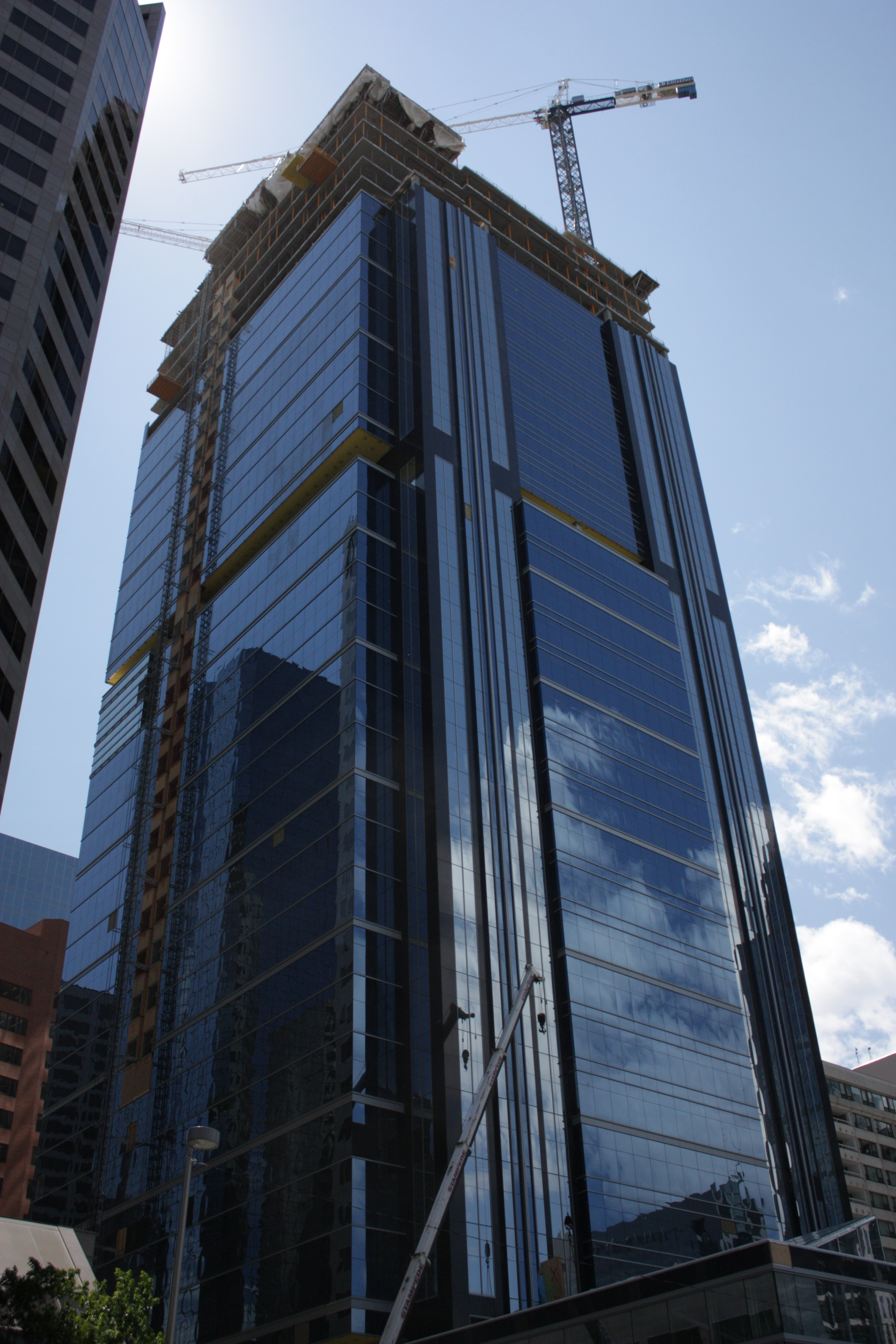
Construction of Jamieson Place in June 2009

== See also ==
- List of tallest buildings in Calgary
- Jamieson Place, a residential neighbourhood in west Edmonton, Alberta.
