= Arriva Tower =

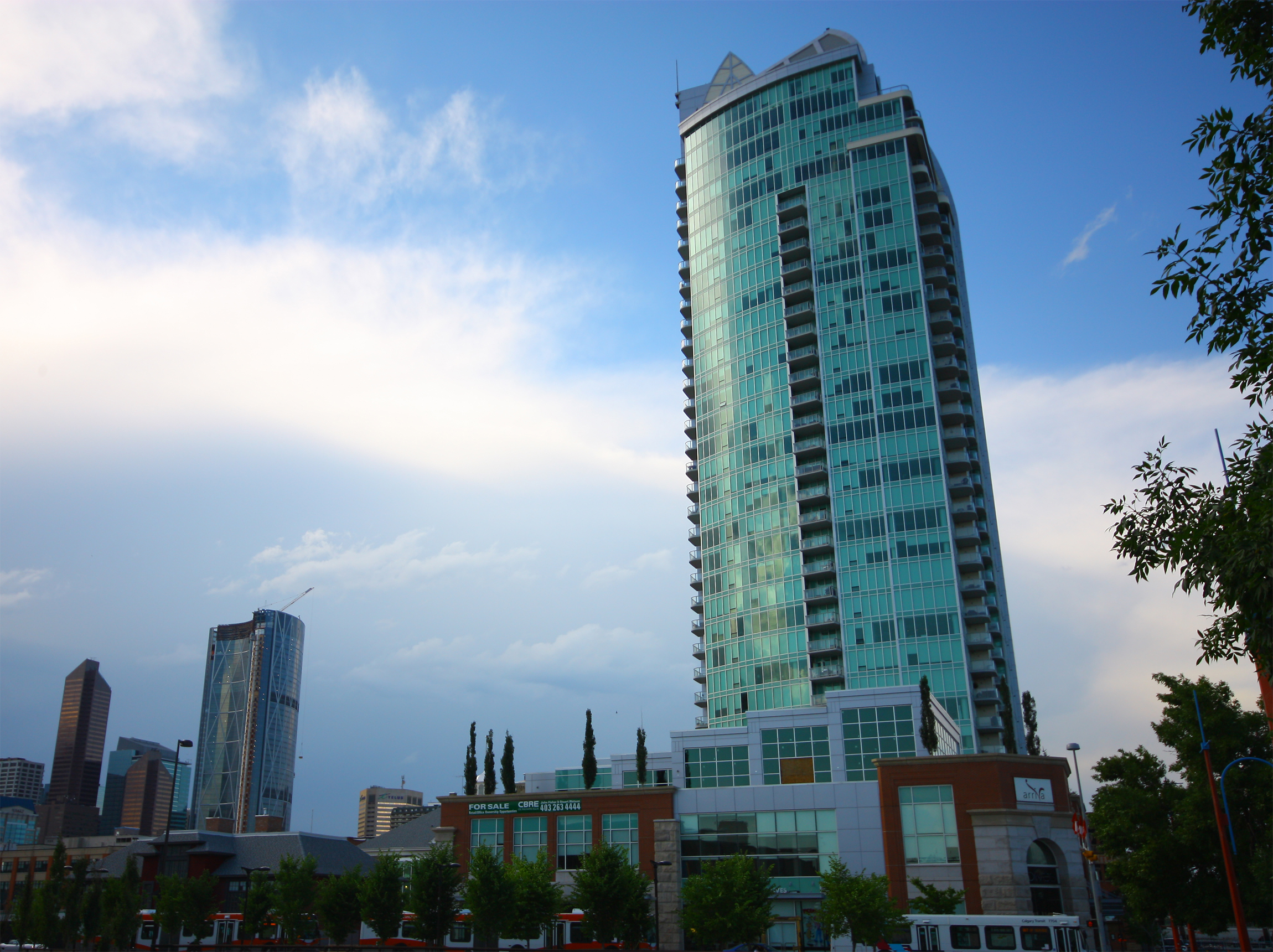
- Arriva Tower 1
- Interactive map of the Arriva Tower area

General information
- Status: Arriva 1: Open; Arriva 2: Cancelled; Arriva 3: Cancelled
- Type: Residential
- Location: 11 Avenue SE, Calgary, Alberta, Canada
- Coordinates: 51°02′30.8″N 114°03′23.1″W
- Construction started: April 26, 2005
- Opening: November 30, 2007

Height
- Roof: 128 m (420 ft)

Technical details
- Floor count: 34

Design and construction
- Architect: BKDI Architects (now Zeidler Architecture)
- Developer: Torode Realty Ltd.

The Arriva Tower is a 128 m (418 ft) 34-storey high-rise condominium in Calgary, Alberta, Canada. Located in Victoria Park, a historic neighbourhood in Calgary's Beltline neighbourhood, north of the Stampede Grounds and Scotiabank Saddledome. The glass and steel skyscraper features brick and sandstone finish at the base, to reflect the architectonic style of the surrounding historic buildings of the Warehouse District.

The Arriva Tower was envisioned as the first phase of the three tower residential complex. The first tower was completed in 2007, while subsequent twin 42-storey towers (Arriva 2 and 3) would have reached a height of 163 m (535 ft) to their spires.

== Towers ==
=== Arriva I ===
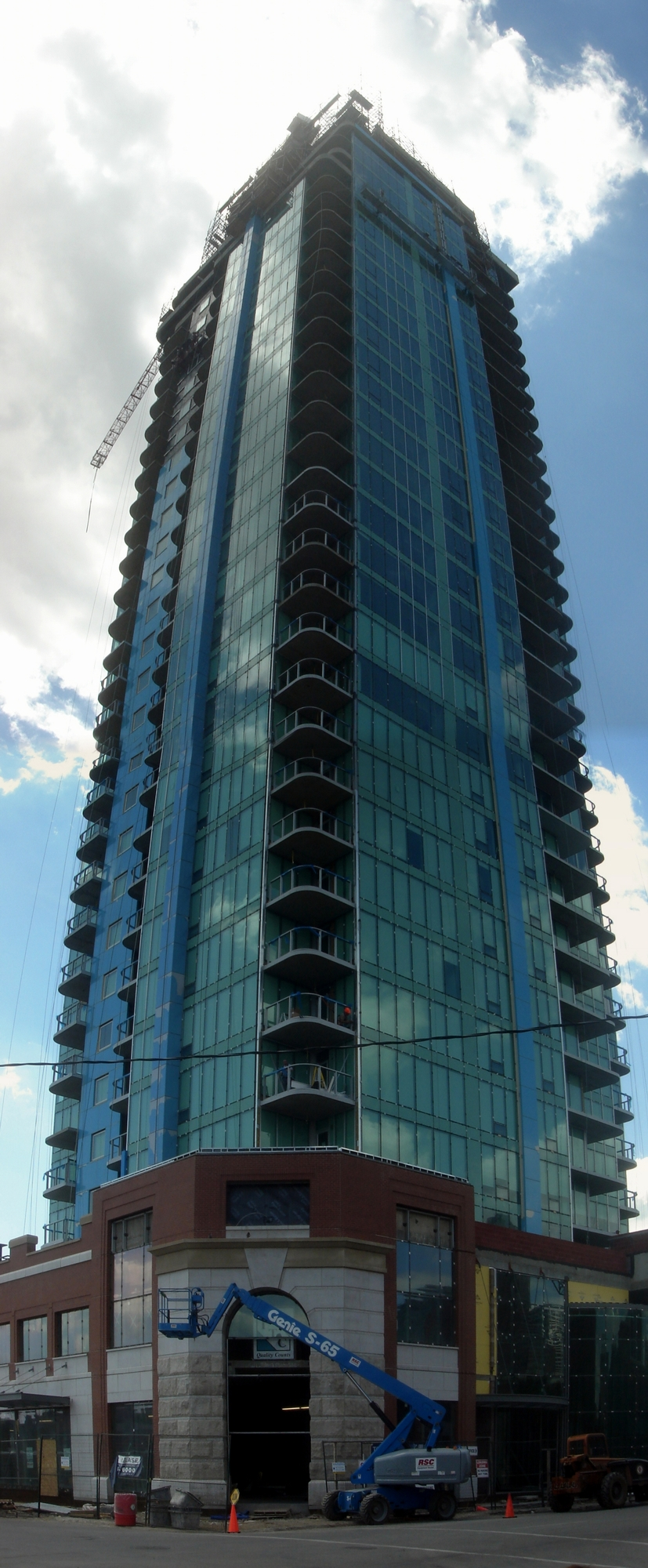
Arriva Tower 1 under construction in July 2007

Groundbreaking took place on April 26, 2005, and the first phase tower has begun occupancy as of November 30, 2007. The base of the buildings contains commercial space, including two restaurants, a dental office (Pinnacle Dental), a medical clinic, and spa, while the surrounding area will consist of public parks, shops and recreation spaces.

The buildings were designed by BKDI Architects (now Zeidler Architecture), and developed by Torode Reality Ltd. TRL also owns the Hotel Arts, Kensington Riverside Inn and many other development projects.

=== Arriva 2 ===
On April 7, 2009, the Calgary Herald reported work has stopped on the second of three planned towers, pending the developer's financial restructuring under bankruptcy protection. The developer, Torode Realty Ltd. was seeking "new investment" to finance construction of the remaining two towers. The site of the second & third towers, dubbed The Guardian, was purchased by new owners and construction was completed in 2015 for one tower and 2017 for the other. Once completed, it was said to be the province's new tallest residential building at 146 metres. According to The Guardian's home page, the twin 44-storey towers are the tallest residential towers in Calgary.

== See also ==
- List of tallest buildings in Calgary
