= Fifth Avenue Place (Calgary) =

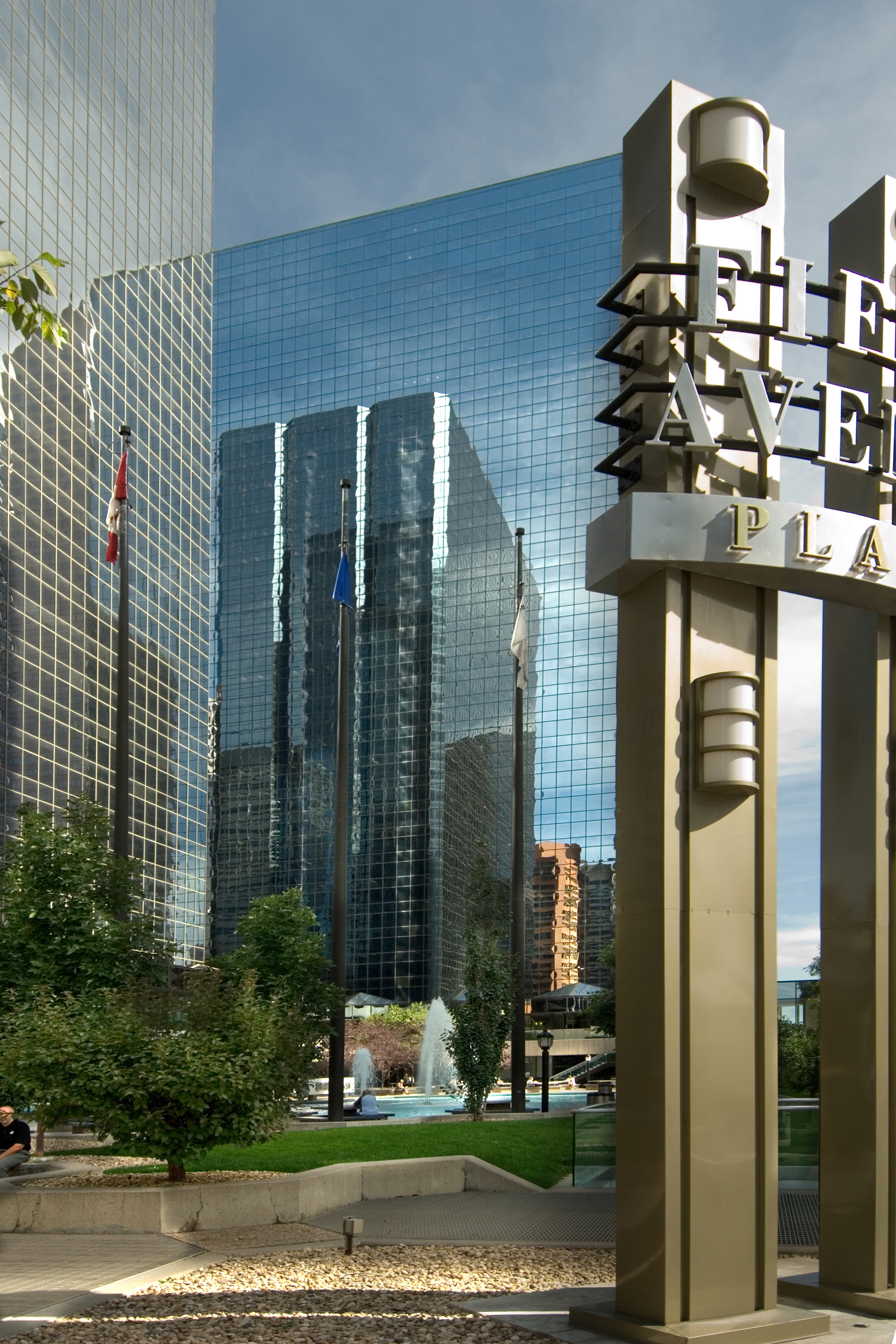
- The East Tower reflecting the West Tower
- Interactive map of the Fifth Avenue Place area

General information
- Type: Office
- Location: 420 2 Street SW; Calgary, Alberta; T2P 3K4
- Coordinates: 51°02′56″N 114°03′58″W
- Construction started: 1979
- Completed: 1981

Height
- Roof: 132.6 m (435 ft)

Technical details
- Floor count: 35

Design and construction
- Developer: Brookfield Properties

Fifth Avenue Place is a high-rise skyscraper complex in Calgary, Alberta, Canada. It was originally called Esso Plaza. It occupies the entire area of a city block, between 4th and 5th Avenue South and 1st and 2nd Street West in Downtown Calgary.

The buildings are managed by Brookfield Properties.

== Towers ==
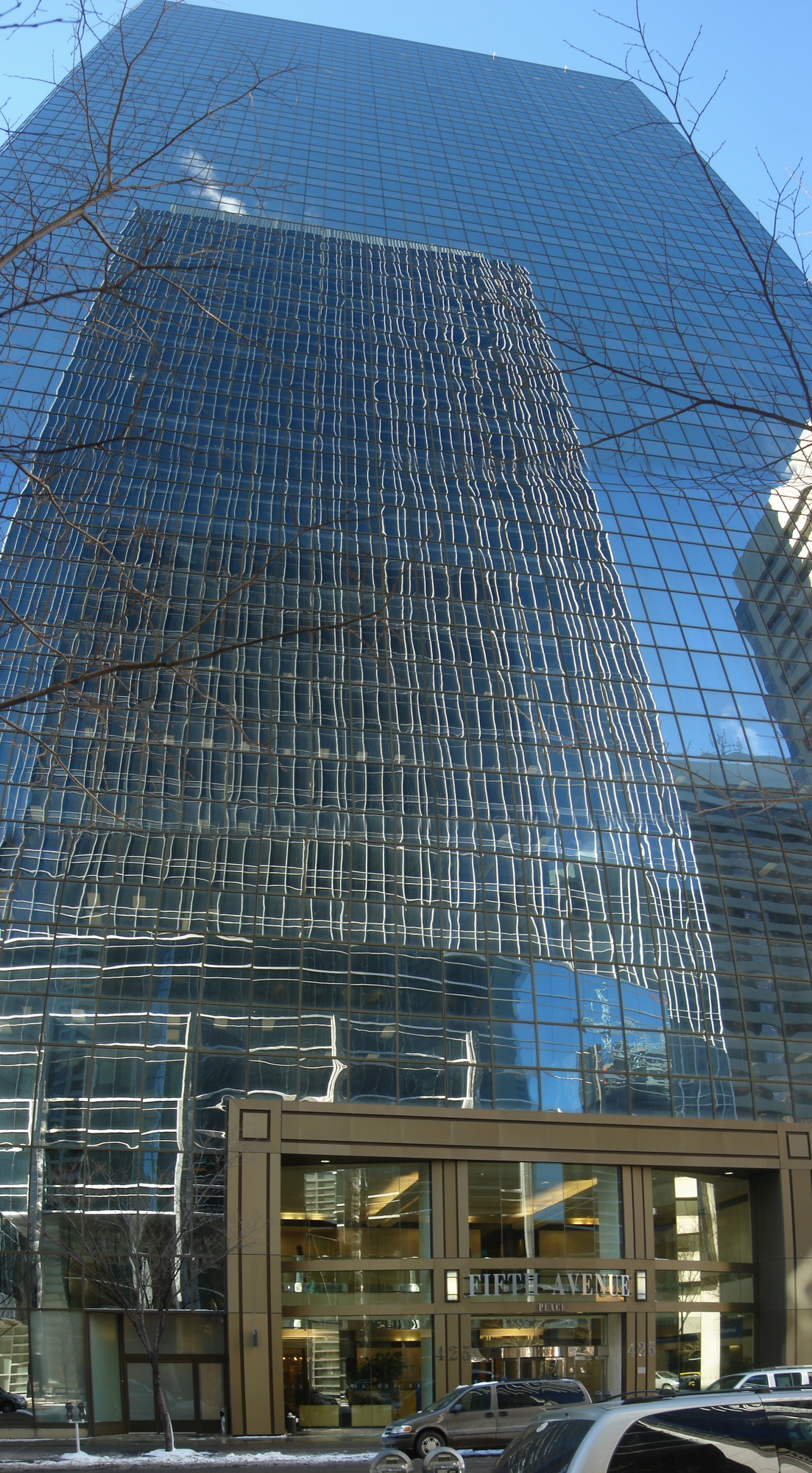
East Tower with reflection of TransCanada Tower

The complex consists of two structures, East Tower and West Tower, both with 35 floors and a height of 133 m (436 ft). Construction started in 1979 and the complex was completed in 1981, at the height of the 1980s oil boom. Although the towers are almost identical, they are arranged in an "L" shape, with the West Tower oriented east–west, and the East Tower places on a north–south direction. Fifth Avenue Place was built in late modernist style and has curtain walls with alternating vision glass on all sides. The three level underground parkade provides 793 parking stalls. The two towers are connected by a two level shopping galleria, which is connected by the Plus 15 skywalk network to nearby structures.

Tower	Address	Floors	Height	Built
West	237 4 Ave SW	35	132.6 m (435 ft)	1981
East	425 1 St SW	35	132.6 m (435 ft)	1981

== See also ==
- List of tallest buildings in Calgary
- Imperial Oil Building, the Imperial Oil Company's former Toronto headquarters
