= Canterra Tower =

Skyscraper in Calgary, Alberta, Canada

400 Third
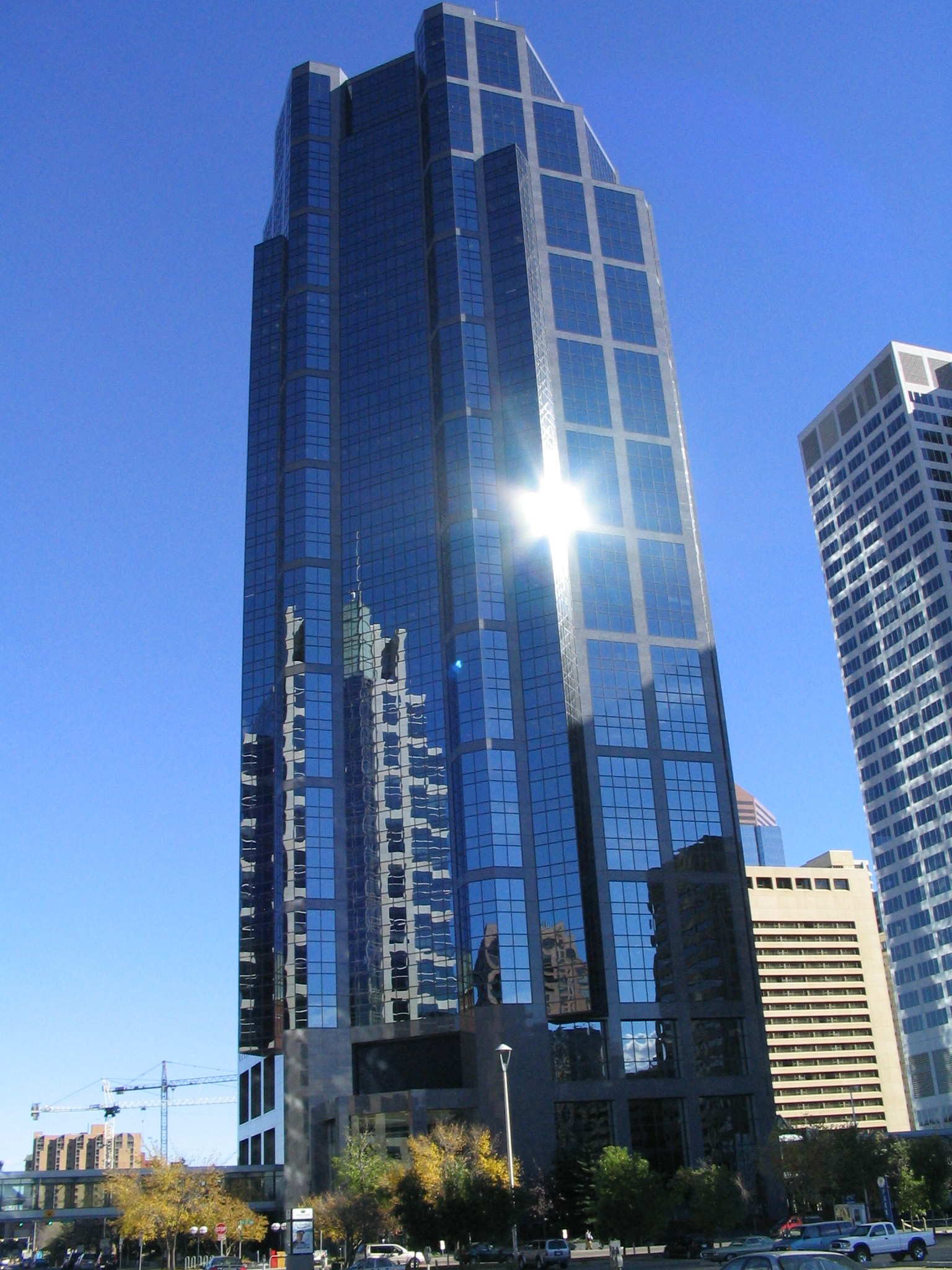
- 400 Third (Formerly Devon Tower, Canterra Tower)
- Interactive map of the 400 Third area

General information
- Status: Completed
- Type: Office
- Location: Calgary, Alberta, Canada
- Coordinates: 51°03′04.1″N 114°04′14.6″W
- Completed: 1988
- Owner: Oxford Properties
- Operator: Oxford Properties

Height
- Roof: 177 m (581 ft)

Technical details
- Floor count: 45

Design and construction
- Architect: WZMH Architects
- Main contractor: PCL Construction

400 Third (formerly known as Devon Tower from 2011 - 2023, and Canterra Tower from opening until 2011) is a skyscraper in Calgary, Alberta, Canada.

Located at 400 3rd Avenue SW, it stands at 177 metres (581 ft) or 45 storeys tall. The building was completed in 1988 and was designed by WZMH Architects in the postmodern style. It was built with glass curtain walls on all sides.

The building is owned and managed by Oxford Properties, and major tenants in the building include law firm Norton Rose Fulbright LLP.
