= TC Energy Tower =

Office building in Calgary, Alberta, Canada

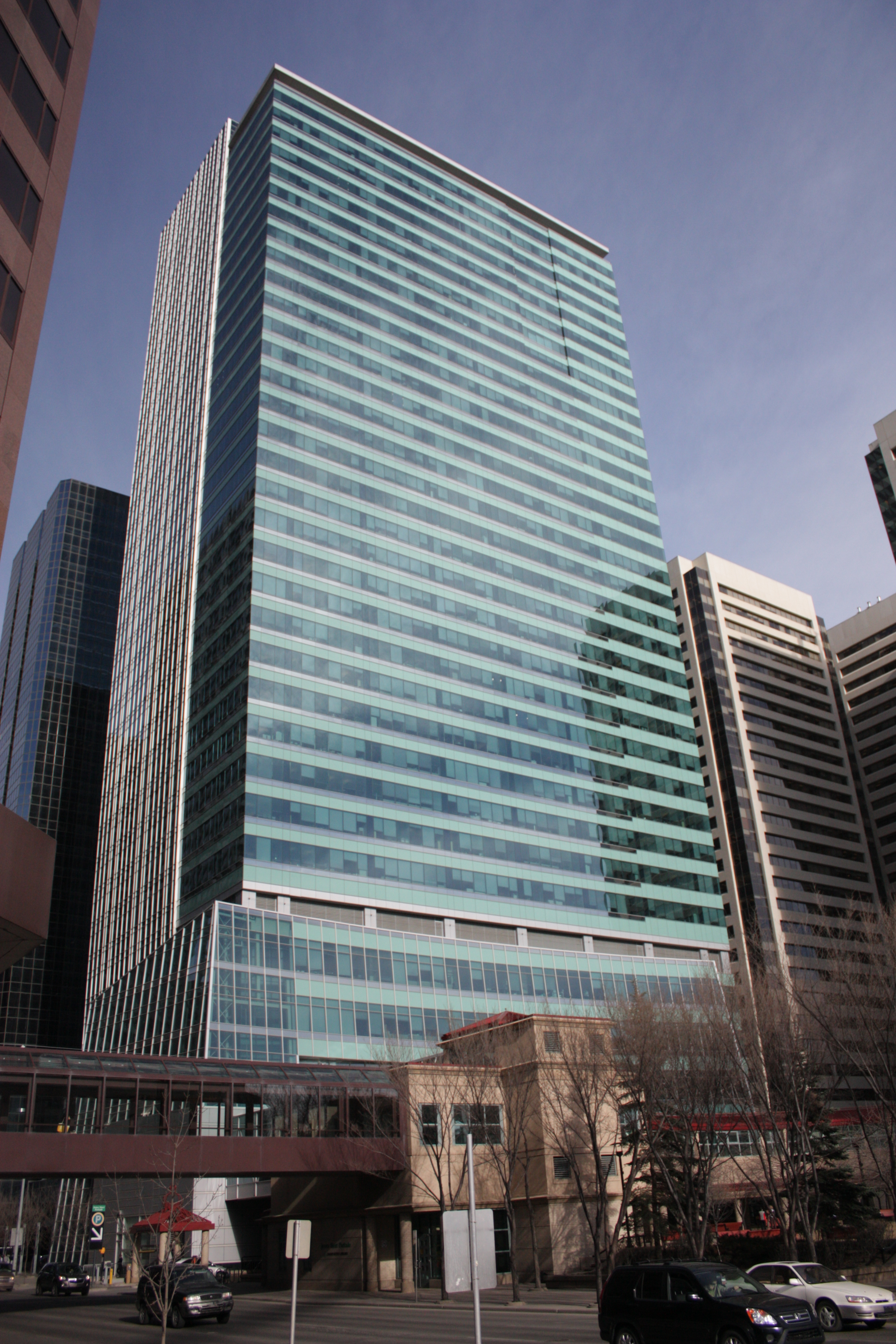
- TransCanada Tower (now TC Energy Tower) in 2009
- Interactive map of the TC Energy Tower area

General information
- Type: Office
- Location: 450 1 Street SW; Calgary, Alberta; T2P 5H1
- Coordinates: 51°02′56.1″N 114°03′53.2″W
- Completed: 2001
- Owner: H&R REIT

Height
- Roof: 177 m (581 ft)

Technical details
- Floor area: 89,514 m^{2} (963,520 sq ft)

Design and construction
- Architect: Cohos Evamy

TC Energy Tower (formerly TransCanada Tower) is a high-rise office building located at 450 1 Street SW in the downtown core of Calgary, Alberta, Canada. It has 38 stories, stands at 177 meters (581 ft) tall, and was completed in 2001. It was designed by the architectural firm Cohos Evamy. The tower overlooks James Short Park.

The TC Energy Tower houses the head offices of TC Energy (formerly TransCanada Corporation).

== See also ==
- List of tallest buildings in Calgary

== Gallery ==
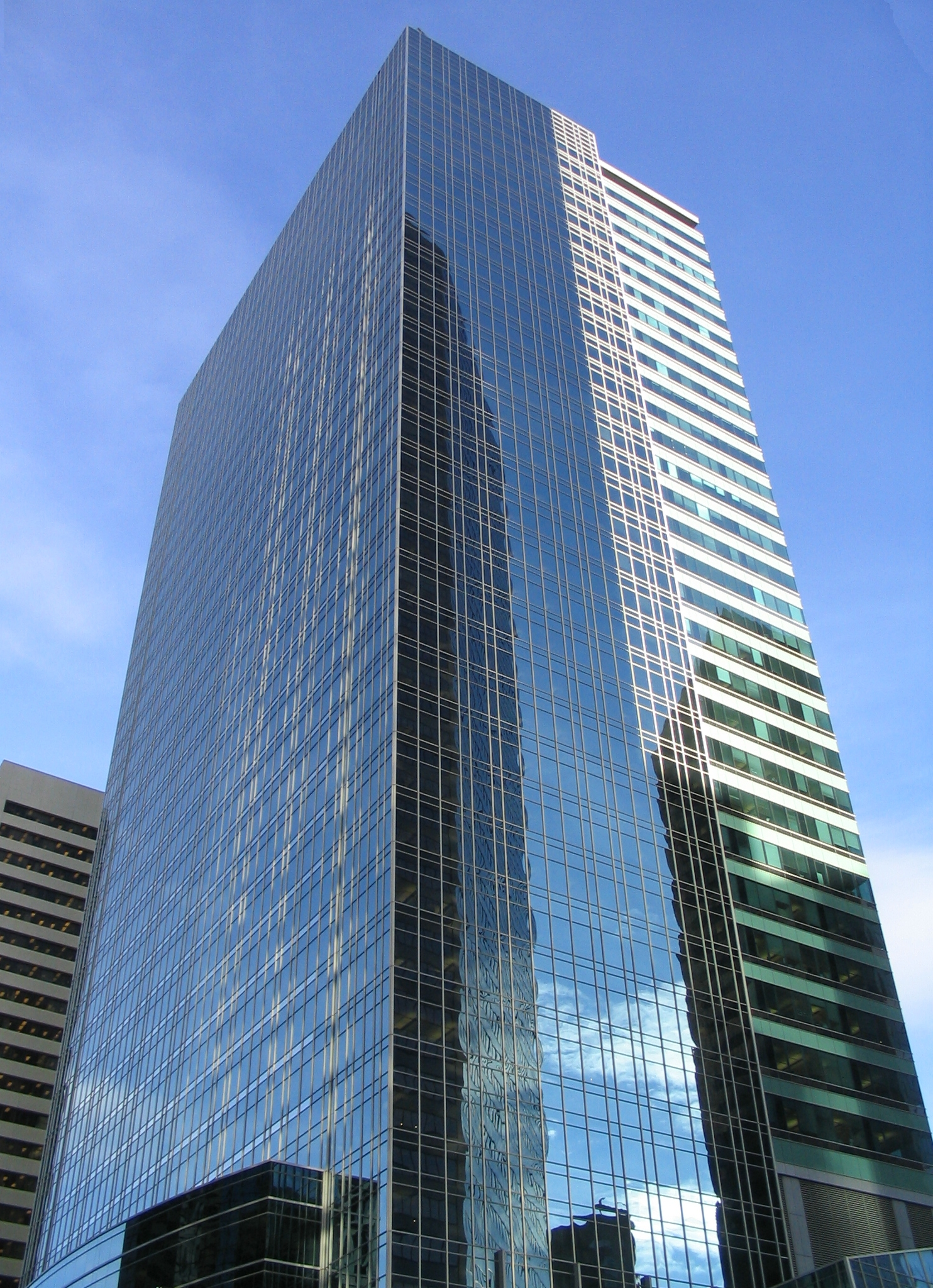
TC Energy Tower west face

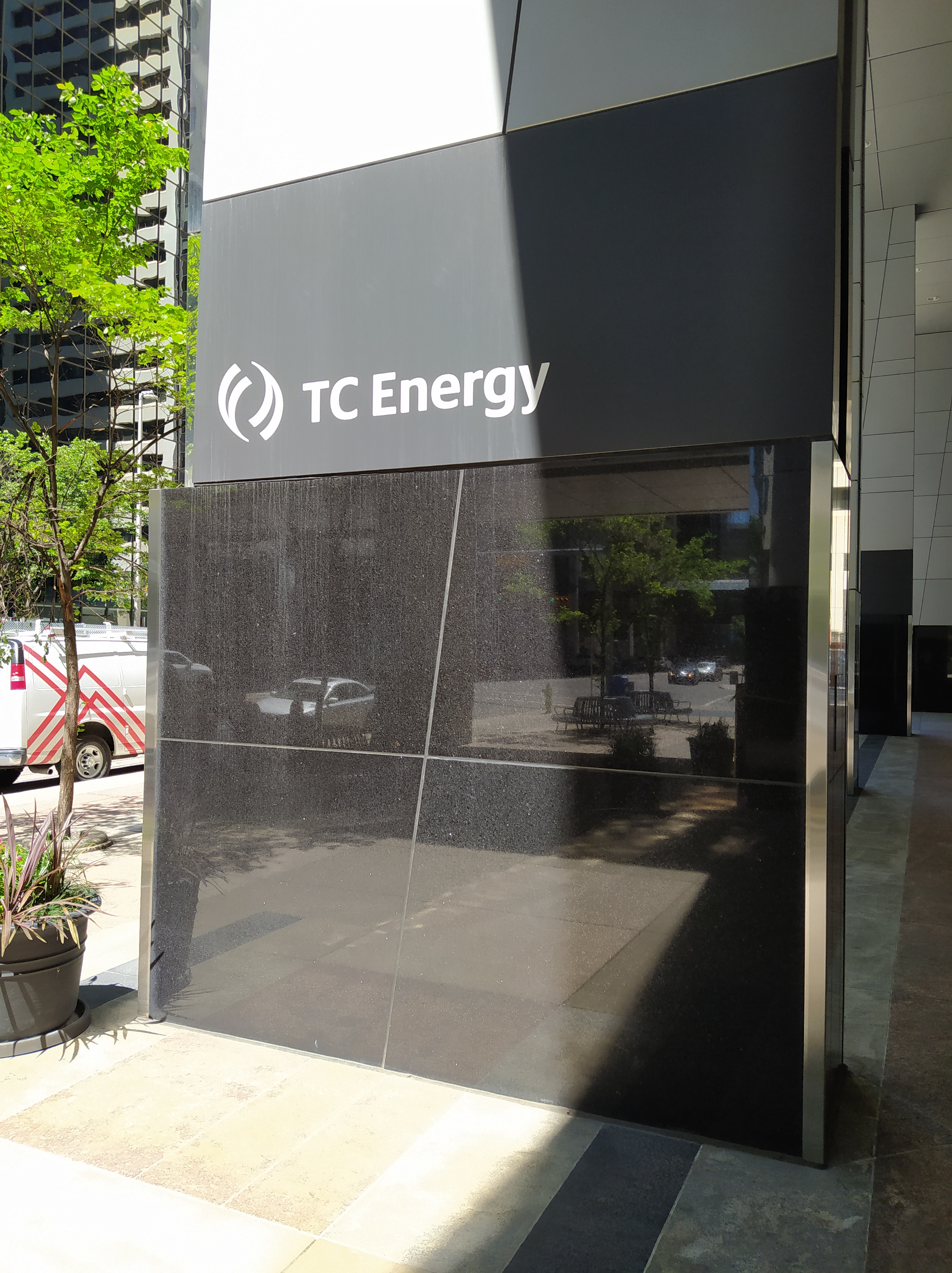
Logo of TC Energy Tower

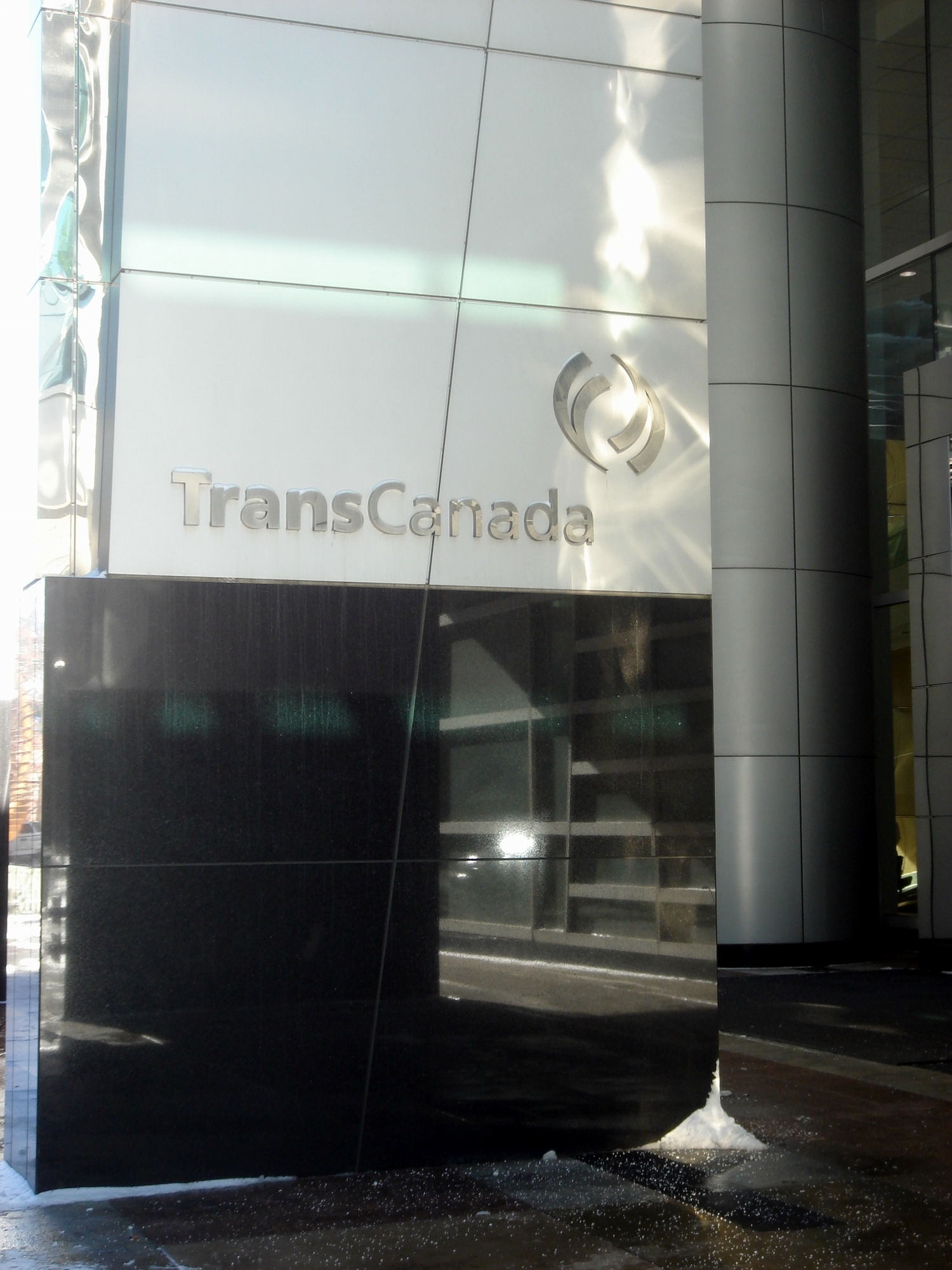
Logo of the former Trans Canada Tower
