= Stephen Avenue Place =

Office and retail hub in downtown Calgary, Alberta, Canada

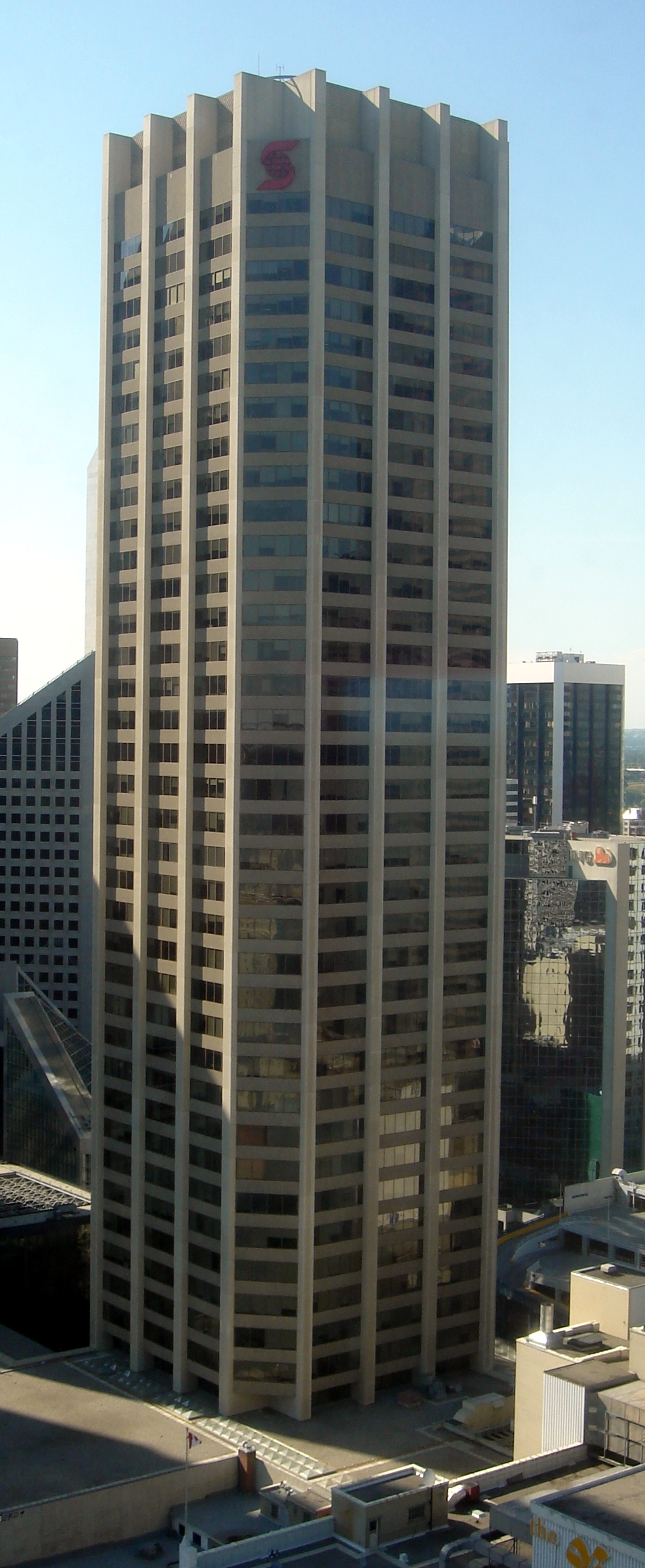
- Scotia Centre in 2007, prior to its redevelopment as Stephen Avenue Place
- Interactive map of the Stephen Avenue Place area

General information
- Location: Calgary, Alberta, Canada
- Coordinates: 51°02′46.7″N 114°04′01.7″W
- Construction started: 1974
- Completed: 1976
- Cost: $30,000,000
- Owner: Slate Asset Management
- Operator: Colliers International

Height
- Roof: 155 m (509 ft)
- Top floor: 40

Technical details
- Floor count: 41

Design and construction
- Architect: Zeidler Architecture
- Developer: Slate Asset Management

Stephen Avenue Place is an office and retail hub in The CORE in downtown Calgary, Alberta, Canada. The building was constructed concurrently with Scotia Tower in Vancouver, and the designs of the two towers followed similar concepts. Located at 700 2nd Street SW, it stands at 155 metres (509 feet) or 41-storeys tall and was the tallest building in Calgary at the time of its completion.

Formerly known as the Scotia Centre, after its namesake tenant Scotiabank, the building was purchased by Slate Asset Management in 2018 and was extensively renovated.

While under Slate Asset Management's ownership Stephen Avenue Place has been being placed under receivership in October 2023 and again in October 2025 by Timbercreek's Mortgage Servicing Inc and Computershare Trust Company who were owed approximately $139M.

Stephen Avenue Place is named for George Stephen, the first Baron Mount Stephen, who was the visionary, businessman and financier behind the creation of the Canadian Pacific Railway, and is the namesake of the adjacent Stephen Avenue.

== See also ==
- List of tallest buildings in Calgary
