= Plus 15 =

Pedestrian skywalk system in Calgary, Alberta, Canada

Coordinates: 51°2′50.05″N 114°4′8.19″W

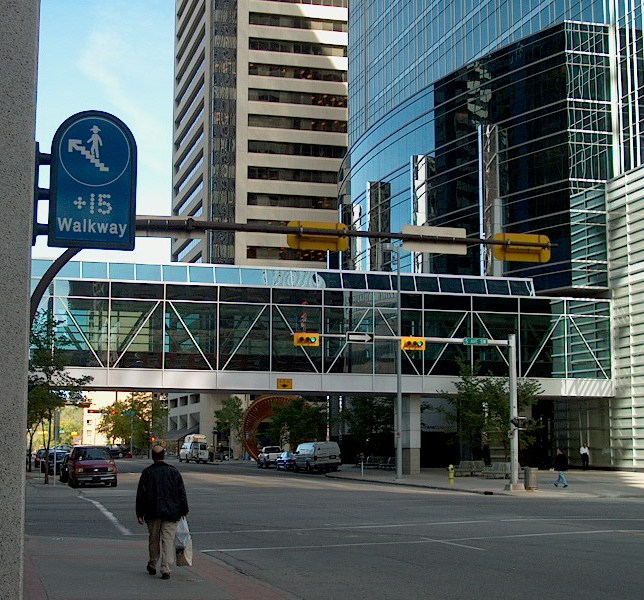
Facing north, Plus 15 sign and covered walkway linking the TC Energy Tower (formerly TransCanada Tower) (east) and Fifth Avenue Place

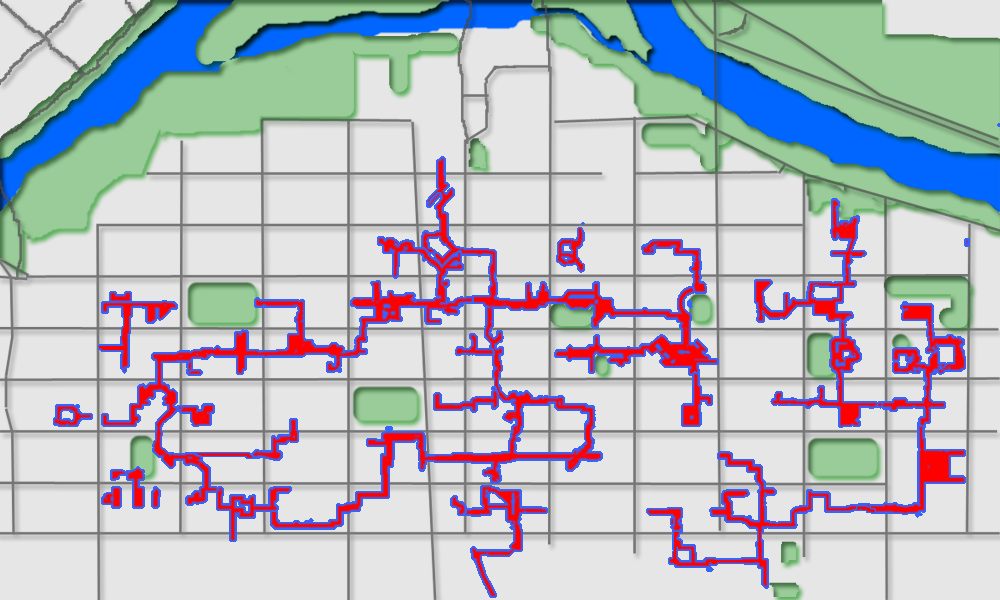
Plus 15 network in downtown Calgary

The Plus 15 or +15 is a skyway network in Calgary, Alberta, Canada. It is the world's most extensive pedestrian skywalk system, with a total length of 16 kilometres (10 miles) and 86 bridges connecting 130 buildings, as of 2022. Calgary often has severe winters and the walkways allow people to get around the city's downtown more quickly and comfortably. The busiest parts of the network saw over 20,000 pedestrians per day in a 2018 count.

The system is so named because the skywalks are approximately 15 feet (4.6 m) above street level. Some Plus 15 skywalks are multi-level, with higher levels being referred to as Plus 30s and Plus 45s.

== History ==
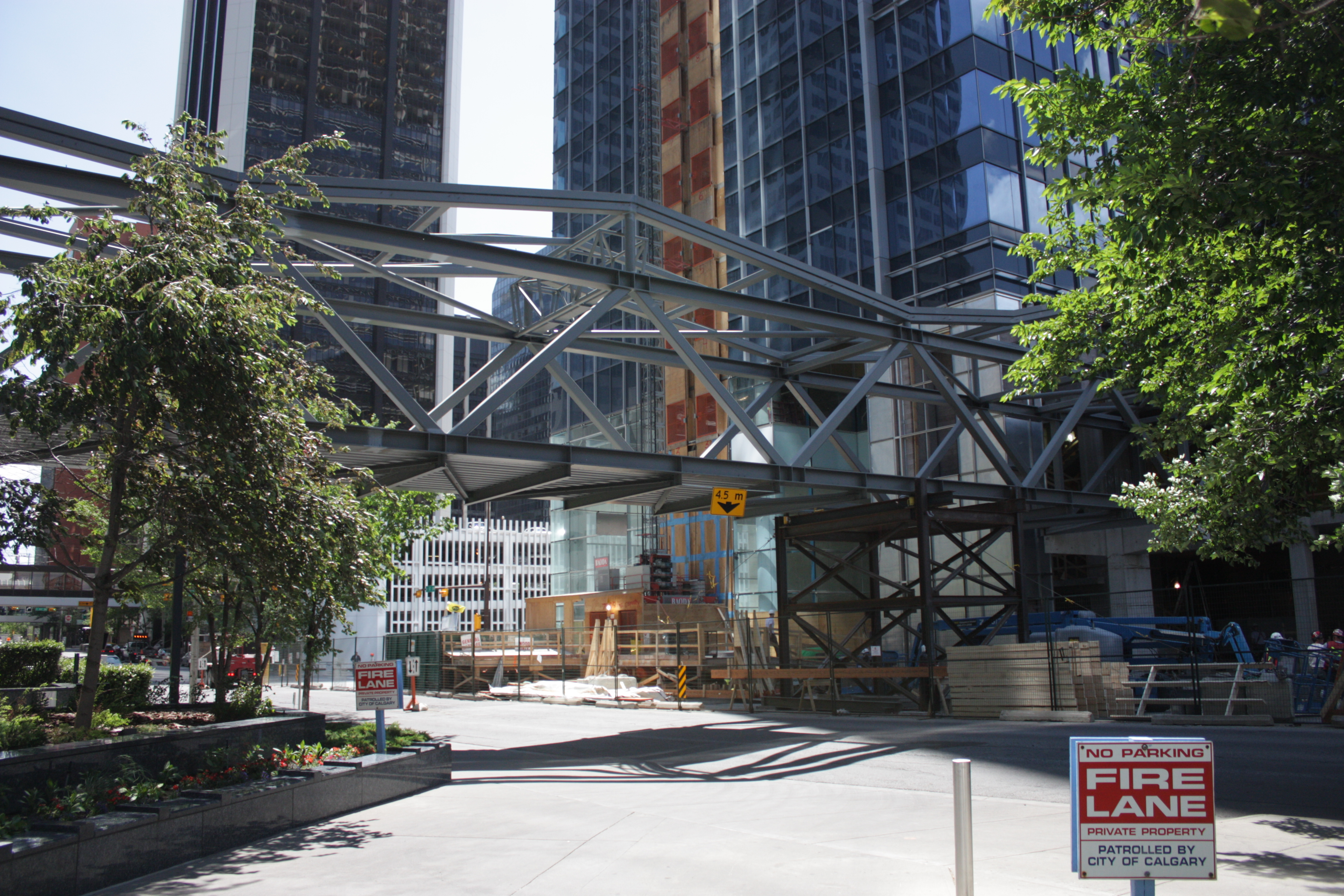
Plus 15 under construction between Centennial Place and the Canterra Tower in 2009

The system was conceived and designed by architect Harold Hanen, who worked for the Calgary Planning Department from 1966 to 1969. This development earned him the 1970 Vincent Massey Award for Merit in Urban Planning.

Opening in 1970, the Plus 15 network has expanded to include 86 enclosed bridges connecting 130 downtown Calgary buildings. The central core of the system is a series of enclosed shopping centres, and the city's flagship department stores.

New developments were required to connect to the walkway system; in exchange for this, they were offered more floorspace (the "bonus density"). When not physically able to connect to nearby buildings, developers contribute to the "Plus 15 Fund", managed by the city, used to finance other missing connections.

In 1985, graphic designer Lance Wyman created a wayfinding system featuring a person wearing a cowboy hat. In 2021, the city chose to rebrand the signs.

== Impact ==
Critics argue that the system has led to a decline in street life in the Downtown Commercial Core, while proponents cite extensive use of the system, enhancing the flow of human traffic to businesses downtown, especially in the winter.

In 1998, the city began to re-evaluate the system. Part of the goal of these studies was reinvigorating decreased daytime street life on some downtown streets. The possibility of limiting expansion to encourage more pedestrian street traffic was raised. Critics continue to claim the system is detrimental to culture and economic activity at ground level, however proponents argue that its heavy use points to how useful and convenient it is in cold weather.

City planning by-laws now confer tax credits to owners who connect new buildings to the system.

== List of connected buildings ==
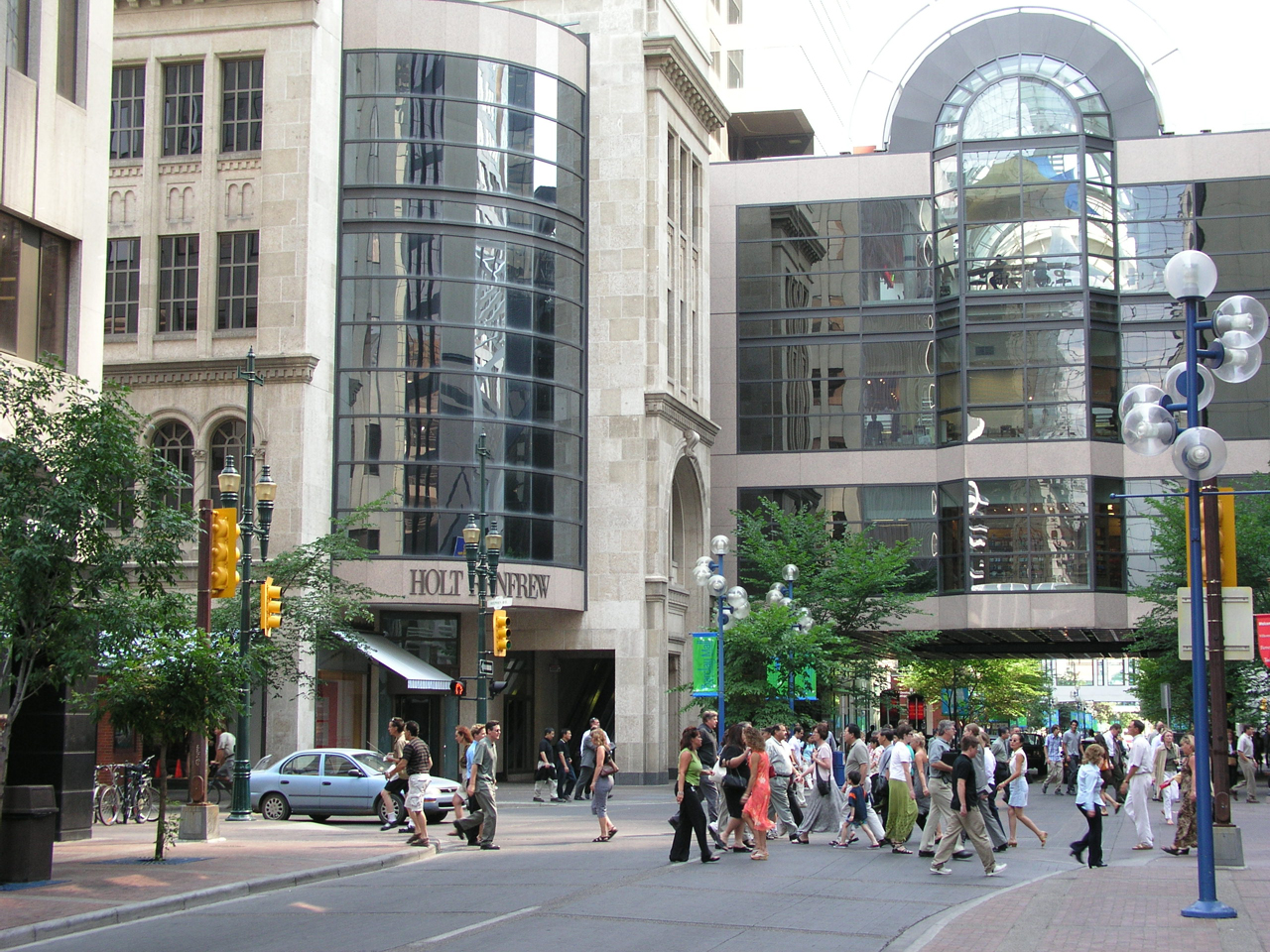
Facing north, the former three level skywalk at The Core Shopping Centre

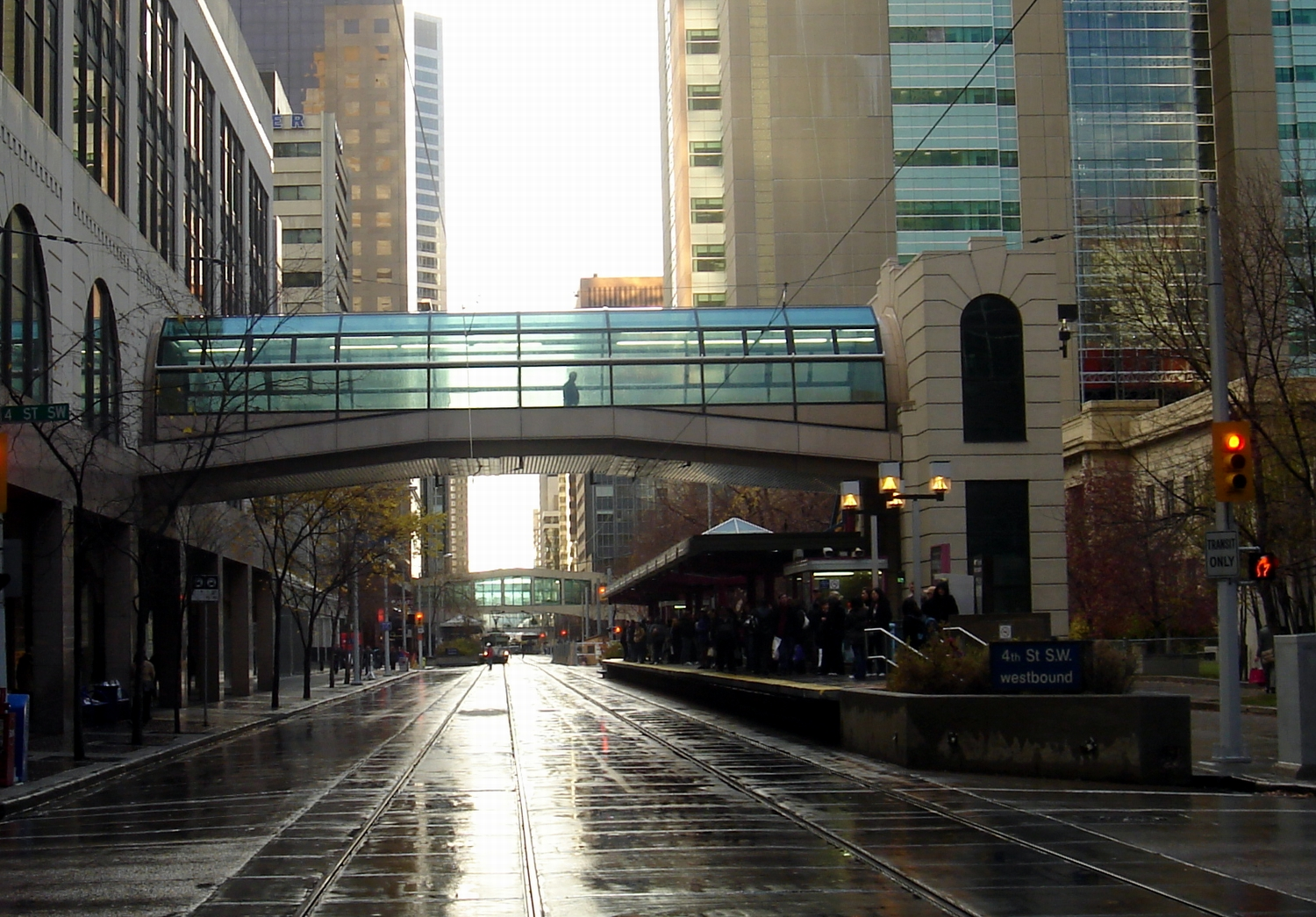
Facing west, previous skywalk over the C-Train tracks linking the downtown Holt Renfrew department store to the 4th Street Southwest LRT station before its reconstruction

- 333 5th Avenue
- 444 7th Avenue
- 505 3rd Street
- 550 5th Street
- 606 4th Street
- 635 8th Avenue
- 707 5th Street Manulife
- 715 5th Avenue
- 736 6th Avenue
- 840 7th Avenue
- Amec Place
- Alberta Energy Utilities Board
- Altius Centre
- Andrew Davison Building
- Aquitaine Tower
- Atrium I
- Atrium II
- Bank of Canada
- Bankers Court
- Bankers Hall
- Banker's Hall Parkade
- Bantrel Tower
- Bow Parkade
- Bow Valley College
- Bow Valley Square
- 420FOURTH (formerly BP Centre)
- Brookfield Place (Calgary)
- Calgary Board of Education
- Calgary House
- Calgary Marriott Hotel
- Calgary Place
- Calgary Tower
- Canada Place
- Canadian Fina Building
- Canterra Tower
- Carter House
- Centennial Parkade
- Centennial Place
- Centre Four
- Century Park Place
- Chamber of Commerce
- Chevron Plaza
- City Centre Parkade
- City Hall
- City/Omni Building
- Convention Centre North
- Convention Centre South
- Core Shopping Centre (Formerly TD Square/Calgary Eaton Centre)
- Daon Building
- Delta Bow Valley Inn
- Devonian Gardens
- Dome Tower
- Dominion Centre
- Eau Claire Place II
- Eighth Avenue Place
- Elveden Centre
- Emerson Centre
- Encana Place
- Encor Place
- Epcore Centre
- Ernst and Young Tower
- Fairmont Palliser Hotel
- Fifth and Fifth
- Fifth Avenue Place
- First Alberta Place
- First Canadian Centre
- Fourth and Fourth
- Fracmaster Tower
- Glenbow Museum
- Gulf Canada Square
- Hanover Place
- Harry Hayes Government of Canada
- Hawthorn Hotel and Suites
- Hollinsworth Building
- Holt Renfrew Department Store
- Home Oil Tower
- Hyatt Regency Hotel
- Intact Place
- International Hotel
- Iveagh House
- J.J. Bowen Building
- Jamieson Place
- Lancaster Building
- Life Plaza
- Livingston Place
- London House
- Mobil Tower
- Monenco Place
- Municipal Building
- Nexen Building
- Northland Building
- Northland Place
- Palliser South
- Palliser Square
- Panarctic Centre
- Pertogen Building
- Petex Building
- Petroleum Building
- Place 800
- Old Police Headquarters Building
- Provincial Court
- Ramada Hotel
- Rocky Mountain Court
- Rocky Mountain Plaza
- Roslyn Building
- Royal Bank
- Sandman Inn
- Sanjel Building
- Scotia Bank Tower
- Scotia Centre
- Selkirk House
- Shell Centre
- Sheraton Suites
- St. Regis Hotel
- Standard Life
- Stock Exchange Tower
- Suncor Energy Centre
- Sun Life Plaza
- TD Canada Trust Tower
- TELUS House Calgary
- The Bay Department Store
- The Bow
- TC Energy Tower (formerly TransCanada Tower)
- Trimac House
- Watermark Tower
- Western Canadian Place
- Western Union
- Westin Hotel
- Workers Compensation Board Office
- YWCA

== In popular culture ==
The Plus 15 is one of the central plot elements in the 2000 film Waydowntown, directed by Gary Burns.

== See also ==
- List of attractions and landmarks in Calgary
- Skyway
- Edmonton Pedway
- Underground City, Montreal
- PATH (Toronto)
