= Waydowntown =

waydowntown
- Directed by: Gary Burns
- Written by: Gary Burns; James Martin
- Produced by: Gary Burns; Shirley Vercruysse
- Starring: Fabrizio Filippo; Marya Delver; Gordon Currie; Tobias Godson; Tammy Isbell; Jennifer Clement; James McBurney; Don McKellar
- Cinematography: Patrick McLaughlin
- Edited by: Mark Lemmon
- Music by: John Abram
- Distributed by: United States: HomeVision; Lot 47 Films; Canada: Odeon Films; Alliance Atlantis; CTV; Telefilm Canada; Australia: Madman Entertainment
- Release date: September 10, 2000
- Running time: 87 minutes
- Language: English
- Budget: $700,000 CAD (estimated)

Waydowntown (stylized as waydowntown) is a 2000 Canadian film directed by Gary Burns and starring Fab Filippo, Don McKellar, Marya Delver and Michelle Beaudoin. The film is a dark comedy that explores office culture and its effects and often uses surrealism to achieve its thematic goals.

The film is set in Calgary, Alberta, where many downtown buildings are connected by the Plus 15, an extensive network of indoor skywalks. Because of this network, the hustle and bustle of the traditional "main street" has been replaced by recirculated air, food courts, and fluorescent lights. The result is a bleak and often humorous dark comedy about Canadian corporate culture.

== Plot ==
The film centres on a group of office colleagues in downtown Calgary, Alberta, who bet a month's salary on who can last the longest without going outside by using the system of covered walkways that connect the buildings. The film takes place over one lunch hour on day 24 of the month-long competition. Things start to become complicated as the office prepares for the company founder's retirement party.

The film's title is derived from a particular form of suicide where one smashes the (non-openable) window of one's high-rise office and then jumps through. In the movie, one of the characters has accumulated a 2-litre pop bottle full of marbles in the hopes of breaking his window. The dark joke for this is referenced in the film : "a 15 bus takes you downtown, [but] a bottle of marbles takes you way downtown."

== Cast ==
- Fab Filippo as Tom Bennett
- Don McKellar as Brad
- Marya Delver as Sandra West
- Gordon Currie as Curt Schwin
- Jennifer Clement as Vicki
- Tammy Isbell as Kathy
- Tobias Godson as Randy
- James McBurney as Phil

== Production ==
The majority of the film was shot in TD Square, the Calgary Eaton Centre, and Bankers Hall. The company's offices are situated in the TD Canada Trust Tower. The low-budget film was shot digitally and later transferred to 35 mm.

== Reception ==
The film has a 70% freshness rating on Rotten Tomatoes. Most critics praise the satirical elements, casting, and plot. Others find the film to be humourless and incomplete, and the plot to be too nonsensical and uninteresting. The film won the Best Canadian Film Award prize at the 2000 Toronto International Film Festival.

In 2001, an industry poll conducted by Playback named it the 10th best Canadian film of the preceding 15 years.

The film was shown at the Calgary International Film Festival on September 19, 2019, to celebrate its 20th anniversary.

In 2023, Barry Hertz of The Globe and Mail named the film as one of the 23 best Canadian comedy films ever made.

In 2025, in celebration of the film's 25th anniversary, the film was shown at Revue Cinema in Toronto as part of the 11th annual National Canadian Film Day.

== See also ==
- Office Space
