= Devonian gardens =

Indoor botanical park in downtown Calgary

Devonian Gardens
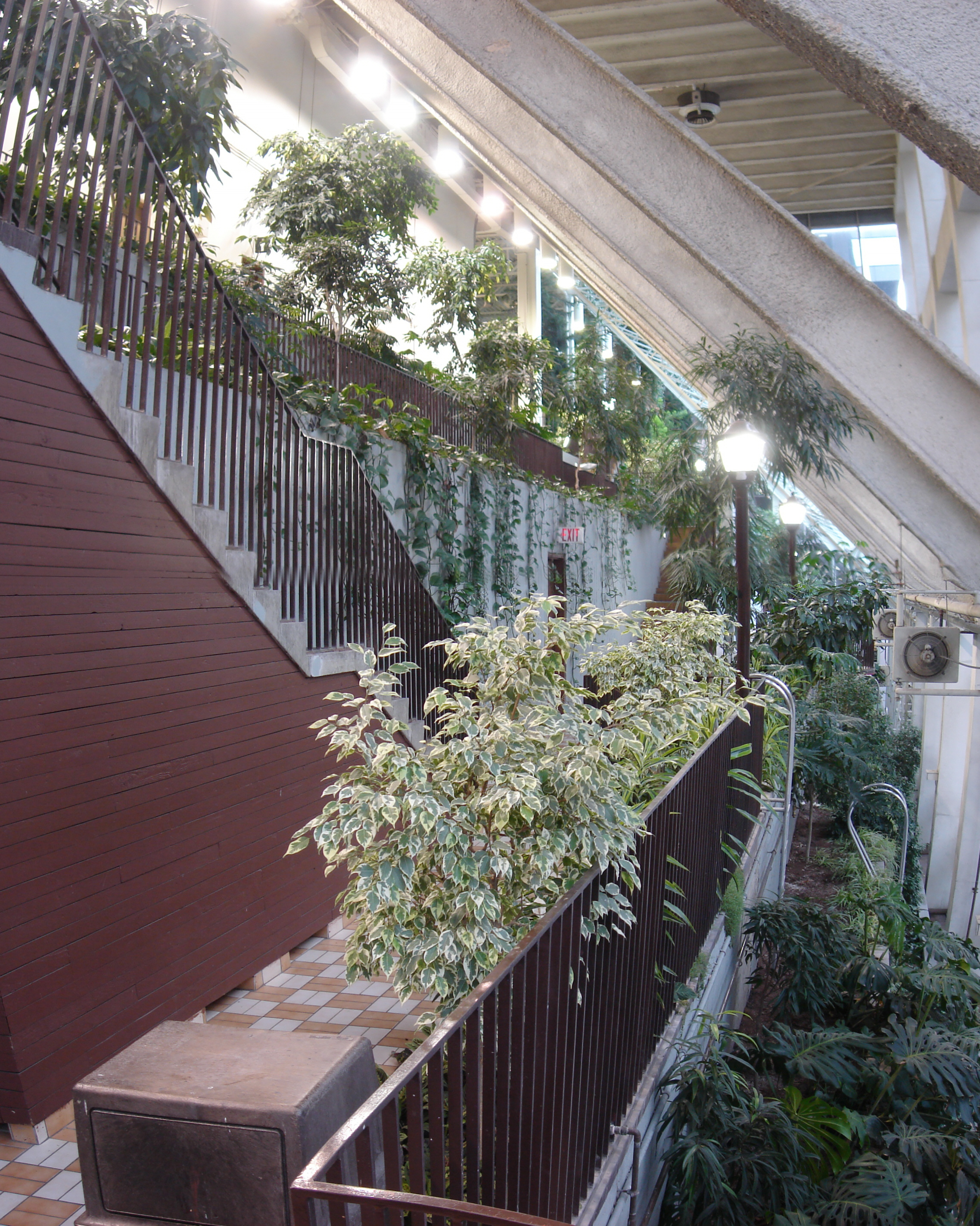
- The original Devonian Gardens
- Interactive map of Devonian Gardens
- Type: Indoor botanical garden and urban park
- Location: Downtown Calgary, Alberta, Canada
- Area: 2.5 acres (1.0 ha)
- Created: 1977
- Designer: J. H. Cook Architects and Engineers
- Operator: City of Calgary Parks
- Status: Open

Devonian Gardens is a large indoor park and botanical garden located in the downtown core of Calgary, Alberta, Canada. In 2012 a major $37-million renovation was completed. Located on the Stephen Avenue pedestrian mall (8 Avenue SW) between 2 Street SW and 3 Street SW, the park is completely enclosed with glass and covers 2.5 acres (10,000 m^{2}) (one full city block) on the top floor of The Core Shopping Centre. It is maintained by The City of Calgary Parks.

The gardens include a 900 sq ft living wall, koi ponds, fountains, a children's play area, and over 550 trees, along with meeting and function spaces for special events.

The original gardens contained more than 20,000 plants representing 135 tropical and local species, decorated with waterfalls, bridges, koi ponds and sculptures by local artists, showcased as a permanent art exhibition.

== History ==
=== Conception and opening (1970s) ===
Opened in 1977, Devonian Gardens was designed by J. H. Cook Architects and Engineers and donated to the City of Calgary by the Devonian Group of Charitable Foundations and Calford Properties. The interior park was considered part of the Oxford/TD Square development in Calgary's core and construction costs came to more than 9 million dollars. It was officially opened to the public on 14 September 1977.

=== Closure and four-year renovation (2008 to 2012) ===
A major redevelopment of The Core Shopping Centre required a full garden shutdown beginning in 2008, requiring the gardens to close for renovations for four years. The City committed 37 million dollars to overhaul aging infrastructure, add a biofilter living wall, and replant the collection. The gardens reopened on 27 June 2012 and added food court seating, a playground and space for corporate events. Landscape architecture and planning was done by Design Workshop Architects.

=== Warranty work and later reopening (2016 to 2018) ===
In July 2016 the city announced a temporary closure to address warranty issues in planter beds; repairs included removing and flood-testing planters to stop leaks into shops below. Additional leaks found later that year pushed the reopening into 2017, with sections phased as work progressed, and full public reopening came in 2018.

== Design and setting ==
The Gardens occupy the top level of The CORE, integrated with the +15 network and food court. The mall's 2011 redevelopment installed a continuous suspended glass skylight spanning three city blocks, reported at roughly 85 feet wide and 656 feet long, which increases natural light for the Gardens below. The indoor park footprint is about one hectare, contiguous across the block between 2 Street SW and 3 Street SW on 8 Avenue SW.

== Operations and events ==
=== Visitor use ===
Devonian Gardens functions as a downtown indoor green space that is open to the public without admission fees. It's considered as Calgary's only indoor park, that's open year-round and accessible from the +15 network and C-Train.

The Gardens follow the hours of The Core Shopping Centre, generally Monday to Saturday from 10:00 am to 6:00 pm, and Sunday from 12:00 pm to 5:00 pm.

=== Event bookings ===
The City of Calgary rents portions of the Gardens for private use. Venues include the Garden Terrace (capacity 200), the Terrace (capacity 250), and the Whole Terrace (capacity 350). Smaller areas such as the South Garden, Event Room, Gallery, Circle Garden, and Boardroom accommodate groups from 16 to 220. Together, these spaces provide over 14,172 square feet of bookable area with a maximum overall capacity of about 726 guests at one time. Bookings can include services such as seating, cleaning, and permits for photography. The city offers packages for weddings, birthday parties, and corporate meetings.

Bookable spaces at Devonian Gardens
Venue	Approx. size (sq ft)	Capacity
Garden Terrace	6,910	200
Terrace	5,683	250
Whole Terrace	12,593	350
South Garden	260.5	100
Event Room	1,135.5	80
Gallery	N/A	220
Circle Garden	947	40
Boardroom	397	16

=== Community programs ===
A pilot initiative (currently suspended) permitted local groups such as choirs or dance ensembles to hold short performances at the Gardens during lunch hours, while maintaining public access. The Gardens have also been used for student programming. The University of Calgary's International Student Services, for example, has included walking tours of the park in orientation activities.

=== Educational and interactive use ===
An interactive mobile program titled Agents of Nature has been used at the Gardens to provide scavenger-hunt style activities focused on plant life.

=== Exhibitions ===
The Gardens have been used as a venue for temporary exhibitions, including art and cultural events organized in partnership with local institutions such as the Alberta University of the Arts. Other public exhibitions have been staged in coordination with community partners and event organizers.

== See also ==
- The Core (shopping centre)
- Stephen Avenue
