= Centennial Place =

Centennial Place may mean:

- Centennial Place (Calgary)
- Centennial Place (Atlanta)
