= TD Tower =

TD Tower may refer to:

- the six towers of Toronto-Dominion Centre, Toronto, Ontario, Canada
- TD Tower (Vancouver), British Columbia, Canada
- TD Centre (Halifax, Nova Scotia), Canada
- TD Tower (Edmonton), Alberta, Canada
- TD Canada Trust Tower, at Brookfield Place (Toronto), Ontario, Canada
- TD Canada Trust Tower (Calgary), Alberta, Canada
