= Marya Delver =

Canadian actress

Marya Delver (born August 9, 1974, in Melfort, Saskatchewan) is a Canadian actress. She is most noted for her role as Laurel in the 2001 film Last Wedding, for which she was a Genie Award nominee for Best Supporting Actress at the 22nd Genie Awards, and her recurring role as Officer Eglee in Sons of Anarchy.

Her other roles have included the films Better Than Chocolate, Here's to Life! and Waydowntown, as well as a recurring role in Leap Years. In 2003, she starred alongside Fabrizio Filippo and Marcello Cabezas in a production of Kenneth Lonergan's This Is Our Youth, which was directed by Woody Harrelson.

== Filmography ==
=== Film ===
| Year | Title | Role | Notes |
|---|---|---|---|
| 1998 | Dirty | Cindy | |
| 1999 | Better Than Chocolate | Carla | |
| 2000 | Dangerous Attraction | Meghan | |
| 2000 | Waydowntown | Sandra West | |
| 2000 | Here's to Life! | Carley | |
| 2000 | No More Monkeys Jumpin' on the Bed | Louise | |
| 2001 | Camouflage | Lori | |
| 2001 | Last Wedding | Laurel | |
| 2006 | Monkey Warfare | Bike Girl | |
| 2019 | No Apology | Dr. Zimmerman | |

=== Television ===
| Year | Title | Role | Notes |
|---|---|---|---|
| 1997 | Millennium | Nanny Annie | Episode: "Powers, Principalities, Thrones and Dominions" |
| 1997 | Medusa's Child | Patty | Television film |
| 1997 | Madison | Bonita | Episode: "Opportunity Knocks" |
| 1998 | Alien Abduction: Incident in Lake County | Melanie | Television film |
| 1998 | Viper | Marguerite | Episode: "Trust No One" |
| 1998 | The Sentinel | Jackie Simms | Episode: "Crossroads" |
| 1998 | The Crow: Stairway to Heaven | Keshia | Episode: "Like It's 1999" |
| 1998 | The Net | Belinda | Episode: "Lucy's Life" |
| 1999 | Poltergeist: The Legacy | Diane Cross | 2 episodes |
| 1999 | The New Addams Family | Gloria | Episode: "Lights, Camera, Addams!" |
| 1999 | Stargate SG-1 | Layle | Episode: "Past and Present" |
| 2000 | Beggars and Choosers | LGT Receptionist | Episode: "Russian Roulette" |
| 2000 | Twice in a Lifetime | Didi | Episode: "The Escape Artist" |
| 2000 | Level 9 | Beth Anderson | Episode: "Digital Babylon" |
| 2001 | Mysterious Ways | Darlene | Episode: "19A" |
| 2001 | Leap Years | Various roles | 7 episodes |
| 2003 | Degrassi: The Next Generation | Fancy / Connie | Episode: "Episode: "White Wedding: Part 2" |
| 2003 | Sue Thomas: F.B.Eye | Laura Greenley | Episode: "The Leak" |
| 2006 | 1-800-Missing | Carol Eisenberg | Episode: "So Shall Ye Reap" |
| 2008 | A Woman's Rage | Becky | Television film |
| 2008–2014 | Sons of Anarchy | Officer Eglee | 20 episodes |
| 2020 | Tony the Tutor | Angela D' Anthony | Miniseries |
