= Downtown Calgary =

- Neighbourhood
- Downtown Calgary seen from the south

- Location of Downtown Commercial Core in Calgary
- Coordinates: 51°02′53″N 114°04′17″W
- Country: Canada
- Province: Alberta
- City: Calgary
- Quadrant: SW & SE
- Wards: 7, 8
- Established: 1875

Government
  - Mayor: Jeromy Farkas
  - Administrative body: Calgary City Council
  - Councillors: Myke Atkinson (Independent) Nathaniel Schmidt (Independent)
  - MP: Greg McLean (Conservative)
  - MLA: Joe Ceci (New Democratic)

Area
  - Total: 6.0 km^{2} (2.3 sq mi)
- Elevation: 1,045 m (3,428 ft)

Population (2021)
  - Total: 46,763
  - Density: 7,800/km^{2} (20,000/sq mi)
  - Average Income: $30,126
- Time zone: UTC-6 (Alberta Time)
- Website: Calgary Downtown

Downtown Calgary is a dense urban district in central Calgary, Alberta. It contains the second largest concentration of head offices in Canada, despite only being the country's third largest city in terms of population. The downtown is divided into several residential, commercial, corporate, and mixed-use neighbourhoods, including the Financial District (CBD), Eau Claire, Chinatown, East Village, Beltline, and the West End.

Downtown Calgary is bordered by 14th Street W. on the west, the Bow River and Prince's Island Park on the north, the Elbow River on the east and the CPR mainline tracks on the south. The neighbourhoods of the Beltline and Mission to the immediate south are often considered part of downtown, due to the high concentrations of businesses, high population densities, and occurrence of retail and nightlife opportunities, but strictly speaking they are not technically part of downtown.

The population of Calgary's downtown has grown substantially in recent years, growing by several thousand between 2011 and 2016. With the population of the five combined downtown neighbourhoods surpassing 18,000 as of 2016, Downtown Calgary now has a significantly larger population than that of other Canadian cities of similar size, such as Ottawa and Edmonton. While Downtown Calgary continues to grow, the Beltline neighbourhood to the immediate south, with a population of 21,958 as of 2016, is taking up the majority of residential development in inner city Calgary.

Calgary Transit's CTrain light rail system runs down 7th Avenue S. through the middle of downtown in an east–west direction, and the ride is free on this section. The future Green Line will run underground through downtown under 2nd Street, in a north–south direction.

== Neighbourhoods ==
=== Commercial core ===
Calgary's dense business area comprises the bulk of the downtown community. It is a core of skyscrapers. As of February 2017, eight of the ten tallest buildings in western Canada, and a few of the tallest in the country, are in Calgary. It is arguably the densest downtown area of any city of its size in North America. Many of the buildings are connected via an 18 km (11 mi) long network of elevated walkways and bridges. The system, known as the "+15" is the largest of its kind in the world.

The area surrounding the Stephen Avenue Walk is Downtown Calgary's primary retail area. Stephen Avenue (8th Avenue SW) is a pedestrian mall lined with historic buildings containing stores, restaurants, cinemas, and drinking establishments. Immediately adjacent to the outdoor portion of Stephen Avenue is an indoor complex of two shopping malls. The malls, The Core Shopping Centre (formerly TD Square/Calgary Eaton Centre) and the Scotia Centre are bordered at either end by the historic Hudson's Bay Company store and Holt Renfrew's upscale department store. The street is also home to a number of galleries, restaurants, pubs, off-beat cinemas, and nightclubs. Other attractions in the commercial core include the Devonian Gardens in The Core, the Calgary Tower, the Art Gallery of Calgary, The Glenbow Museum, Olympic Plaza, Arts Commons, and the Telus Convention Centre.

The commercial core is also divided into a number of districts. They include the Entertainment District/Stephen Avenue, The Olympic Plaza and Cultural District, and the Government District.

==== Government district ====
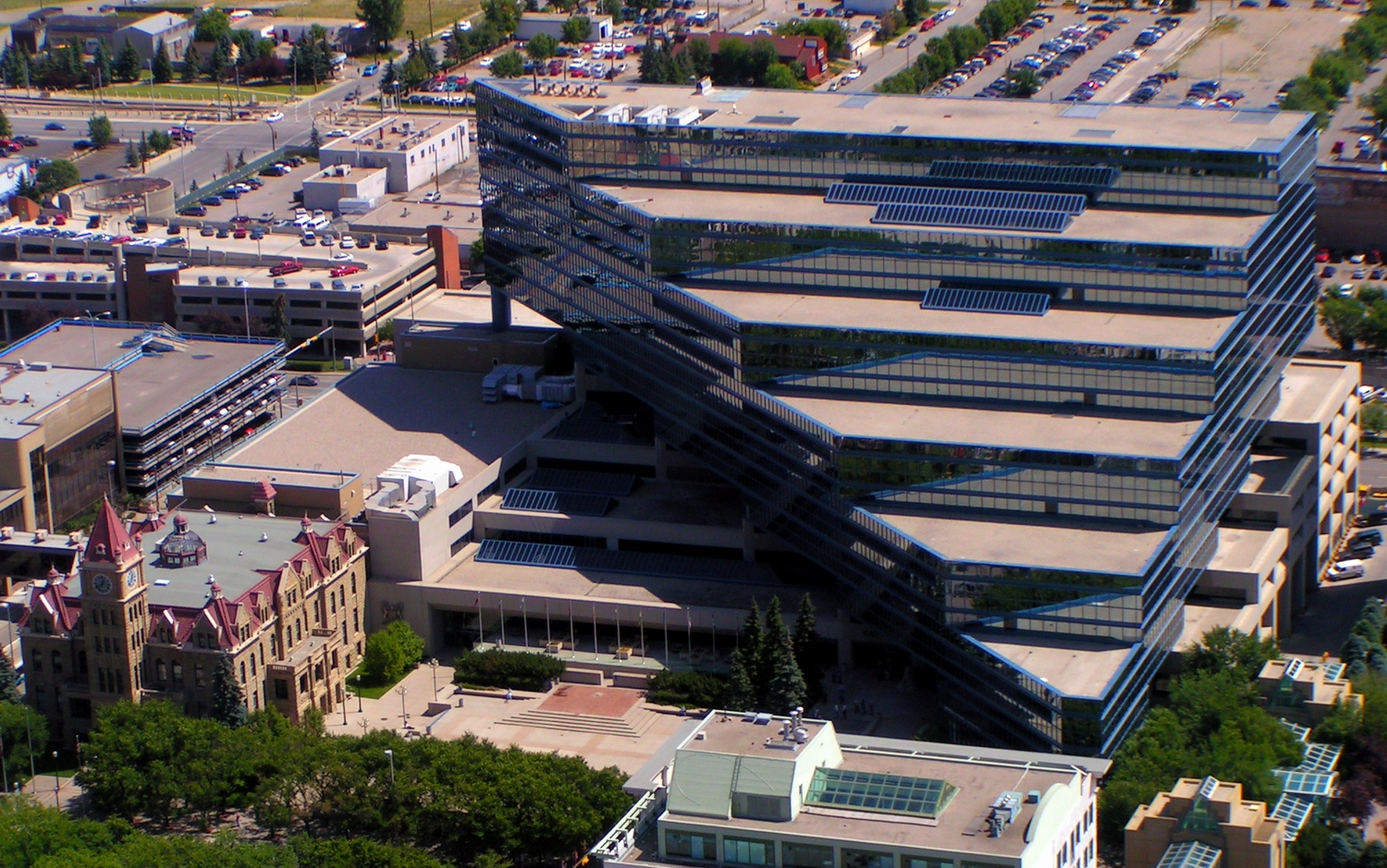
Calgary Municipal Building, the seat of local government, is located in an informal subdivision in Downtown known as the Government District.

The government district is an informal subdivision of the downtown core, and is centered along Macleod Trail, between the commercial core, Chinatown and Downtown East Village. It contains the City Hall, the Calgary Public Library, the Calgary Police headquarters, the Harry Hays building (federal government), Bow Valley College, the United States consulate and the Calgary Board of Education among other buildings.

==== Cultural district ====
The cultural district is centered on the Burns Building and Olympic Plaza, and contains educational and cultural venues such as Bow Valley College, Glenbow Museum and Arts Commons, including The Big Secret Theatre (home of One Yellow Rabbit theatre company), Jack Singer Concert Hall (home of Calgary Philharmonic Orchestra), Max Bell Theatre (home of Theatre Calgary), Martha Cohen Theatre (home of Alberta Theatre Projects), and Engineered Air Theatre.

A statue of The Famous Five stands between Stephen Avenue and Olympic Plaza.

==== Entertainment district ====
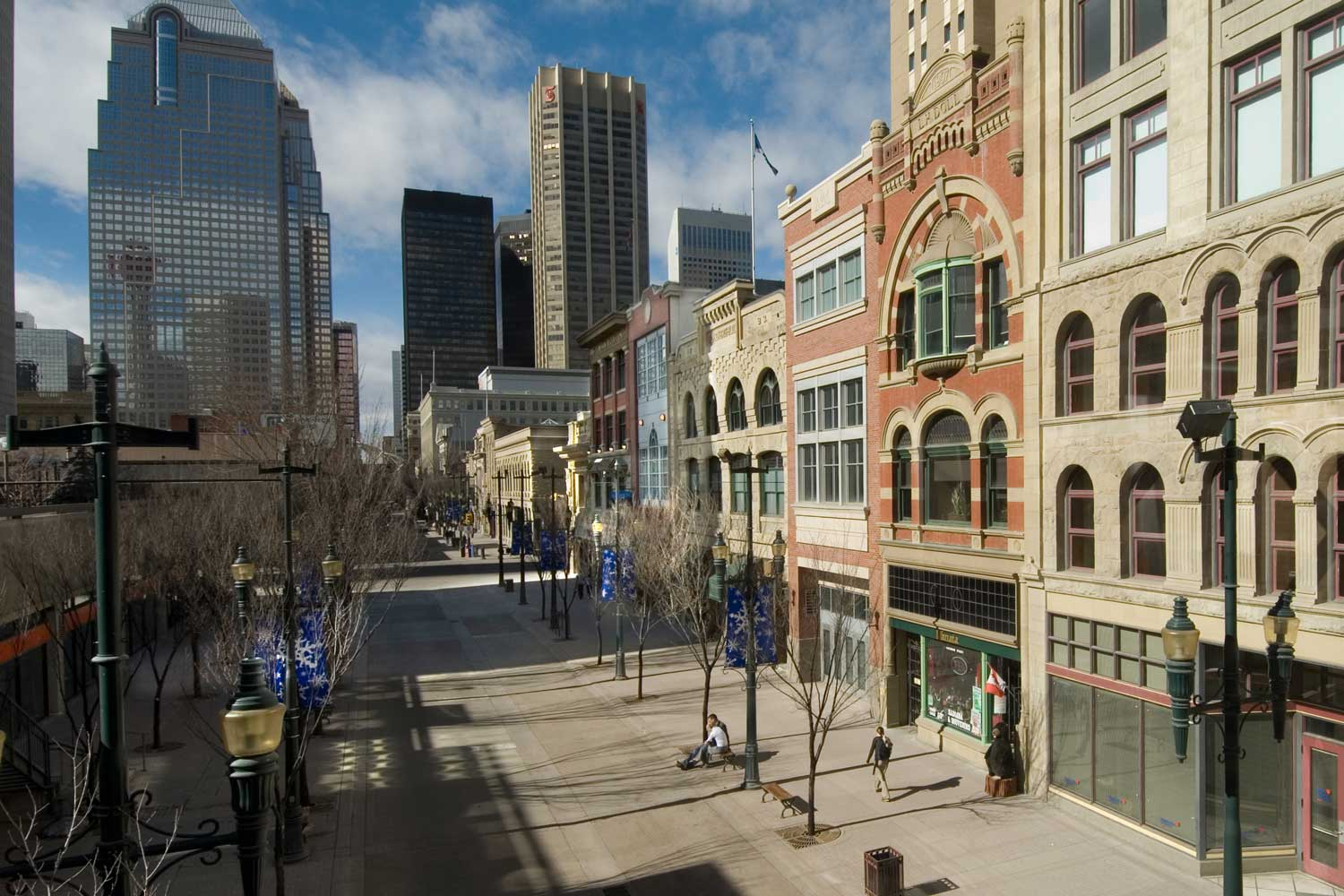
Stephen Avenue is a pedestrian mall located in the commercial core's entertainment district.

The entertainment district is located along 8th Avenue South. It contains the pedestrian mall of Stephen Avenue, lined with restaurants and shops, enclosed shopping centres (including The Core, Scotia Centre, Bankers Hall and The Bay), as well as Calgary's only art house movie theater (the Globe Cinema) and recreation areas such as the Devonian Gardens. Landmark buildings found in this district include the Hyatt Regency Hotel, which incorporates several historic buildings into its facade, the Calgary Marriott and Fairmont Palliser Hotel. Landmark skyscrapers in this district are Scotia Centre, Bankers Hall, and Eighth Avenue Place.

The "Udderly Art Legacy Pasture", a collection of decorated fiberglass cows built in 2000, is hosted mainly in the Centennial Parkade, while other particular exponates are spread throughout the city.

=== East Village ===
The East Village is an area to the east of the Downtown Commercial Core. This area was plagued by crime and homelessness for a long time. However, the area has seen a great amount of redevelopment since the late 2000s. In 2007, the Calgary Municipal Land Corporation began construction on $357 million worth of infrastructure upgrades to the neighbourhood, bringing all streets above flood plain levels, upgrading sewers and storm drains, and building plazas.

The neighbourhood has since become a new hot-spot for the downtown area, playing host to the award-winning RiverWalk, several restaurants in the historic Simmons Mattress Factory building, and several new condo towers, with several more under construction. The neighbourhood is host to the $191 million National Music Centre of Canada, and will be host to the $245 million New Central Library of the Calgary Public Library system. Since the redevelopment has started, the neighbourhood has seen $2.7 billion worth of investment.

=== West End ===
The West End is a high-rise, high-density residential neighbourhood to the west of the Downtown Commercial Core. The neighbourhood is home to Millennium Park, which plays host to a large skate park, and is the home of the Calgary Pride celebration every September. The Downtown West - Kerby C-Train station serves the community. Downtown West End is also well connected into the Plus 15 skywalk system.

=== Chinatown ===
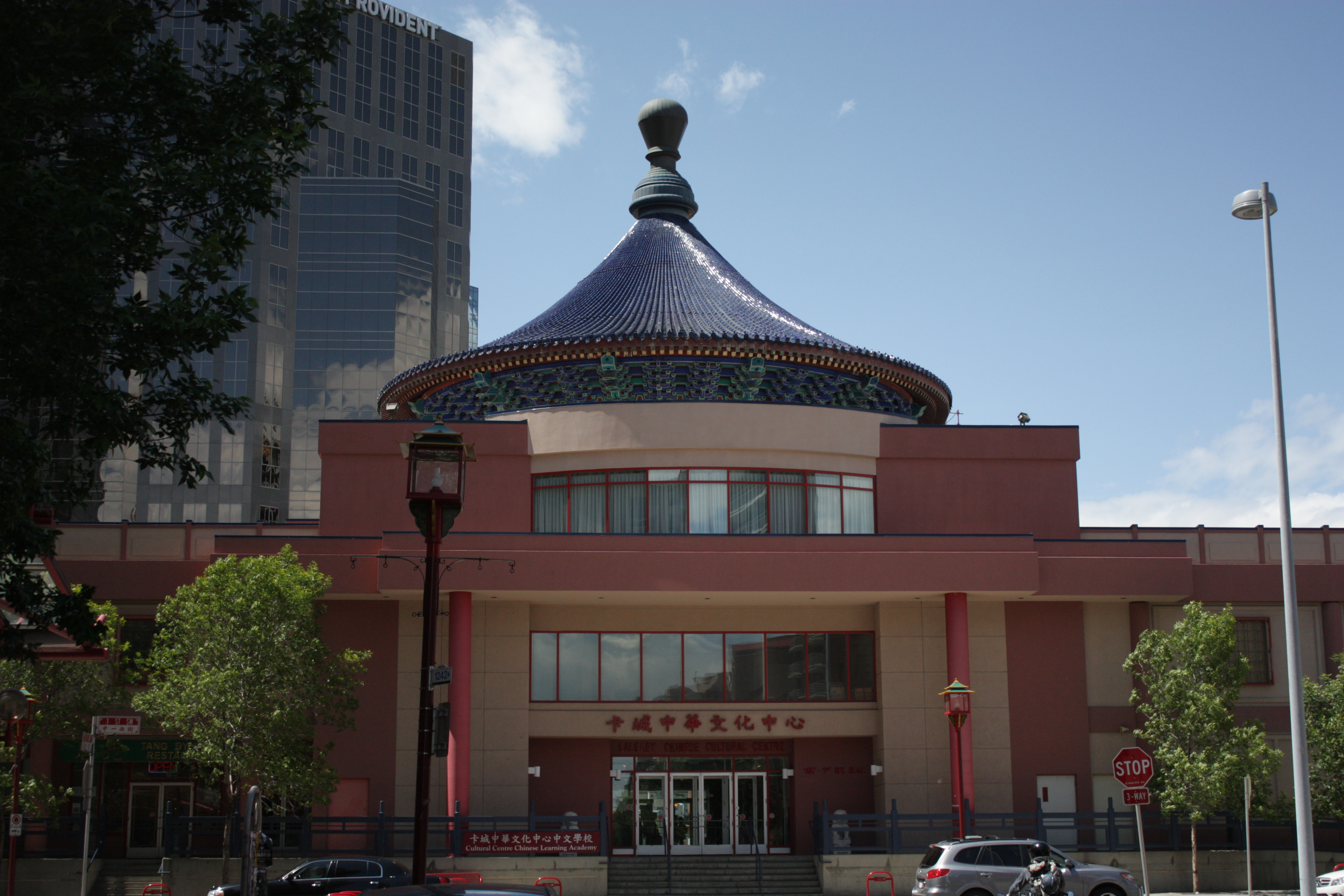
The Calgary Chinese Cultural Centre in Chinatown, a neighbourhood located north of the commercial core.

Chinatown is located directly north of the Downtown Commercial Core and northwest of the East Village. The neighbourhood is characterized by high-density living and a high density of East Asian retail and restaurants. Calgary's Chinatown is home to the largest Chinese Cultural Centre in North America. Designed in a traditional style, the cultural centre's roof is modelled after the Temple of Heaven in Beijing. Chinatown Calgary has an area redevelopment plan in place with work continuing towards revitalizing the neighbourhood. The neighbourhood also contains Dragon City Mall, the only traditional Chinese-inspired shopping mall in Alberta.

=== Eau Claire ===
Eau Claire is a neighbourhood located directly north of the Downtown Commercial Core. The area, which was developed from reclaimed industrial land, fronts the Bow River and sits immediately north of 3rd Avenue South. North of Eau Claire is Prince's Island Park, a large urban park on an island in the Bow River and the site of many summer festivals, including the Calgary Folk Music Festival, Carifest, Shakespeare in the Park and various busking happenings. Within Eau Claire is a variety of pubs and restaurants. It is also located on the city's large network of pedestrian pathways and trails, along

== Demographics ==
As of the 2016 Canadian Census, the population of Downtown was about 38,663 people living on approximately 6.0 km^{2} (2.3 sq mi) of land. Also as of 2016, there were approximately 137,030 jobs in Downtown Calgary.

Residents in this community had a median household income of $30,126 in 2005 with 41.4% of the population reported as low income residents. As of 2006, 44.3% of the residents in the commercial core were immigrants. A proportion of 99.7% of the buildings were condominiums or apartments, and 95.9% of the housing was used for renting.

== Crime ==
In the May 2023-May 2024 data period, the Downtown Commercial Core had a crime rate of 12.705/100, a decrease from the previous data period.

This puts it at this comparison to other Calgary communities: Saddle Ridge (1.358/100), Whitehorn (1.741/100), Rundle (2.342/100), Brentwood (2.348/100), Acadia (2.542/100), Bowness (2.934/100), Shawnessy (3.296/100), Inglewood (3.438/100), Sunnyside (3.650/100), Marlborough (4.703/100), Southwood (5.147/100), Sunalta (5.307/100), Montgomery (5.483/100), Forest Lawn (6.528/100), Rosscarrock (7.049/100), Downtown Commercial Core (12.705/100), Downtown East Village (15.605/100), Manchester (43.368/100).

== See also ==
- List of neighbourhoods in Calgary
- List of attractions and landmarks in Calgary
- List of tallest buildings in Calgary
