= Danger Beneath the Sea =

- Written by: Lucian Truscott IV
- Directed by: Jon Cassar
- Starring: Casper Van Dien; Gerald McRaney; Tammy Isbell; Dominic Zamprogna; Kim Poirier
- Country of origin: United States
- Original language: English

Production
- Running time: 92 minutes

Original release
- Release: November 29, 2001

Danger Beneath the Sea is a 2001 American made-for-television action film directed by Jon Cassar, and starring Casper Van Dien.

== Plot ==
This is a nightmare scenario, true for many Cold War submarine veterans. After a North Korean nuclear missile test goes wrong, the American nuclear attack submarine USS Lansing is cut off from communications. Detecting radioactivity in the air and believing the world to be at nuclear war, the executive officer takes command of the ship from the captain and prepares to fire the submarine's nuclear missiles at targets in Russia. Some members of the crew do not believe they are at war and help the captain take back control of the ship. Meanwhile, a second American submarine is sent to hunt down and destroy the Lansing before it can start a real war.

In the end, the captain is successful in regaining control of the vessel and preventing the missile launch. After outmaneuvering the other submarine, the captain surfaces in a Russian harbor and uses a mobile phone (gained from a crewman who brought it on board during a stop-over in Tokyo) to contact an admiral and inform them that the situation is now under control.

== Cast ==
- Casper Van Dien as Commander Miles Sheffield
- Gerald McRaney as Admiral Eugene Justice
- Stewart Bick as Executive Officer Lieutenant Commander Albert Kenner
- Tammy Isbell as Lieutenant Clare Holliday
- Ron White as Chief Petty Officer Pete LeCroix
- Kim Poirier as Lisa Alford
- Vince Corazza as Lieutenant Commander Eric Watkins
- Paul Essiembre as Sonar Technician First Class Tony Martinez
- Dominic Zamprogna as Aviation Support Equipment Technician Ryan Alford
- Michael McLachlan as Lieutenant Sal Lombardi
- Jim Thorburn as Aviation Support Equipment Technician Matt Rockwell
- Justin Peroff as Lieutenant Howard Lowenstein
- Joel Gordon as Petty Officer Third Class Terry Peel
- Shane Daly as Lieutenant Commander Gary Reynolds
- Brad Austin as Petty Officer First Class Ross
- Russell Yuen as Lieutenant Neil Ryan
- Billy Parrott as Radioman Dunkel
- Toby Proctor as Seaman
