= Stephen Avenue =

- 8 Avenue S
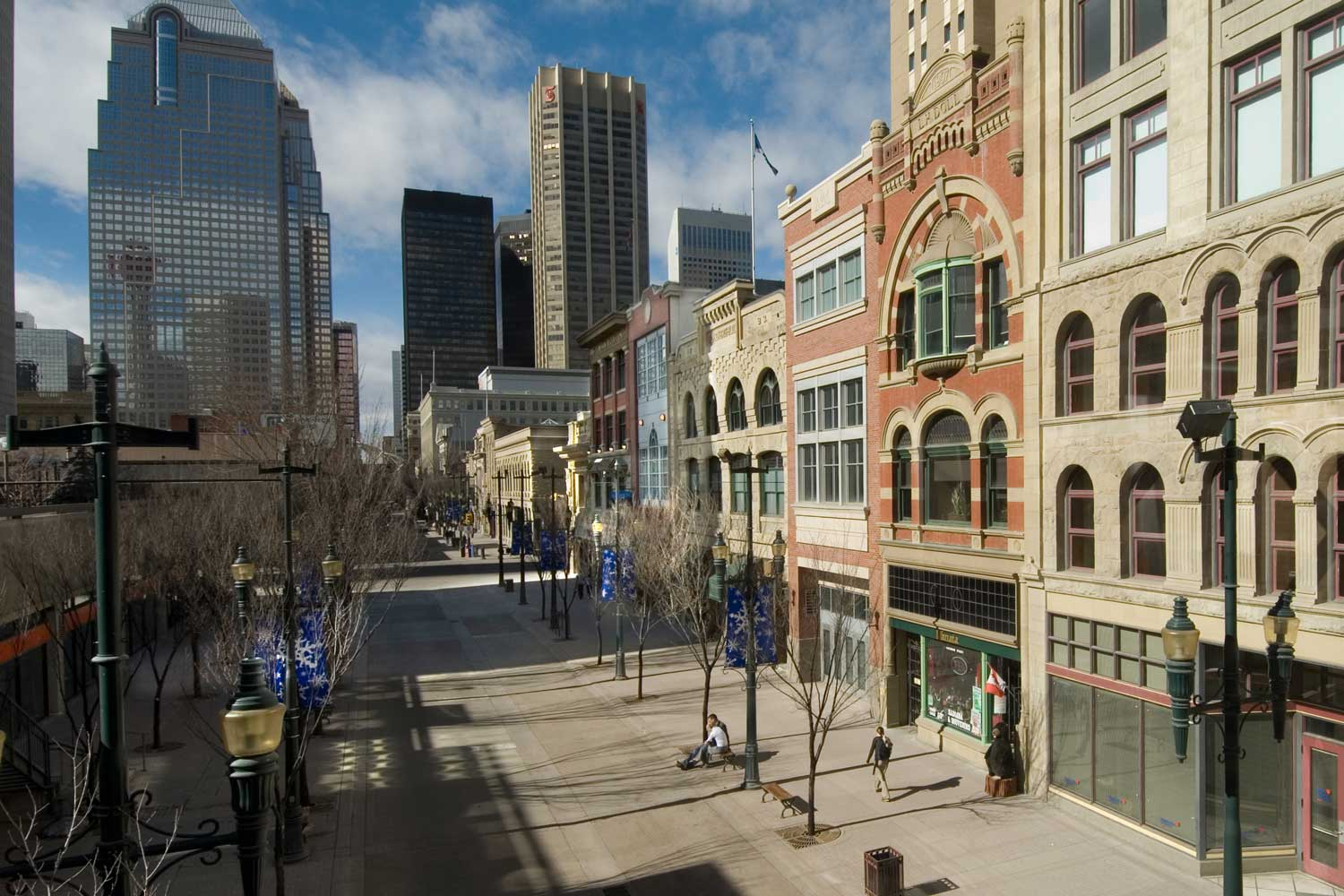
- Historic buildings on Stephen Avenue
- Interactive map of Stephen Avenue
- 51.0456°N 114.0630°W
- Type: Historic district
- Etymology: George Stephen
- Location: Downtown Calgary, Calgary, Alberta, Canada

History
- Built: Early 1900s (turned into a pedestrian street in 1970)

Site notes
- Governing body: Parks Canada

National Historic Site of Canada
- Designated: 2002

Stephen Avenue is a major pedestrian mall in downtown Calgary, Alberta, Canada. The mall is the portion of 8 Avenue SW between 4 Street SW and 1 Street SE. It is open to vehicles only from 6:00 p.m. to 6:00 a.m.

The street is known for some of Calgary's finest restaurants, cafés, pubs and bars. The street also provides an eclectic mix of boutiques and high-end retail. Major shopping centres include The Core Shopping Centre (formerly Calgary Eaton Centre/TD Square), Bankers Hall, Fashion Central, Scotia Centre, and The Bay department store.

The street is also home to downtown Calgary's major convention and exhibition facility, the Calgary Telus Convention Centre, and two hotels, the Hyatt Regency Calgary, which incorporates several historic buildings into its facade, and the Calgary Marriott.

== History ==
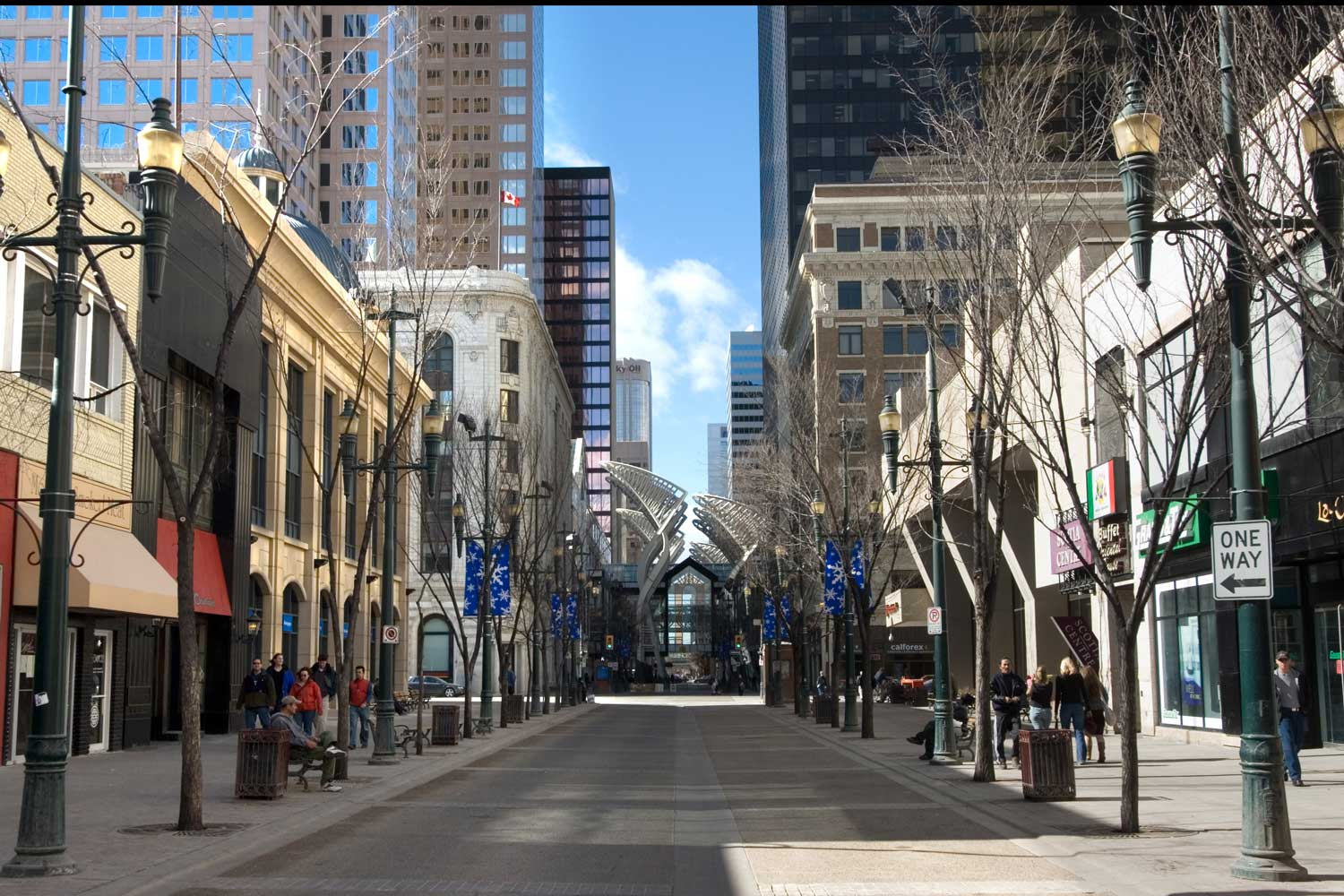
Street level view of Stephen Avenue. The street was named after George Stephen, 1st Baron Mount Stephen.

The street was named after George Stephen, 1st Baron Mount Stephen, the first president of the Canadian Pacific Railway. Stephen Avenue contains a high concentration of registered historic buildings and the street itself was declared a Canadian historic site in 2002. Many of these building are made of sandstone that was quarried locally from the Paskapoo Formation; a result of the construction of fire-resistant buildings following a fire in 1886 that damaged many of the city's earlier wooden structures.

The law firm of Lougheed & Bennett was located on the second floor of the Clarence Block building. R.B. Bennett was a partner in the firm, who later served as Prime Minister of Canada.

The Hartt Shoe Company operated a retail store on the ground floor of the Clarence Block building, through a partnership with MacMurray's LTD. from 1920 to 1931.

== In popular culture ==
Netflix series Can This Love Be Translated? which follows the romance between interpreter Joo Ho-jin and actress Cha Mu-hee, was filmed in the street in October 2024.
