= Tammy Isbell =

Canadian actress

- Born: 1968 (age 56–57); Farmington, New Mexico, U.S; Canada
- Occupation: Actress
- Years active: 1995–present
- Spouse: Peter Outerbridge (m. 2000)
- Children: 2

Tammy Isbell is a Canadian actress.

== Life and career ==
Isbell was born 1968 in Farmington, New Mexico, the daughter of Beverly Ann Thompson and Fred Allen Isbell. She was raised in New Mexico and Oklahoma, moving to Toronto in 1995 after her television debut starring in an episode of The Outer Limits titled "The New Breed". During the filming, Isbell met her husband, actor Peter Outerbridge. She later made her film debut starring in Joe's Wedding (1996) and later appeared in feature and made-for-television films such as Elvis Meets Nixon (1997), Finding Graceland (1998), Escape from Mars (1999), Waydowntown (2000), Love and Murder (2000), And Never Let Her Go (2001), Danger Beneath the Sea (2001), Salem Witch Trials (2002) and America's Prince: The John F. Kennedy Jr. Story (2003).

From 2001 to 2008, Isbell starred in the Showcase soap opera, Paradise Falls, for which she was nominated for a Canadian Screen Award for Best Actress in a Continuing Leading Dramatic Role. She made guest-starring appearances on both Canadian an American television series such as The Eleventh Hour, Murdoch Mysteries, ReGenesis, Republic of Doyle, Flashpoint, Nikita, Suits, Rookie Blue, Saving Hope, Rogue, Designated Survivor and Anne. Isbell had the recurring roles on 1-800-Missing, Heartland, Burden of Truth and Ride. From 2009 to 2011, Isbell was regular cast member in the Family Channel sitcom Overruled! and in 2015 co-starred in the second season of Space horror series, Bitten. She also appeared in films Sharpay's Fabulous Adventure (2012), Big News from Grand Rock (2014), and the miniseries Five Days at Memorial (2022).

In 2024, Isbell was cast in the Citytv police drama series, Law & Order Toronto: Criminal Intent playing Detective Alice Riley, as well as appearing in the comedy web series My Dead Mom.
