= Sun Life Plaza =

The Ampersand
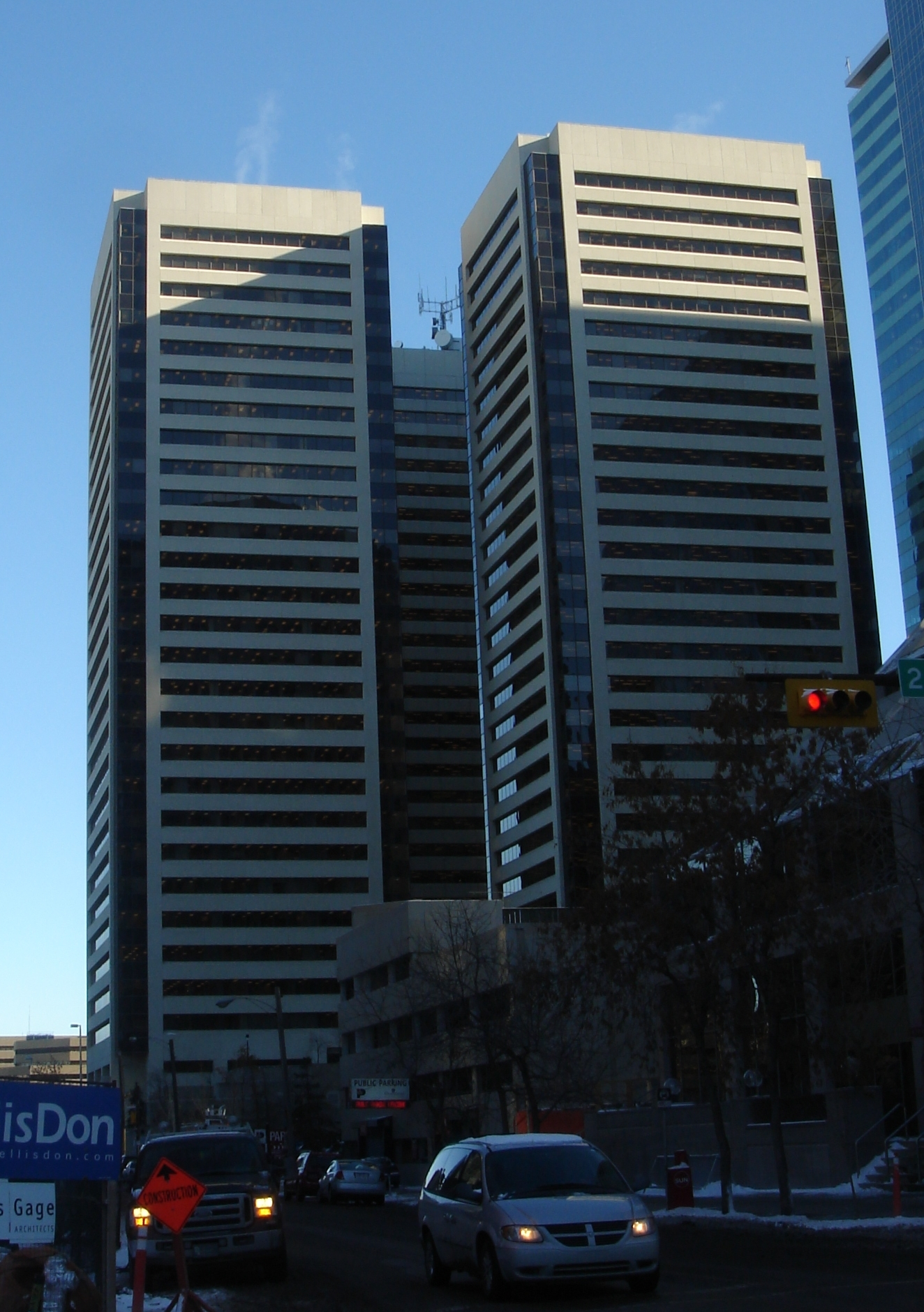
- The three towers of The Ampersand
- Interactive map of the The Ampersand area

General information
- Type: Office
- Location: Calgary; Canada
- Coordinates: 51°02′59″N 114°03′50″W
- Construction started: 1981
- Completed: 1984

Height
- Roof: 114.3 m (375 ft)

Technical details
- Floor count: 28

The Ampersand is a high-rise office complex in Calgary, Alberta, Canada. It consists of three identical skyscrapers, designated as North, West and East Tower, and connected by the lobby at ground level and by a shopping gallery at Plus 15 level.

Total area of the 3 buildings is 1.032 million square feet. Building floor plates are roughly 12,000 square feet each.

== Towers ==
The towers are 28 stories high, and rise to 114.3 m (375 ft). Sun Life Plaza - West was the first tower built, and was completed in 1981. Development continued with The Ampersand - North, completed in 1982, and was concluded in 1984 with Sun Life Plaza - East. Current occupants include the North West Redwater Partnership and Sproule.

Suncor Energy is a former tenant where it had headquarters in Tower III and occupied much of the building prior to its $43 billion merger with PetroCanada in 2009. With the merger, the combined entity chose the former PetroCanada Centre (now renamed the Suncor Energy Centre) in downtown Calgary to house the bigger company.

| Tower | Address | Floors | Height | Built |
|---|---|---|---|---|
| West | 144 4 Ave SW | 28 | 114.3 m (375 ft) | 1981 |
| North | 140 4 Ave SW | 28 | 114.3 m (375 ft) | 1982 |
| East | 112 4 Ave SW | 28 | 114.3 m (375 ft) | 1984 |

== See also ==
- List of tallest buildings in Calgary
