= Centennial Place (Calgary) =

Building complex located in downtown Calgary, Alberta, Canada

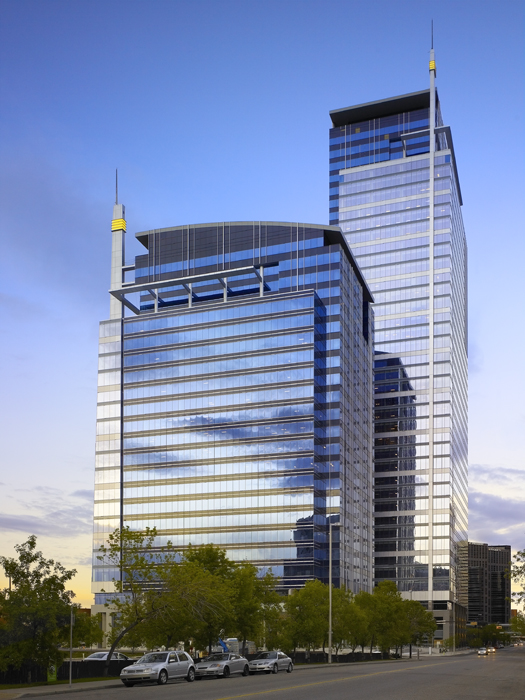
- Centennial Place seen from the west
- Interactive map of the Centennial Place area

General information
- Status: Completed 2010
- Type: office
- Location: Calgary
- Coordinates: 51°03′03″N 114°04′21″W
- Construction started: September 2006
- Opening: 2010
- Cost: CA$320-million
- Owner: Oxford Properties Group
- Management: Oxford Properties Group

Height
- Antenna spire: 182.6 m (599 ft) (Centennial place I); 117.6 m (386 ft) (Centennial place II)
- Roof: 165.2 m (542 ft) (Centennial place I); 100.1 m (328 ft) (Centennial place II)

Technical details
- Floor count: 39 (Centennial place I); 23 (Centennial place II)
- Floor area: 1,400,000 sq ft (130,000 m^{2})

Design and construction
- Architects: WZMH Architects & Gibbs Gage Architects
- Structural engineer: Read Jones Christoffersen

Centennial Place is a building complex located in downtown Calgary, Alberta, Canada, which includes a 39-storey 182.6 m (599 ft) and 23-storey 165.2 m (542 ft) office tower.

The complex was named to honour Alberta's Centennial year. The complex includes an underground five-level parkade with 793 stalls. The office space covers 1,200,000 sq ft (110,000 m^{2}). Construction of Centennial Place started in 2006 and was completed in 2010 at a cost of $320-million ($451.02 million in 2025). The property's sustainability features include curtain wall technology, motion sensors on lighting controls, low-flow plumbing fixtures, a high-efficiency heating and cooling plant, and a green roof with 30% of its surface planted. In 2010, the complex was certified LEED Gold for Core and Shell Development and LEED Platinum for Existing Buildings: Operations and Maintenance. The buildings are owned and operated Oxford Properties.

The roof of the 39-floor east tower rises to a height of 165.2 m (542 ft), with the spire reaching a height of 182.6 m (599 ft). The roof of the 23-floor west tower rises to a height of 100.1 m (328 ft), with a spire that is 117.6 m (386 ft) tall. As of 2020, Centennial Place I is listed by the Council on Tall Buildings and Urban Habitat as the 8th tallest building in Calgary, and 52nd tallest in Canada.

Centennial Place's tenants include Baytex Energy, Borden Ladner Gervais, and Vermilion Energy in the east tower; and Alberta Energy Regulator, Alberta Securities Commission, Arcis Corporation, and Crew Energy in the west tower.

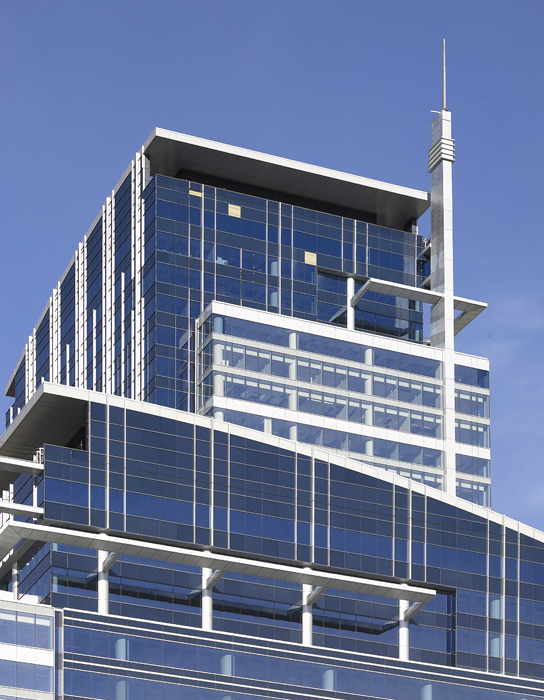
Centennial Place Roof

== See also ==
- List of tallest buildings in Calgary
