= Crew Energy =

Crew Energy Inc.
- Type: Public
- Traded as: TSX: CR
- Industry: Light Oil, NGL's
- Founded: 2003
- Headquarters: Calgary, AB
- Key people: John A.Brussa chair Dale O.Shwed pres, ceo, dir
- Products: light oil, liquids rich natural gas
- Number of employees: ~90 Jan 2022
- Subsidiaries: Crew Resources
- Website: www.crewenergy.com

Crew Energy Inc. is a growth-oriented, liquids-rich natural gas producer, committed to pursuing sustainable per share growth through a balanced mix of financially responsible exploration and development complemented by strategic acquisitions. The Company’s operations are exclusively focused in the vast Montney resource, situated in northeast British Columbia, and include a large contiguous land base. Crew operates in the liquids-rich natural gas areas of Septimus and West Septimus ("Greater Septimus") and Groundbirch in British Columbia. The Company has access to diversified markets with operated infrastructure and access to multiple pipeline egress options. Crew’s common shares are listed for trading on the Toronto Stock Exchange under the symbol “CR”.

== History ==
Crew Energy was incorporated May 12, 2003 a month before it changed its name to Crew Energy Inc. (June 27).

On April 1, 2010 it sold Edson Production (oil and gas in West Central Alberta) for Cdn$126 million.

On May 2, 2011 Crew Energy paid $622 million in stock and assumed debt for privately held Caltex, a heavy oil and natural gas liquids company. Caltex owns deposits of heavy oil in Lloydminster, Saskatchewan and natural gas liquids in Wapiti, Alberta.

In 2014, Crew completed three separate transactions that resulted in the acquisition of additional strategic Montney liquids-rich natural gas properties (115 net sections of land) in northeast British Columbia for approximately $122.1 million.

In July 2015, the Corporation completed a petroleum and natural gas rights exchange with the province of British Columbia, adding 53 net sections of new Montney land contiguous to the Corporation’s Groundbirch property in exchange for surrendering 66 net sections of undeveloped land that had been subject to restricted development since 2004.

During the second quarter of 2017 Crew completed the disposition of 18,400 net acres of undeveloped Montney land in the Goose area of northeast British Columbia for $49 million. The assets disposed of included no production or assigned reserves.

In 2020, Crew closed a two phase strategic transaction with a third party midstream company for the disposition of a 22% net working interest in each of its Septimus gas processing facility and West Septimus gas processing facility located in northeast British Columbia for aggregate consideration of $70.0 million.

In 2021, Crew Energy completed the sale of its Lloydminster heavy crude oil operations, successfully accomplishing their corporate evolution into a pure play Montney producer.

== Operations ==
Crew Energy’s focus is solely on the development of their World Class Montney Resource, which offers significant long-term potential to grow production, reserves and cash flow.

Crew’s Montney area assets include Septimus / West Septimus, Tower, Groundbirch, Attachie, Oak/Flatrock and Portage and are situated in northeast British Columbia. Their operations include liquids rich natural gas and light oil production from the siltstone Montney formation. At up to 300 metres thick, the Montney is developed with long-reach horizontal wells, completed with water-based fracture stimulations.

Crew holds a large, contiguous land base of over 264,000 net acres (>225,000 net undeveloped acres) in the Montney with condensate, light oil, liquids-rich natural gas & dry gas, and only 19% of Crew’s Upper Montney lands and less than 1% of Crew’s Lower Montney lands have been assigned reserves to the end of 2020.
