= The Core (shopping centre) =

Shopping mall in Calgary, Alberta, Canada

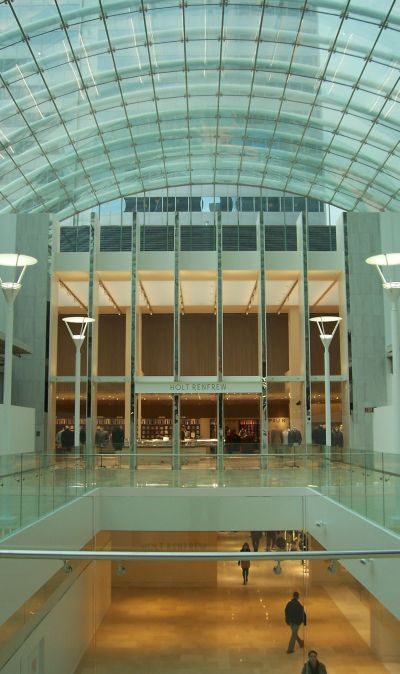
- The skylight at The Core
- Coordinates: 51°02′48″N 114°04′07″W
- Address: 324 8th Avenue SW, Calgary, Alberta, Canada
- Opened: 1977, 1990
- Manager: Cushman & Wakefield
- Owner: Ivanhoé Cambridge (50%); AIMCo
- Num. of stores: 160
- Num. of anchor tenants: 4
- Floor area: 62,080 m^{2} (668,200 sq ft)
- Floors: 4
- Parking: 600
- Public transit: 4 Street SW station 3 Street SW station
- Website: www.coreshopping.ca

The Core (stylized The CORE Shopping Centre), which consists of TD Square, the Holt Renfrew building, the Lancaster building (Simons), the Stephen Avenue Place shops, Scotia Centre, and the former Calgary Eaton Centre, is the dominant shopping complex located in the downtown core of Calgary, Alberta, Canada. It spans three city blocks and contains approximately 160 retailers on four levels. The property also contains six major office towers (TD Canada Trust Tower, TD Square Home Oil and Dome Towers, and the historic Lancaster Building. It is the hub of downtown Calgary's +15 skywalk system, and as such is the busiest shopping centre in the city by pedestrian count, with around 250,000 visitors passing through each week. The centre's architectural focal point is a vast suspended glass skylight which spans the length of the complex. As of October 29, 2010, the Core offers free evening and weekend parking at its underground lots.

The Core is bounded by 8th Avenue SW (Stephen Avenue pedestrian mall) on the south, 7th Avenue SW (LRT Corridor rapid transit line) on the north, and extends above 3rd Street SW (Barclay Parade) and 4th Street SW. The mall is directly connected to the neighbouring retail companies of Bankers Hall (south), Eighth Avenue Place (south), Intact Place (north), Brookfield Place via Scotia Centre/Hudson's Bay Store (north), and Manulife Place (west) via the +15 skywalk system. It also contains the Devonian Gardens, a unique 2.5-acre (1.0 ha) glass-enclosed indoor botanical park, which reopened to the public on July 27, 2012, after a complete renovation.

== History ==
The T. Eaton Co. opened its original Calgary department store on the site in 1929. In 1977, it was joined by TD Square (originally named Oxford Square) to the east. TD Square, an office and shopping complex, covered four levels over an entire block and contained the original Devonian Gardens indoor botanical garden. In 1990, Eaton's store was relocated into a new building one block west and a four-level shopping centre, the Calgary Eaton Centre, was built on its original site. Following the closure of the Eaton's chain in 2002, Sears acted as an anchor store until 2008 when it was closed to make way for Holt Renfrew's expansion. The combination of the two centres resulted in the property being rebranded "the Core", however the property is still referred to as "the Core – TD Square".

== Redevelopment ==
The centre underwent a three-year, multimillion-dollar redevelopment project, which was completed in 2011. The redevelopment unified the complex under a continuous 85-foot-wide (26 m), 656-foot-long (200 m) suspended glass skylight. The skylight, completed in November 2009, is the largest point-supported structural glass skylight in the world. It creates the feel of an outdoor streetscape on the third floor, which incorporates two-storey retail facades with exterior-grade materials. Heavy construction work forced numerous retailers to close or relocate during the renovation, most of which have renovated or expanded. The renovation also widened the concourses, replaced all interior finishes and facilities, expanded the food court and added a structural glass bridge on the fourth floor of the complex. It also added several 'living green walls' near the entrances to the Devonian Gardens space. In 2009, WestNet City Wi-Fi blanketed the centre with Wi-Fi.

== Luxury goods and apparel ==
A number of stores in the centre sell high-end luxury goods and apparel. Brooks Brothers contains the only Canadian locations for the 'Black Fleece' designer shop and 'Fleece' for children.

== Images ==
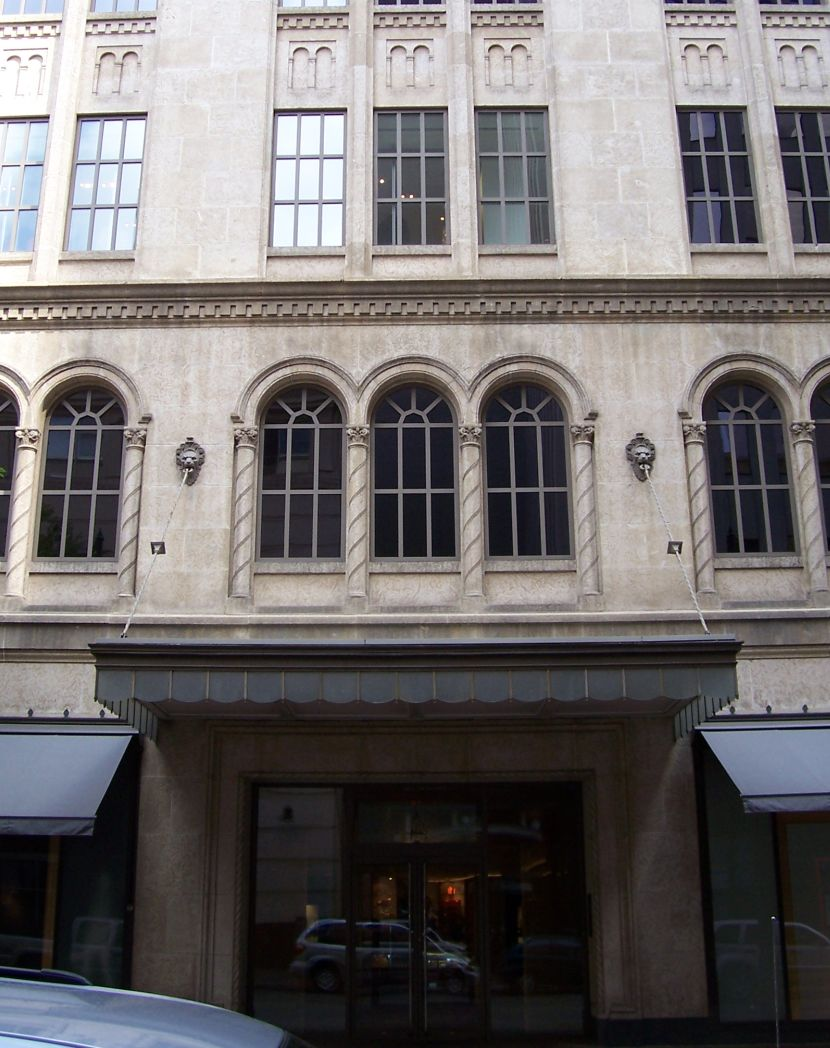
Historic Eaton's façade still remains

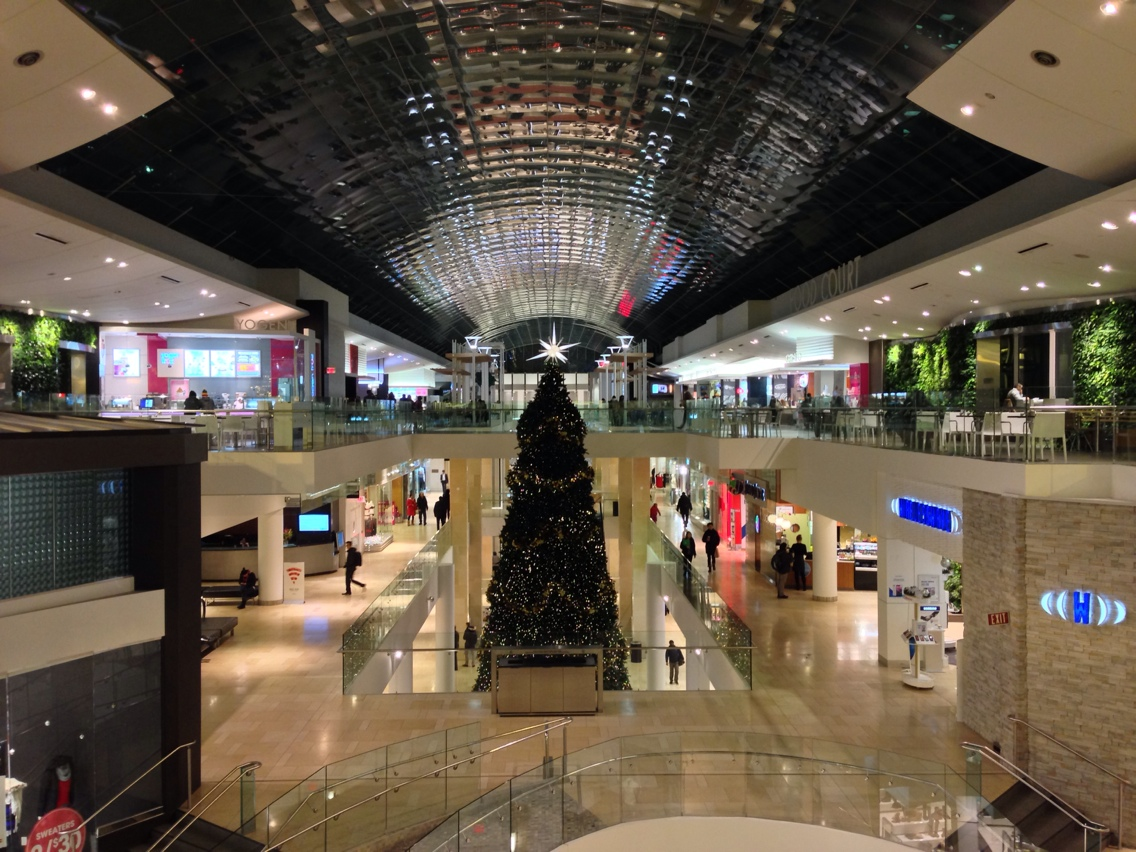
The main shopping area taken from the fourth floor, December 21, 2013

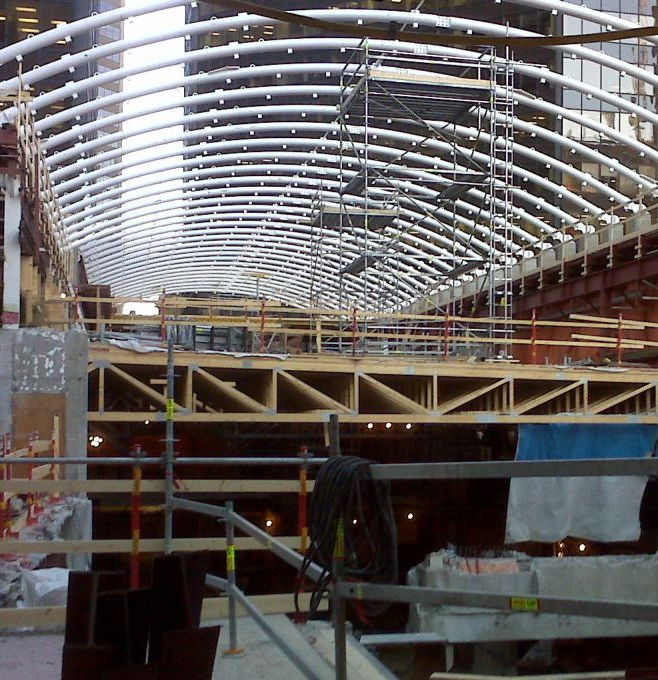
Installation of the new skylight

== See also ==
- List of shopping malls in Canada
