= TD Canada Trust Tower (Calgary) =

Office tower in Calgary, Alberta, Canada

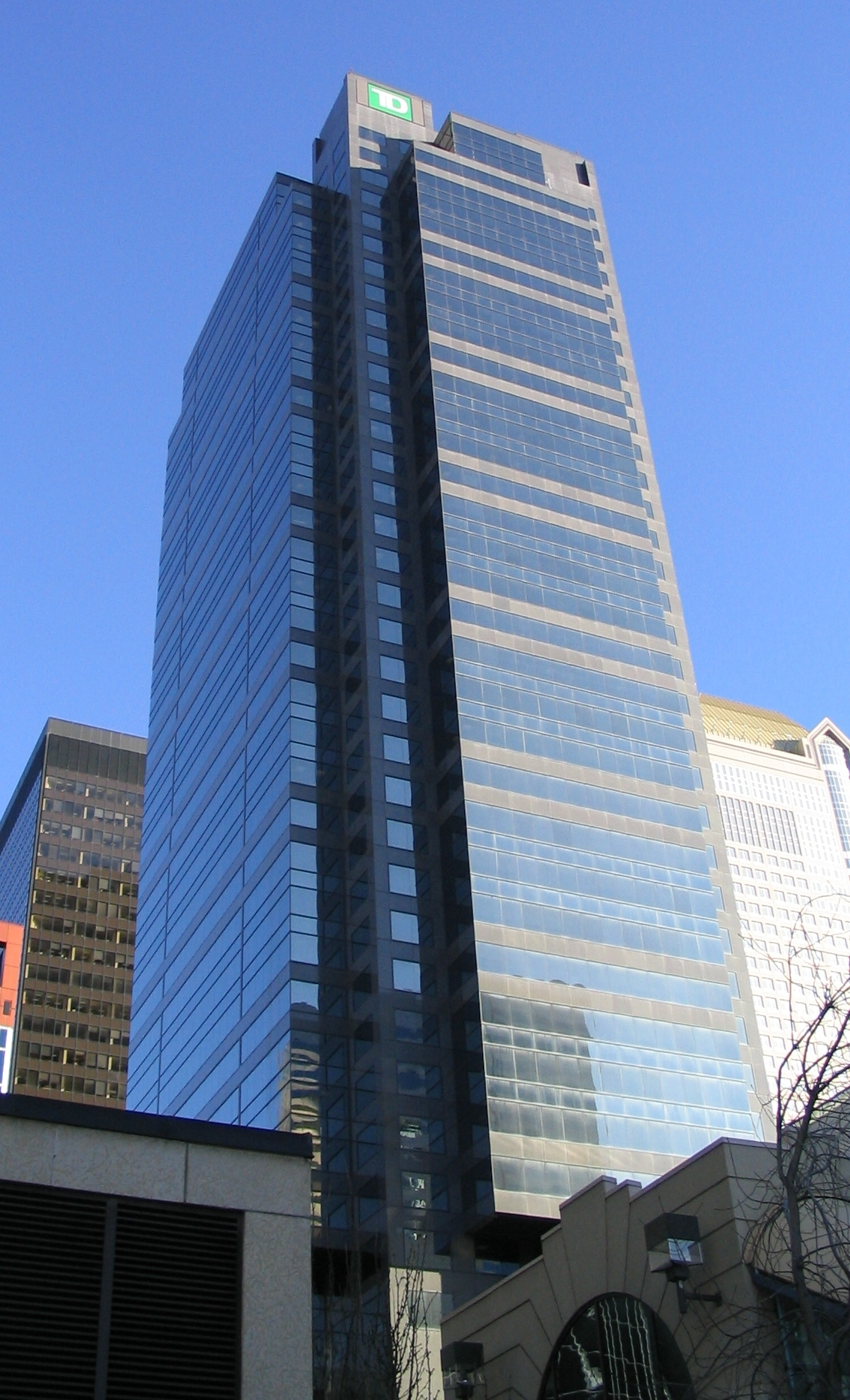
- Interactive map of the TD Canada Trust Tower area

General information
- Type: Office building
- Location: 421 7 Avenue SW; Calgary, Alberta, Canada
- Coordinates: 51°02′49″N 114°04′08″W
- Completed: 1991

Height
- Roof: 162 m (531 ft)

Technical details
- Floor count: 40 + 1 Penthouse
- Floor area: 65,000 m^{2} (700,000 sq ft)
- Lifts/elevators: 15

Design and construction
- Architect: WZMH Architects

TD Canada Trust Tower, formerly known as Eaton Centre Tower, is a 162 m (531 ft) office tower in Calgary, Alberta, Canada.

== Building information ==
The 41-storey TD Canada Trust Tower is located at 421 7th Avenue SW, and sits above a four-level retail podium (The Core Shopping Centre). TD Canada Trust Tower was designed by WZMH Architects in the postmodern style and was built by PCL Construction in 1991. It has a total area of 65,000 m^{2} (700,000 sq ft) and is serviced by 15 elevators. The building is managed by 20 VIC Properties.

In addition to TD Canada Trust, the tower is home to:

- TD Securities
- Macquarie Group
- Apache Corporation
- McCarthy Tetrault

The site was once the Eaton's Calgary flagship store (1929 to 1980s). Some of the store's original walls have been retained and incorporated into the facade of The Core's retail podium.

As of 2020, the TD Canada Trust Tower is listed by the Council on Tall Buildings and Urban Habitat as the 15th tallest building in Calgary and 82nd tallest building in Canada.

== Gallery ==
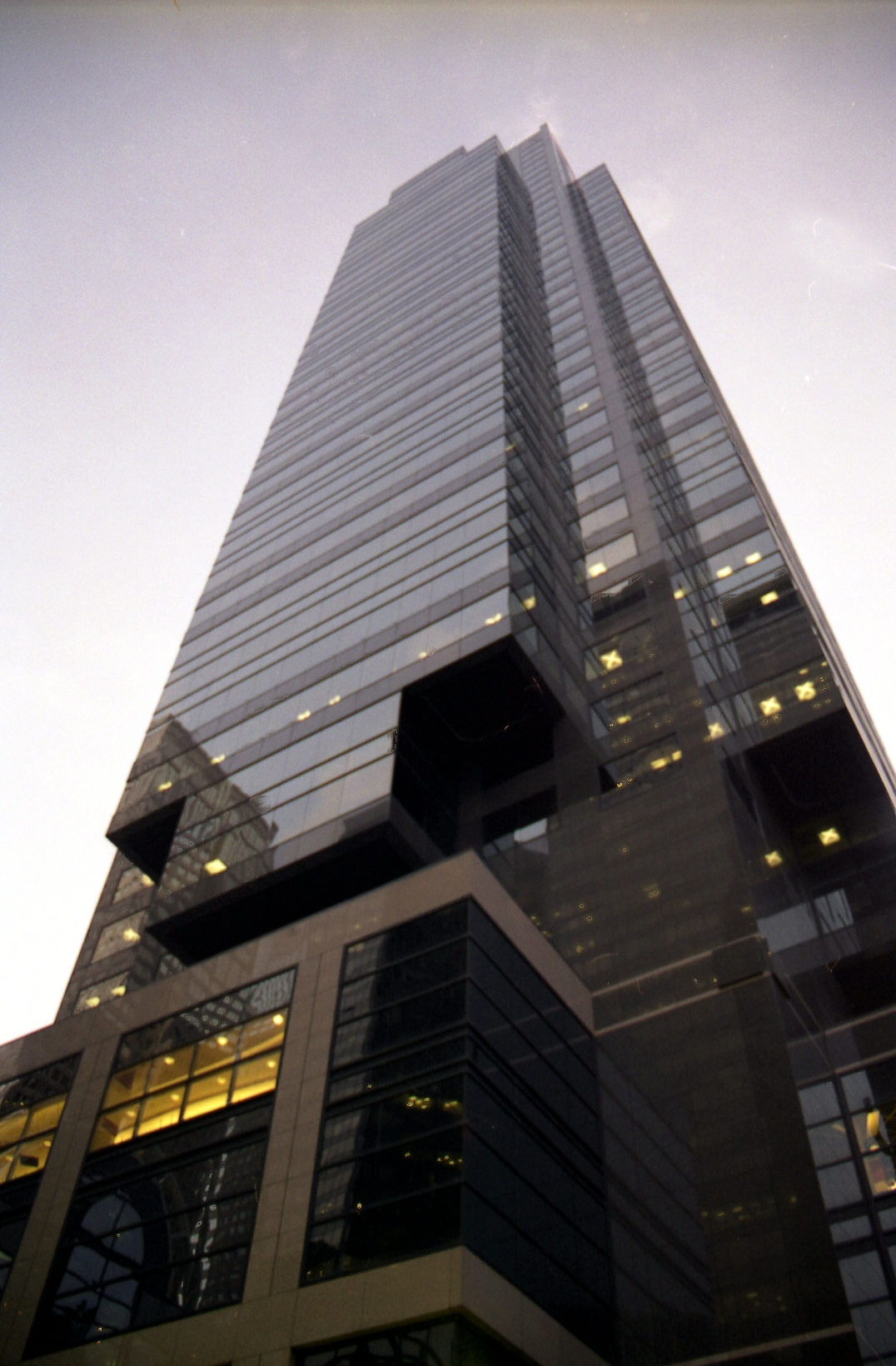

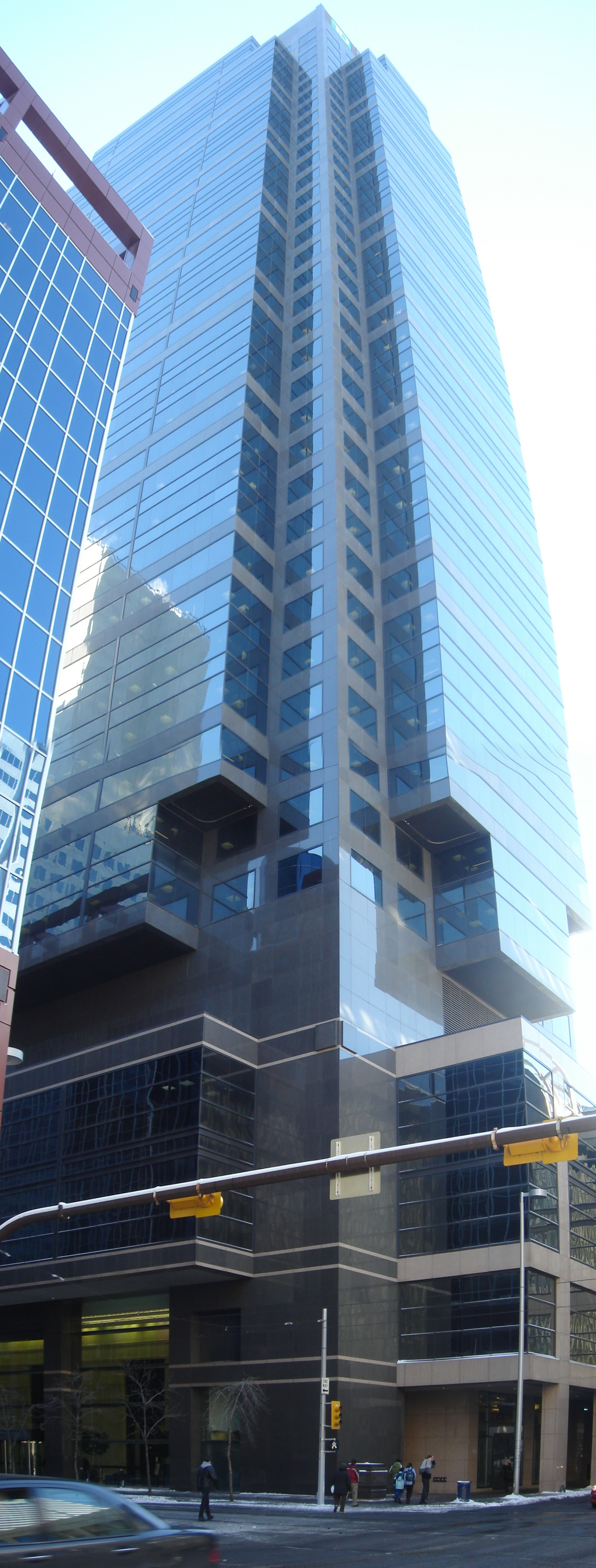

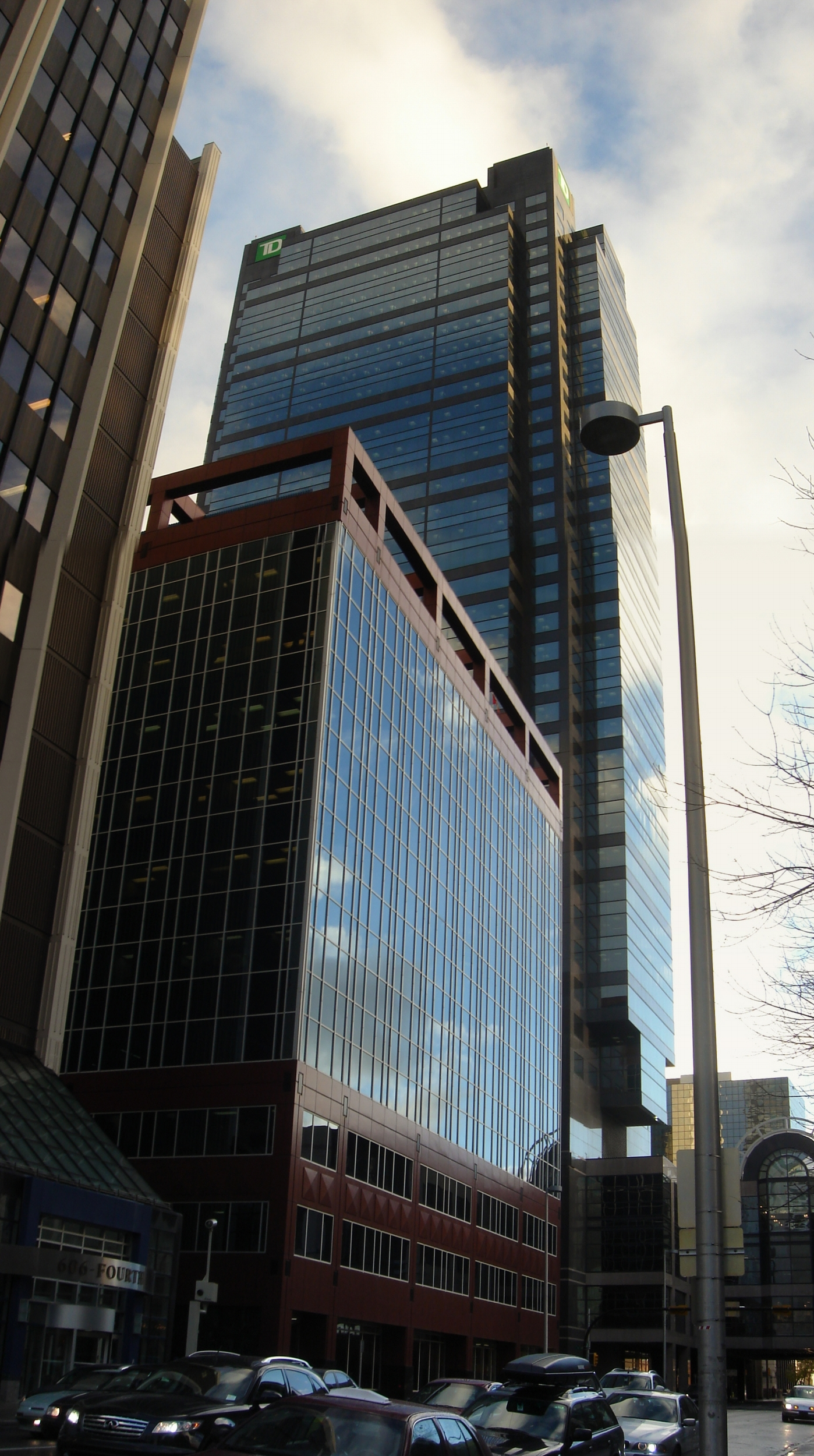

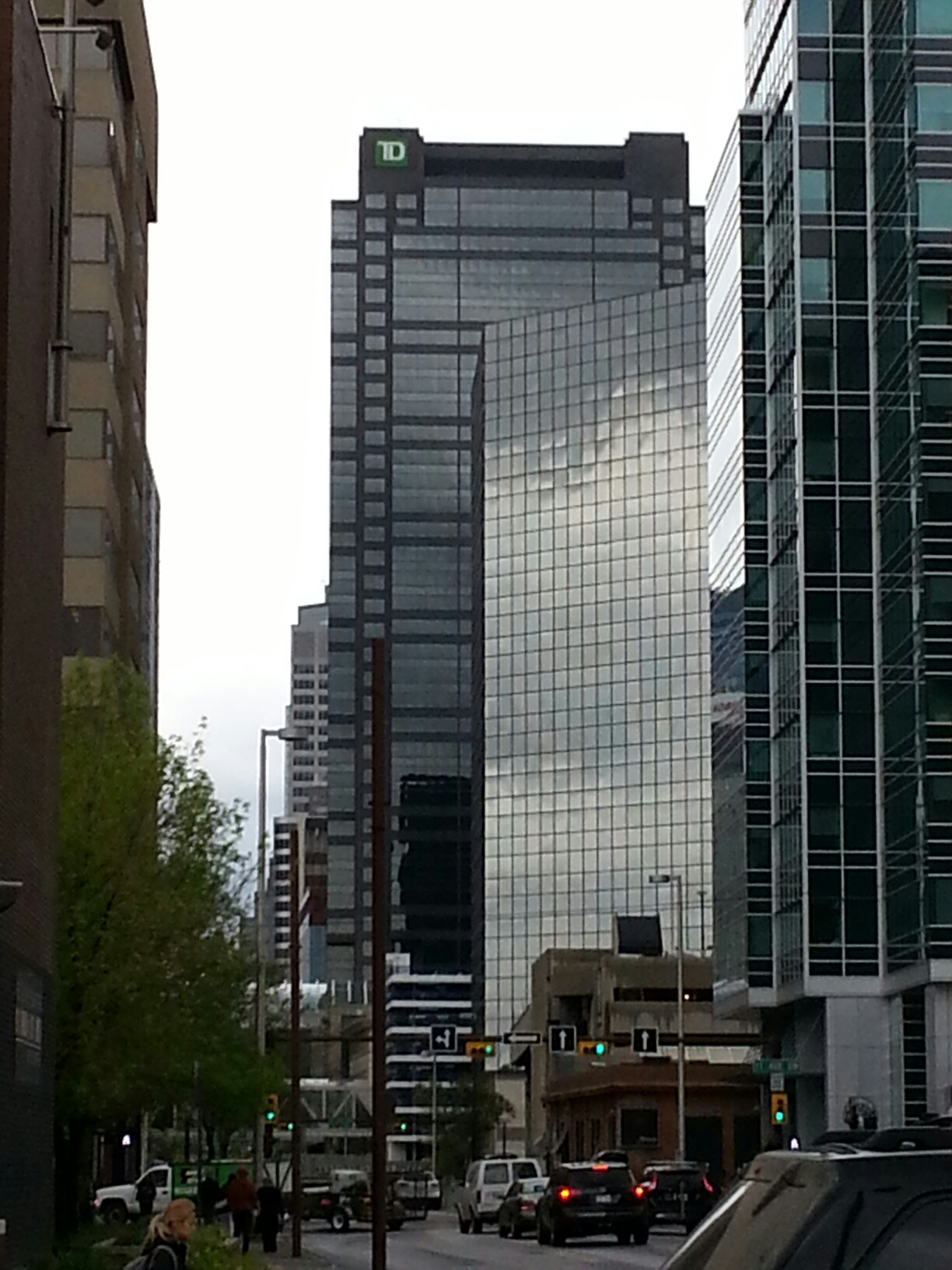

== See also ==
- List of tallest buildings in Calgary
