= Toronto-Dominion Square =

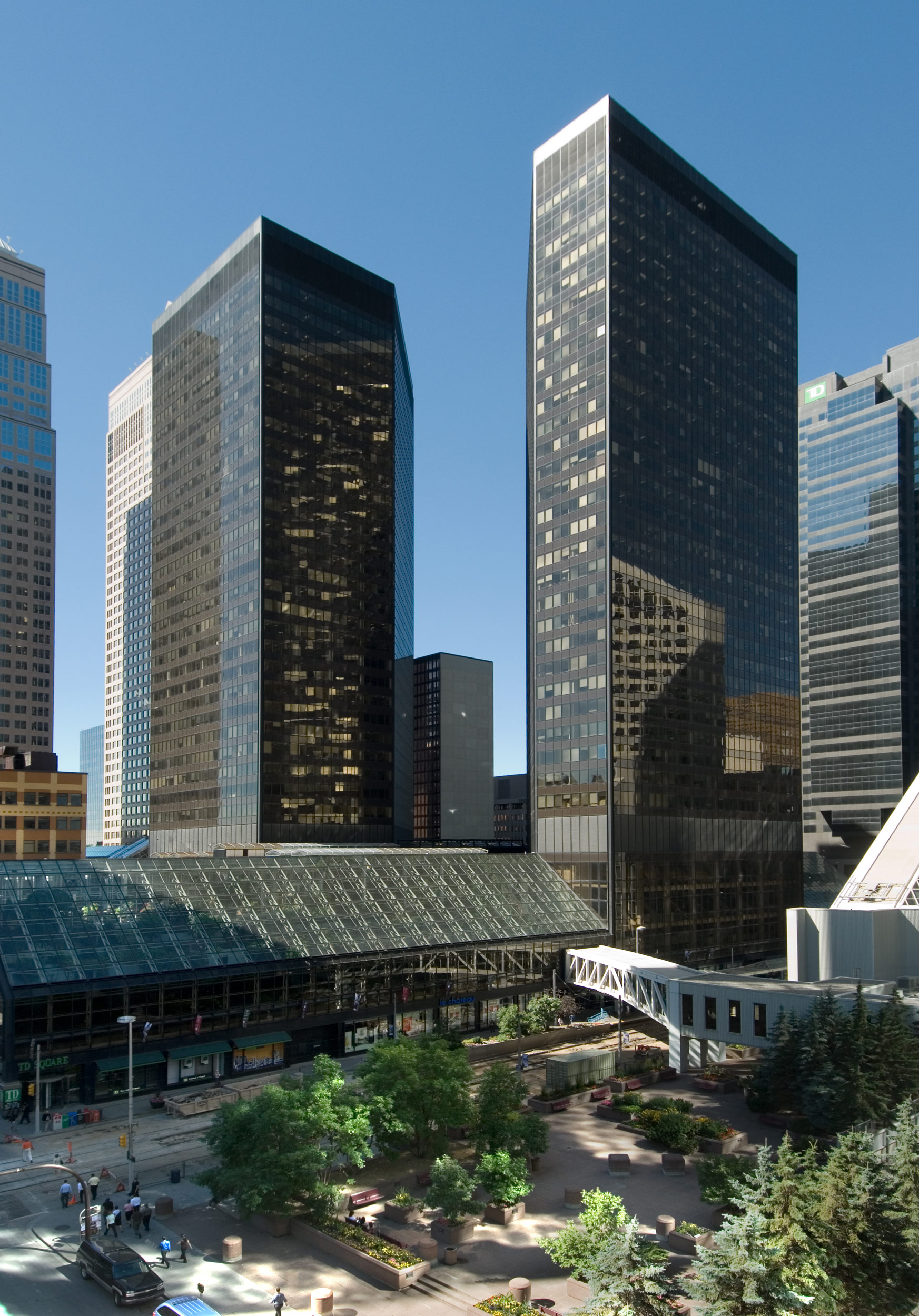
- The Home Oil (left) and Dome Tower (right)
- Interactive map of the Toronto-Dominion Square area

General information
- Type: Office
- Location: Calgary, Alberta, Canada
- Coordinates: 51°02′47″N 114°04′10″W
- Completed: 1977
- Management: Cushman and Wakefield

Height
- Roof: 141 m (463 ft)

Technical details
- Floor count: 35

Design and construction
- Architect: Skidmore, Owings & Merrill
- Main contractor: PCL Construction

Toronto-Dominion Square, originally Oxford Square, is a full-block building complex in Calgary, Alberta built by Oxford Developments. The project was designed by Skidmore, Owings & Merrill of New York, with J. H. Cook and Associates as the architect of record. It is located on the block between 7 and 8 Avenues South and 2 and 3 Streets West. The structure consists of a five-storey base with two 35-storey towers. The south tower is named for the Home Oil Company and the north tower is named for Dome Petroleum. In 1980, SOM replicated the design concept in its Town Square in Saint Paul, Minnesota.

The tower has a height of 141 m (463 ft) and holds 35 floors. Designed by CPV Group Architects and Engineers Ltd in late modernist style, it was built by PCL Construction and was completed in 1977. The building is managed by Cushman and Wakefield.

== Devonian Gardens ==
The podium of Toronto-Dominion Square contains the Devonian Gardens, an indoor botanical park occupying the top level of the retail space. The gardens, maintained by the City of Calgary, opened in 1977 and have undergone multiple renovations, including a major overhaul completed in 2012.
