= Bankers Hall =

Building complex located in downtown Calgary, Alberta

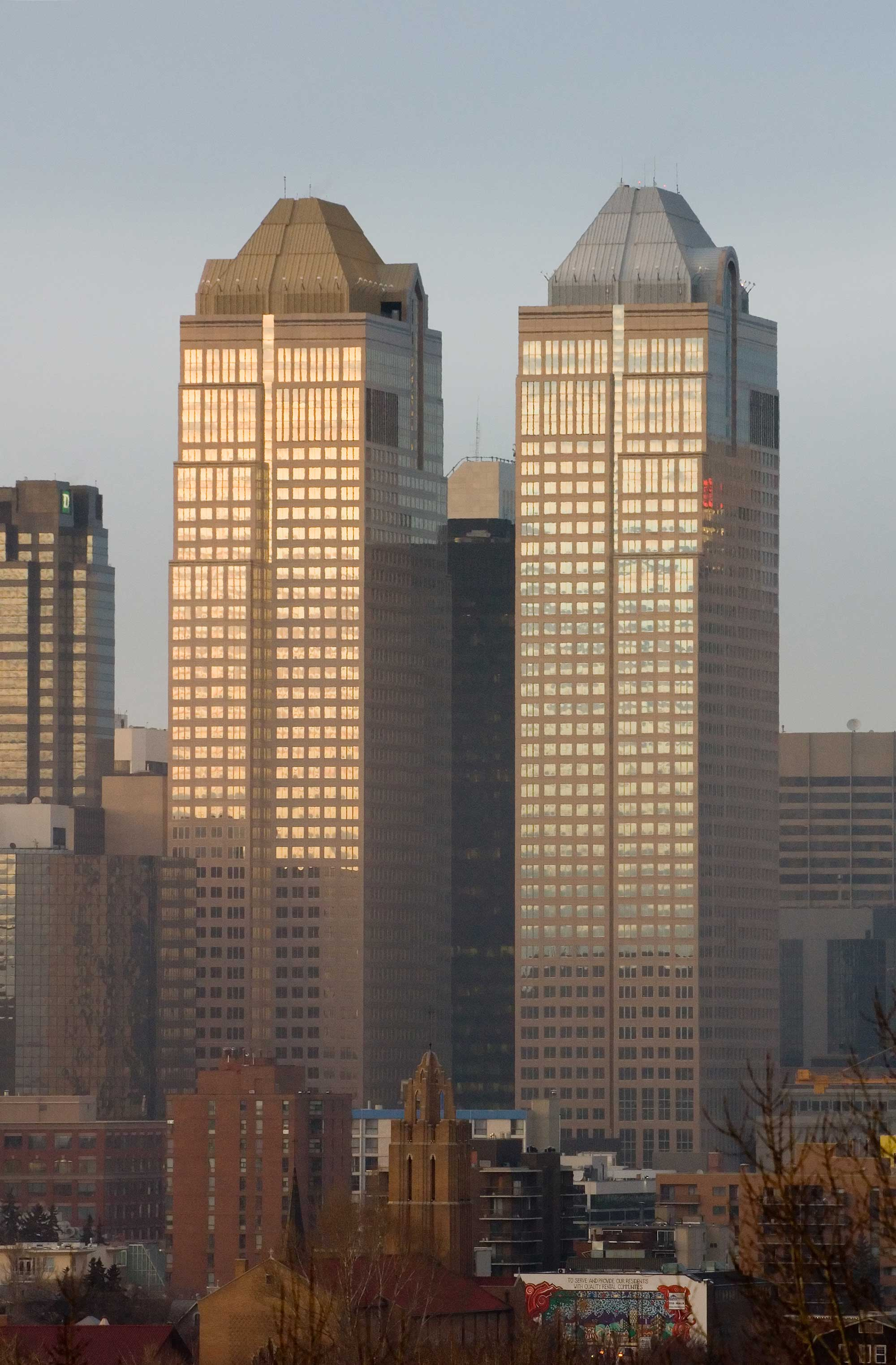
- Bankers Hall twin buildings
- Interactive map of the Bankers Hall area

General information
- Type: Office, Commercial
- Coordinates: 51°02′43.4″N 114°04′09.6″W
- Completed: 2000
- Cost: $225 million CAD
- Owner: Brookfield Properties

Height
- Roof: 197 m (646 ft)

Technical details
- Floor count: 52

Design and construction
- Architect: Design Dialog - formerly known as Cohos Evamy
- Structural engineer: Jablonsky, Ast and Partners

Bankers Hall is a building complex located in downtown Calgary, Alberta, which includes twin 52-storey office towers (197 metres high), designed by the architectural firm Cohos Evamy in postmodern architectural style.

The first building, known as Bankers Hall East, is located at 855 2nd Street SW and was completed in 1989. It was followed in 2000 by Bankers Hall West, at 888 3rd Street SW. After its completion, they became the tallest twin buildings in Canada.

Both buildings contain four-level podiums with an upscale retail gallery connected to the Plus 15 skywalk network. The Core Shopping Centre, the largest shopping complex in downtown Calgary, is directly connected via Plus 15. The northeast corner of the complex incorporates the historic Hollinsworth Building, whose intricate terra cotta facade has been fully restored.

The distinctive crowns of the buildings are intended to resemble cowboy hats when viewed from afar; Bankers Hall West is topped by a gold roof structure while the East building's crown is in silver. A white cowboy hat has long been an iconic symbol of Calgary, being portrayed on the city's flag, and presented as gifts to foreign dignitaries by the civic government at "white hatting ceremonies".

The complex previously featured a fitness centre called Bankers Hall Club and, prior to that, a multiplex movie theater, however both facilities are now closed.

== Shopping Mall ==
The bottom 4 floors of the Bankers Hall complex feature a shopping mall of the same name, which has skywalk connecting it to the larger The CORE shopping centre to the north.

The shopping mall of Bankers Hall contains 222,000 square feet (20,600 m^{2}) of retail floor area.

== Major Tenant ==
Canadian Natural Resources Limited

== Gallery ==
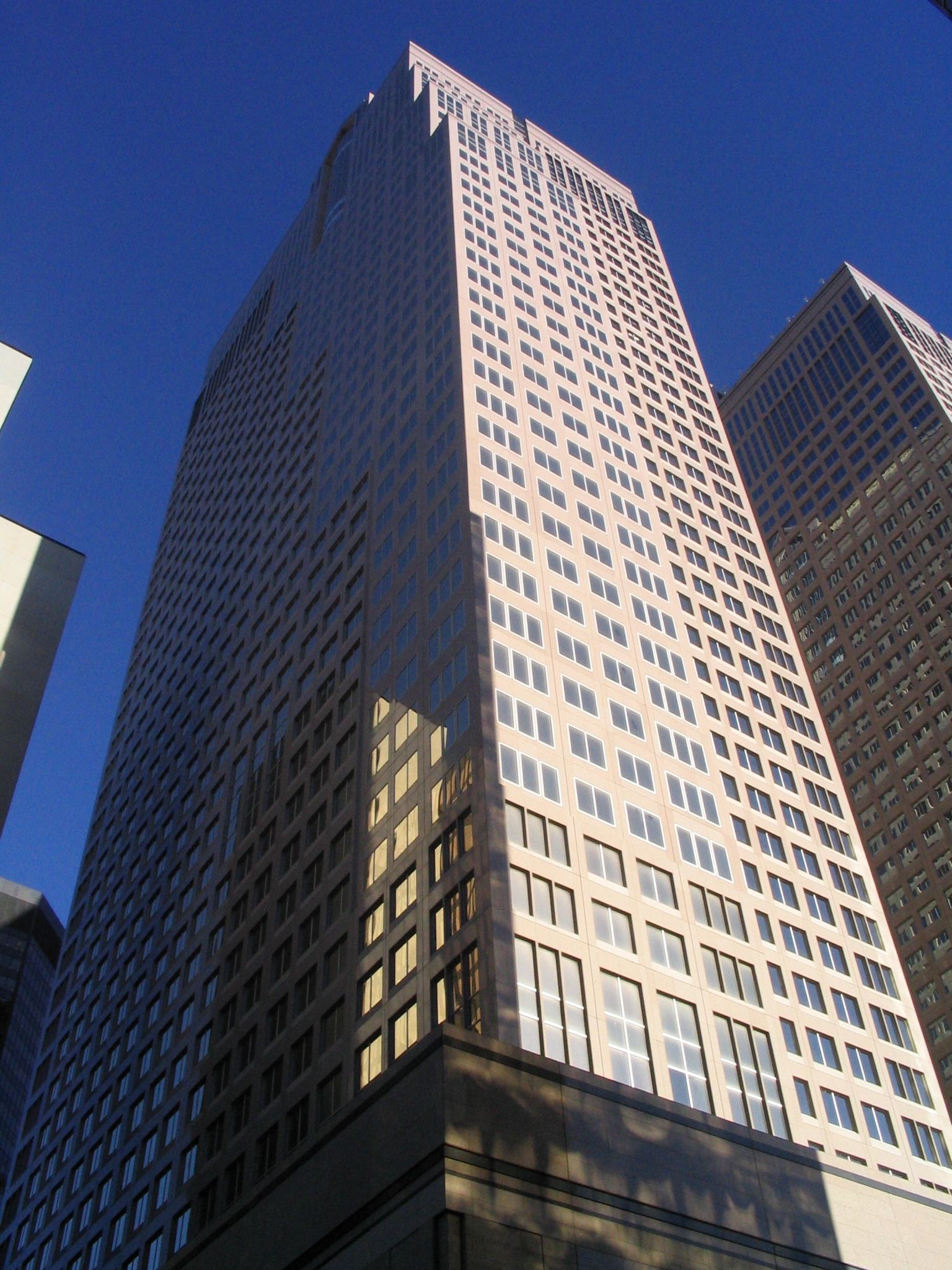
Bankers Hall West

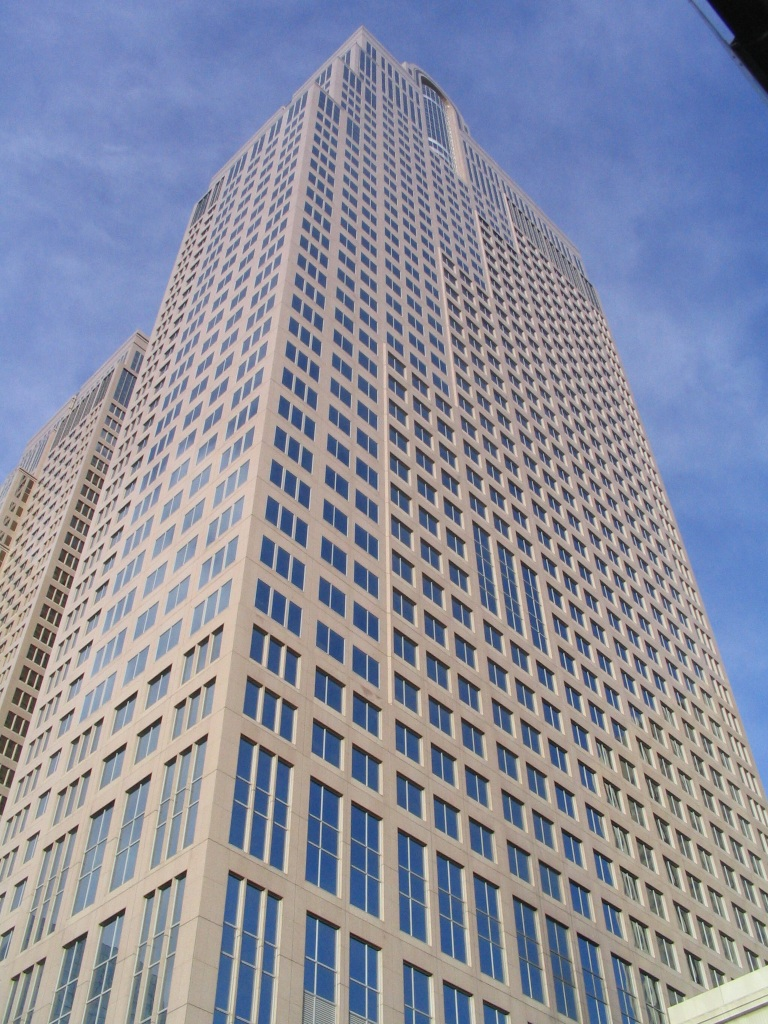
Bankers Hall East

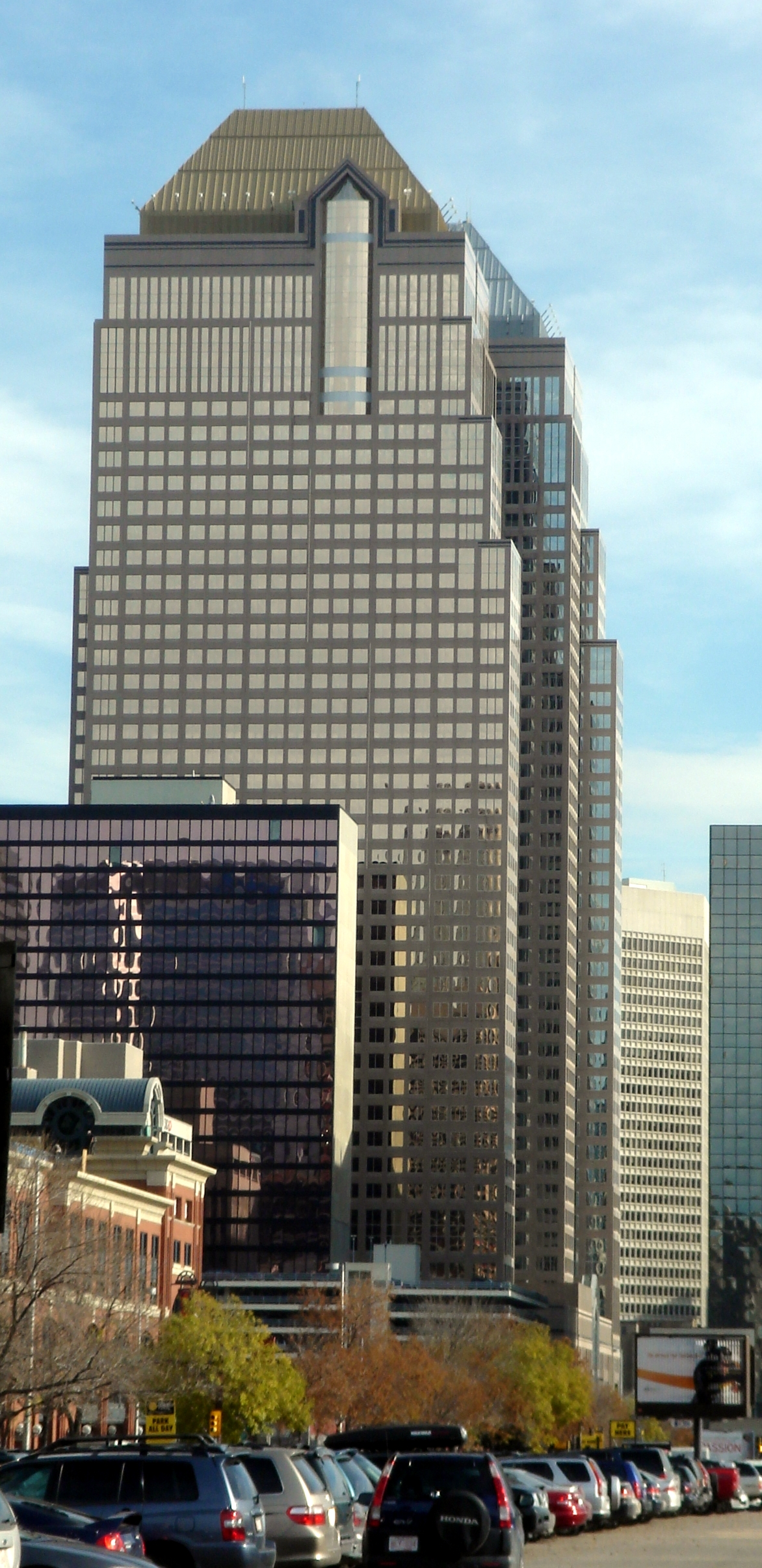
Bankers Hall West

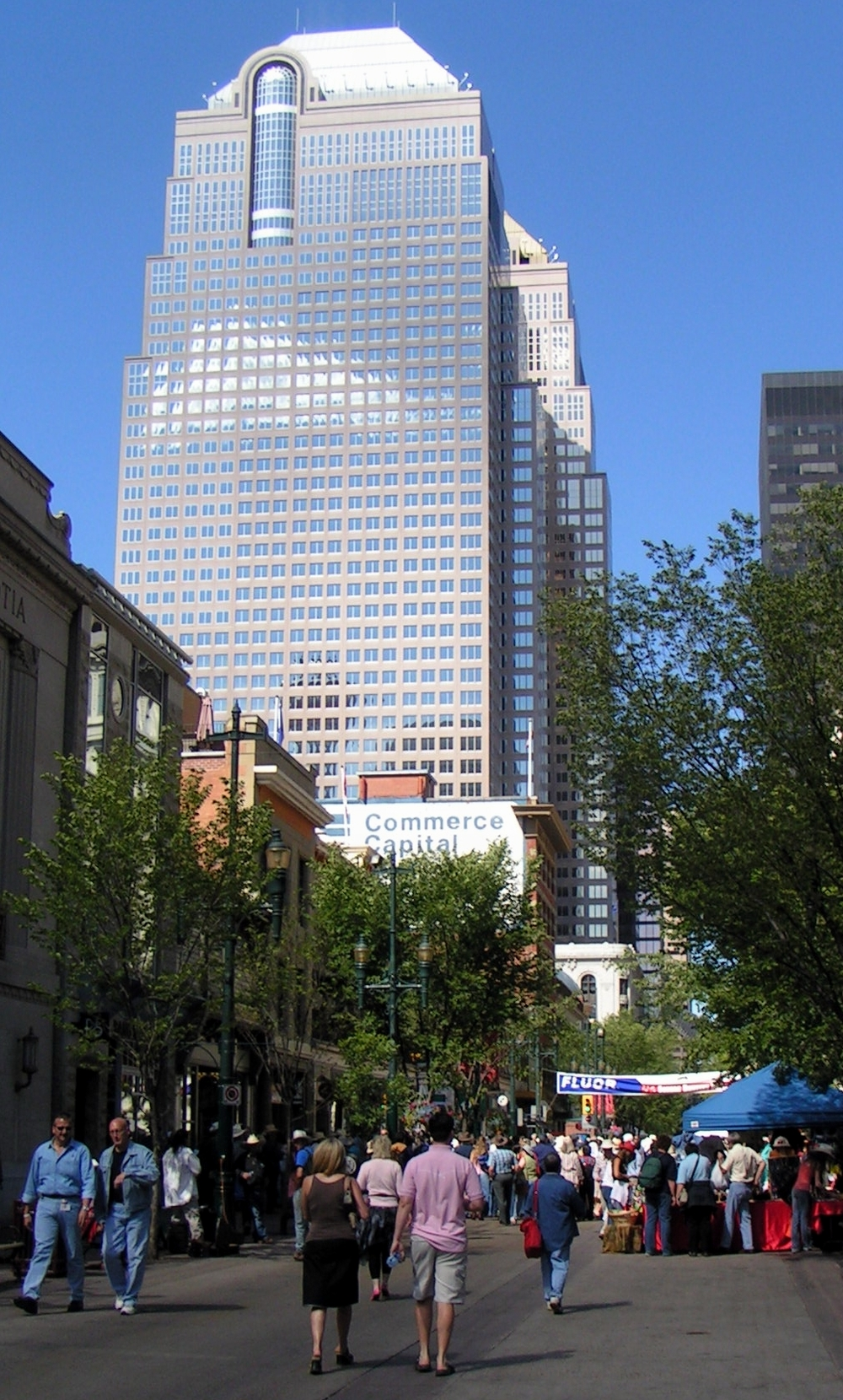
Bankers Hall East

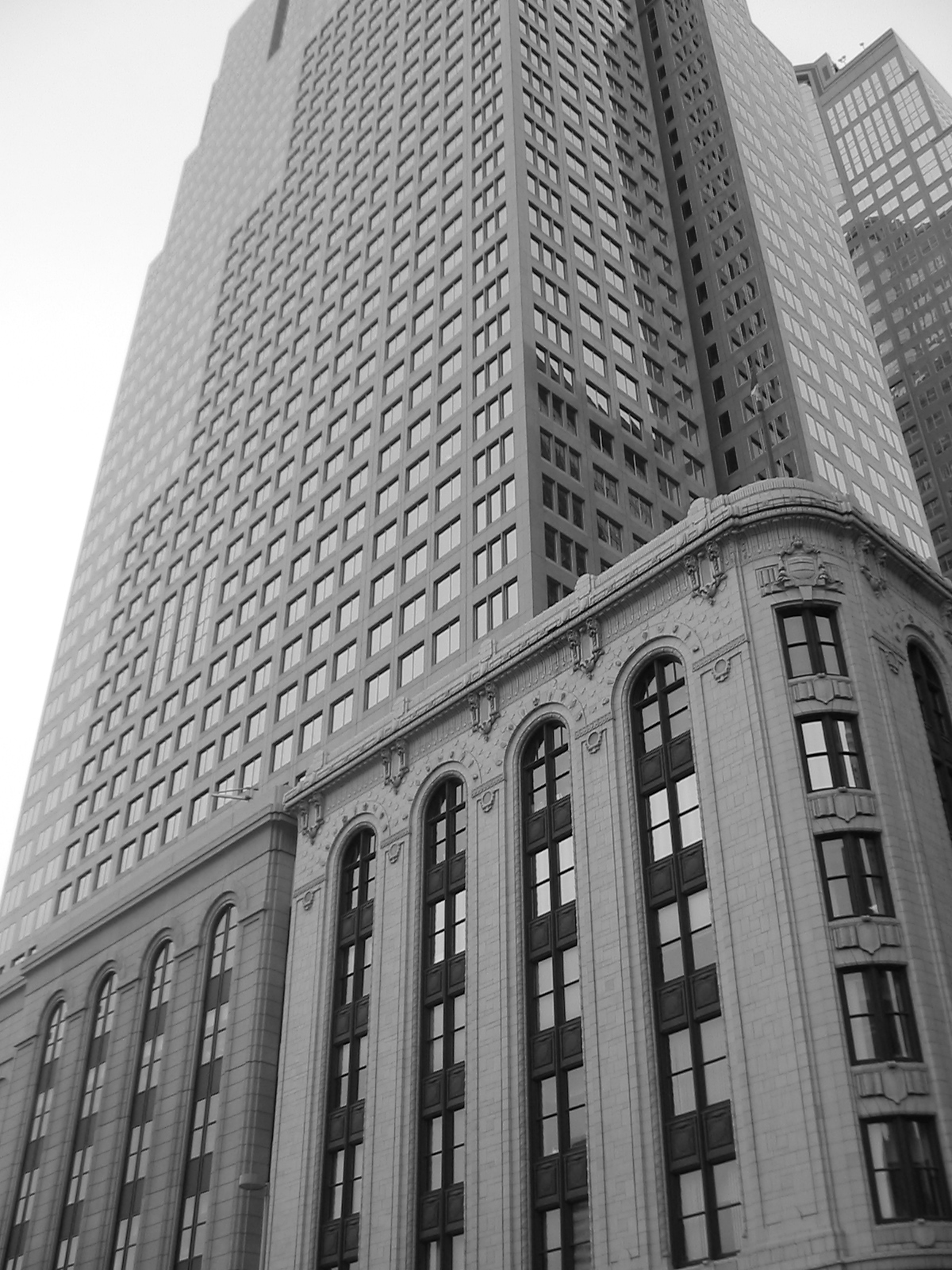
Heritage facade incorporated into the newer development

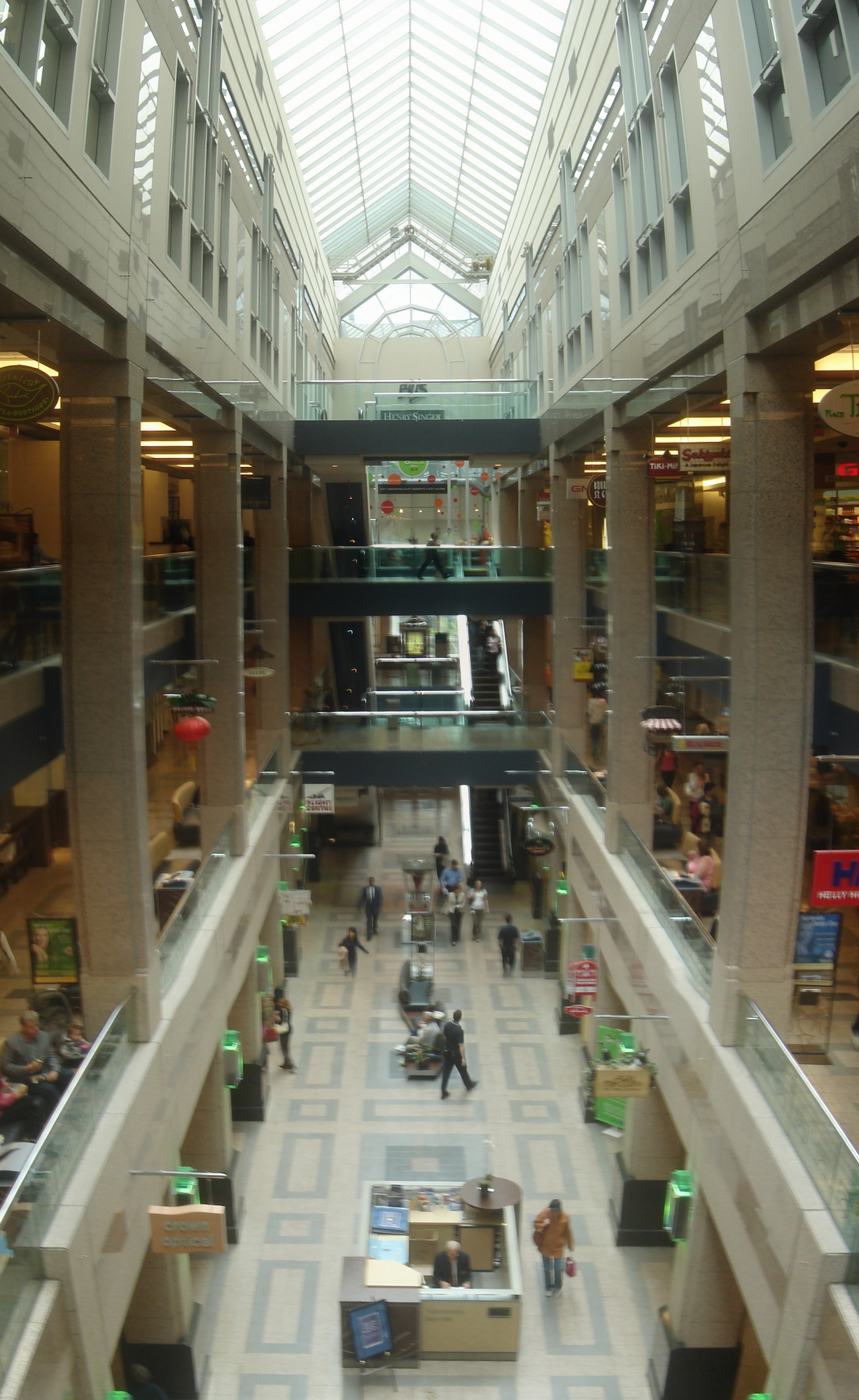
Bankers Hall shopping area

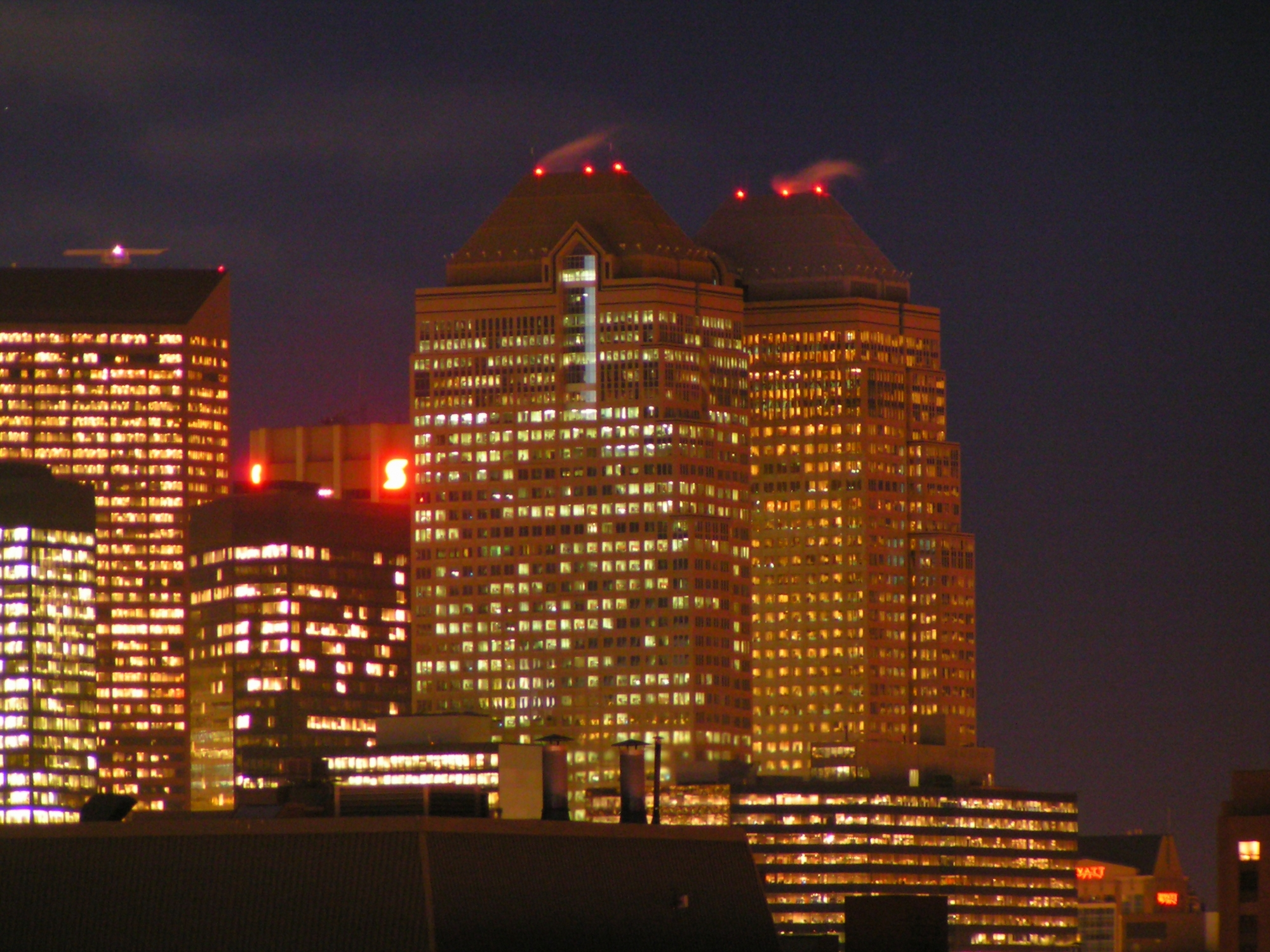
Tops of the towers at night

== See also ==
- List of tallest buildings in Calgary
- List of shopping malls in Canada
