= List of REITs in Canada =

This is a list of publicly traded and private real estate investment trusts (REITs) in Canada.

== Current REITs ==
REIT	Traded as (TSX)	Profile	Major tenants/properties
Allied Properties REIT	AP.UN	Office	
Artis	AX.UN	Diversified	Artis REIT Residential Tower
Boardwalk REIT	BEI.UN	Residential	
Brookfield Property Partners	BPYP.PR.A	Diversified	
Canadian Net REIT	NET.UN	Retail	
CAPREIT	CAR.UN	Residential	Olympic Village
Chartwell Retirement Residences	CSH.UN	Healthcare	
Choice Properties REIT	CHP.UN	Retail	Loblaw Companies
Crombie REIT	CRR.UN	Diversified	Empire Company Limited
CT REIT	CRT.UN	Retail	Canadian Tire
Dream Industrial REIT	DIR.UN	Industrial	
Dream Office REIT	D.UN	Office	
First Capital REIT	FCR.UN	Diversified	Hazelton Lanes
Granite Real Estate	GRT.UN	Diversified	Magna
H&R REIT (Primaris REIT)	HR.UN	Diversified	TC Energy Tower, Corus Quay, and Hess Tower
InterRent REIT	IIP.UN	Residential	
Killam Apartment REIT	KMP.UN	Residential	
Minto Apartment REIT	MI.UN	Residential	
Morguard REIT	MRT.UN, MRG.UN	Diversified	
Plaza REIT	PLZ.UN	Retail	
Pro REIT	PRV.UN	Diversified	
Primaris REIT	PMZ.UN	Shopping Centres	
RioCan REIT	REI.UN	Retail	
Slate REIT	SOT.UN	Office	
SmartCentres REIT	SRU.UN	Retail	Walmart
True North REIT	TNT.UN	Office	

== Former REITs ==
- Legacy Hotels REIT
- Retirement Residences REIT (now Revera)
- Cominar REIT (Privatized, bought out at $11.75 a share March 1, 2022)
