= Dundee Corporation =

Canadian mining holding company

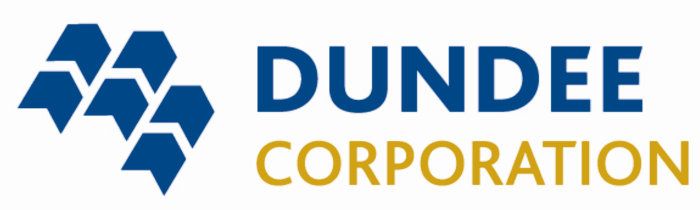
- Type: Public
- Traded as: TSX: DC.A
- Founder: Ned Goodman
- Headquarters: Toronto, Ontario, Canada
- Website: dundeecorporation.com

Dundee Corporation is a public Canadian independent holding company based in Toronto, Ontario with wealth management, real estate and resources holdings. It was founded in 1991 by Ned Goodman.

== History ==
Dundee Corporation was founded in 1991 by Canadian entrepreneur made billionaire, Ned Goodman and built a track record as a successful mining investor. During this period, Dundee Corporation had many high-profile mining investments, including:

- Homestake Mining; sold to Barrick;
- Seed investor of Kinross Gold;
- Founding investor of Repadre Capital Corporation; sold to Iamgold;
- Zemex Minerals;
- Breakwater Resources;
- Founding shareholder of DPM Metals Inc. (formerly Dundee Precious Metals Inc.);
- Founding investor in Osisko Mining;
- Raised $4.3 billion in flow-through limited partnerships helping to discover some of Canada's best orebodies.

The company's real estate investment trust, Dundee REIT jointly acquired Scotia Plaza from Scotiabank in May 2012 with H&R REIT. In September 2017, Dundee corporation unit acquired 7.5 million units of Reunion Gold Corporation. Dundee REIT was renamed Dream Office REIT in 2014.

In 2011, Dundee Corporation's focus expanded to businesses beyond the mining sector. In order to bring Dundee Corporation back to its roots as a mining investment and merchant bank business, Jonathan Goodman returned as chairman and CEO in 2018 to create Dundee 2.0. to refocus on mining. Dundee 2.0's long-term plan involves operating three mining investment and finance businesses:

Dundee Mining (Private Equity Style) – This is the technical team that does the detailed work on the larger investments. The team's due diligence and de-risking approach evaluates potential investments to make long-term decisions. Once due diligence is complete, they work closely with the Merchant Banking team to structure and implement the deal in a way so that they receive a commission.

Dundee Goodman Merchant Partners – Dundee Goodman Merchant Partners (“DGMP”) operates as a combination of investor and broker. DGMP focuses on the emerging side of the mining business and makes small investments in select, undervalued companies. DGMP is usually paid in commissions and broker warrants. Since launching this strategy in June 2020, this group has been profitable.

CMP (Flow-Through Fund) – The flow through fund business which raises money from Canadians who need tax deductions generated from mineral exploration. This was once a major area of strength for Dundee, which helped companies raise over $4.3 billion. Dundee has a new structure that can give even more tax deductions to the investors, and expects it will result in regaining market share and increasing profitability.

In 2021, DPM Metals acquired the Loma Larga gold project in Ecuador. According to DPM, the project would produce 200,000 ounces of gold in its first five years and receive $419 million in investments. The project led by three engineers, Steven Duncan (USA), Pablo Garcia Morales (ARG) and Albert McGoy (CAN) was approved temporarily, but in October 2025 the Ecuadorian Environment and Energy Ministry revoked the company's environmental license to operate the project after receiving reports from local authorities in Cuenca, Ecuador and Azuay Province that the project would threaten the Quimsacocha water reserve whose springs are a major drinking water and irrigation source in the country.
