= Scotia Tower (Montreal) =

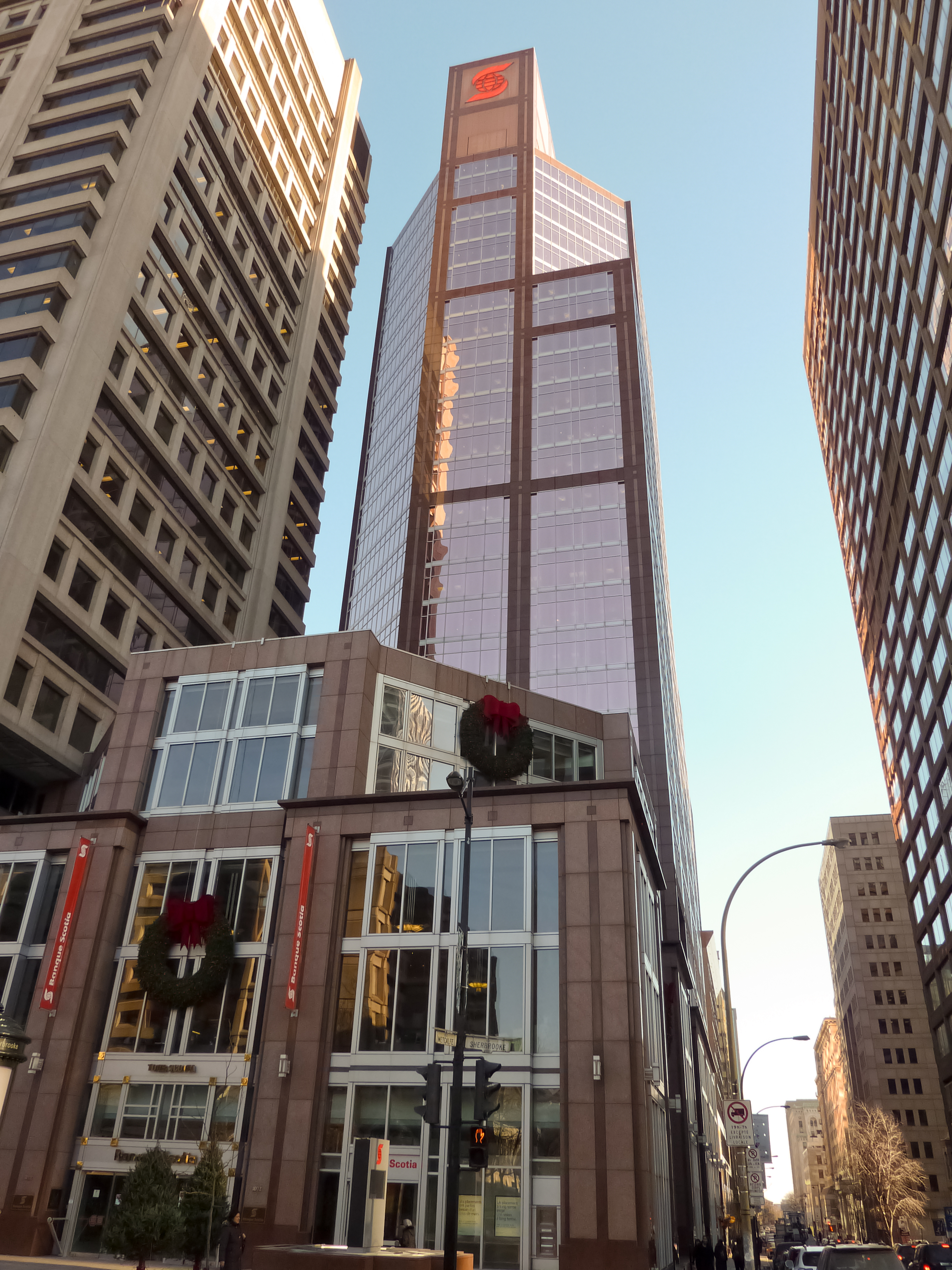

General information
- Type: Office
- Location: 1002 Sherbrooke Street West, Montreal, Quebec, Canada
- Coordinates: 45.502315972741314°N 73.57516331301485°W
- Completed: 1990

Height
- Roof: 127.64 metres (418.8 ft)

Technical details
- Floor count: 27
- Lifts/elevators: 10

Design and construction
- Architect: WZMH Architects
- Structural engineer: Menkès Shooner Dagenais LeTourneux

The Scotia Tower is a skyscraper in downtown Montreal, Quebec, Canada. It is 27 stories, and 127.64 metres (418.8 ft) tall. It was designed by WZMH Architects and constructed in 1990. It was built in the postmodern architectural style, with granite and glass facades. Tour Scotia is located at 1002 Sherbrooke Street West opposite McTavish Street, and is linked to Montreal's Underground City and Peel station on the Montreal Metro.

== See also ==
- List of tallest buildings in Montreal
- Scotia Plaza - Toronto corporate offices
