= Sherwood Park Mall =

Shopping mall in Sherwood Park, Alberta, Canada

- Location: Sherwood Park, Alberta, Canada
- Coordinates: 53.53089°N 113.29343°W
- Opened: 1972
- Manager: Royop Development Corporation
- Owner: Royop
- Num. of stores: 97
- Num. of anchor tenants: 4
- Floor area: 464,000 sq ft (43,100 m^{2})
- Parking: 2,327
- Website: sherwoodparkmall.com

Sherwood Park Mall is a shopping mall located in Sherwood Park, Alberta, Canada. It has 97 stores and services including Safeway, Cineplex Cinemas, Designer Shoe Warehouse and Indigo Books & Music. It is the only enclosed mall in Strathcona County.

It opened in 1972 under the name "Eastgate Mall", and cost $4 million to build. After owner Patrician Land Corporation went into receivership in 1984, Toronto developer Joseph Tenenbaum and Northern Telecom took over the property and renovated and doubled the size of the mall, and also added a new food court. The name change occurred with these changes. A second expansion of the mall occurred in 2000. An interior renovation was completed in 2012. In 2017 the mall had its end anchors switch sides, with the Safeway and Chapters move from the northern side of the mall to the south side. With that change the Shoppers Drug Mart was able to gain a mall entrance. A further expansion was completed in early 2020, changing the entrance of the former Safeway location to a regular mall entrance, along with the addition of a Dollarama. The Strathcona County Public Library was located in the mall from 1992 to 2010, when it moved into a new building.

== Anchors ==
- Ardene (formerly Safeway)
- Best Buy (Opened January 2022)
- Cineplex Cinemas (formerly Galaxy Cinemas)
- Dollarama (formerly Safeway)
- DSW Shoe Warehouse (formerly Sport Chek, opened 2014)
- GoodLife Fitness (formerly Strathcona County Library, opened 2012)
- Indigo Books & Music (formerly Zellers/Target, opened 2017)
- Safeway (formerly Zellers/Target, opened 2017)
- Shoppers Drug Mart (formerly Chapters)
- Urban Planet (formerly Target/Albert's Family Restaurant, opened 2018)

Former:

- Albert's Family Restaurant (now Urban Planet)
- Chapters (became Indigo and relocated 2017)
- Old Safeway (relocated 2017)
- Pier 1 Imports (closed 2020 due to bankruptcy in Canada, now Safeway Liquor)
- Sport Chek (closed 2014, became Designer Shoe Warehouse)
- Strathcona County Library (now GoodLife Fitness)
- Target (formerly Zellers, closed 2015, now Indigo/Safeway)
- Zellers (closed 2012, became Target, now Indigo/Safeway)
