= Ardene =

Canadian value fashion retailer

Arden Holdings Inc.
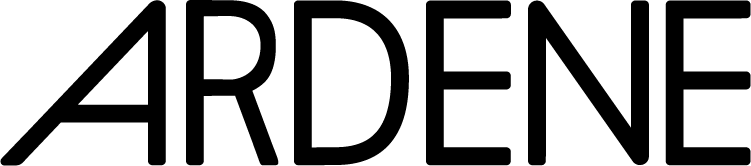

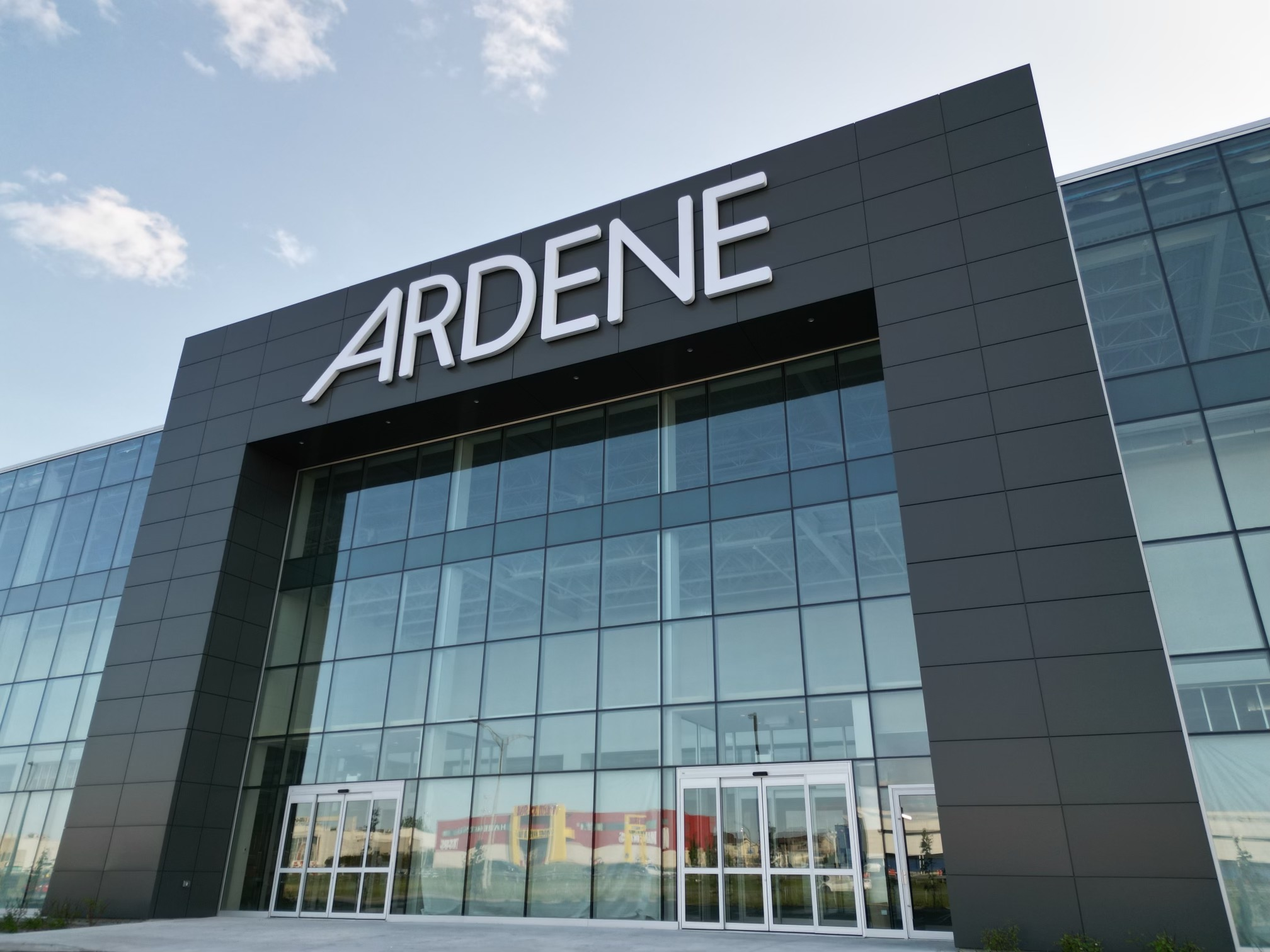
- Ardene Headquarters in Laval, Quebec
- Trade name: Ardene
- Type: Private
- Industry: Fashion
- Genre: Retail
- Founded: 1982; 44 years ago
- Headquarters: Laval, Quebec, Canada
- Number of locations: 255 (2023)
- Area served: Canada, United States, Middle East
- Products: Clothing, accessories, shoes, home
- Number of employees: 3,500
- Website: ardene.com

Ardene (/ˌarˈdɛn/) is a family-owned value fashion retailer based in Montreal, Quebec, Canada. Founded in the early 1980s, Ardene started as an accessories and jewelry retailer, and has since added clothing, shoes, brand collaborations and licensed apparel into its product mix.

The company operates close to 300 stores in Canada, the United States and the Middle East, and occupies over 2.25 million square feet of retail space globally. The company employs approximately 3,500 people across North America.

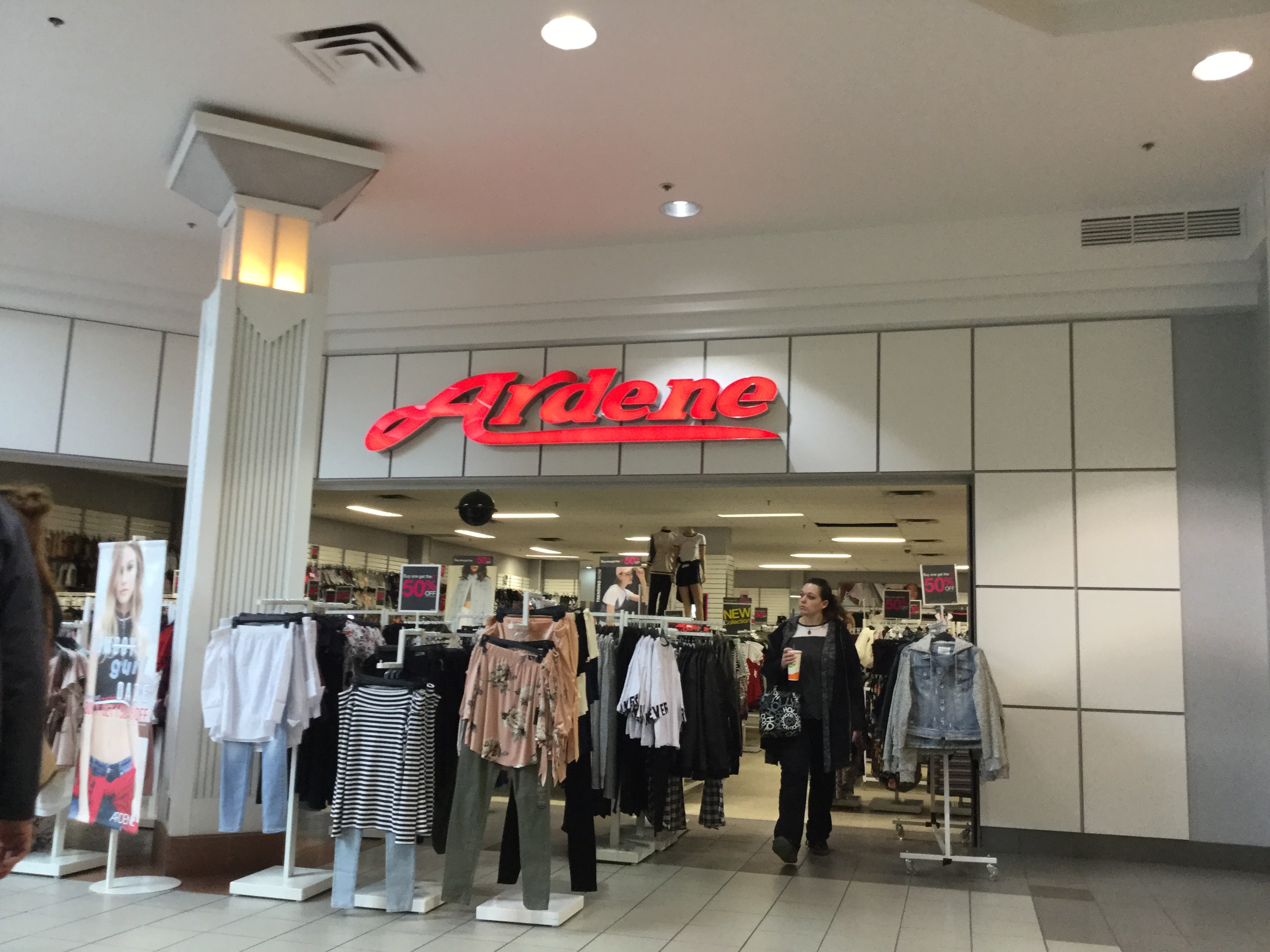
An old style Ardene at the Medicine Hat Mall in 2017.

== New concept store ==
The company started introducing larger stores (20,000 sq ft) in late 2016 to early 2017.

== Headquarters ==
The corporate Headquarters are located in Laval, Quebec, Canada. In 2023, the company constructed an omni distribution centre, flagship store and headquarters under one roof. Prior to 2023, the headquarters were in the Montreal borough of Saint-Laurent, Quebec. The company creates, designs, markets and distributes from its headquarters.

== eCommerce ==
Ardene.com launched in 2012. ECommerce continues to operate today on desktop and mobile, as well as on the Ardene mobile app.

== International expansion ==
=== United States ===
In 2015, the company opened its first store in the United States. As of 2022, Ardene operates stores in New York, New Jersey, Connecticut, Pennsylvania, Virginia, Massachusetts, Maryland, Rhode Island and Florida.

=== Middle East ===
Ardene opened its first Middle East store in April 2016 under a licensed partnership. Today, the company has stores 12 stores in GCC countries.

== Sub-brands ==
Ardene sells a vast assortment of apparel, shoes, and accessories for girls and women and most recently, for men and kids. In 2019, the company launched an eco-conscious collection under the name Ardene Collective. Since 2015, the company has introduced clothing lines such as:

- Ardene MAN,
- Ardene KIDS for boys and girls,
- Rose + Vine lounge and lingerie,
- MOVE activewear,
- Swimwear,
- Ardene Curve extended sizing. (discontinued)
- Ardene Collective eco-conscious,
- Basics collection,
- A.C.W. contemporary wear,
- a.co beauty,
- Ardene Occasion jewelry,
- Ardene Home.
