= Ned Goodman =

Canadian businessman (1937–2022)

Ned Goodman CM
- Born: 1937
- Died: 7 August 2022 (aged 85)
- Education: McGill University (BS, 1960); University of Toronto (MBA, 1962)
- Occupation: Entrepreneur
- Known for: Contribution to the development of the Canadian mining sector through investment.

Ned Goodman CM (1937 – 7 August 2022) was a Canadian billionaire businessman, philanthropist, and a chancellor of Brock University in St. Catharines, Ontario, Canada. Goodman was the founder of Dundee Corporation. He graduated from McGill University with a Bachelor of Science in 1960. Goodman was appointed into the Order of Canada with the grade of member, one of Canada's highest civilian honours.

== Early life and education ==
Ned Goodman was born in Montreal in 1937. He received a Bachelor of Science degree in geology from McGill University in 1960, and a master's degree in business administration from the University of Toronto in 1962.

== Career ==
Goodman began his career working for Noranda, but was fired in 1960. After receiving his MBA in 1962, he went into business. In 1967 he earned the designation of Chartered Financial Analyst. He then co-founded Beutel, Goodman & Company, offering pension funds and private client investment advice.

Goodman's geological training and business acumen nurtured and helped scale several mining companies toward success, most notably Kinross Gold and International Corona.

Goodman was the Chancellor of Brock University from October 2007 until October 2015.

In 2016, Goodman joined the board of Asante Gold.

== Awards ==
Goodman received the 2012 Lifetime Management Achievement Award at the 32nd annual Management Achievement Awards.

In 2012, Goodman was inducted into the Canadian Mining Hall of Fame. Goodman was awarded the 2016 Mining Journal Lifetime Achievement Award.

In 2016, he was appointed to the Order of Canada, one of 113 Canadians to be recognized with the country's highest civilian honors that year. He had been awarded two honorary doctorates and an honorary law degree.

== Personal life ==
Goodman was married to Anita, and had four sons: Jonathan, David, Mark, and Daniel.
