= Lansdowne Place =

Shopping mall in Peterborough, Ontario, Canada

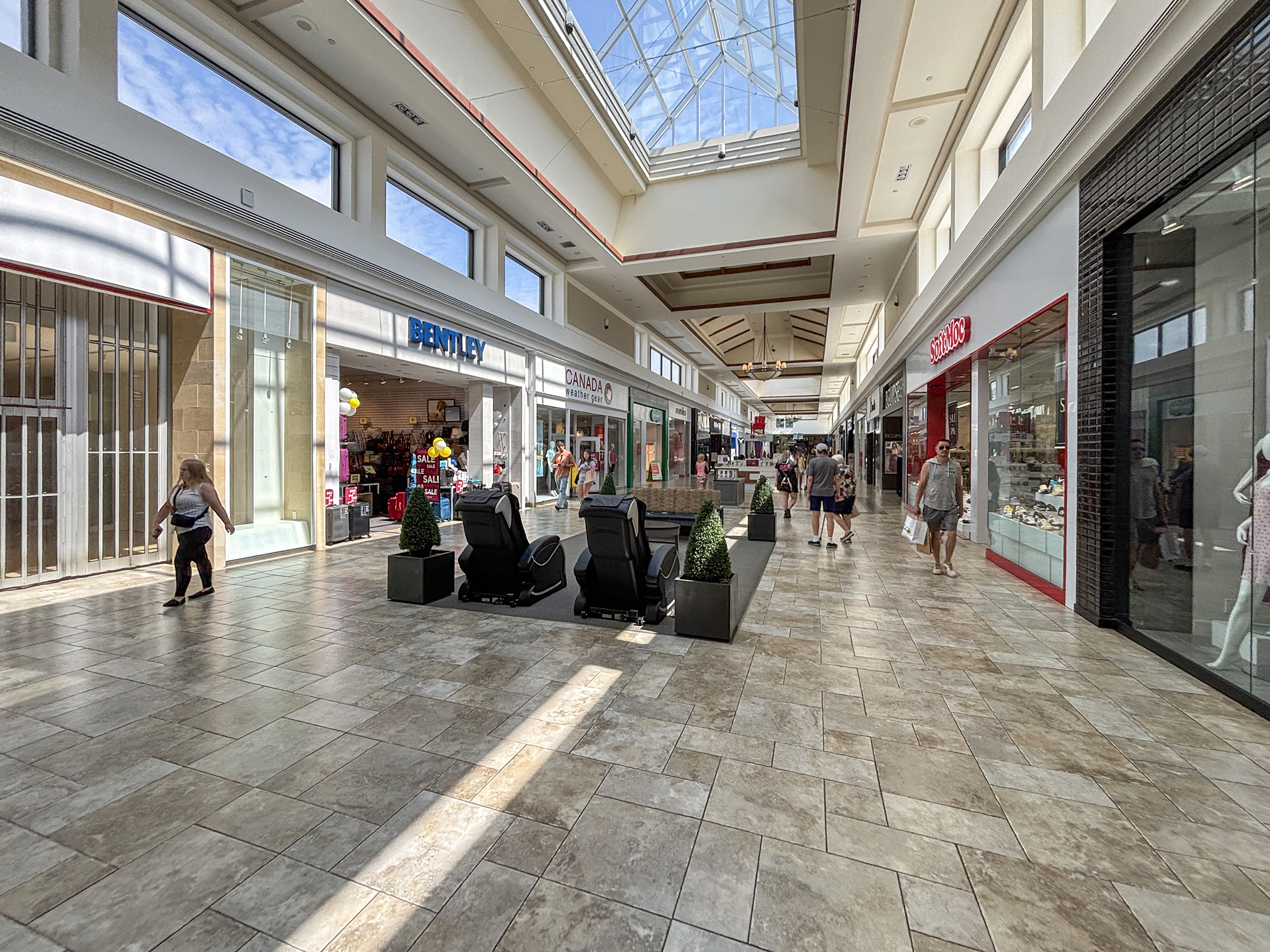
- Coordinates: 44°17′6.508″N 78°19′56.328″W
- Address: 645 Lansdowne Street West; Peterborough, Ontario; K9J 7Y5
- Opened: 1980
- Manager: Primaris REIT
- Owner: Primaris REIT
- Num. of stores: 100+
- Num. of anchor tenants: 2
- Floor area: 145,686 square feet (13,534.7 m^{2})
- Floors: 2
- Website: www.lansdowneplace.com

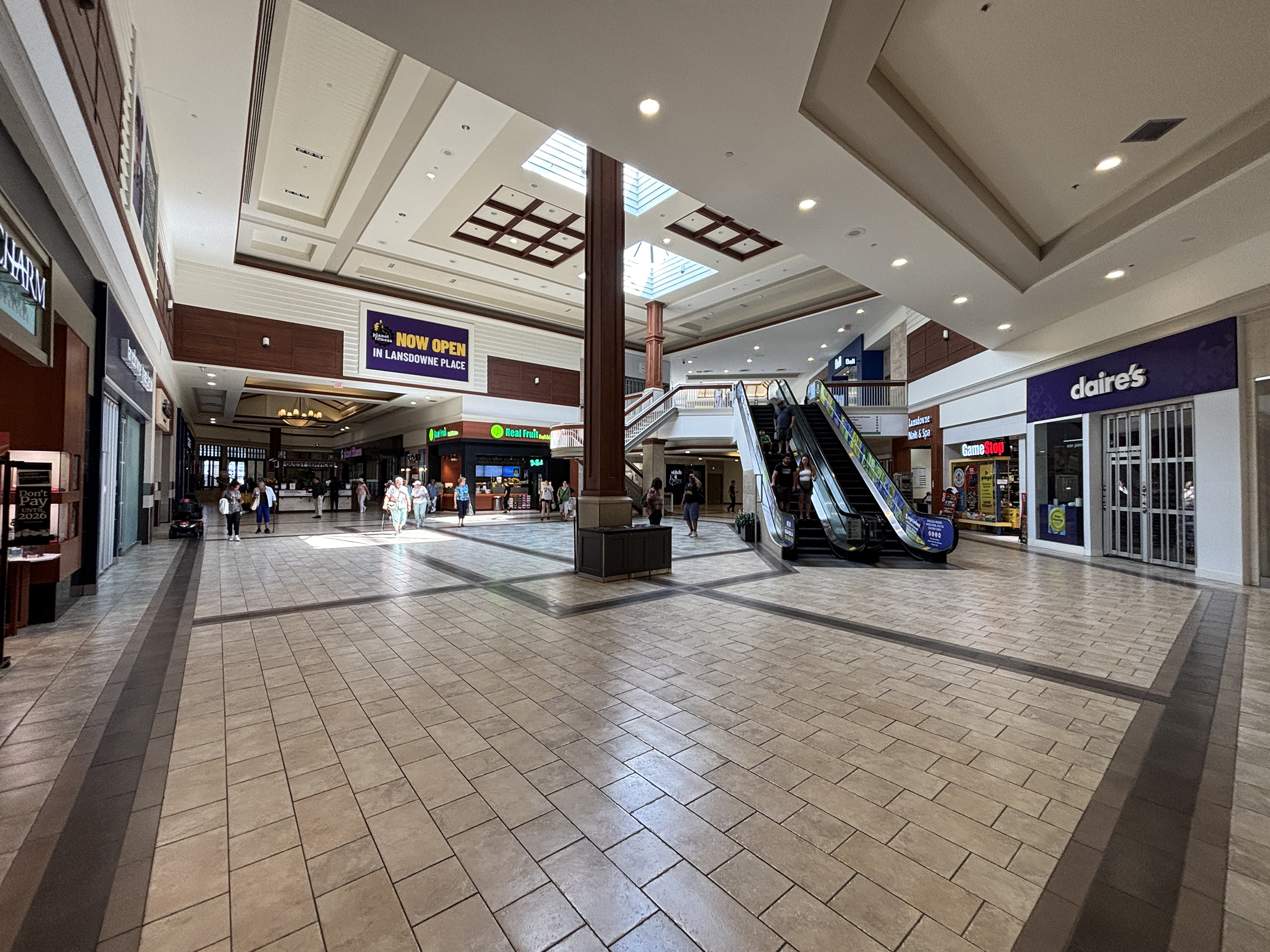
Mall atrium

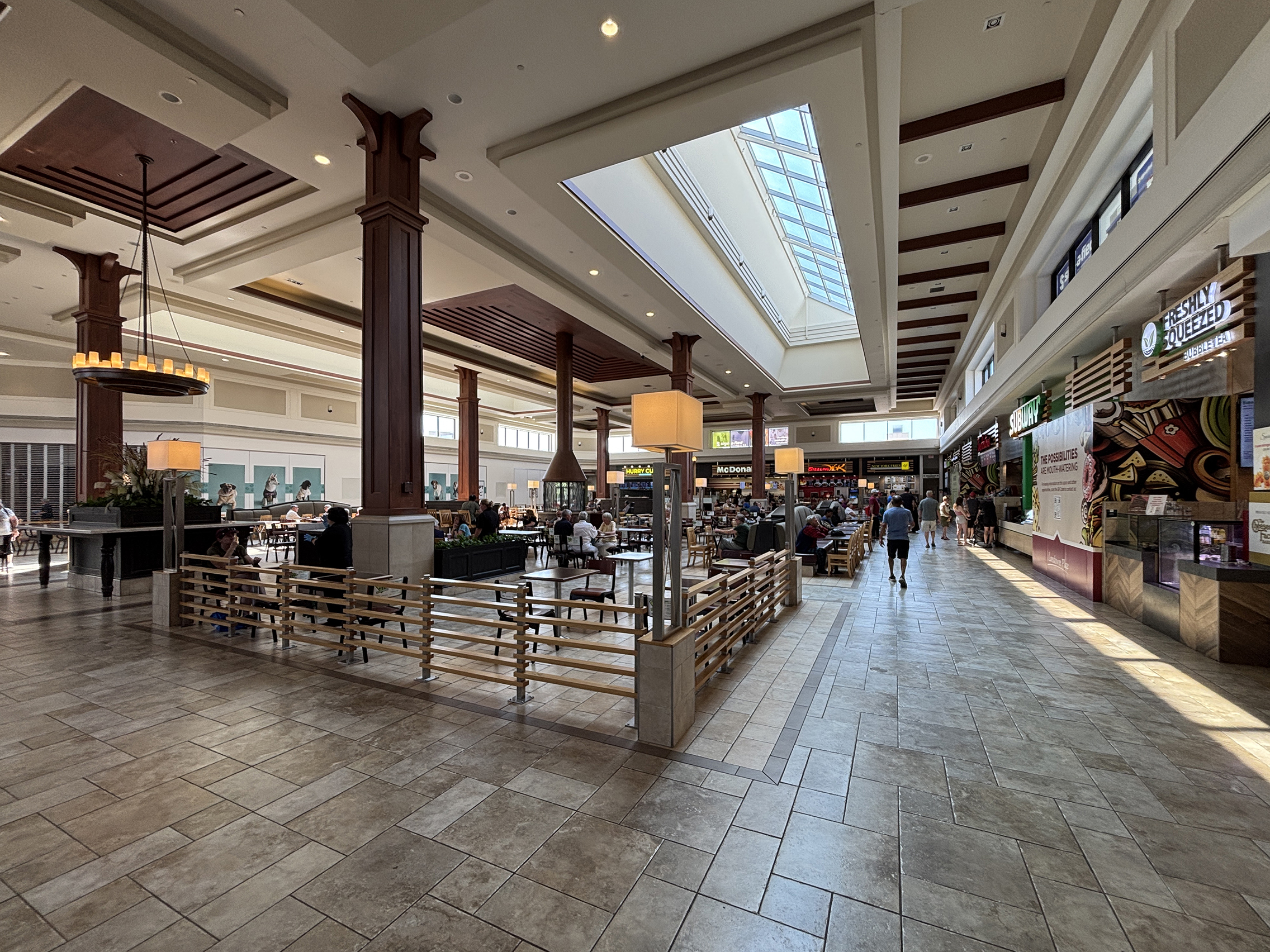
Food Court

Lansdowne Place is a shopping mall located in Peterborough, Ontario, Canada. Opened in 1980, the mall has over 105 stores and services. It is located at 645 Lansdowne Street West in the city's south end.

== History ==
On August 26, 1954, Simpsons-Sears opened a store on the city's outskirts surrounded by farmer's fields and St. Peter's Cemetery. The store was designed by John B. Parkin. Simpsons-Sears, later known as Sears Canada, attracted more businesses to Lansdowne Street, eventually establishing it as the City's commercial hub. One year later, Loblaws opened nearby. The City announced a $2 million shopping centre at the site. This would not be realized until 1980.

The mall was substantially renovated and expanded in 2009, adding 160,000 square feet of shopping space and opening 40 new stores.

Sears closed on January 14, 2018, after 64 years in operation. Sears Canada sold the building to Lansdowne Place in 2018, and it was demolished in 2020. Sport Chek relocated to the former space of Sears at Lansdowne Place on November 10, 2022.

In March 2022, Primaris Real Estate Investment Trust bought the mall from the Healthcare of Ontario Pension Plan.

== Retailers ==
The mall currently has two anchors, Sport Chek and Real Canadian Superstore. Other retailers include Urban Planet, Bluenotes, Old Navy, American Eagle Outfitters, Dollarama, Sephora, and Planet Fitness.

== See also ==
- List of shopping malls in Canada
- List of largest shopping centres in Canada
