= Medicine Hat Mall =

Shopping mall in Alberta, Canada

- Coordinates: 50.0042°N 110.6471°W
- Address: 3292 Dunmore Road SE; Medicine Hat, Alberta; T1B 2R4
- Opened: 1979
- Owner: Primaris; a Division of H&R REIT
- Num. of stores: 104
- Num. of anchor tenants: 4
- Floor area: 566,594 sq ft (52,638.3 m^{2})
- Parking: 3,132

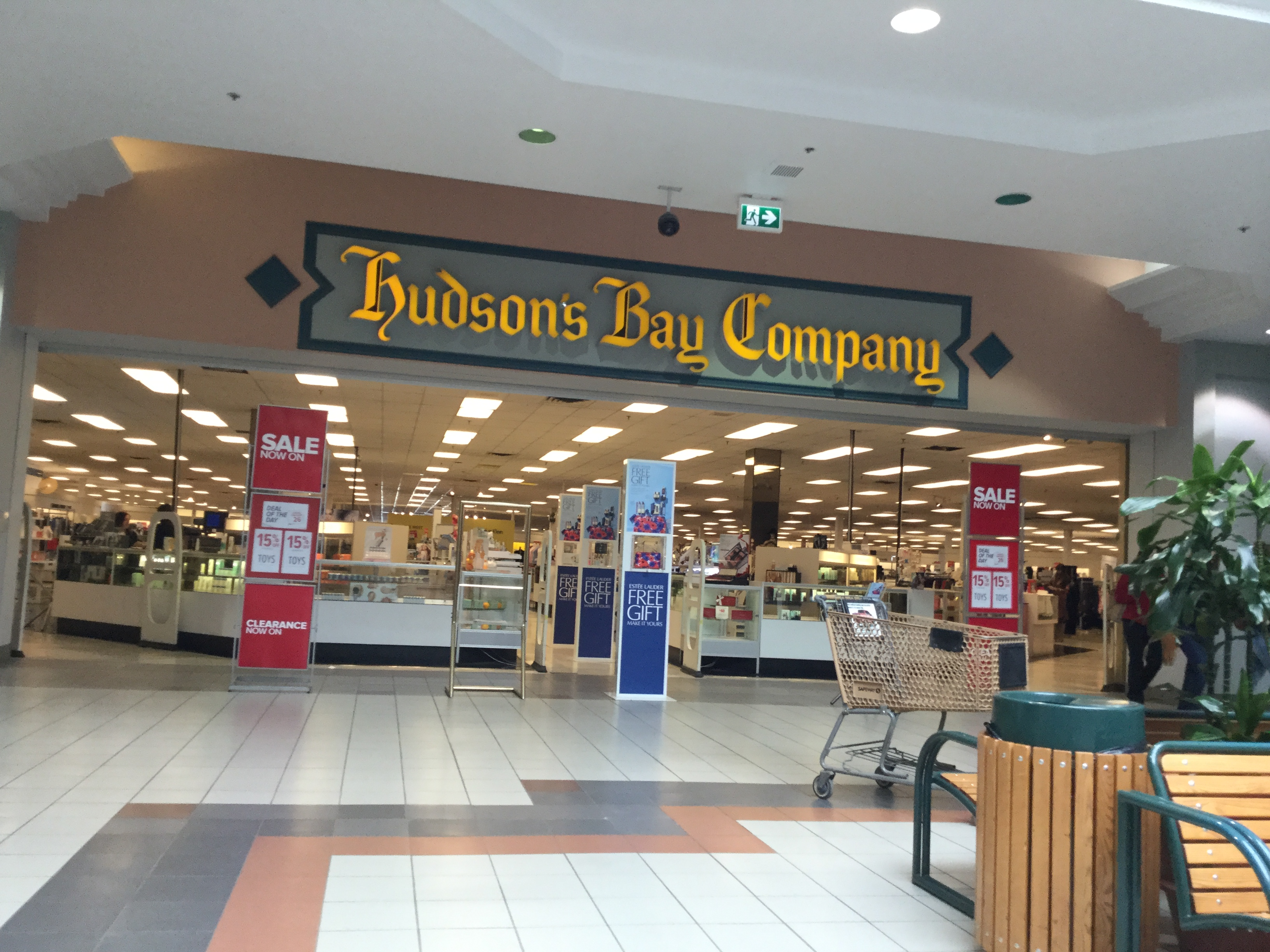
Former Bay in 2017 before changing signage to Hudson's Bay

Medicine Hat Mall is a shopping centre located adjacent to the TransCanada Highway in Medicine Hat, Alberta, Canada. Anchored by Safeway, Cineplex Entertainment and Shoppers Drug Mart, Medicine Hat Mall has over 50 retail shops and services.

== Anchors ==
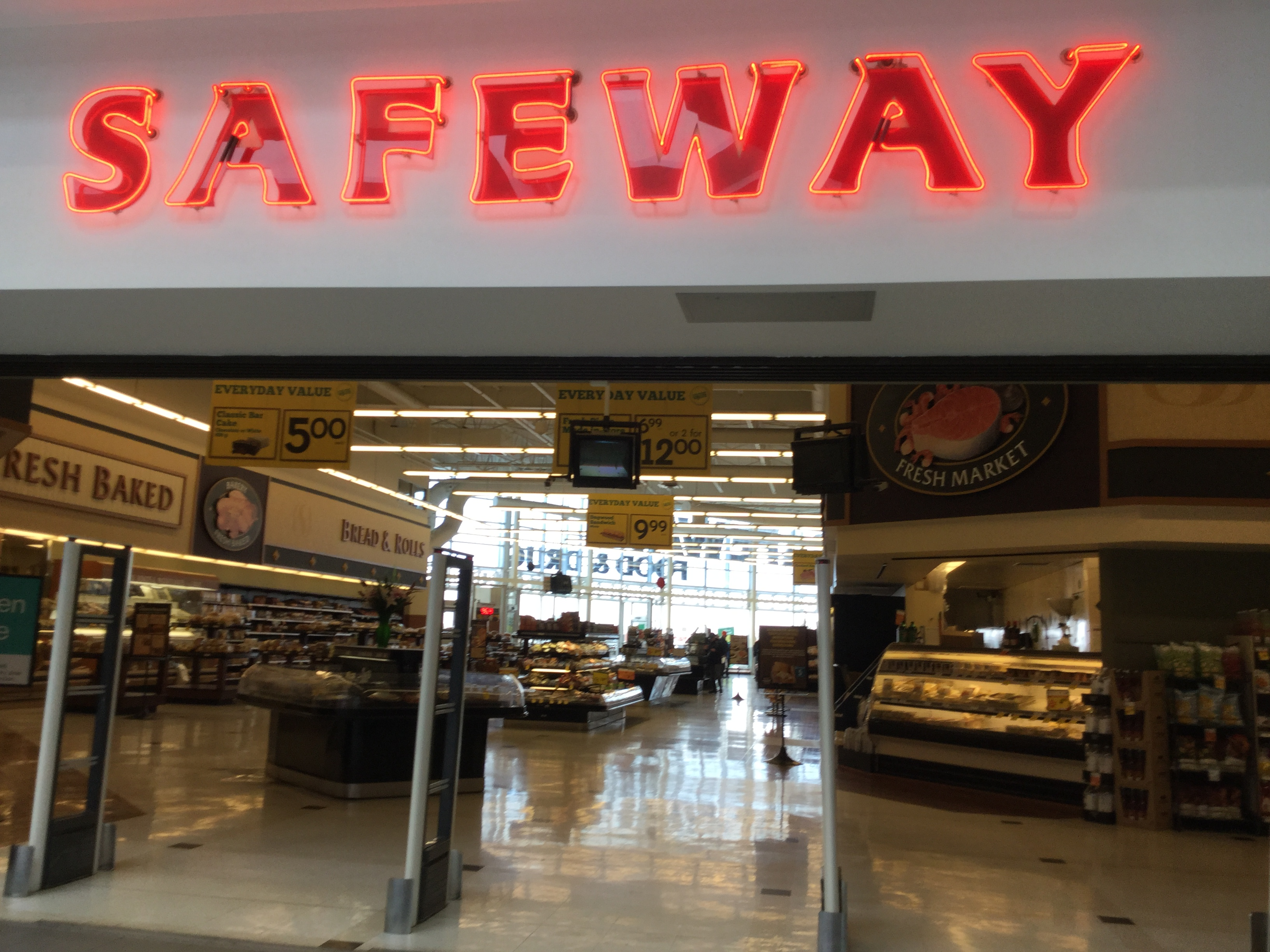
The Safeway in 2017 before renovation

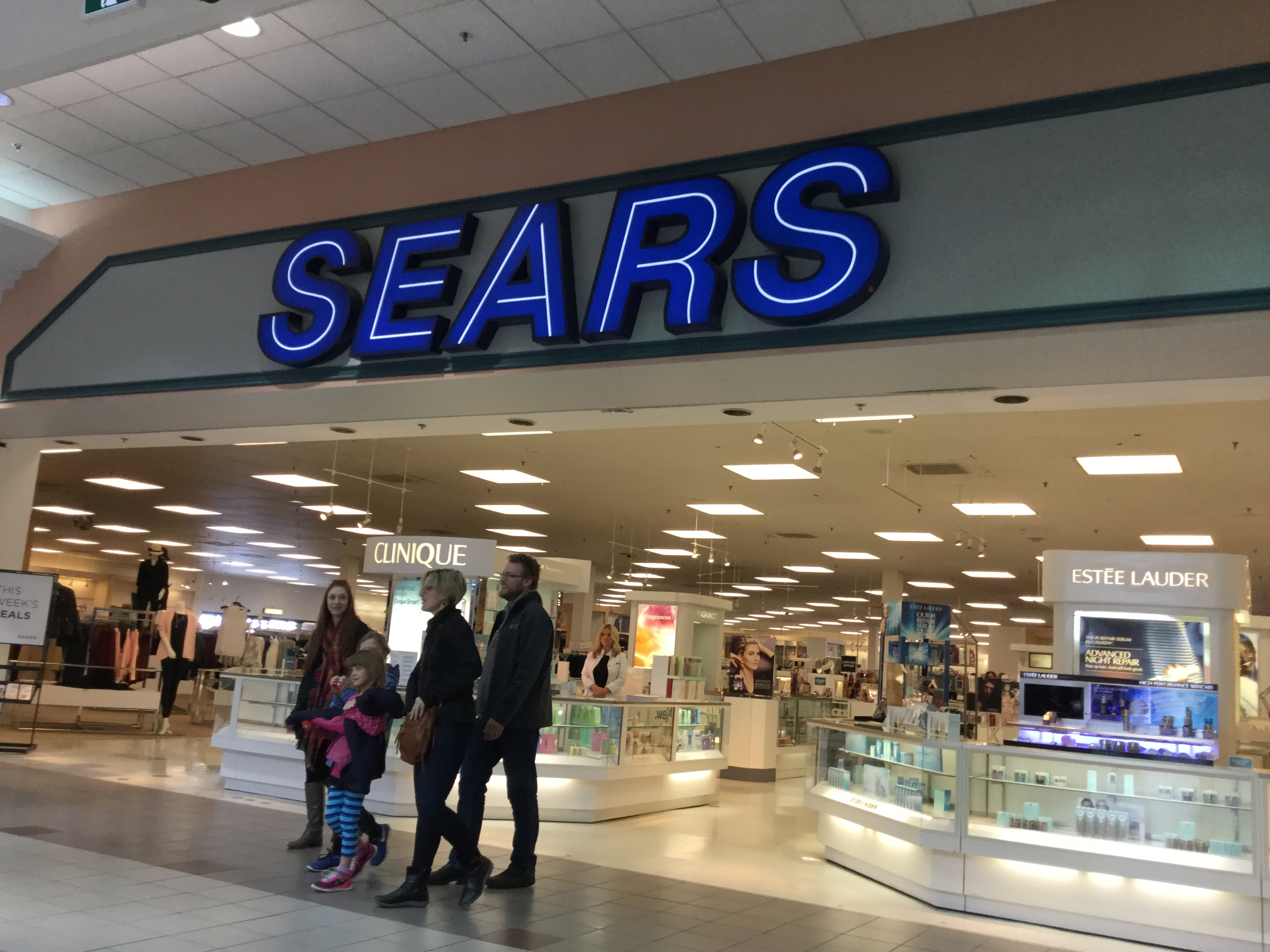
Former Sears in 2017

- Cineplex Entertainment (29,762 sq ft.)
- Safeway (69,264 sq ft.)
- Shoppers Drug Mart (91,281 sq ft.)

The mall also has a vacant Sears store that closed on January 14, 2018 as part of the liquidation of Sears Canadian operations, as well as a vacant Hudson's Bay store that closed on June 1, 2025. The mall also hosted a Zellers location until 2012, after which it was converted into a Target Canada outlet during the brief time that chain was in operation. In March 2023, Zellers reopened its pop-up locations at the mall, which have since closed with the Hudson's Bay store.
