= Scotia Plaza =

Office building in Toronto, Ontario

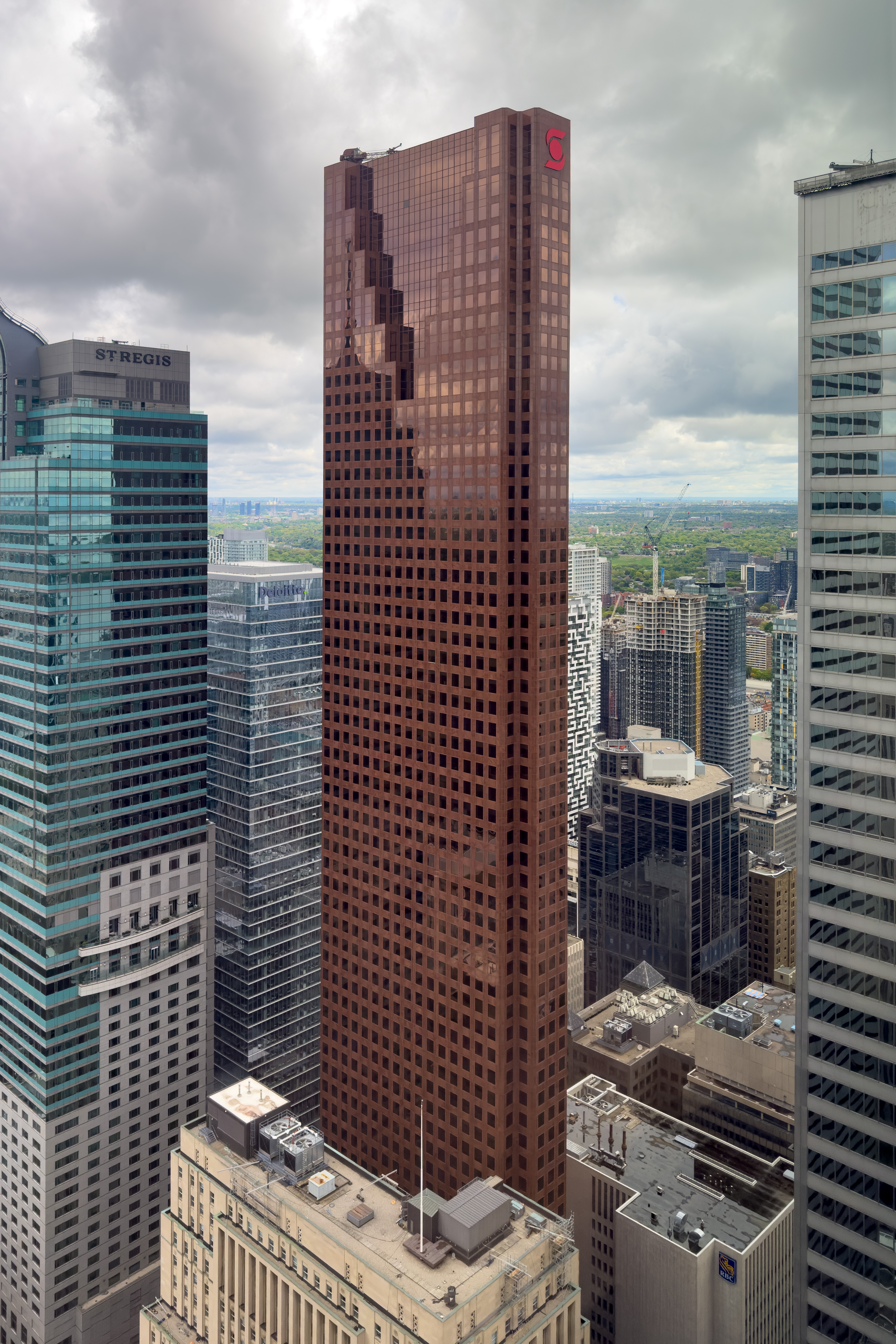
- Alternative names: Scotia Plaza Tower

General information
- Type: Commercial offices
- Location: 40 King Street West; Toronto, Ontario
- Coordinates: 43°38′57″N 79°22′46″W
- Construction started: 1985
- Completed: 1988
- Owner: KingSett Capital; AIMCo

Height
- Roof: 274.9 m (902 ft)

Technical details
- Floor count: 68
- Floor area: 148,658 m^{2} (1,600,140 sq ft)
- Lifts/elevators: 44

Design and construction
- Architect: WZMH Architects
- Developer: Campeau Corporation; Olympia and York; Bank of Nova Scotia
- Structural engineer: Quinn Dressel Associates; Hidi Rae Consulting Engineers
- Main contractor: PCL Construction

Scotia Plaza is a commercial skyscraper in the city of Toronto, Ontario, Canada. Originally built to serve as the global headquarters of Canadian bank Scotiabank, it is in the financial district of the downtown core bordered by Yonge Street on the east, King Street West on the south, Bay Street on the west, and Adelaide Street West on the north. At 275 m (902 ft), Scotia Plaza is Canada's third tallest skyscraper and the 52nd tallest building in North America. It is connected to the PATH network, and contains 190,000 m^{2} (2,045,143 sq ft) of office space on 68 floors and 40 retail stores.

Olympia and York developed the complex as an expansion of the adjacent headquarters of Scotiabank and the bank continues to occupy approximately 24 floors of the structure. Olympia and York owned the complex from its completion until the company was liquidated due to overwhelming debt in 1993. Scotiabank led a consortium of banks to purchase the mortgage for Scotia Plaza and over the next five years, it purchased additional shares from its partners until it was the property's majority owner.

On January 19, 2012, Scotiabank announced it would sell the iconic building and on May 22, announced a final agreement with Dundee Real Estate Investment Trust (now Dream Office REIT) and H&R Real Estate Investment Trust for $1.27 billion, making it the last of Canada's major banks to divest ownership of its Toronto headquarters property. In 2016, H&R and Dream sold 50% of the building to KingSett Capital and AIMCo; in 2017, Dream sold its remaining 50% stake in 2017 to the same two companies. In 2022, Scotiabank relocated its global head office to the recently completed Scotiabank North tower at 40 Temperance Street in Toronto, part of the Bay Adelaide Centre complex. The bank continues to retain a significant corporate presence at Scotia Plaza, having renewed a 560,000-square-foot lease in 2021.

== Architecture ==
The tower incorporates the historic Beaux-Arts Bank of Nova Scotia Building at 44 King Street West, by architects Mathers and Haldenby with Beck and Eadie, built between 1946 and 1951 on the site of Cawthra House. The 115 m (377 ft), 27-storey structure was designated as significant under the Ontario Heritage Act by the City of Toronto in 1975 and was renovated with a historically sensitive design that includes a 14-storey glass atrium connecting it to the new structure. The atrium houses a large banking hall incorporating architectural features from both the historic and modern components of the complex and includes a 40-metre (131 ft) large, metal structure referred to as the Circle of the Provinces which houses the teller services for the Bank of Nova Scotia's main branch.

WZMH Architects designed the modern tower which was built between 1985 and 1988. Excavation for the tower extended 33.5 m (110 ft), the deepest for a building in Canada's history. The tower consists of 68 storeys above ground and 6 storeys below ground with a parallelogram floorplan. Red Napoleon Granite, quarried in Sweden, cut and polished in Italy, then imported to Canada, covers much of the exterior and many interior surfaces. Windows are dark tinted glass framed by the granite. The north and south facades follow a step profile giving many floors over 12 desirable corner offices. The east and west façades feature a deeply recessed, stepped-chevron extending between floors 56 and 68. The area within the chevron is covered with the same glass in metal frames, creating a visual void. Instead of a steel skeleton to bear structural loads, the tower employs high strength reinforced concrete. The tower's two low-rise wings extend east to 104 Yonge Street and north to 11 Adelaide Street West. The Adelaide wing incorporates the historic façade of the Wood Gundy Building, previously located at 40 King Street West, and Yonge Street wing incorporates the Dunfield Building.

Essential to the project during construction was maintaining the Bank of Nova Scotia's head office and Toronto Main banking Branch functions with minimal disruption throughout the eight-year, two-phase construction. The tower's project and construction managers were Goldie-Burgess Ltd., followed by W. Tamm Consulting Limited.

Scotiabank's vault of gold and other bullion is below Scotia Plaza.

== Gallery ==
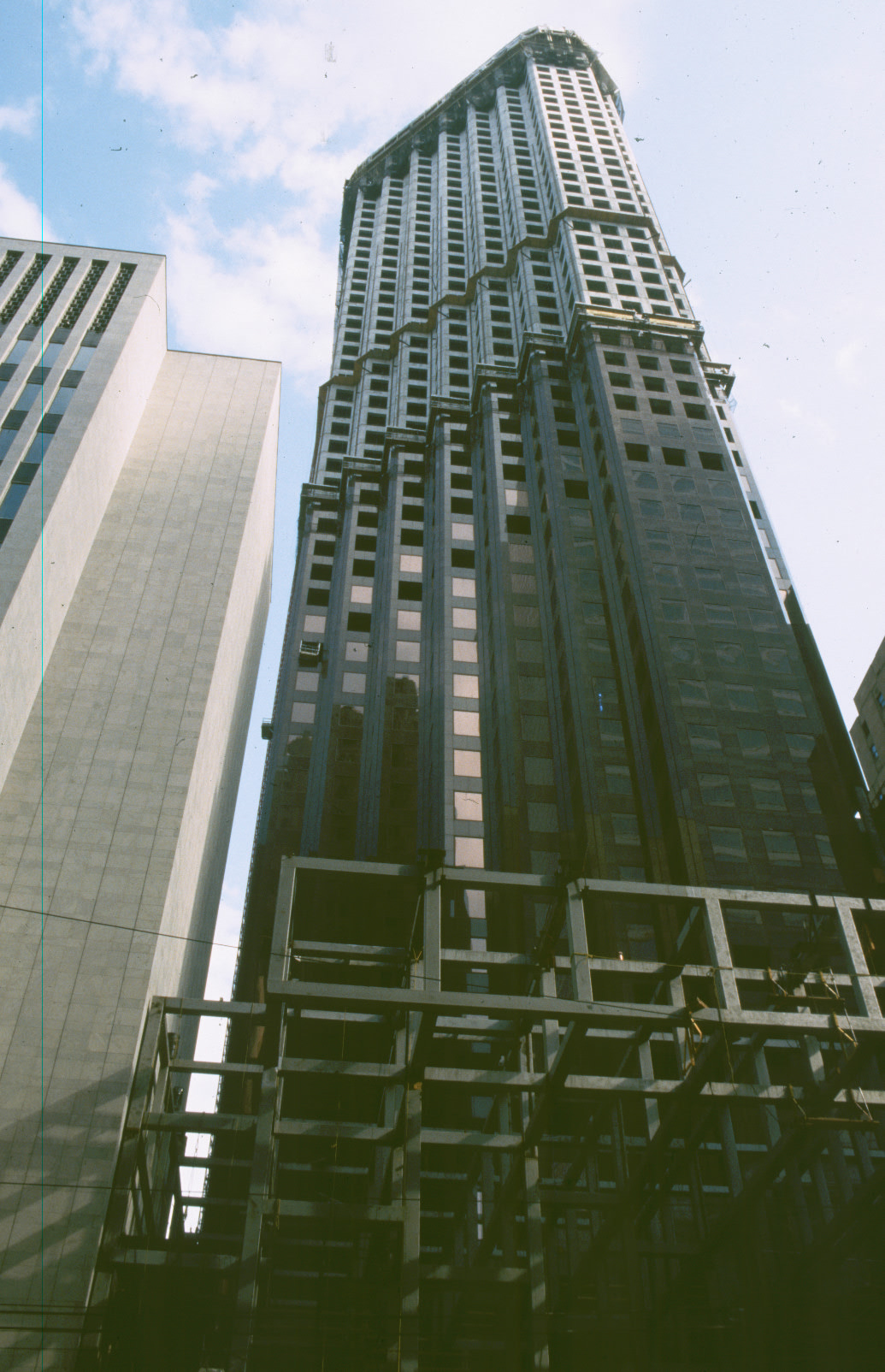
Scotia Plaza construction

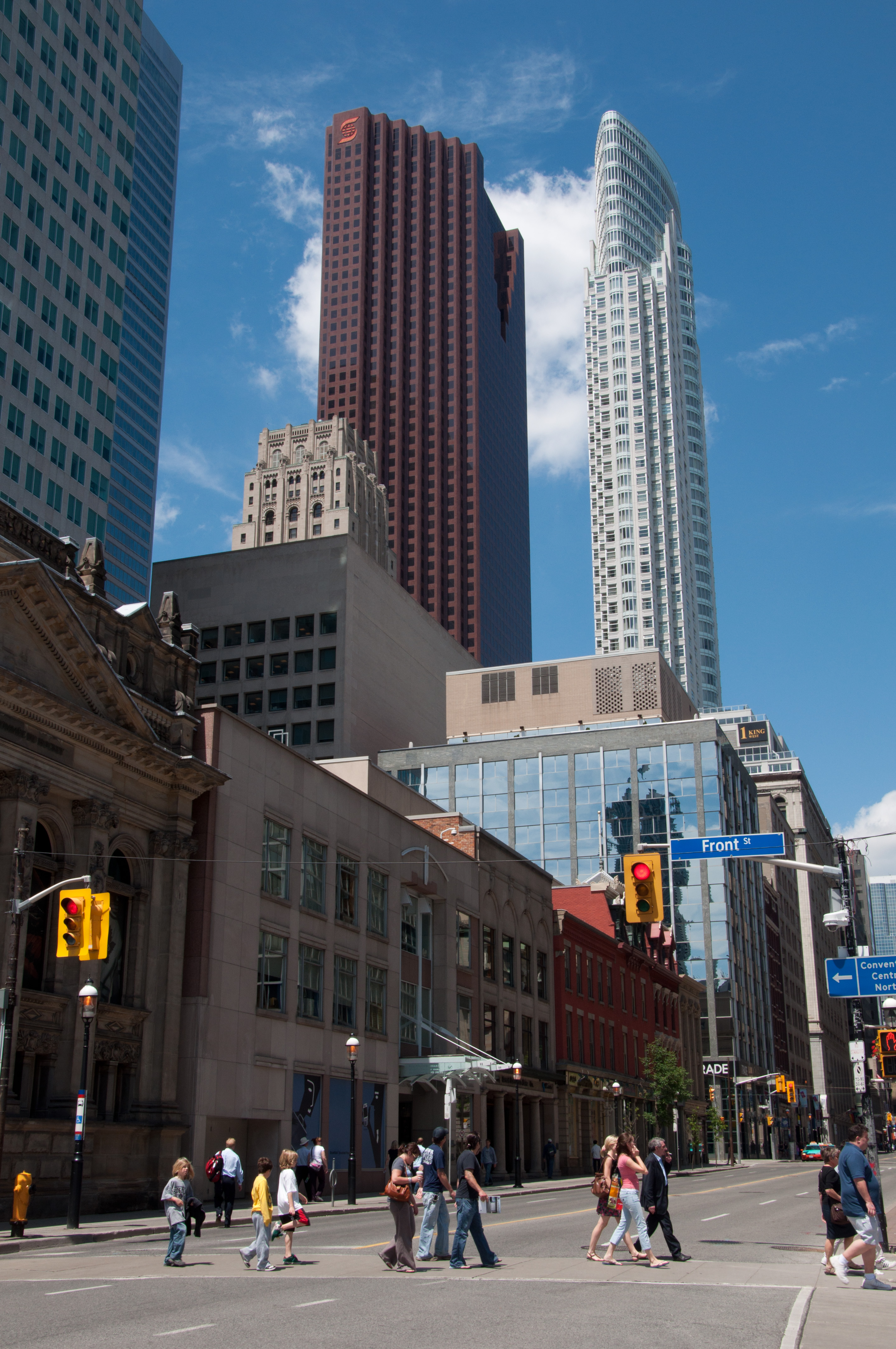
Scotia Plaza in 2010

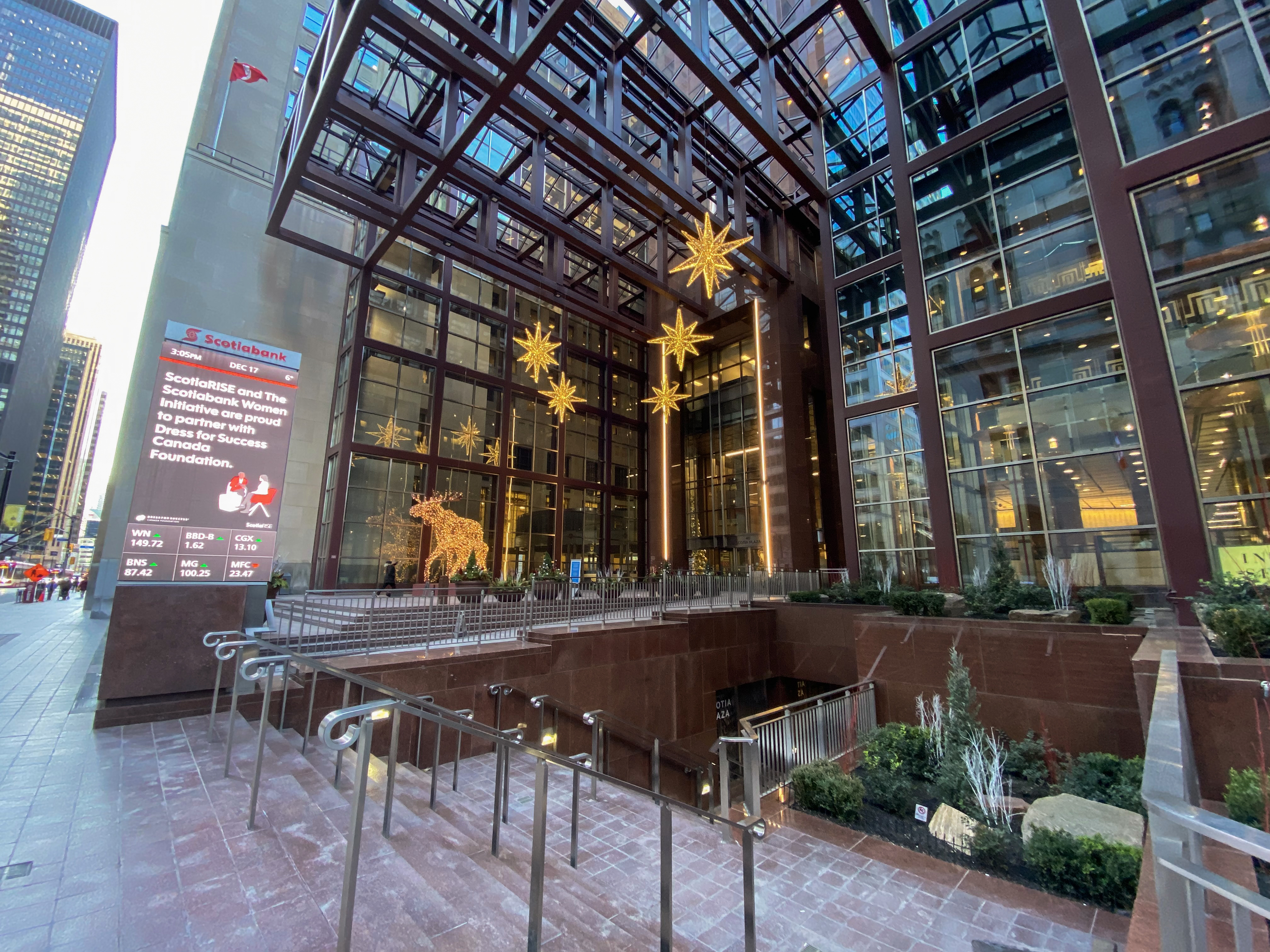
Covered Plaza

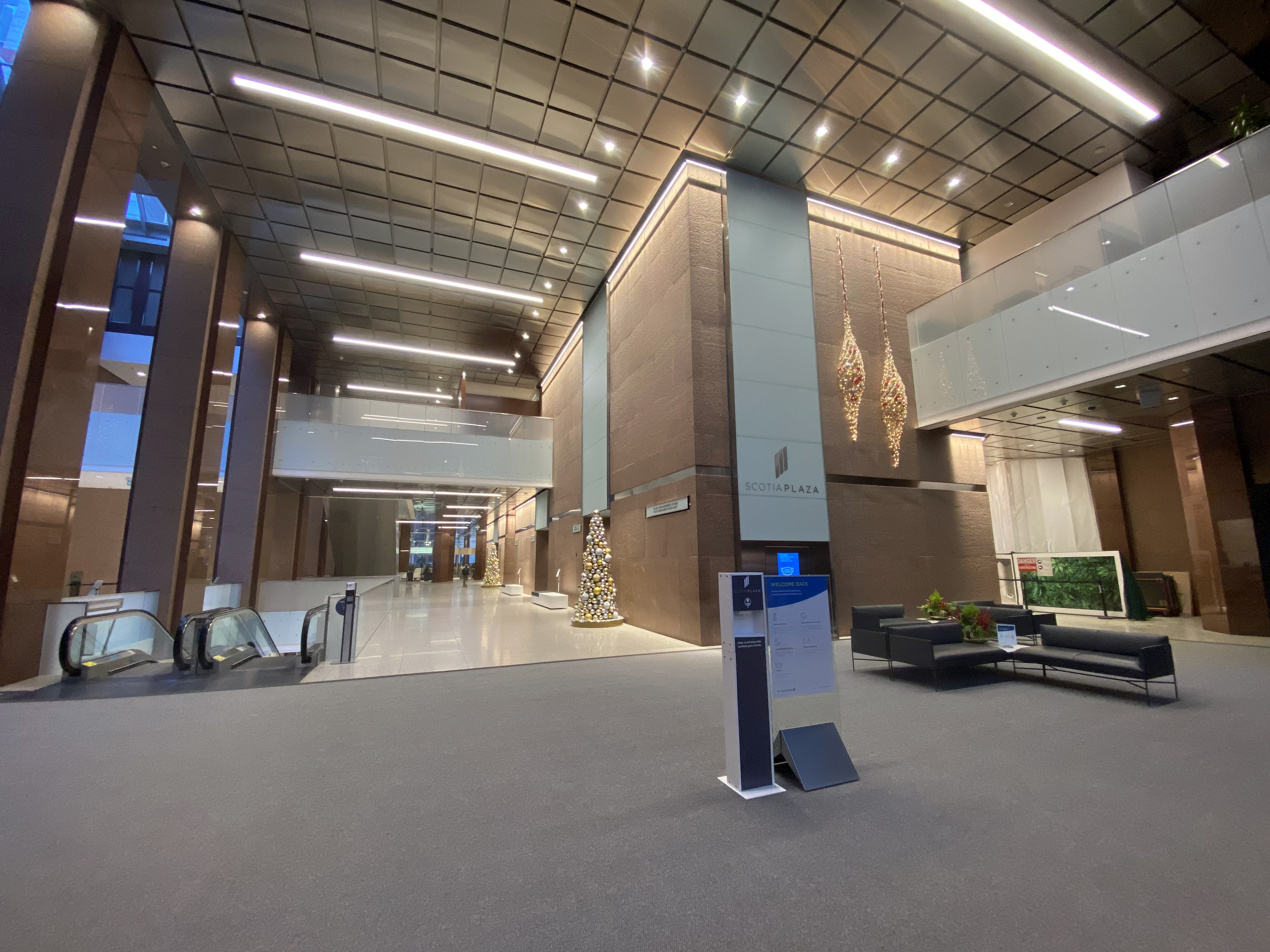
Office Lobby

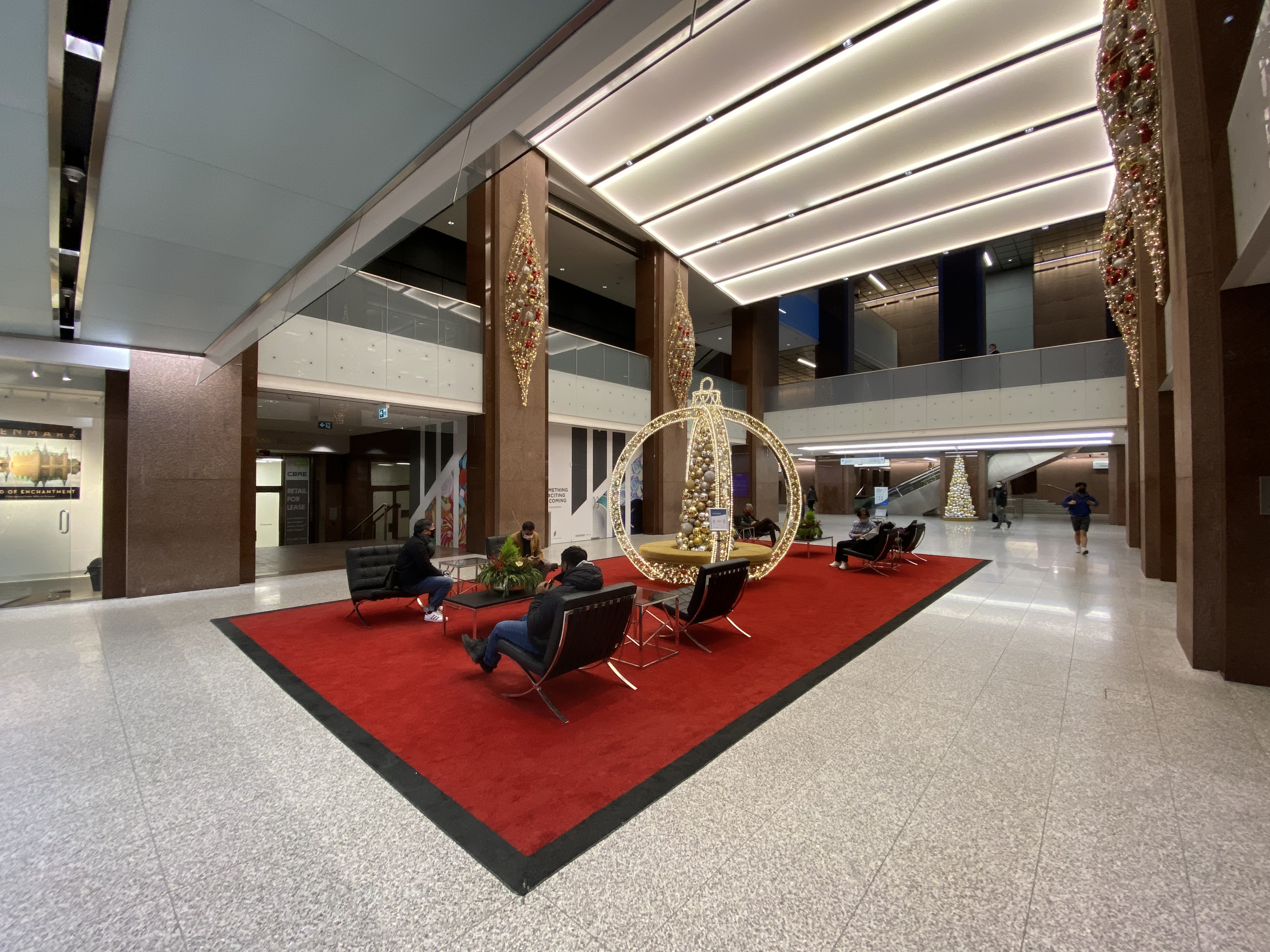
Basement Arcade existing Void removed after 2017

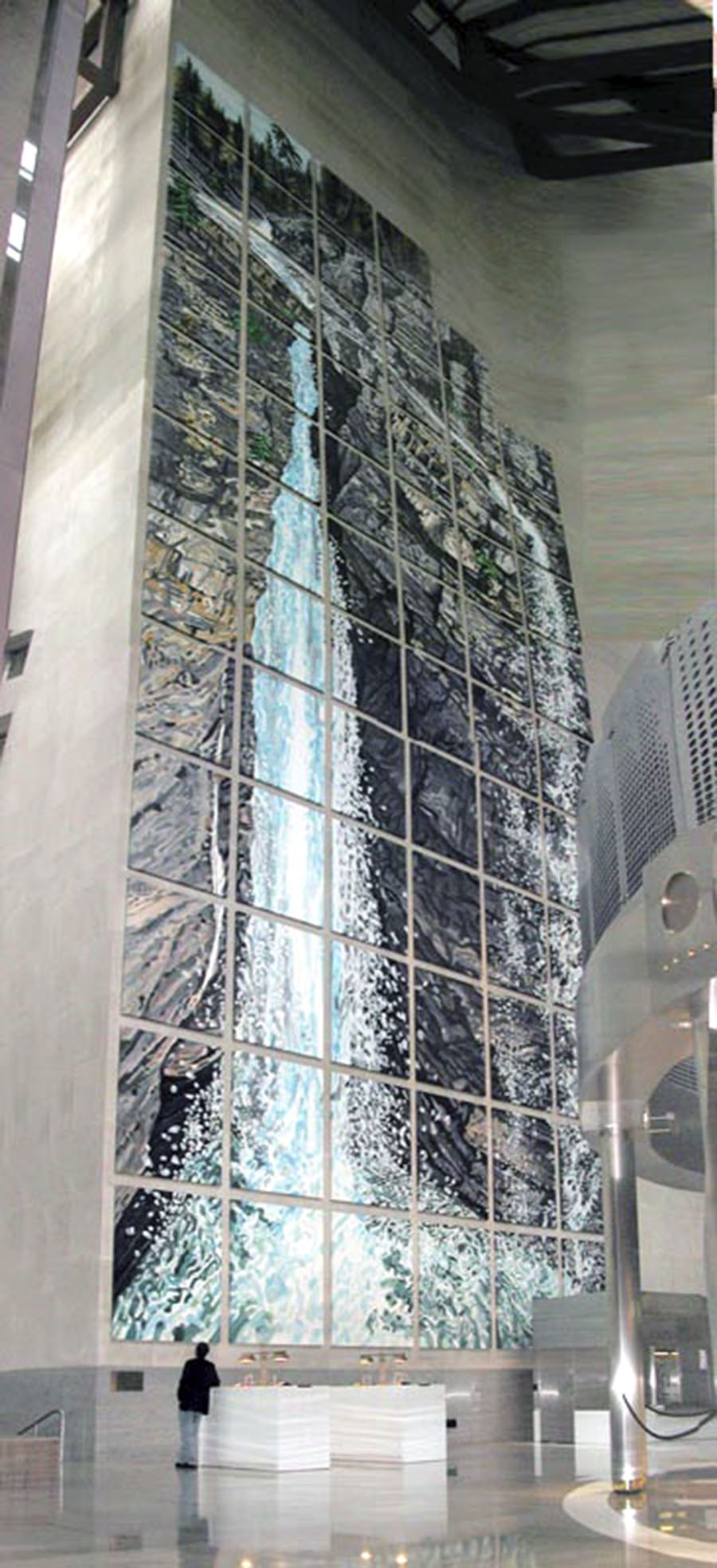
Waterfall (1989), mural by Derek Michael Besant in the lobby

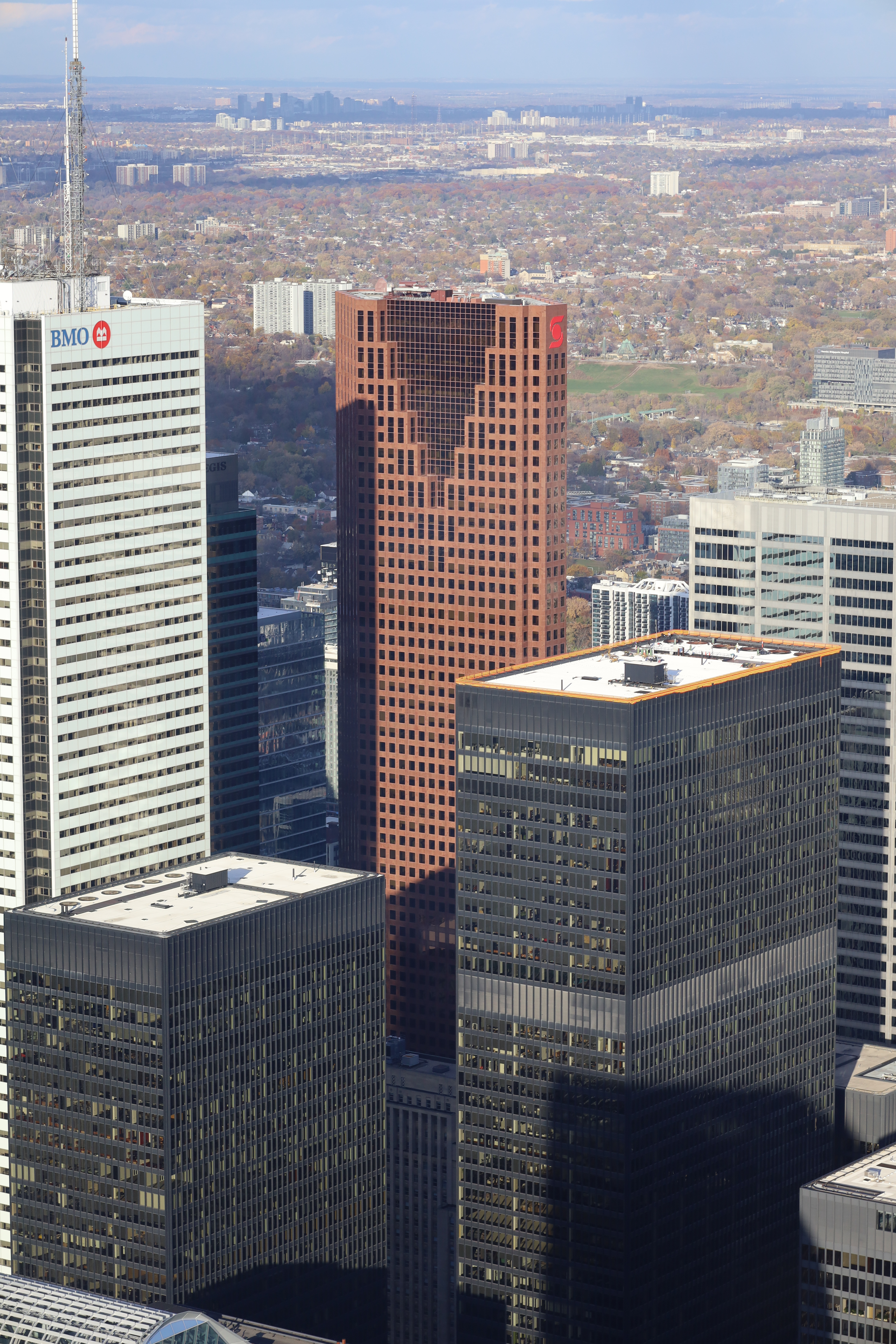
View from the CN Tower in 2023

== See also ==
- List of tallest buildings in Toronto
- List of tallest buildings in Canada
- Tour Scotia in Montreal
- Scotia Place in Calgary
