= Dream Office Real Estate Investment Trust =

Canadian investment firm

- Type: Public company
- Traded as: TSX: D.UN; S&P/TSX Composite Component
- Industry: Real estate investing
- Founded: 2003; 23 years ago
- Headquarters: Toronto, Ontario, Canada
- Area served: Canada
- Key people: Michael Cooper
- Website: www.dream.ca/office

Dream Office Real Estate Investment Trust (formerly Dundee REIT) is a Canadian real estate investment trust (REIT).

== History ==
Dundee REIT was formed in 2003, from the commercial properties of Dundee Realty. The remainder of Dundee Realty was taken over by its major shareholder, Dundee Bancorp (now called Dundee Corporation). In 2007, the company sold its Eastern Canadian assets to GE Real Estate for $2.4 billion, while retaining its Western Canadian assets. In 2011, the company bought 29 buildings from Blackstone Real Estate and Slate Properties for $832 million. In January 2012, the company acquired Whiterock REIT, a competing office property REIT, for $582 million. In May 2012, Dundee REIT and H&R REIT bought Scotia Plaza for $1.3 billion, the highest price ever paid for a Canadian office building.

In 2012, the company spun-off its industrial properties into a new company, Dundee Industrial REIT (later renamed Dream Industrial REIT). Dundee Industrial held its $155 million IPO in September 2012. On May 8, 2014 the company was renamed to Dream Office REIT from Dundee REIT.

In 2016, the company took a $749 million writedown, primarily relating to its Alberta office properties. The company had significant exposure to the Alberta market as the result of the 2007 sale of its eastern Canadian properties to GE Capital; at one time, 60% of the company's properties were in Alberta. As a result of its financial problems, the company sold many of its properties in 2016 and 2017. In June 2017, it announced the sale of $1.7 billion worth of properties, including the sale of its remaining stake in Scotia Plaza to KingSett Capital and AIMCo. As of a result of this and other sales, the value of the company's properties decreased by more than half, from $6.1 billion to $2.9 billion.

In February 2018, Dream announced that Michael Cooper, its CEO until 2014, would return as CEO later in the year.

== Properties ==
As at March 31, 2019, Dream Office had 37 properties with a gross leasable area of 7.3 million sf. The majority of the company's properties are located in downtown Toronto, with others located in Calgary, Saskatchewan, and elsewhere in Canada. The company's portfolio consists almost exclusively of office buildings in the central part of cities.

== Corporate structure ==
Dream Office REIT is part of the Dream family of companies, which also include three other Toronto Stock Exchange–listed real estate funds, as well as Dream, Dream Office's asset manager. The Dream name was originally an acronym for Dundee Real Estate Asset Management. Dundee Corporation is a significant shareholder in Dream, but not in Dream Office REIT.
