= H&R REIT =

Canadian investment firm

H&R Real Estate Investment Trust
- Type: Public
- Traded as: TSX: HR.UN; S&P/TSX Composite Component
- Industry: REIT - Commercial
- Founded: 1996
- Founder: Thomas J. Hofstedter
- Headquarters: Toronto, Ontario, Canada
- Key people: Thomas J. Hofstedter (President and Chief executive officer)
- Website: http://www.hr-reit.com

H&R Real Estate Investment Trust is a Canadian open-ended real estate investment trust, specializing in commercial real estate, and based in Toronto, Ontario. It is the eighth largest REIT in Canada by market capitalization, following its 2021 strategic review, which included the sale of its Bow office tower and spin-off of Primaris REIT (enclosed malls). H&R's portfolio spans 25.6 million sq.ft., 70% by value located in the United States and 49% focused on multi-residential properties, with the remainder including 18% industrial and a mix of non-core office, retail and refining properties. Its portfolio has a total value of $9.2 billion. It is listed on the Toronto Stock Exchange.

== History ==
H&R was founded in 1996 by Thomas J. Hofstedter, through a $173 million IPO on the Toronto Stock Exchange. The original assets of the trust were office buildings owned by Hofstedter's family firm.

In February 2007, H&R agreed to become the developer and owner of The Bow, Encana's new Calgary headquarters complex. It paid $70 million for the land, and Encana signed a 25-year lease. Construction was briefly halted in December 2008 due to a $400 million shortage of financing needed to finish the job. The project continued to move forward, despite the unresolved financing issues. In April 2009, a secondary tower in the project, the 200,000-square-foot (19,000 m^{2}) building planned for a block south of the main tower, was put on hold for at least two years. Construction on the main tower, however, continued, having secured the remaining $475 million required for completion of the structure. H&R had to cut its monthly distribution by half as a result of the financing.

In May 2012, the trust purchased 1/3 of Scotia Plaza, in co-ordination with Dundee REIT, who purchased the other 2/3. The total purchase price was $1.27 billion. In June 2016, H&R sold its stake in Scotia Plaza.

=== Primaris REIT ===
In January 2013, H&R offered to purchase Primaris REIT, a Canadian REIT primarily owning enclosed shopping malls, for $2.7 billion, or $27.5 a share. Primaris had previously received a hostile takeover offer led by KingSett Capital for $26 a share. Primaris, originally called Borealis Retail REIT, had been founded through a spin-off of several retail properties owned by the Ontario Municipal Employees System (rebranded as OMERS) in 2003. It owned 43 enclosed shopping malls at the time of the proposed acquisition, while H&R primarily owned office buildings and power centres. H&R and KingSett eventually agreed to split Primaris between them, with H&R getting approximately 25 properties worth $3.1 billion and rights to the Primaris name, while the KingSett group received 18 properties worth $1.8 billion. With the reduced deal, H&R failed to become the largest Canadian REIT, as it would have been under the initial deal.

As part of a broader restructuring initiative at H&R in 2021, Primaris REIT was spun-off as a stand-alone REIT effective December 31, 2021. Concurrent with the spin-out, Primaris acquired six shopping centres from Healthcare of Ontario Pension Plan for $800 million, with the pension plan receiving approximately 26 million units of Primaris REIT, making it the largest unitholder.

In June 2023, Primaris announced its first acquisition after the spin-out, acquiring Conestoga Mall in Waterloo, Ontario for $270 million from Ivanhoe Cambridge, with the vendor receiving units in Primaris as partial consideration.

In November 2023, Primaris REIT acquired Halifax Shopping Centre for $370 million.

In September 2024 Primaris REIT announced its acquisition of les Galeries de la Capitale in Quebec City for $325 million, bringing total mall acquisitions since 2021 to $1.76 billion. The acquisition closed October 1, 2024, and on October 2 Primaris announced a $75 million bought deal equity offering of the units that were contractually due as consideration for the acquisition, monetizing the vendor's ownership in the REIT. The offering was Primaris' first public equity offering since the spin-off.

On January 31, 2025 Primaris REIT acquired a 50% interest in Edmonton's Southgate Centre and a 100% interest in Oshawa Centre, in the eastern GTA for $585 million. It also highlighted a number of dispositions, as the REIT recycled capital from lower productivity malls into top tier malls.

On June 17, 2025 Primaris acquired Lime Ridge Mall in Hamilton, Ontario for $416 million. The acquisition marked $1 billion of acquisitions in 2025, $2 billion of acquisitions since 2023, and $2.8 billion of acquisitions since the spin-off at the end of 2021.

On October 10, 2025 Primaris acquired Promenades St. Bruno in Montreal's south shore for $565 million, bringing 2025 acquisitions to almost $1.6 billion, and total acquisitions since 2021 to over $3.3 billion.

=== Recent history ===
In December 2014, the company sold 50% ownership in a portfolio of industrial properties for $731 million. In November 2017, the company announced that it planned to sell 91 of its US retail and industrial properties, for a total of US$895 million. Money from the sales would go in part to buy US residential properties. In recent years, the company has experienced poor financial results, due in part to the closures of Target Canada and Sears Canada.

== Properties ==
H&R has a diversified portfolio of properties. Multi-residential properties accounted for 23% of its portfolio, up from 1% in 2014. Over the same period, retail decreased from 39% to 28%, office decreased from 51% to 41%, and industrial has remained at approximately 8%. United States market exposure increased to 42%, up from 23% in 2014. Canadian markets declined from 77% to 58%, with Ontario accounting for 28% as of 2019.

Prominent office properties owned by H&R include The Bow (Calgary), the TransCanada Tower (Calgary), the Atrium (Toronto), and Hess Tower (Houston). Corus Quay was sold to George Brown College and Halmont Properties Corp. in 2023.

Most of H&R's Canadian retail properties are in its Primaris subsidiary. Notable malls owned by Primaris include Sunridge Mall (Calgary), Orchard Park (Kelowna), Place D'Orleans (Ottawa), Dufferin Mall (Toronto), Lansdowne Place (Peterborough), Cataraqui Centre (Kingston), Place du Royaume (Chicoutimi), Stone Road Mall (Guelph), Medicine Hat Mall (Medicine Hat), Park Place Mall (Lethbridge), Kildonan Place (Winnipeg), Sherwood Park Mall (Sherwood Park), Grant Park Shopping Centre (Winnipeg), and St. Albert Centre (St. Albert).

H&R also owns multi-family residential properties, primarily in the southern US, and partially under its Lantower Residential subsidiary.
