= WZMH Architects =

Architectural firm in Toronto

WZMH Architects is an architectural firm established in 1961 and based in Toronto, Ontario, Canada. Originally known as Webb Zerafa Menkès Housden (after Peter Webb, Boris Zerafa, René Menkès, and Warwick Housden) the company's name was changed to WZMH Architects in 2002.

The firm is known for its work with tall, landmark structures (including the CN Tower), skyscrapers, major mixed-use development, commercial, institutional, residential and hospitality projects, as well as renovation and retrofit projects involving heritage restoration, justice buildings and data centres. In 2015, WZMH merged with retail design firm, pellow + associates.

The company working with Ryerson University (now Toronto Metropolitan University), has devised a concept for providing supplemental energy to buildings that are linked to a microgrid that would draw that energy captured from the testing of nearby data centre generators. The company has come up with a concept to harness “wasted energy” from data centres by diverting it to residences and commercial buildings that are located near the data centre to form a direct current microgrid-based community.

The next company's project with Ryerson University, The Ryerson University Smart Campus Integration and Testing Hub (SCITHub) aims to be “100 percent digitally enabled”.

== Awards ==
Illuminating Engineering Society of North America:

2015: IES Illumination Award of Merit - Quinte Courthouse

International Council of Shopping Centre Awards:

2015: Gold ICSC within the New Development Category - Outlet Collection at Niagara and RBC WaterPark Place in Toronto

Canadian Urban Institute:

2013: CUI Brownie Award in the Excellence in Project Development at the Building Scale category – Nova Scotia Power Corporate Headquarters

Canada Green Building Council:

2013: Canadian Green Building Award- Nova Scotia Power Corporate Headquarters

=== Ontario Architect's Association Awards ===
2014: OAA Design Excellence Award- Nova Scotia Power Corporate Headquarters

2012: OAA Award for Design Excellence- Bay Adelaide Centre West Tower

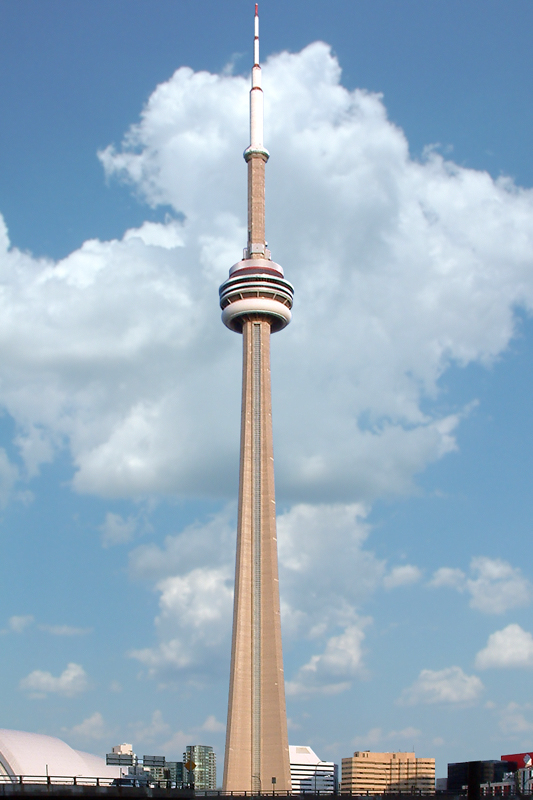
CN Tower

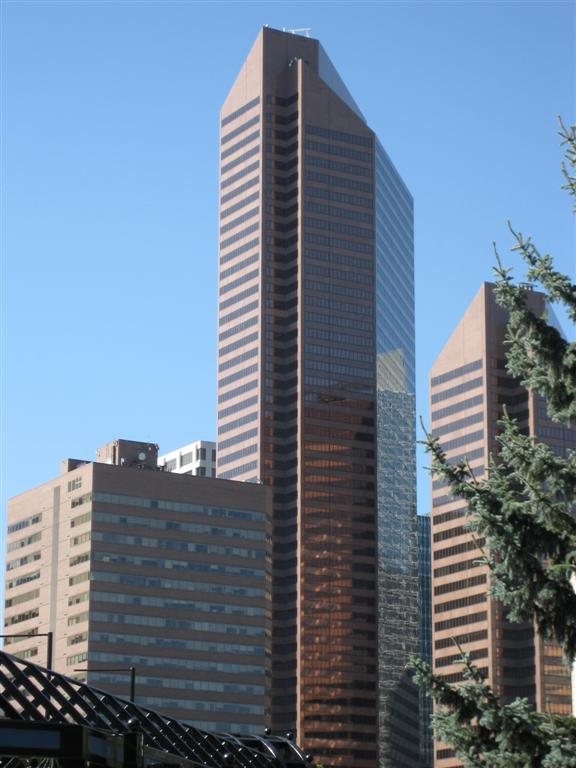
Petro-Canada Centre

== Gallery ==
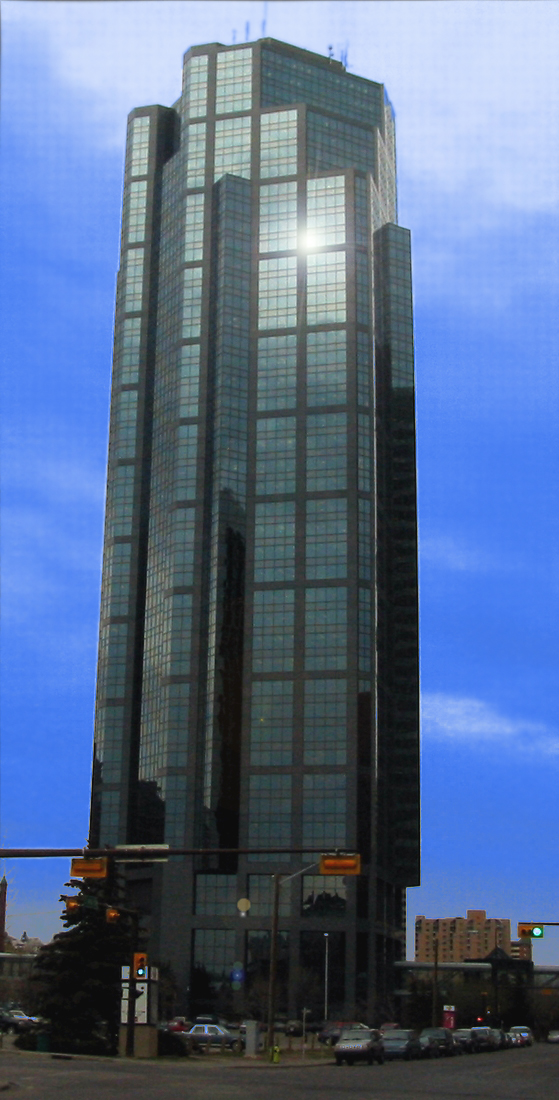
Canterra Tower

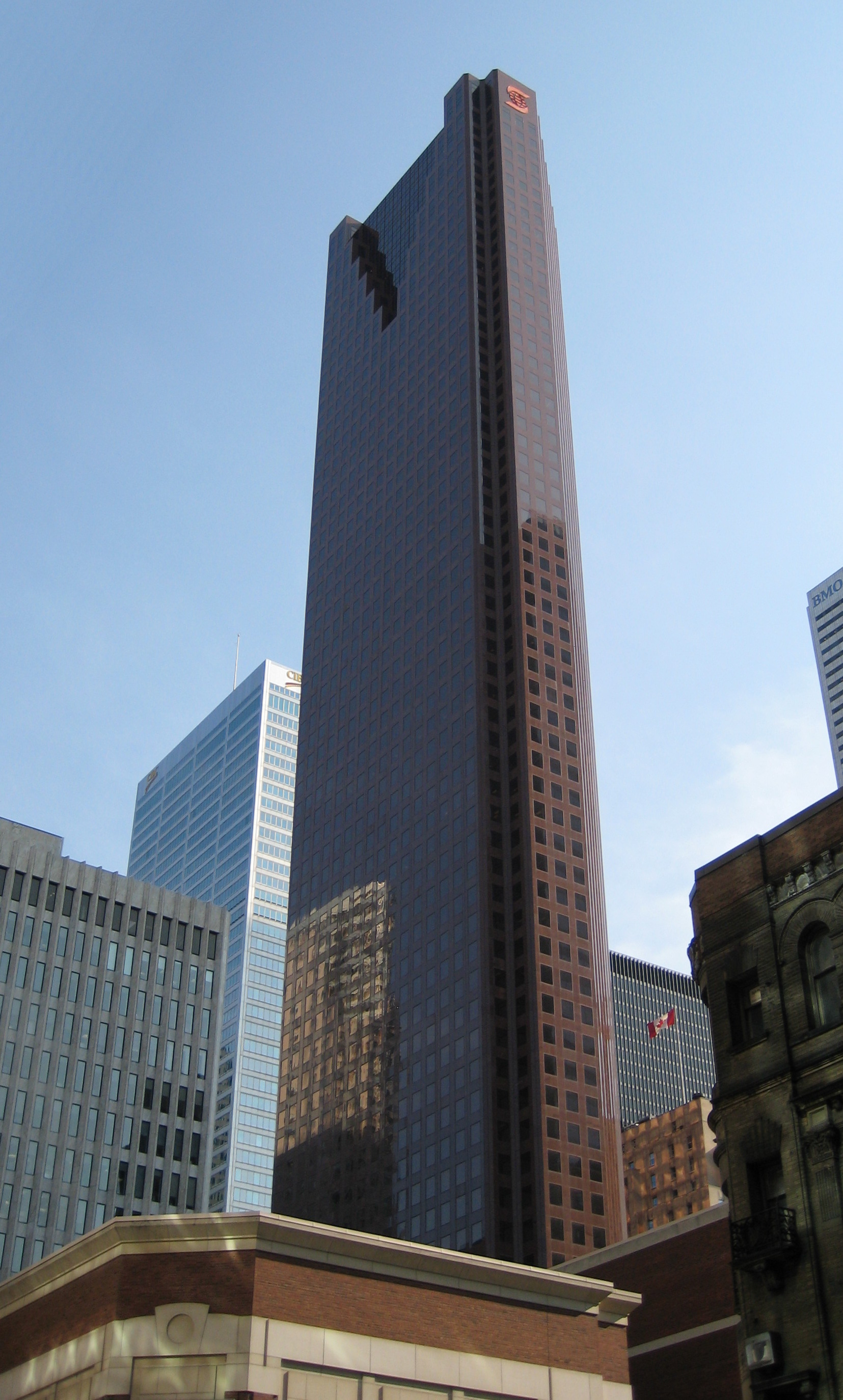
Scotia Plaza

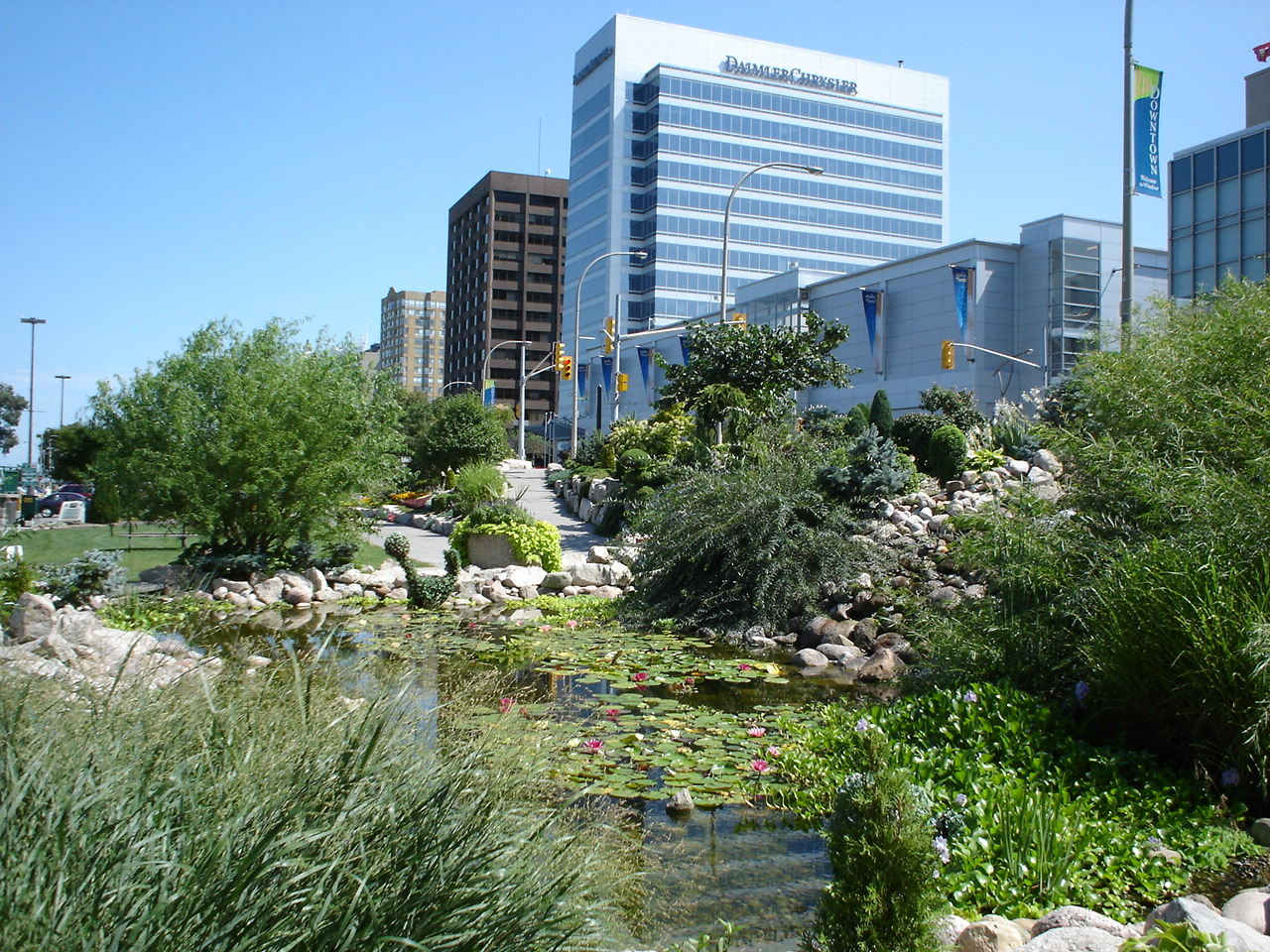
DaimlerChrysler Tower

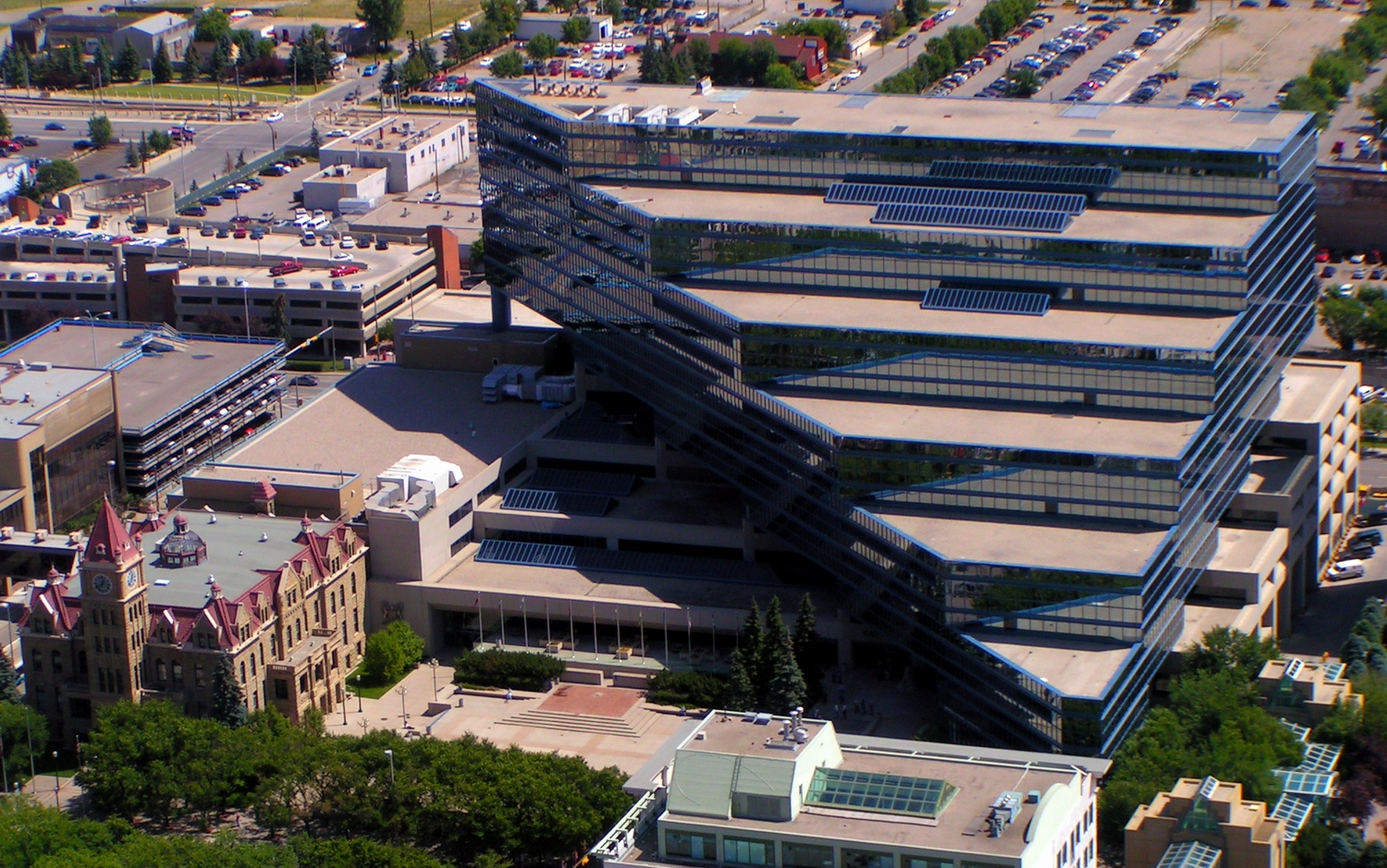
Calgary Municipal Building

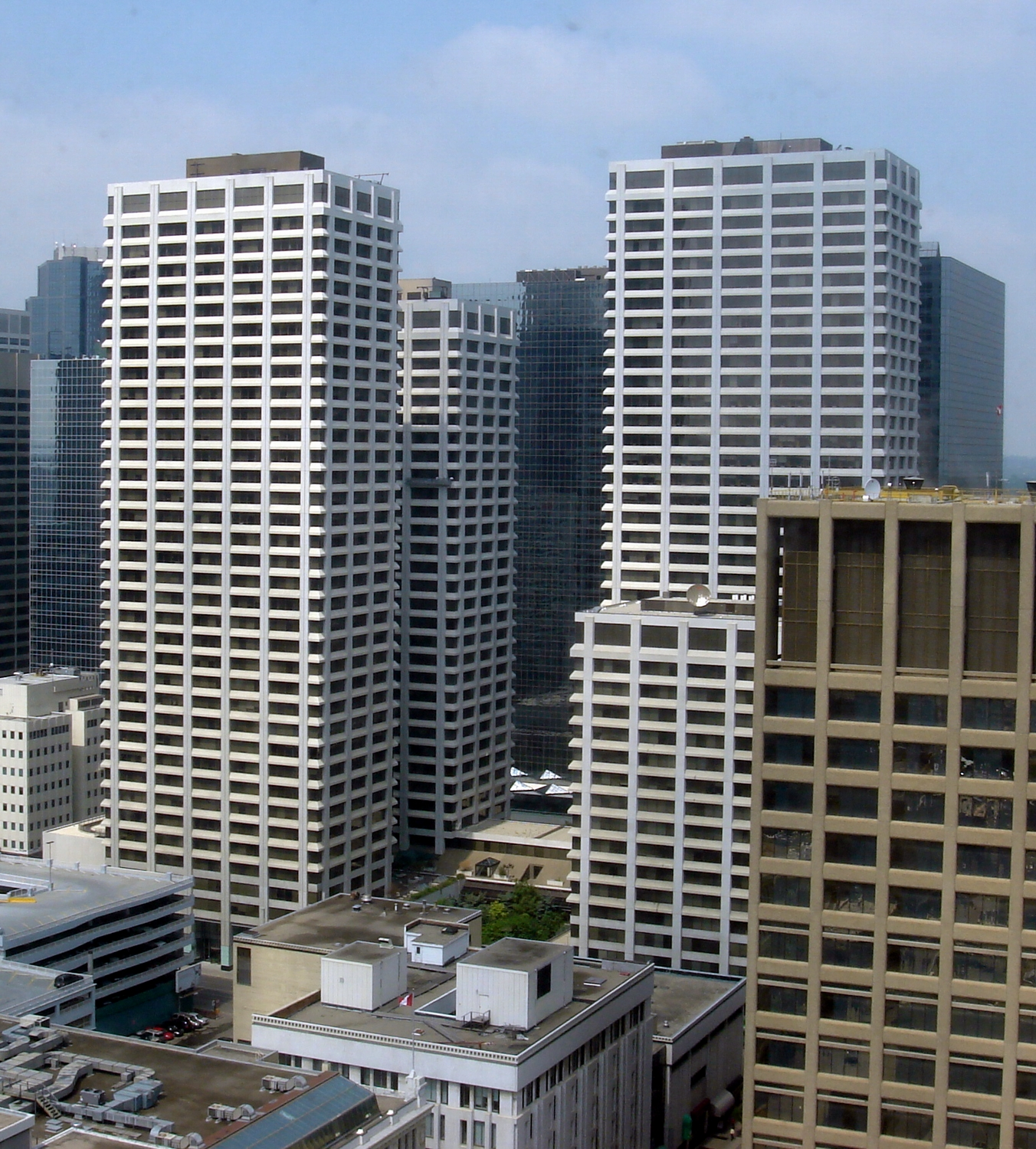
Bow Valley Square

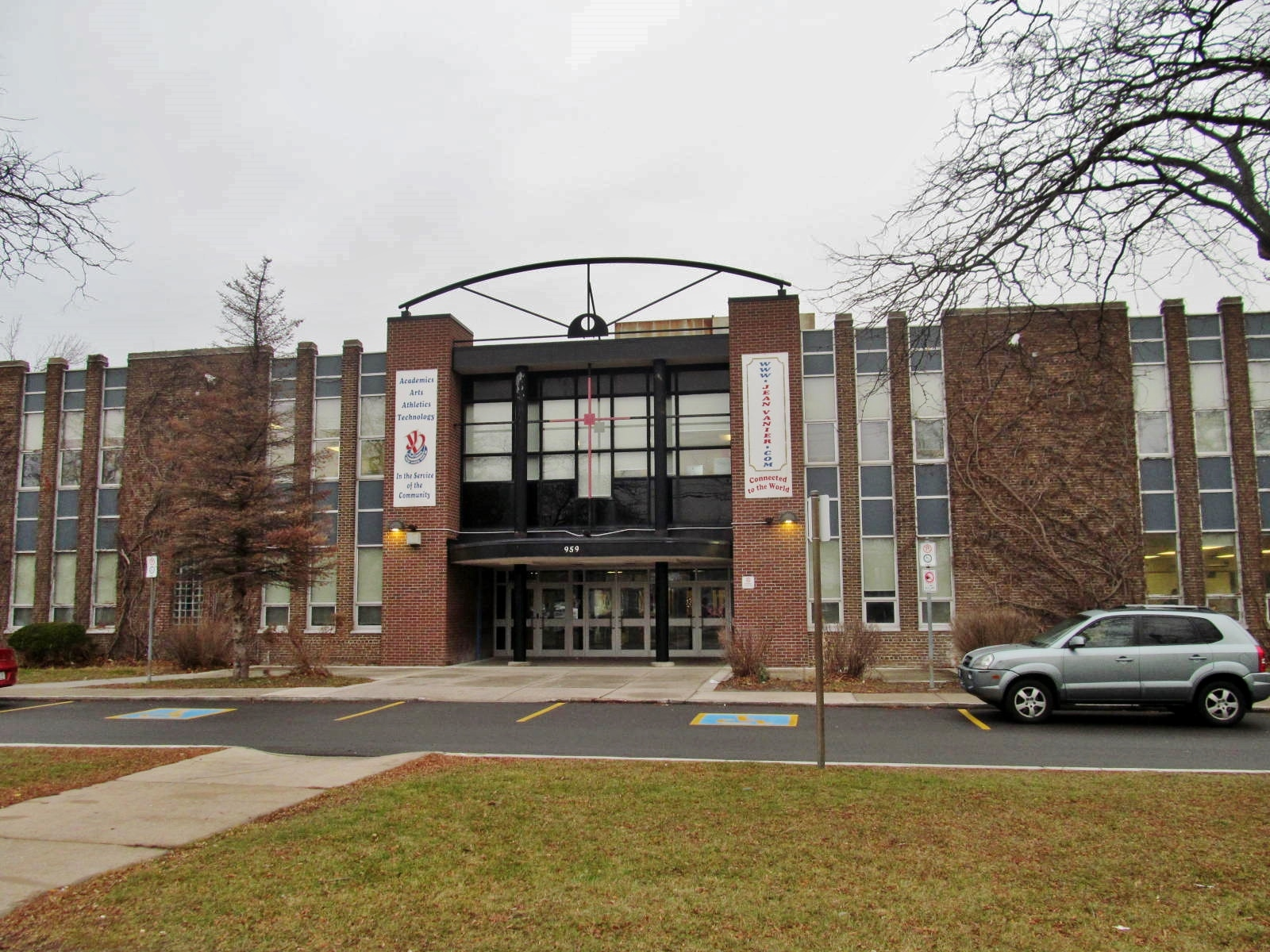
Tabor Park Vocational School, Scarborough, Ontario
(Toronto District School Board)

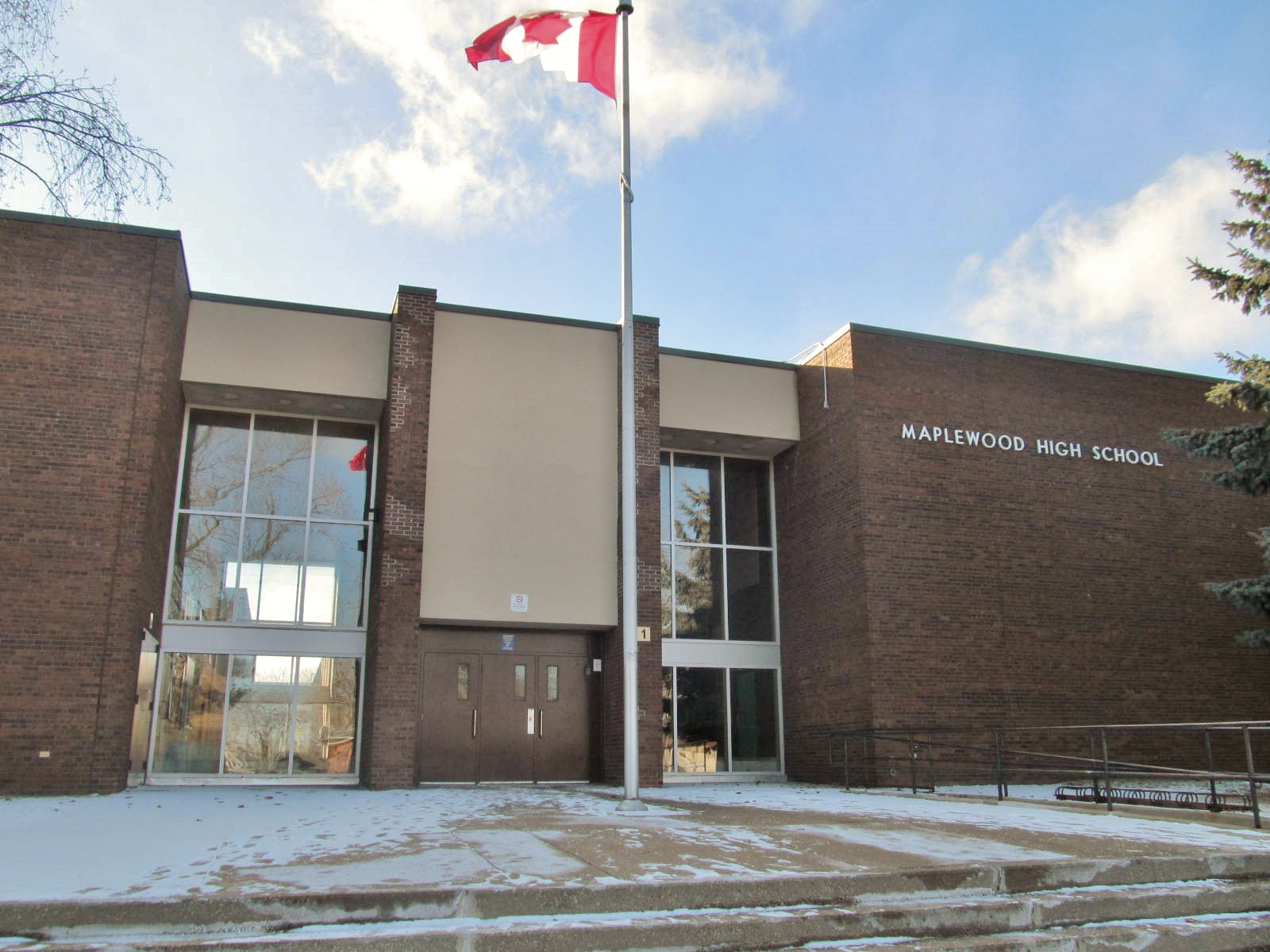
Maplewood Vocational School, Scarborough, Ontario
(Toronto District School Board)

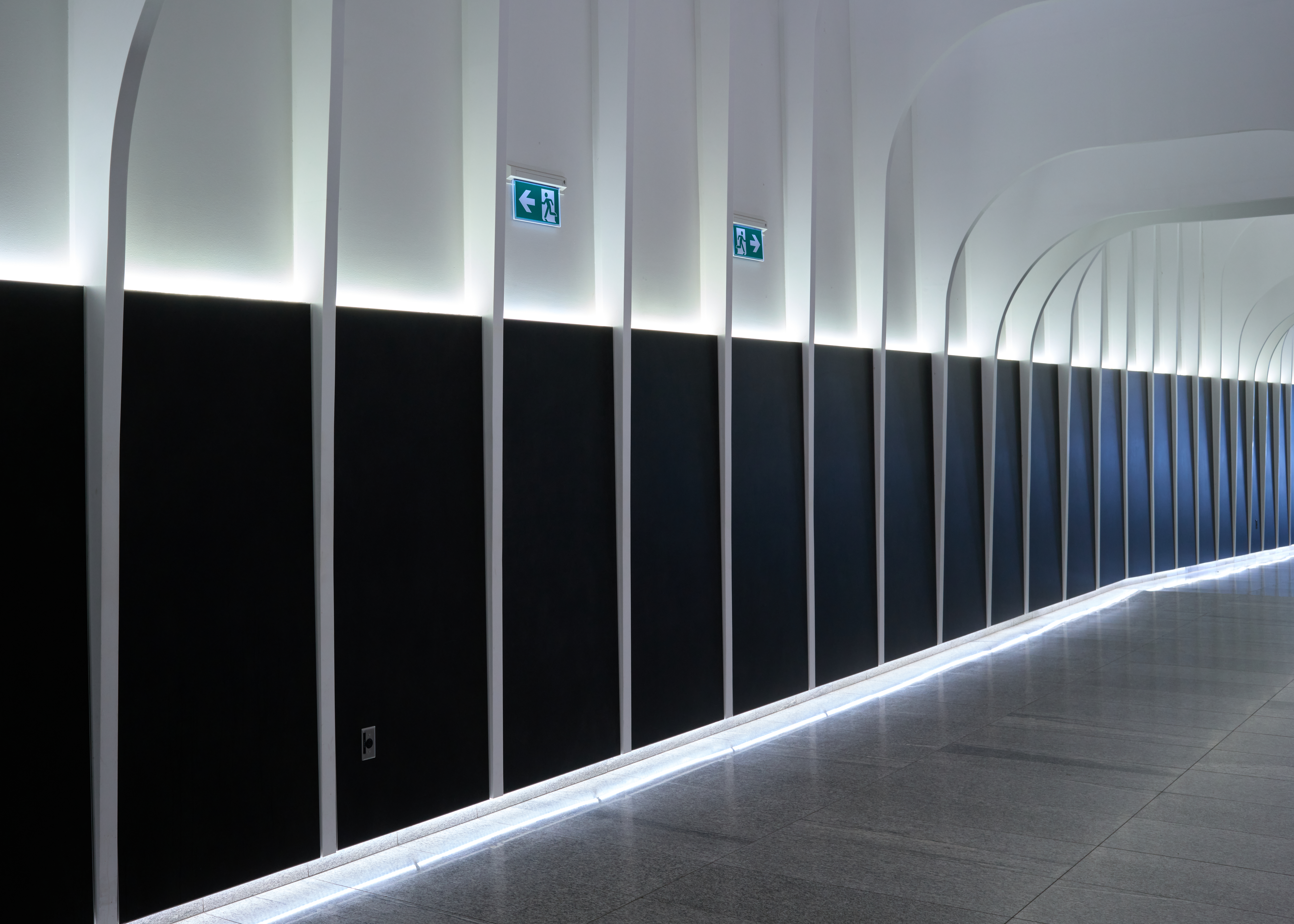
Arches in the entrance corridor of 33 Bloor East in downtown Toronto
