= Maxim Olshevsky =

Canadian real estate developer

Maxim Olshevsky is a Canadian real estate developer known for adaptive reuse and office-to-residential conversions. He is managing director of Astra Group and PeopleFirst Developments in Calgary, Canada which have played a role in transforming vacant office spaces into residential and mixed-use developments as part of Calgary's Downtown Development Incentive Program.

== Biography ==
Olshevsky immigrated from Ukraine to Calgary, Canada with his family when he was 13. He grew up in the west side of Calgary in a two-bedroom apartment with his parents and a little sister while adapting to life in Canada and slept on the couch.

At the age of 16, Olshevsky began working as a construction labourer, gaining hands-on experience across multiple trades while quickly learning English. He launched his first company when he was 18, initially focused on framing, selling it in his mid 20s. He has stated his motivation was to build the kind of homes he wished his family had when he they first moved to Canada.

In 2014, he founded Astra Group, originally focused on foreclosed and condemned buildings. After Calgary announced that it would institute an incentive program for developers tackling office-to-residential conversions, Olshevsky completely pivoted to focus his companies to specialize in turning abandoned office towers into housing.

In 2021, Olshevsky's Peoplefirst Developments, a subsidiary of Astra Group, became the first company to complete a project under Calgary's incentive program for office-to-residential conversions. They began redeveloping on the vacant former SNC-Lavalin building in 2022. After he completed acquisition of the building in February 2022, he obtained building permits within two months and started construction in eight months. $7.8 million of the project's $38 million budget came from Calgary's incentive program.

Following the onset of the war in Ukraine in 2022, Olshevsky participated in efforts to integrate Ukrainians refugees in Canada.

In 2024, the redevelopment resulted in converting the 129,000-square-foot tower into the 112-apartment complex known as The Cornerstone. The project included 40% of units priced at below market rates which the company stated would continue with future projects, and there was a waiting list of potential renters for the building.

Following Cornerstone, the company acquired Petro Fina and Place 800, both slated for office-to-residential redevelopment. It started Petro Fina as its second conversion in 2023. The Petrofina Building conversion was completed in October 2025.

== Notable projects ==
Building	Address	Year	Notes
The Cornerstone	909 5 Ave SW	Completed 2023	Former SNC-Lavalin office tower, converted into 112 residential units and a coworking space for beauty professionals
Petrofina Building	736 8 Avenue SW	Completed 2025	Former Petrofina office tower, converted into 103 residential units
Place 800	800 6 Ave SW	Expected 2026	Office tower being converted into 203 residential units with connection to Calgary's Plus 15 network.

== Recognition ==
- Calgary's Top 40 Under 40 2023
- EY Entrepreneur of the Year Prairies Finalist 2023
- Business in Calgary Leaders Award 2022
