= Walter Dexter (Canadian artist) =

Canadian ceramicist (1931-2015)

- Born: Walter Gibson Dexter; October 3, 1931; Calgary, Alberta, Canada
- Died: June 2, 2015 (aged 83)
- Known for: ceramicist, educator, administrator

Walter Gibson Dexter RCA (October 3, 1931 – June 2, 2015) was a Canadian ceramist, potter and teacher.

== Art education ==
At an early age Dexter was drawn to art. His family encourage his interest in drawing cartoons. After completing high school he attend the Alberta Institute of Technology and Art commercial art diploma program. Under the tutelage one of his instructors, Luke Lindoe, Dexter became interested in ceramics. He went on to receive the Diploma in Ceramics from the then Alberta College of Art in 1954. Lindoe continued to be a mentor to Dexter long after he completed his studies. His efforts in seeking to enter a Masters program or find a position teaching pottery did not come to fruition. However, he was offered a scholarship by the University of Manitoba to attend the Swedish School of Arts and Crafts in Stockholm where he continued his studies of ceramics. He had a two-year sojourn in Europe after he finished his course in Stockholm. He lived in England but traveled extensively. His former teacher and mentor, Luke Lindoe offered Dexter a studio position so he was convinced to return to Calgary. He worked in Lindoe's studio for two years then worked in a ceramics manufacturing firm in Medicine Hat as a designer and manager but left that employment. He had a studio in Kelowna from 1963 to 1967. He engaged in production pottery and renewed his experimental work with Raku. During this time he also developed his art repertoire creating coppered bowls and plates. In 1970 he studied at the University of British Columbia.

== Work ==
Dexter's work falls into three main categories that correspond to the phases of his artistic development, Raku, Stoneware, and Figurative vases.

=== Raku developments ===
By 1957, he was experimenting with the Japanese ceramic Raku process. He was a pioneer in introducing this process to Canada. By the early 1970s Dexter had discovered contemporary Raku technologies. When American ceramists Paul Soldner and Hal Reigger were in Nelson he attended their workshops. Based on his own experimentation and learned techniques he became known for his raku ceramic works.

=== Stoneware production ===
He also produced high-quality stoneware. He has produced this type of work throughout his career. Dexter's decorated plates are designed for wall mounting. His most common subject matter depicts running or leaping nude female figures displaying various gestures. These decorative plates express a representational aspect usually associated with drawing and painting.

=== Torso vases ===
Between 1995 and 2012 Dexter produced a body of artistic pottery work referred to as the "Torso Vases". The name arises from the shape of the pieces, resembling a headless torso. This colourful abstract figurative work has been widely acclaimed and written about. His sketch books for the torso vases reveal the essence of the development of these forms. Vessels and plate forms make up a substantial part of his work. These pieces are often decorated with dancing figures. He was drawn to this motif by his study and collaboration with the American ceramist Paul Soldner.

== Selected collections ==
Dexter's works are held in the following public collections;

- Claridge Collection, Montreal, Quebec
- Canada Council Art Bank, Ottawa Ontario
- Canadian Clay and Glass Gallery, Waterloo, Ontario
- Canadian Museum of Civilization, Gatineau, Quebec;
- Confederation Centre Art Gallery and Museum, Charlottetown, Prince Edward Island
- University of Calgary, Calgary, Alberta
- Burlington Art Gallery, Burlington, Ontario
- Alberta Foundation of the Arts, Alberta
- Winnipeg Art Gallery, Manitoba

== Honours and awards ==
- Silver Medal, International Ceramics Exhibition, Prague, 1962
- Outstanding Stoneware Award, National Biennial of Ceramics, Trois Riviers, Quebec, 1963
- Saidye Bronfman Award, Canada Council, Ottawa, 1992
- Member, Royal Canadian Academy of Arts

== Commissions ==
Dexter created a raku Donors' Wall for the Saanich Peninsula Municipal Hospital in Victoria, a major public commission in British Columbia.

== Academic positions ==
Dexter was a pottery instructor at a number of academic institutions in Western Canada between 1960 and 1974. From 1967 until 1974 head of Ceramics at the Kootenay School of Arts in Nelson, British Columbia. The other positions that he held were;

- Instructor, Vancouver Community College, Vancouver, British Columbia,
- Instructor, Emily Carr College of Art,
- Instructor, University of Saskatchewan at Saskatoon, Saskatchewan,
- Summer Instructor, University of Victoria, Victoria, British Columbia.

== Publications ==
=== By Dexter ===
Murray, Rona and Dexter, Walter; The Art of the Earth, an historical, literary and philosophical compilation of extracts and illustrations on clay-working, Sono Nis Press, December 1979, ISBN 0919462863 and ISBN 978-0919462861, Paperback, 116 pages.

=== About Dexter ===
- Amy Gogarty, Book Review - Walter Dexter by Jonathon Bancroft-Snell in BC Potters Newsletter, 4 May 2102 at p. 11
- Gloria Hickey, Book Review - Walter Dexter by Jonathon Bancroft-Snell
- Walter Dexter: the torso masterworks by Jonathon Bancroft-Snell, Studio Artist Series No.1, Toronto, Ronald P. Frey + Co., 2012, ISBN 978-1-77081-106-5, 190 pages, Publication announcement.
- Walter Dexter - Three Sketchbooks edited by Jonathon Bancroft-Snell, Limited edition of 50, including 5 numbered and signed prints, Toronto, Ronald P. Frey + Co., 2012, ISBN 978-1-77-081-110-2, 134 pages, Publication Information
- Walter Dexter by Brian Gibson in Ceramic Art 2009
- Walter Dexter by Brian Gibson in Ceramics Monthly December 2008

== Administrative positions ==
Walter Dexter has held a variety of executive positions in arts organizations. In 1978, he was the president of the Craftsmen's Association of British Columbia and a director of the Canadian Crafts Council. He has also served as President and Vice-President of Ceramists Canada.

== Selected exhibitions ==
Walter Dexter has had exhibitions and shows across Canada as well as in Belgium, Czechoslovakia, England, Finland, Italy, Japan and, the United States. The following are selected exhibitions and shows.

=== Solo exhibitions ===
- Walter Dexter: Surface and Sculpture Art Gallery of Greater Victoria, Victoria, British Columbia 1995.
- Tribute was a retrospective exhibition (2007) focusing primarily on Walter's the Torso vases that were the primary focus of the book Walter Dexter published in 2012.

=== Group exhibitions ===
- International Ceramics Exhibition, Prague, Czechoslovakia (1962)
- Abstracts at Home II (2012) featuring Painters Eleven artist William Ronald and Walter Dexter, Jonathon Bancroft-Snell Gallery, London, Ontario

== Personal life ==
After his first marriage ended in divorce Dexter moved to British Columbia to take up a teaching position in Nelson. While living in Nelson, he met Canadian writer and poet Rona Murray. They were married while he was teaching at the Kootenay School of Art. After he left that position they moved to Surrey and then, in 1975, to Metchosin on Vancouver Island. There they became part of the arts community. Since the death of his spouse he has lived in Victoria, British Columbia. He continued to work in his studio and participate in the arts community. Walter Dexter RCA died on June 2, 2015, at the age of 83 in Victoria, British Columbia.

== See also ==
- Canadian art
- List of Canadian artists
