= Petrofina Building =

Building in Calgary, Alberta

Coordinates: 51.0463°N 114.0783°W

The Petrofina Building, also known as the Fina Building or Petro Fina Building, is an 11-story structure located at 736 8 Avenue SW in downtown Calgary, Alberta. Completed in 1960, was originally constructed as an office tower for the Antwerp-based Petrofina which utilized it as the Calgary headquarters for its Canadian subsidiary, Canadian Fina Oil Limited. It continued to be used as an office tower until the early 2020s but began suffering from vacancy issues. In 2025, it was converted into a residential building with 103 units.

== History ==
In late May 1950, the Belgian oil company Petrofina opened a Canadian subsidiary, Canadian Fina Oil Limited, in Calgary. In 1953, Petrofina created another Canadian subsidiary, Canadian Petrofina Limited, for financing and marketing in Eastern Canada.

On July 15, 1959, Petrofina announced plans to construct the building, a 20-story tower, with financing of $5 million having been secured. It was planned to be "one of the finest buildings on the North American continent." Construction of the Petrofina Building began with a sod-turning ceremony on August 3, 1959. The $4.5 million project was designed by the architectural firm Rule Wynn and Rule in the Art Moderne style, featuring elements like chevron stone panels between windows, verde issorie marble and red sienna granite cladding on the ground floor, and a set-back executive penthouse with an observation gallery and deck. The design incorporated a folded-plate porte cochère at the entrance, which was later removed. The building was completed in 1960 and served as the Calgary headquarters for Canadian Fina Oil Limited. Other tenants included various oil companies, oilfield services, and the Belgian Consulate.

The Petrofina Building's construction was one of the key structures built during Calgary's 1958-1960 boom along with Elveden House and a major Firestone plant.

The tower continued to be used by Petrofina Canada until following the acquisition of Petrofina by Petro-Canada, the Canadian government-owned oil company, on February 2, 1981. In 1993, Occidental Petroleum's Canadian unit, CanadianOxy, was reported to have installed a laser-based communication system which 4mbps of data to be transferred between its Petrofina office and a nearby office. It continued to be an office tower until it began experiencing high vacancy rates in the early 2000.

== Conversion to residential housing ==
In April 2023, the City of Calgary approved the building for its Downtown Calgary Development Incentive Program, providing $9.7 million to support conversion from office to residential use after Maxim Olshevsky of Peoplefirst Developments acquired the for $7.2 million property to convert approximately 130,000 square feet of office space into 103 residential units with retail and amenity spaces on the lower floors. A building permit was issued in February 2024, and construction began that year. The project preserved original features like the chevron panels and granite facade while adding modern amenities. The adaptive reuse project was completed in October 2025 marking the sixth office-to-residential conversion completed under the city's incentive program.
