= Former Provincial Museum Building (Edmonton) =

Building in Alberta, Canada

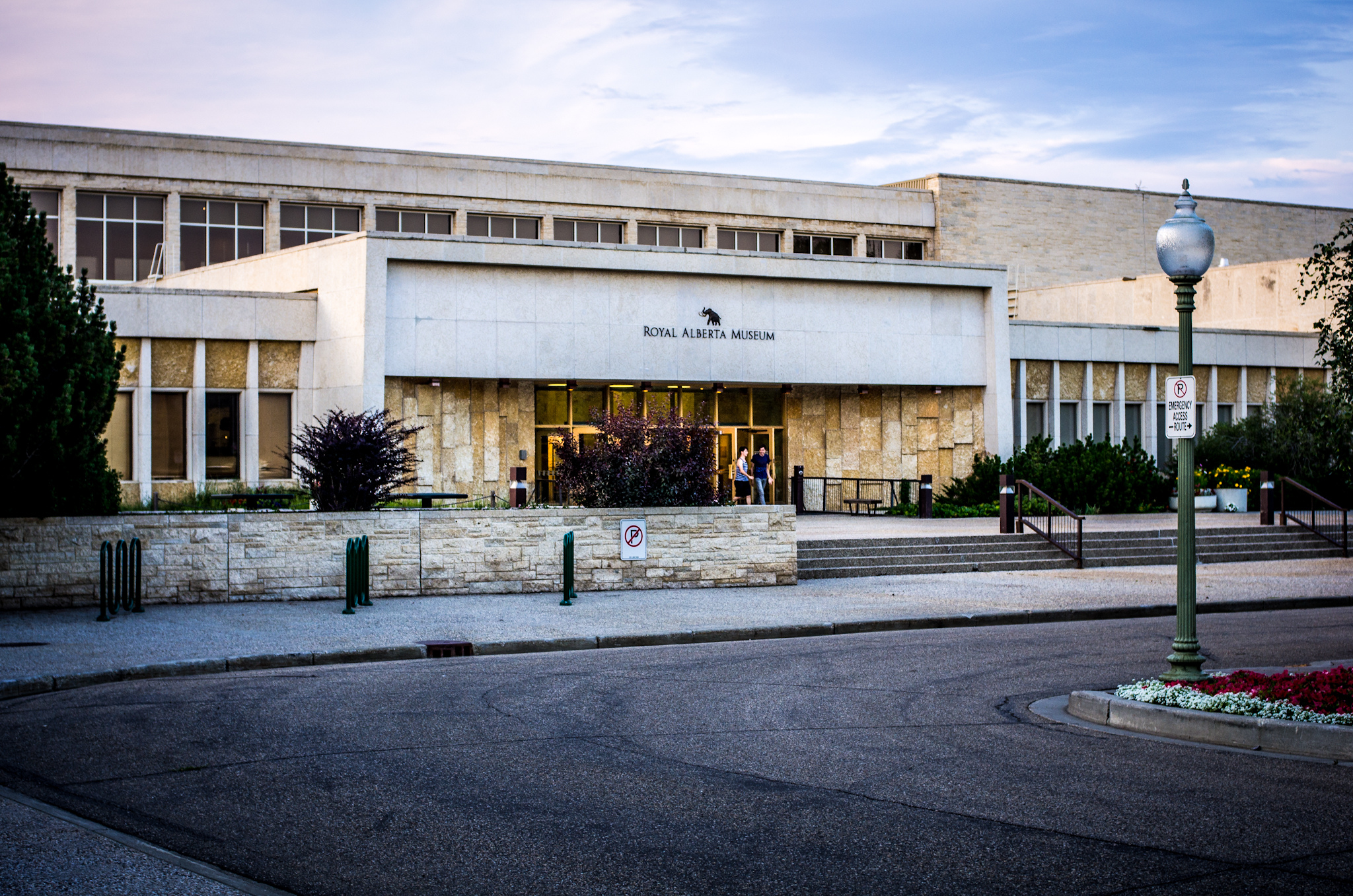
Former Provincial Museum Building pictured in 2012

The former Provincial Museum Building in Glenora, Edmonton is the former home of the Royal Alberta Museum. It was originally constructed December 6, 1967 on the site of the Alberta's Government House to house what was then the Provincial Museum and Archives of Alberta. It continued to house the museum until December 2015 when the museum closed in preparation for its move to its new home in Downtown Edmonton.

== Planning ==
The Canadian Federal Government’s Confederation Memorial Centennial Program and the Government of Alberta began planning for a museum in 1950. In 1962, a local architect, Australian Raymond O. Harrison, was tasked with finding a site to construct and open the Provincial Museum of Alberta with a budget of $5 million and three years. Harrison had previously been involved in the designing the Vancouver Maritime Museum.

Construction began in October 1965 and was completed in May 1967 with a total cost of $8,500,000. It opened on December 6, 1967.

== Site and design ==
The museum, originally the Provincial Museum and Archives of Alberta, was planned to occupy a prominent riverside site adjacent to Edmonton's Government House overlooking the North Saskatchewan River. It was described by the National Trust for Canada as "a stunning example of Midcentury Modern architecture." The building's exterior used Manitoba Tyndall limestone. The exterior was decorated east of the entrance with Indigenous petroglyph motifs designed by Luke Lindoe extending across five grids.

== Replacement and current status ==
In April 2011, it was announced that a new building for the Royal Alberta Museum would be built in Downtown Edmonton on the land formerly occupied by Canada Post's Edmonton station. At the time, Ed Stelmach and the Alberta government said that the old location will be the site for a new residence for the Lieutenant Governor.

After the move, the old building faced demolition with the province announcing plans to open a park on the site in August 2024. However, in November 2024, Reimagine Architects and Beljan Development announced a proposal to repurpose the building as a community hub declaring that they were "dramatically opposed to demolishing this tremendous mid-century modern jewel that carries so much memory."

In July 2025, the demolition was paused as the government of Alberta issued a request for proposals for potential adaptive reuses.
