= Rule Wynn and Rule =

Canadian architectural firm

Rule Wynn and Rule was a Canadian architectural firm that had offices in Calgary and Edmonton. The firm is noted for its prominent role in bringing modern architecture to Alberta.

== History ==
Founded by John Ulric Rule (1904-1978) and Gordon K. Wynn (1910-1994) in Edmonton in 1938, they were joined a year later by Rule's brother, Peter Leitch Rule (1913-1964). The initial partnership came about as neither Rule nor Wynn could find work. All three partners were graduates of the school of architecture at the University of Alberta.

During World War II the Rule brother's father, also named Peter, took charge of the firm. Peter worked as a building inspector for Alberta Government Telephones and during his time with the firm designed several telephone exchange buildings across the province. Although not trained as an architect, in January 1941 he was given a special certificate by the Alberta Association of Architects.

In 1945 the firm opened a second office in Calgary which was headed by Peter Rule (son). This office closed in 1986.

Since 1938, the firm has undergone several name and partner changes including Wynn Forbes Lord Architects (Gordon Wynn, Gordon Forbes and George Lord), Wynn Forbes Lord Feldberg Schmidt Architects (Gordon Wynn, Gordon Forbes, George Lord, Heinz Feldberg and Sig Schmidt), Schmidt Feldberg Croll Henderson Architects (Sig Schmidt, Heinz Feldberg, Norm Croll, Craig Henderson and Eric Underwood), Henderson Inglis Architects (Craig Henderson, Stewart Inglis) and HIP Architects (Craig Henderson, Stewart Inglis, Allan Partridge and Randy Krebes). In 2008, Next Architecture Inc. became a shareholding partner of the firm through Allan Partridge. In 2011, Next Architecture separated from the other partners to avoid an anticipated merger with Kasian. In 2012, on the cusp of its 75 year anniversary, Stewart Inglis and Randy Krebes merged HIP with Kasian Architecture, Planning and Interior Design. In 2024, emeritus partners Craig Henderson and Stewart Inglis signed an attestation along with current partner Allan Partridge to confirm that Next Architecture is a natural successor of the firm Rule Wynn and Rule, established in 1938. As such, Next Architecture is one of the longest continuously operating architectural firms in western Canada.

The records of both the Edmonton and Calgary firms are held at the Canadian Architectural Archives in Calgary.

== Works ==
=== Edmonton Firm ===
Name	City	Address	Year	Status
Foster McGarvey Funeral Home	Edmonton		1938	
Varscona Theatre	Edmonton		1940	Demolished
Westglen High School	Edmonton	10950 127 Street	1940	
Beth Shalom Synagogue	Edmonton	11916 Jasper Avenue	1949	
Denis Yorath House	Edmonton	13110 B Buena Vista Road Northwest	1949	
Ellis Building	Edmonton	10123 112 St NW	1950	
University of Alberta Rutherford Library	Edmonton		1951	
Alberta Government Telephone Building	Edmonton	9718 107 Street Northwest	1953	Superstructure demolished 2021, substructure adaptively re-used 2022.
Eastglen Composite High School	Edmonton	11430 68 Street	1953	
Alberta Motor Association Building	Edmonton	11220 109 Street	1956	
Northwest Utilities Building (now Milner Building)	Edmonton	10040 104 Street	1957	
Royal Alexandra Hospital	Edmonton		1958	
A. S. Hall House	Edmonton		1958	
F. W. Forster House	Edmonton	10240 Kingsway	1958	
Edmonton Club	Edmonton		1959	
Union Oil Company of California Building	Edmonton	114 Avenue	1959	
William Shaw House	Edmonton	62 St Georges Crescent	1963	Demolished
C. J. Varvis House	Edmonton	Laurier Drive	1964	

=== Calgary Firm ===
Name	City	Address	Year	Status
Petroleum Building	Calgary	310 9th Avenue Southwest	1951	Demolished
Harold Carson House	Calgary	3931 Edison Crescent Southwest	1953	Demolished
Pacific Building	Calgary	320 9th Avenue Southwest	1953	Demolished
Spruce Cliff Apartments	Calgary	Hemlock Crescent Southwest	1953	Altered Beyond Recognition
Calgary Trend House	Calgary	730 47th Avenue Southwest	1953	
Anglo-American Building	Calgary	330 9th Avenue Southwest	1954	Demolished
Royalite Oil Building	Calgary	615 2nd Street Southwest	1955	Demolished
Triad Oil Building	Calgary	535 7th Avenue Southwest	1956	
Calgary Petroleum Club	Calgary	319 5th Avenue Southwest	1957	
Petro-Fina Building	Calgary	736 8th Avenue Southwest	1959	Converted to housing
Elveden Centre	Calgary	717 7th Avenue Southwest	1959	
McMahon Stadium	Calgary	1817 Crowchild Trail Northwest	1960	
Imperial Oil Building	Calgary	500 6th Avenue Southwest	1963	Demolished
Holiday Inn	Calgary	708 8th Avenue Southwest	1964	
