= Adaptive reuse =

Reuse of an existing building for a new purpose

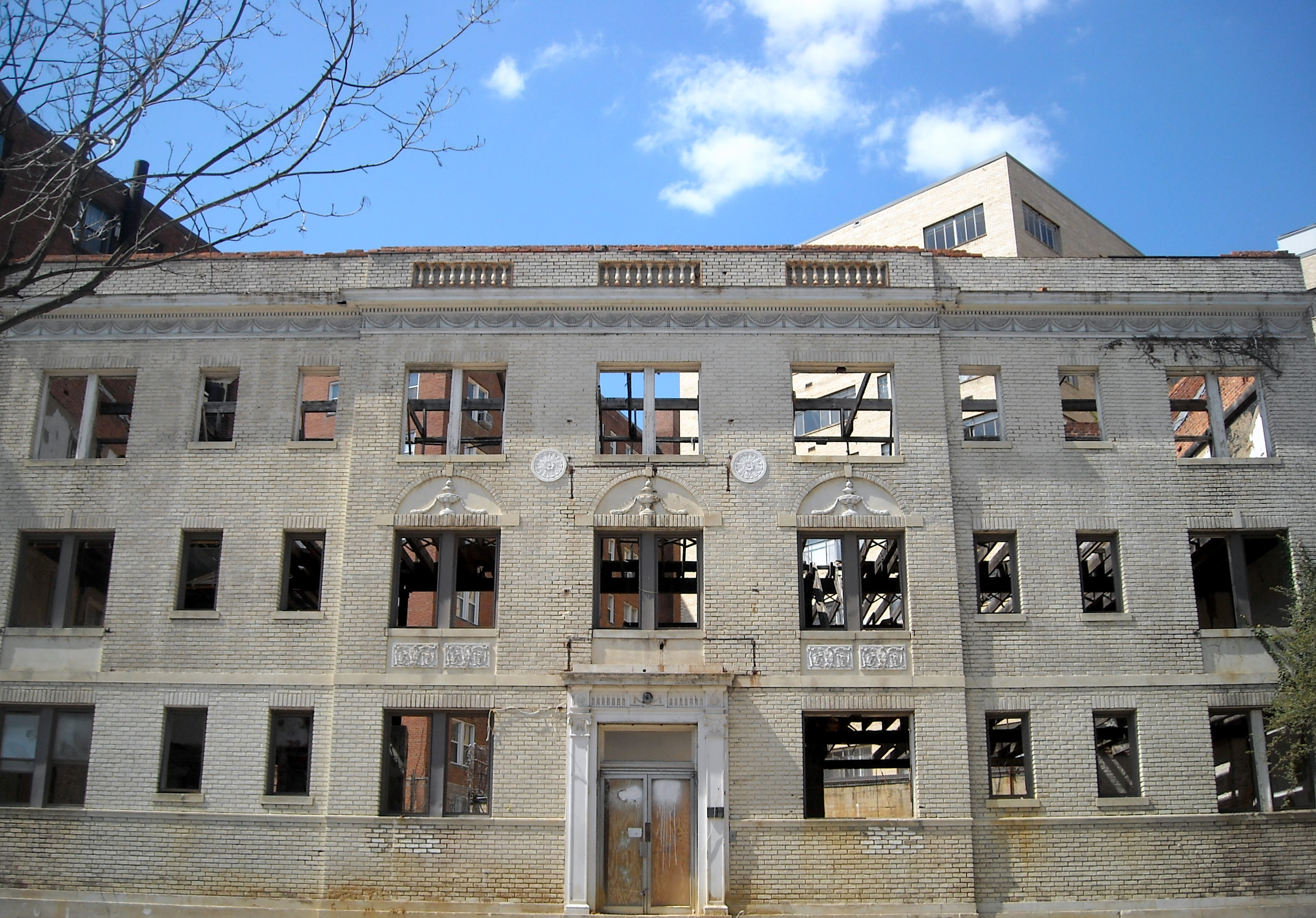
An abandoned building in Washington, D.C. being converted into luxury condominiums.

Adaptive reuse is the reuse (or conversion) of an existing building for a purpose other than that for which it was originally built or designed. The adaptive reuse of buildings can be a viable alternative to new construction in terms of costs, aesthetics, and sustainability among other benefits.

== Definition ==
Adaptive reuse is defined as the aesthetic process that adapts buildings for new uses while retaining their historic features. Using an adaptive reuse model can prolong a building's life, from cradle-to-grave, by retaining all or most of the building system, including the structure, the shell and even the interior materials. This type of revitalization is not restricted to buildings of historic significance and can be a strategy adopted in the case of obsolete buildings.

== Advantages of adaptive reuse ==
Adaptive reuse can have a number of economic, social, cultural and historical, and environmental benefits. The most significant benefits of adaptive reuse of existing buildings include increased economic opportunities, urban regeneration, preserved cultural and historical heritage values, reduced landfill demolition waste, increased energy efficiency, extended building usefulness and cost-effectiveness, enhanced property value, improved life quality, reduced carbon emissions, and lower energy consumption. Some urban planners see adaptive reuse as an effective way of reducing urban sprawl and environmental impact. According to Yung and Chan, "adaptive reuse is a new kind of maintainable rebirth of city, as it covers the building's lifetime and evades destruction waste, encourages recycles of the embodied dynamism and also delivers substantial social and economic profits to the world".

Revitalizing the existing built fabric by finding a new use or purpose for obsolete buildings can be a wonderful resource to a community by "keeping neighborhoods occupied and vital". The reuse of older vacant buildings for other purposes forms a very important aspect of any urban regeneration scheme. Adopting the adaptive reuse approach for the redevelopment of older vacant buildings provides added benefits to the regeneration of an urban area in a sustainable way, through transforming these buildings into usable and accessible units. The adaptive reuse strategy would also enable the local authority and owners of older vacant buildings in urban areas to minimize their economic, social and environmental costs, in a quest for a continued urban expansion and development.

Built heritage conservation through adaptive reuse could therefore be used to promote sustainable historical and cultural development of urban areas. Parameters to prioritise historical buildings for adaptive reuse and the characterisation of adaptive reuse stakeholders are also noted.

- Architectural beauty and cultural heritage: According to Zaitzevsky and Bunnell, old buildings physically link us to our past and become a part of our cultural heritage; they should be preserved because of their "architectural beauty" and the "character and scale they add to the built environment." A majority of historical buildings provide physical links and the progression of cultural evidence to the past.
- Cost savings on building material: Adaptive reuse involves the refurbishment of existing building members, which tends to be a relatively labor-intensive process and relies less on purchasing and installing many new building materials.
- Cost savings on demolition: Demolition costs may range from 5% to 10% of the total cost of new construction. This expense is often overlooked by many building owners. Some urban areas have strict building safety regulations and may not allow the usage of a swinging ball and other more efficient demolition techniques. Under these circumstances or a desire to reuse and recycle materials from the existing structure, buildings must be deconstructed, which might be more expensive and often is more time-consuming.
- Saves time: The total time required to renovate an existing building is generally less than the time required to construct a comparable amount of floor space in an entirely new building. A major advantage of renovating an existing building is that a refurbished portion of the building becomes suitable for occupancy before completion of the whole project. This provides as a notable advantage for those worried about cash inflow or space shortages while the rest of the project undergoes construction.
- Decreased public and social costs: Urbanization and urban sprawl cause several harms to our planet and the society. Lack of adaptive reuse of existing built assets can lead to dislocation of residents, economic decline and disruption of community life, eventually leading to abandoned and obsolete neighborhoods. Buildings and the development around them soon become the heart of a community upon which people's life depends. Regular maintenance and reuse of existing structures can help communities avoid the trauma caused by dilapidation, abandonment and clearance. This can help reduce the dislocation of residents, economic decline and disruption of community life, eventually leading to abandoned and obsolete neighborhoods. Old buildings are often found in fully developed neighborhoods where public amenities like sewers, water lines, roads, etc. have already been established. Adaptive reuse means that governments and municipalities have less infrastructure to build and maintain. In a survey conducted by researcher Sheila Conejos, several architects, developers and building stakeholders were asked about their opinion on the social implications of adaptive reuse of existing buildings. Most respondents thought that adaptive reuse is important to the society because old buildings are critical to the image and history of a society. They agreed that historical buildings add to the aesthetics of a townscape and should be preserved and reused.
- Environmental benefits: Modern building systems have high life-cycle costs and operational energy costs associated with them whereas traditional masonry and stone buildings are more climate-responsive. A significant environmental benefit of reusing built assets is the retention of the original buildings "embodied energy" in the building materials. The adaptive reuse of existing buildings can be adopted to facilitate climate change mitigation and is generally considered the most sustainable approach to developing and using a building.

== Challenges ==
Building regulatory requirements and governance, financing, management, and complexities and uncertainties may present challenges to adaptive reuse. The most significant challenges of adaptive reuse of existing buildings include structural integrity issues, compliance with building code regulations, government anti-adaptive reuse policies, lack of awareness, high maintenance cost, uncertainties surrounding existing building information, lack of incentives, and lack of decision-making tools and stakeholder participation.

== Predicting successful reuse ==
According to Chusid's "urban ore" concept, existing buildings that are fast approaching dilapidation or disuse are a "mine of raw materials for new projects". Shen and Langston built upon Chusid's idea and said that "an even more effective solution than raw material recovery is adaptive reuse". They studied that "a huge focus on economic factors alone has led to the destruction of buildings well short of their physical lives". Shen and Langston developed an integrated model for the assessment of adaptive reuse potential (ARP model) in 2008 by comparing case studies of one urban and one non-urban setting. The basis of this model lies in that "opportunity rises and falls within the confines of a negative exponential decay function linked to a building's physical life expectancy".

According to their study, a building reaches its maximum potential for adaptive reuse at a point when the building's age and its useful life merge or meet. At this point, the building's adaptive reuse potential is either an upward curve or a downward curve which can determine whether the potential is high, medium or low. The adaptive reuse potential calculator establishes a "predicted useful life" of a building by considering a series of physical, economic, functional, technological, social, legal and political characteristics. These characteristics are used to derive an "annual obsolescence rate" and "environmental obsolescence". These outcomes are necessary to determine an optimum point at which adaptive reuse intervention should occur.

An algorithm based on a standard decay (negative exponential) curve produces an index of reuse potential (known as the ARP score) and is expressed as a percentage. This decay curve in buildings can be used to establish an ARP score, which is expressed in percentage. Cities can rank their existing buildings as per their adaptive reuse potential and this data can be used by government authorities at any point in time. An adaptive reuse score of 50% or above is considered high. A low ARP score is anything below 20%. Anything between that range is considered moderate. Shen and Langston devised this concept of ARP as "rising from zero to its maximum score at the point of its useful life, and then falling back to zero as it approaches physical life".

AdaptSTAR is a 2013 model to facilitate adaptive reuse projects and has also been shown to be a good predictor of a successful project along with the ARP model.

A 2023 literature review identified some key factors for whether an adaptive reuse project would be a success. Architectural factors include whether the project minimizes intervention in the character of the structure, that new elements are compatible with the building without trying to pretend to be old, whether the interventions can be easily modified or reversed, maintain aesthetics such as the beauty of aging characteristics of a building, embrace creativity in the use of space while remaining functional. Structural factors emphasize the importance of extending the lifespan of the building among other practical factors. Cultural factors focus on the ability of the building to contribute to a sense of place and community pride, attracting the interest of the community in participating in its new phase of life, while improving the quality of life of its users. Economic indicators of success include whether land values have increased as a result of the project, shortening the construction period, saving on material costs, and helping develop local craftsmen and restorers, any boosts for tourism, and whether the tangible and intangible benefits outweigh the costs. In addition to environmental and energy considerations, there are authenticity and historic factors, including being able to tell the story of important events, maintain the congruity of a historic streetscape, and identifying and prioritizing the preservation of the features with the most heritage value.

== Methodology ==
Adaptive reuse projects are, in many ways, different from conventional new construction projects and must be planned and managed differently.

=== Building condition assessment ===
Before starting an adaptive reuse project and even considering refurbishment, it is important that the condition of the existing building is thoroughly assessed. A condition assessment primarily inspects a building's structural integrity, roofing, masonry, plaster, wood-work, tiling and the mechanical, electrical and plumbing systems. The in-depth inspection of buildings can be expensive. Nevertheless, building condition assessment is critical to the success of an adaptive reuse project and must not be avoided at any cost because this expense is insignificant relative to the injury or loss of life that a building failure might cause. One logical reason, as explained by the American Society of Civil Engineers, is that even a very well constructed building could undergo serious deterioration and eventually failure, if proper maintenance is not performed in the operational phase of the building. The direct inspection of the structural system is required to a certain degree which is decided by the judgement of an experienced civil engineer.

Sometimes, built assets cannot be considered suitable for adaptive reuse, simply because of the constraints of their built form or the condition that they are in. Former jails and mid-1900s low-rise apartments that have low floor area ratios (FAR) and which may be in some of the cities' prime locations have tended to be seen as less profitable for adaptive reuse. According to Bullen and Love, the buildings of the 1960s and 1970s in Perth were badly constructed, used ineffective thermal insulation materials and details and have low suitability for adaptive reuse, while the built form of the 1980s was deemed to be engineered to specifications and could accommodate an adaptive reuse model.

=== Survey of neighborhoods ===
After identifying the stability and soundness of a building, it is important to survey the neighborhood to find the potential use and function of the adaptive reuse project for that segment of the market or region that the building owners wish to attract. In many cases, an adaptive reuse project might help stabilize a neighborhood which may be otherwise decaying or be at a threat of vandalism. This upward trend may create lucrative rent opportunities for building owners and dwellers of the neighborhood. This survey can be in the form of a physical inspection of the neighborhood and/or a detailed study of the zoning map of that region. Pedestrian activity, presence of sidewalks, street lights, benches and public parks and the presence of well-occupied shops and buildings can tell us a lot about neighborhoods. After the neighborhood has been established to be stable and safe and free of any infringing decay, the next step is to determine what amenities it has to offer in terms of roadways, public transportation, shopping and eating, hospitals, schools and libraries.

=== Financial considerations ===
The decision to reuse or demolish built assets is driven by economic considerations such as development costs, project costs, investment returns and market. The economic costs differ from project to project and a growing body of research suggests that adaptive reuse is often cost-effective than demolition and new construction. Adaptive reuse projects have the potential to work in phases or parts. A major advantage of renovating an existing building is that a refurbished portion of the building becomes suitable for occupancy before completion of the whole project. This provides as a huge advantage for private developers as it keeps the cash inflow while the rest of the project undergoes construction. Keeping in mind the conclusions from structural and architectural survey, neighborhood survey and marketing survey, a budget is prepared. Building owners or developers can approach any of the financing sources such as insurance companies, foundations and funds, savings banks, building loan societies, endowment funds, and real estate investment trusts.

According to Bullen and Love in 2011, the adaptive reuse decision making was fundamentally driven by a "desire for short-term profits". Building owners consider the life expectancy of built assets, their energy and environmental performance and the high operating costs which may appear due to poor mechanical equipment, services, building materials and construction. Developers saw a thorough potential in saving groundwork and excavation costs by using an adaptive reuse model for their property. Additionally, they thought that "in Central Business District locations, built assets are an attractive investment option for reuse projects, as premium prices and rents can be obtained for an office space". The highest rents often go to remodeled buildings with "high-quality finishes" and good aesthetics that are not too expensive to operate and maintain.

Governments sometimes provide support and incentives for adaptive reuse of built assets. This could include flexibility in the building codes and more plot ratio bonuses among other ways of encouraging innovative adaptive reuse designs. The existing building codes and regulations for fire safety and building access to people with disabilities can make it difficult to adaptively reuse some older buildings. Tax incentives or grants from governments on donors also make adaptive reuse more viable when available. The United States' National Historic Preservation Act of 1966, for example, established matching grants-in-aid, obtained through state historic preservation offices, that can be used for the acquisition and restoration of properties listed in the National Register of Historic Places.

=== Architect's contract ===
In most adaptive reuse projects, it is the architect who is the leader with the imagination of how an abandoned warehouse can become an office building or an abandoned hospital a condominium. Since the architect has a deep involvement in the success of a project, they must perform their work under a clearly defined contract. Under this contract, the architect and the owner are under the obligation of the contract and must abide by it. Progress of design, site visits and evaluation are some of the basic actions that the architect performs under this contract. There are different types of contracts, ranging from a fixed fee contract, percentage of construction cost contract and fee plus expenses contract. All stakeholders may collectively decide on the most suitable type of contract for the project.

=== Detailed study of structure ===
Before the architect and engineer begin the final designing for the building, they make a thorough structural, mechanical and architectural survey of the existing building.

==== Foundation and basement ====
The architect and engineer may look for signs of cracking of masonry wall or the settling of basement floors or upper floors which direct them to a problem in the foundation. These signs can also be detected from window sills and cornices. Appropriate survey instruments such as plumb bobs and spirit levels are recommended for use instead of a naked eye inspection. If the problem seems too severe, a test boring may reveal the cause of the problem. Additionally, the building code should be examined for fireproofing requirements.

==== Structural system ====
Analyzing the structural strength requires expertise and is one of the most crucial in terms of occupant safety. On-site inspection along with a study of existing floor plans can help engineers determine the structural stability. In some case, when the building drawings may not be available, engineers may have to scrape off the plaster to reveal the underlying structure. Wooden members of the structural system should be especially checked for rot or termite infestation. Iron or steel must be checked for corrosion and loose bearings or bolting. Additional future dead and live loads must be kept in mind while designing with the structural strength of the existing building.

==== Floor system ====
The floor system in old buildings is usually strong enough to satisfy present codes. If not, additional supporting members may be necessary. The floor and ceiling height should be able to accommodate additional stairways, vertical plumbing, electrical and HVAC. In some cases, an elevator may have to be installed.

==== Exterior walls ====
The building envelope should be examined thoroughly for cracks, watertightness (infiltration or leaks) and mortar joints. It is important to examine these exterior walls for future fenestration and air conditioning ducts.

==== Roof and waterproofing ====
Older building roofing systems generally comprise the roof, parapets and cornices. Projecting metal cornices are subject to corrosion. Parapets may be subject to cracks and degrading mortar joints. A careful examination of the top-floor ceiling may reveal water leakage.

==== Stairways and exits ====
The stairway requirement for a building should be derived from present-day building codes for fire and safety. Strategic placement of new staircases and layout for maximum access should be done in order to maximize space utility and minimize the burden on the structural system.

=== Designing to save energy ===
Redesigning the existing building for new use must accommodate energy conservation strategies. Some of the most important methods of energy conservation are, reducing heating and cooling loads through building envelopes, maximizing natural ventilation potential, using daylighting and energy efficient lighting fixtures.

A building's envelope protects it from the external weather conditions. An exposed roof is the greatest source of heat loss during cold months and heat gains during hot months. Roof insulation can help with extreme climate conditions. If the bottom floor is a concrete floor slab on grade or built over a crawl space, insulation should be considered. The fenestration in an external wall assembly are often the biggest sources of energy losses through conduction, radiation and infiltration. Green building rating systems often focus more on energy consumption of buildings than other sustainable outcomes such as the recycling of building materials, reduced energy and water consumption off-site and reduced environmental impacts like global warming potential, lake eutrophication potential and ozone layer depletion.

== Disassembly sequence planning ==
Building owners and developers can take the potential advantage of adaptive reuse by taking away components from unused buildings and then repair, reuse or recycle its constituent parts. Disassembly is a form of recovering target products and plays a key role to maximize the efficiency of an adaptive reuse project. This disassembly planning sequence aims to reduce the environmental impacts caused due to demolition using a "rule-base recursive analysis system" with practical and viable solutions.

== By location ==
=== Americas ===
==== Canada ====
As a comparatively young country, adaptive reuse is not the norm in Canada, where redevelopment has typically meant demolition and building anew. Calgary and Edmonton are particularly known for their pro-demolition culture, but they are not unique in this regard. However, since the 1990s, adaptive use has gained traction. The conversion of former railway-centred warehouse districts to residential and commercial uses has occurred in Edmonton, Calgary, Saskatoon, Regina, and Winnipeg. In 2025, the planned demolition of the old Provincial Museum Building in Edmonton was cancelled amid community opposition with the government soliciting proposals for potential adaptive reuse of the building. In Calgary, a city program to transform vacant office towers to apartments launched in 2021 had supported the construction of 2,450 apartments in the city's downtown neighbourhood as of 2025, including in the former Petrofina building.

Other noted adaptive reuse projects in the 2010s have included the Laurentian School of Architecture in Sudbury, which is incorporating several historic buildings in the city's downtown core into its new campus, similar to the downtown campus of NSCAD University in Halifax, and Mill Square in Sault Ste. Marie, an ongoing project to convert the derelict St. Mary's Paper mill into a mixed-use cultural and tourism hub.

==== United States ====
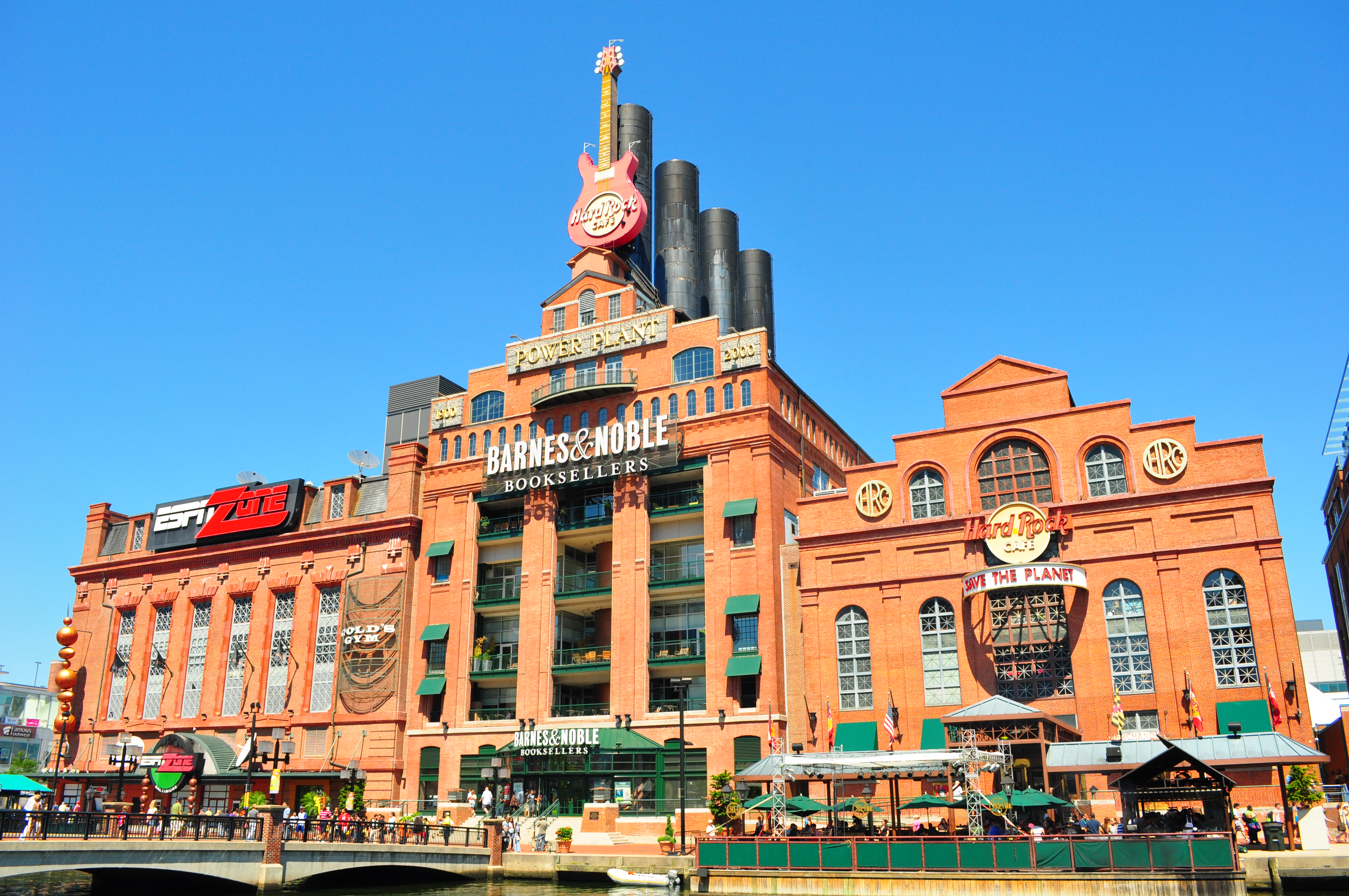
Pratt Street Power Plant in Baltimore, Maryland, United States, converted into retail, restaurants, and offices.

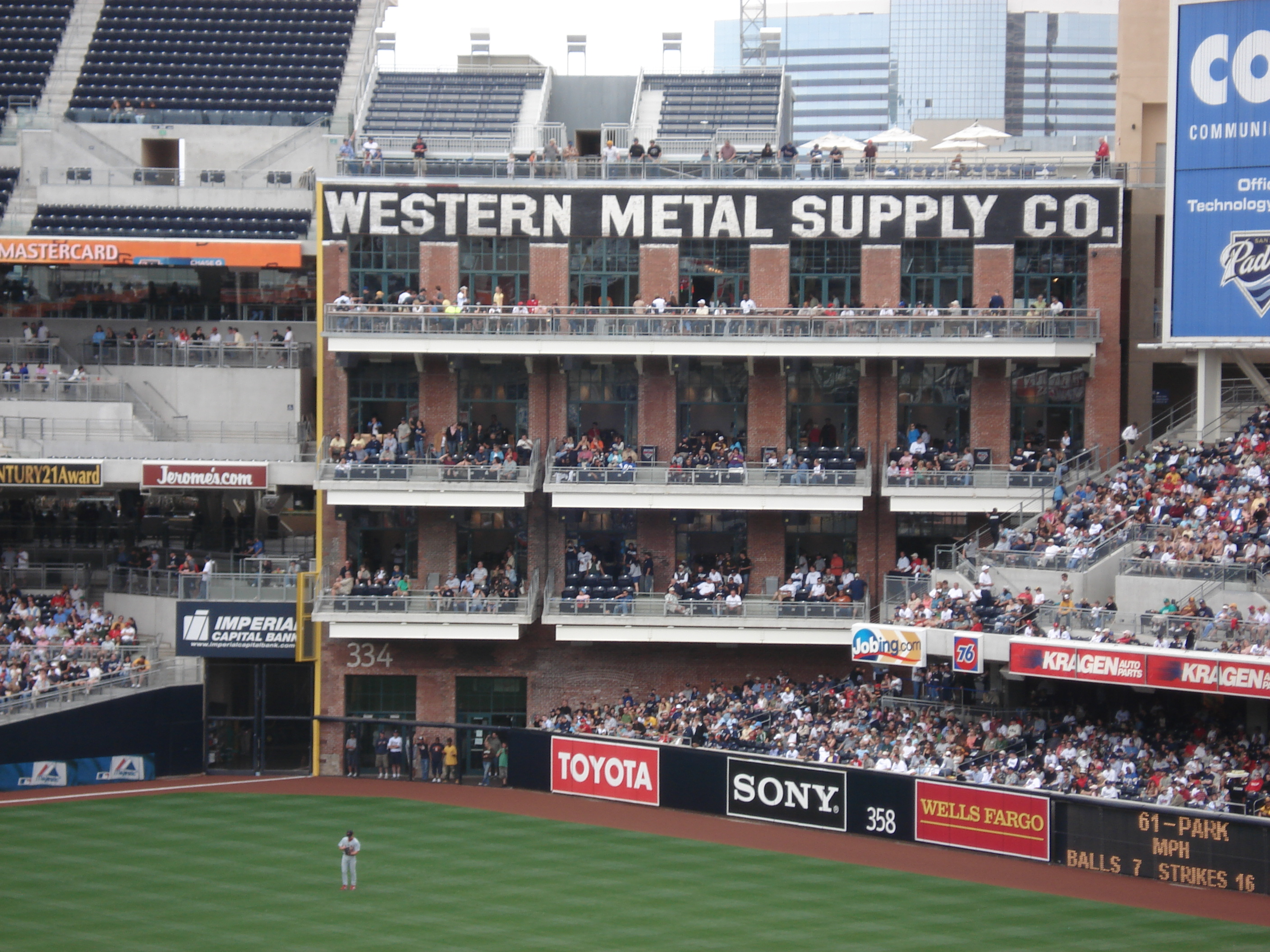
The Western Metal Building as seen during a game at Petco Park.

Urban waterfronts, historically used as points for industrial production and transport, became popular as residences and mixed use. The greatest value of the adaptive use movement is characterized by the hundreds of abandoned schools, factories, hotels, warehouses and military posts that have been adapted for use as affordable housing, office buildings, as well as commercial, civic, educational and recreational centers.

Ghirardelli Square in San Francisco was the first festival marketplace project in the United States, opening in 1964.

Another notable example is the High Line in New York City, where a former elevated freight rail line was converted into a 1.45-mile-long public park. Its adaptive reuse preserves industrial features while offering green space, public art, and city views.

Notable American museums adapted from defunct factories include the Massachusetts Museum of Contemporary Art (MassMOCA) in North Adams; the Watermill Center in Water Mill, New York; and The Dia Art Foundation Museum (Dia:Beacon) in Beacon, New York.

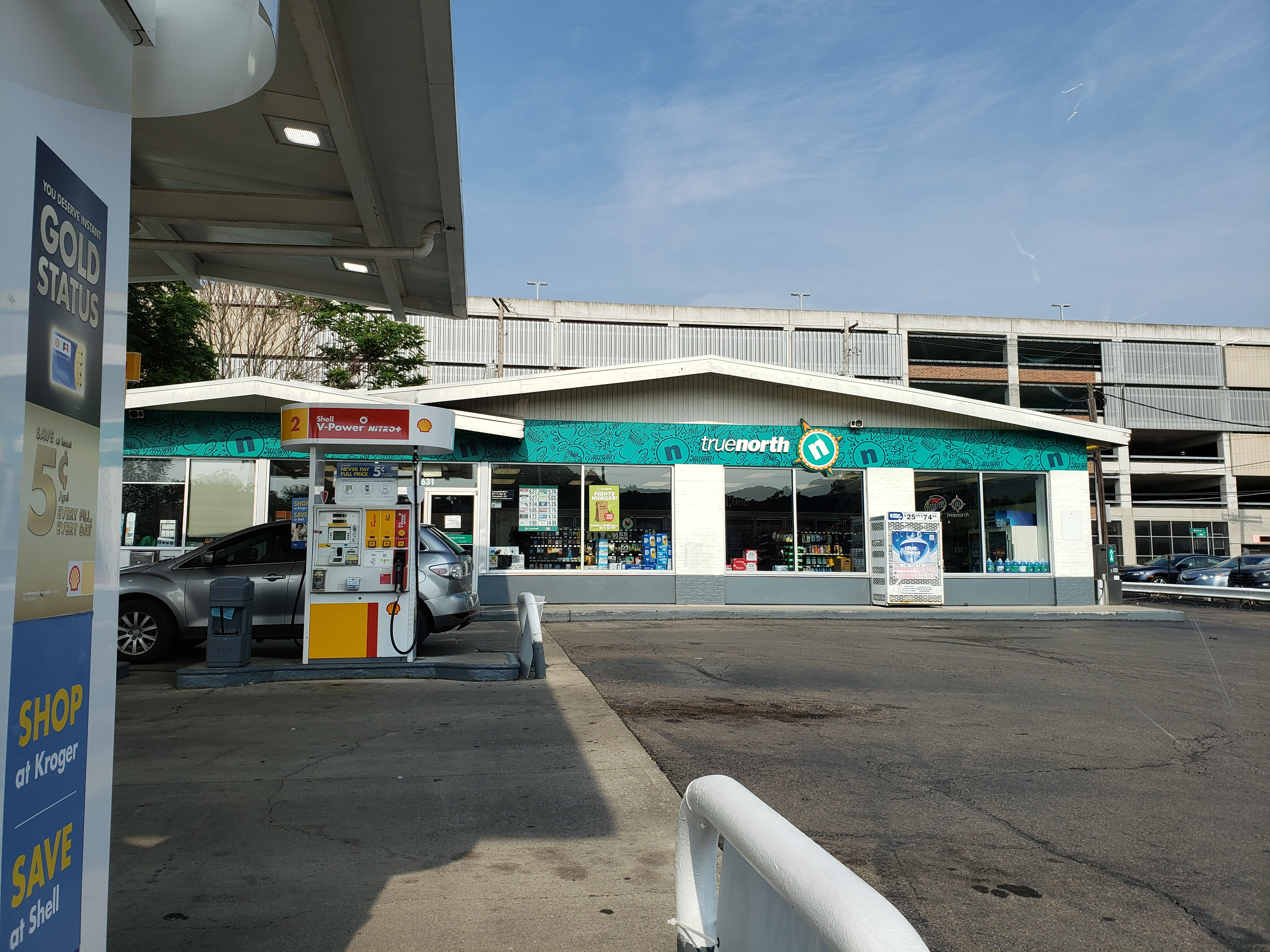
A Shell station in Columbus, Ohio in 2020. The building, which formerly housed a service station, was converted into a convenience store.

Throughout the United States until the 1970s, the vast majority of gas stations also offered mechanical work. Converting the service bays into a convenience store in the 1980s and 1990s was common while still selling fuel. Many others stopped selling fuel and became shops or offices.

Office-to-residential conversions are also common in the United States with office blocks in New York City, Washington, DC, and San Francisco slated for conversion to reduce the stock of vacant office blocks while addressing a housing shortage. Adaptive reuse has been identified as a viable solution to the U.S. affordable housing crisis, particularly in urban areas.

=== Australia ===
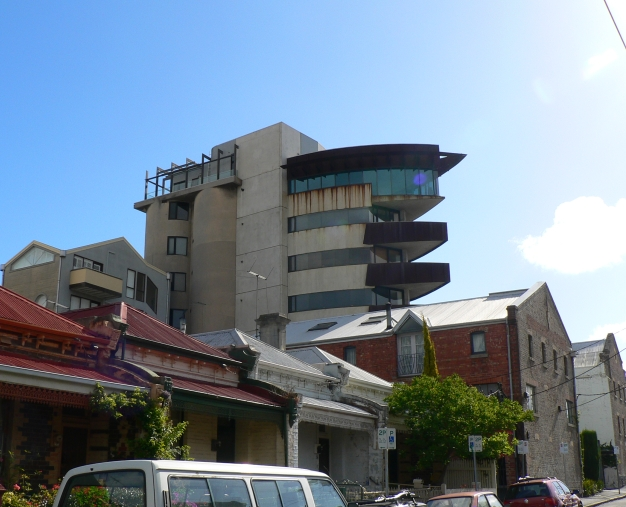
The Malthouse apartments in Richmond, Melbourne, Australia is a conversion of a former grain silo by Nonda Katsalidis.

In Australia, there have been a number of adaptive reuse projects as the main cities have turned from industrial areas into areas of high value and business areas. In Sydney, sites such as the old Sydney Mint have been renovated and adapted into inner-city headquarters for the Historic Houses Trust of New South Wales. The movement of the city from an industrial, working class area into a gentrified area with high home prices has helped a number of adaptive reuse sites to exist within such an area. The old Hyde Park Barracks building has also been transformed from an old jail into a museum which documents and records the history of Australia's first settlers and convicts.

The industrial history of Australia has also been an influencing factor in determining the types of buildings and areas which have gone on to become adaptive reuse sites, especially in the realms of private residences and community based buildings. Some such sites include, Nonda Katsalidis' Malthouse apartments in Richmond, a conversion of a former grain silo and the South Australian site of the Balhannah Mines which was adapted into a private residence and has received awards from the Housing Industry Association and the Design Institute of Australia. The former Adelaide Stock Exchange building was purchased, restored and adapted to become the Science Exchange for the Royal Institution of Australia and the Australian Science Media Centre.

=== Europe ===
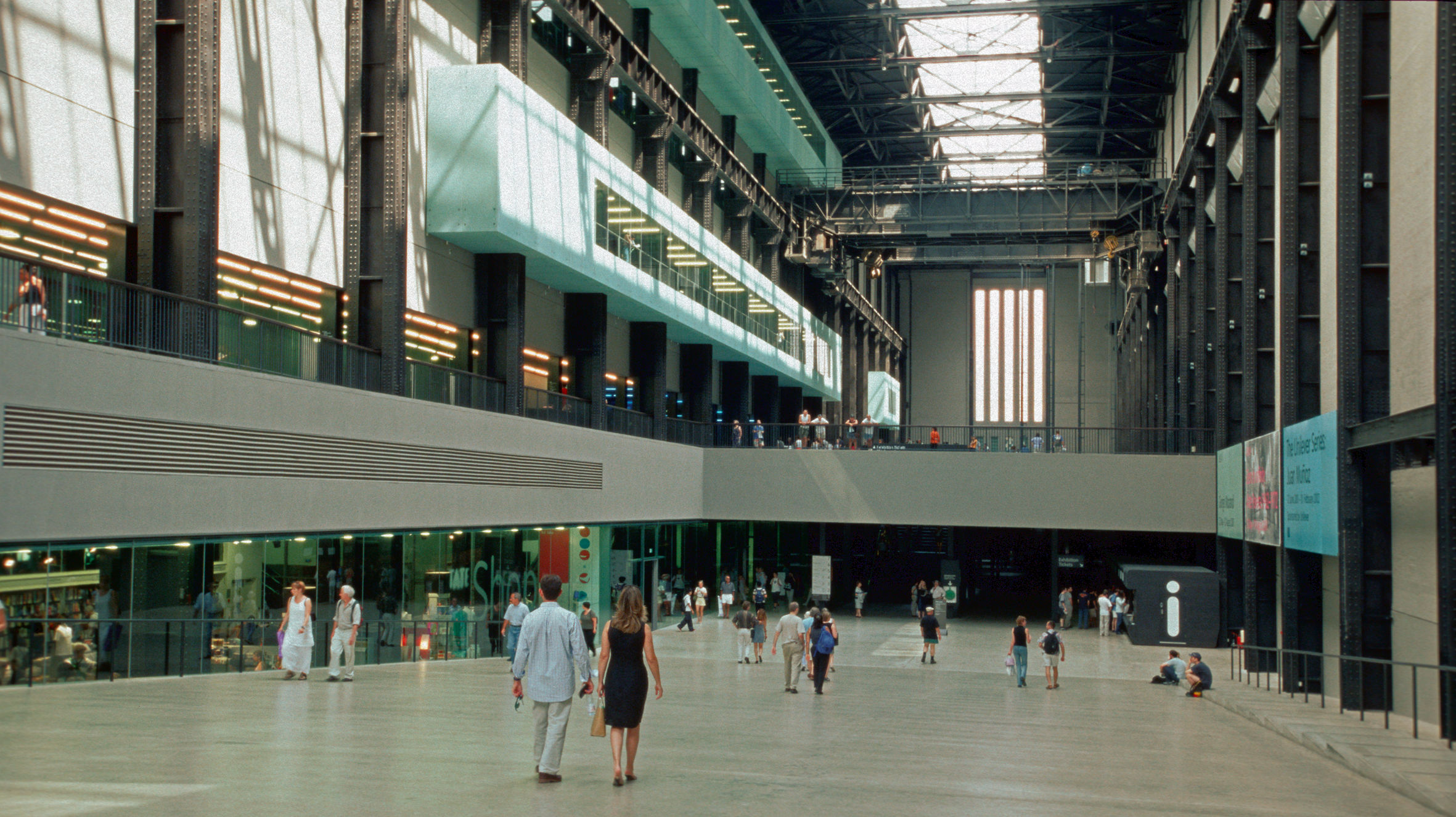
The Bankside Power Station in London was converted for use as the Tate Modern. Shown is the former turbine hall, used to house exhibits.

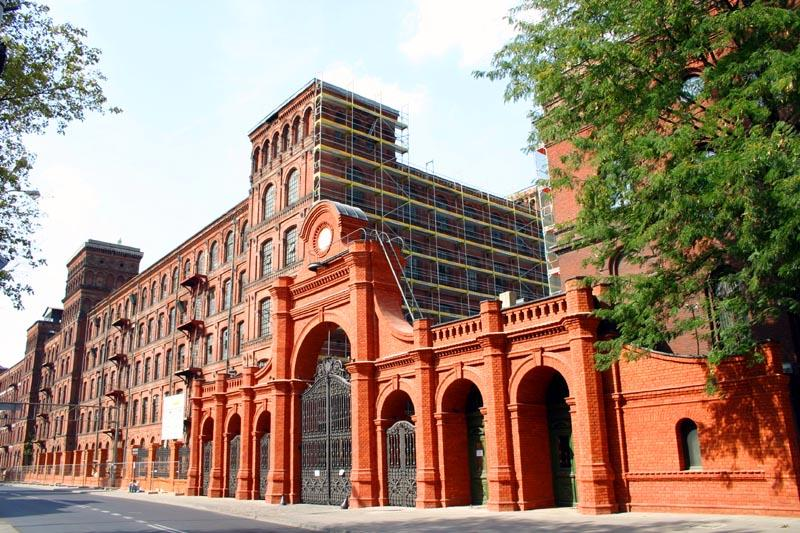
One of the entrances to Manufaktura in Łódź, Poland

In Europe, the main forms of adaptive reuse have been around former palaces and unused residences of the different European royal families into publicly accessible galleries and museums. Many of the spaces have been restored with period finishes and display different collections of art, and design. In Paris, France, the most famous example of adaptive reuse is the Musée du Louvre, a former palace built in the late 12th century under Philip II and opened to the public as a museum in 1793. Also, in London, England, the Queen's House, a former royal residence built between 1616 and 1635, has become part of the National Maritime Museum and houses the museum's fine art collection.

London is also home to many office-to-homes conversions following a March 2024 relaxation of planning rules to facilitate such conversions. As of January 2025, 121,000 flats were created in England under "permitted development rights" (PDR) which allows developers to convert commercial buildings without full planning consent and no affordable housing requirement.

Other famous adaptive reuse sites in Europe include the Maastricht branch of the Selexyz chain in the Netherlands. This project received 2007 Lensvelt de Architect interior design award for its innovative reuse and is number one on The Guardian's worldwide top ten bookstores list.

=== Asia ===
==== Taiwan ====
In Taichung, Dawn Cake bought the former ophthalmology hospital and converted it into a restaurant.

== Types of adaptive reuse interventions ==
- Historic preservation
- Renovation
- Facadism
- Integration
- Infrastructure reuse

== See also ==
- Architectural conservation
- Conservation-restoration of cultural heritage
- Fix it First
- Mill conversion
- Right to repair
- Wabi-sabi
- World Heritage Sites
