= Elveden Centre =

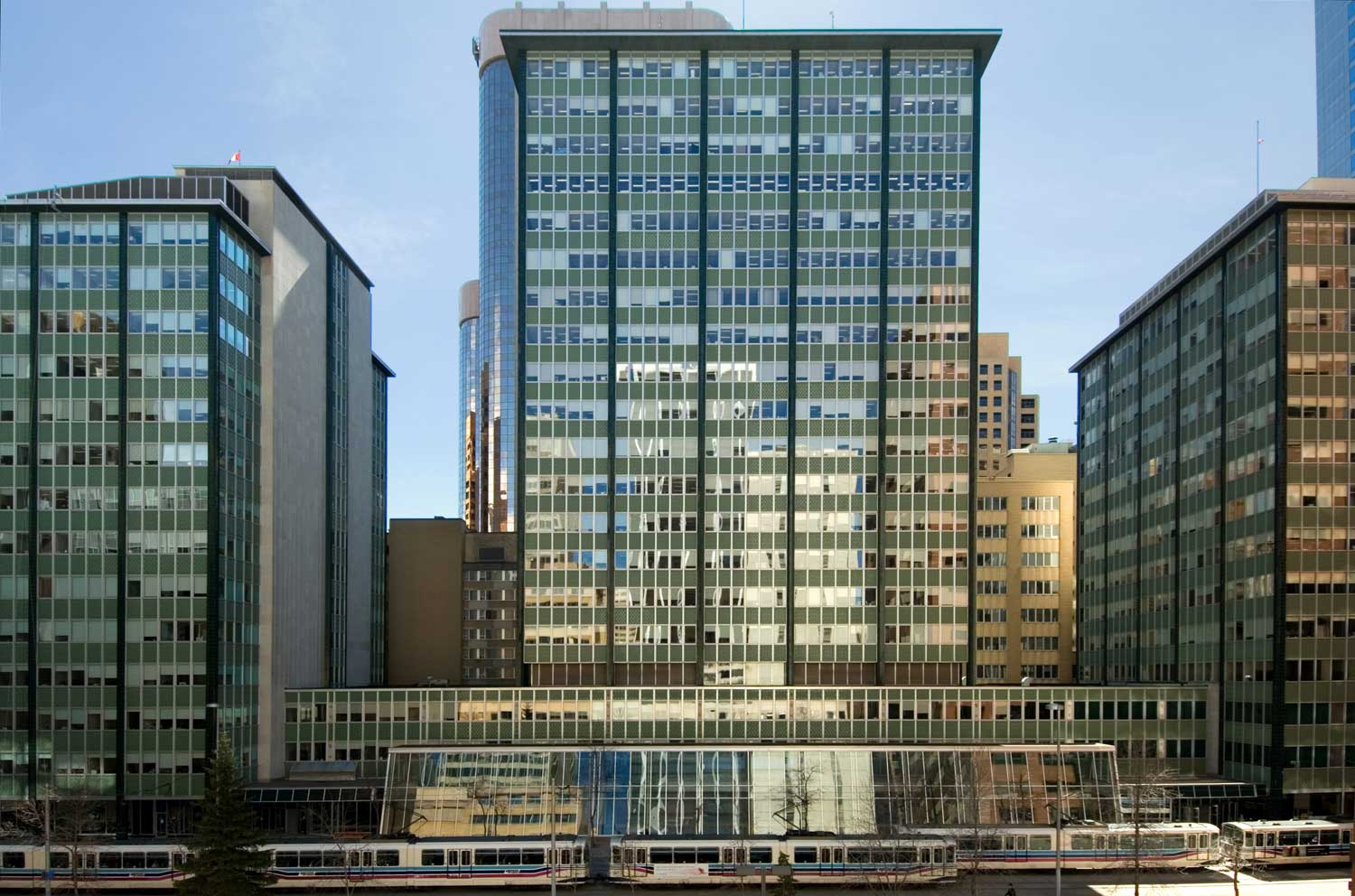
- Elveden Centre

General information
- Type: Office
- Location: Calgary; Canada, 707, 717 and 727 7th Avenue Southwest
- Coordinates: 51°02′49″N 114°04′46″W
- Construction started: 1959
- Completed: 1960 (Elveden House); 1962 (Iveagh House); 1964 (Guinness House)
- Cost: $14,500,000

Height
- Roof: 263 ft (80 m)

Technical details
- Floor count: 20
- Floor area: 447,814 ft^{2} (41,603.3 m^{2})

Design and construction
- Architects: Rule, Wynn, Rule
- Main contractor: Commonwealth Construction

Elveden Centre is a three-tower office complex located at 707, 717 and 727 7th Avenue Southwest in Calgary, Alberta. Designed by Alberta architectural firm Rule Wynn and Rule and built in three phases between 1959 and 1964, it is an example of International-style architecture. Architectural critic Trevor Boddy identified the complex as an exception to the cheaply clad, derivative buildings of Alberta's building boom, noting its careful detailing and unified design.

== History and design ==
The discovery of oil at Leduc No. 1 in 1947 was followed by a period of office construction in Calgary, which was already a centre for Alberta's oil industry. The Barron Building, completed in 1951, helped shift commercial development westward from the city's established downtown core. Other office buildings constructed during this period included the Petro Chemical Building (1956) and the Petro-Fina Building (1959).

Elveden Centre was commissioned by British Pacific Building, a company owned by the Guinness family. The project formed part of a longer history of Canadian property investment by the family, including earlier ventures by brothers Rupert and Walter Guinness, the latter assassinated in 1944. Other Guinness-backed developments included the British Properties residential neighbourhood in West Vancouver, the Lions Gate Bridge, completed in the late 1930s, and the Park Royal Shopping Centre, opened in 1950. The family at that time had interests in the Calgary companies Duke Drilling Investment Company and Seabridge Investments. Rule Wynn and Rule was hired for the project.

A 1988 history published by Rule Wynn and Rule's successor firm recounts how Dave Russell, a member of its drafting staff who later became Alberta's deputy premier, "looked down from the drafting room window to see a long black limousine draw up". Its passenger was Lady Patricia Guinness, who had travelled from Ireland to inspect the plans for Elveden House. She was pleased with plywood mock-ups showing the proposed placement of the family's emblems above the first storey. The decorative features, designed by associate architect Charles Payne, combined basket-weave steel and porcelain.

A September 1962 Calgary Herald photograph showed Viscount Elveden examining a red-and-gold wild boar emblem displayed in the lobby of Elveden House. The caption identified the boar as the Guinness family's trademark and noted that it surmounted the family's coat of arms. The first of the Guinness family's heraldic crests was described in the 1909 edition of Burke's Peerage as "a boar passant quarterly or and gu"—a walking boar with its body divided into four quarters of alternating gold and red.

Construction, done by the Commonwealth Construction Company, began in 1959. Steel was provided by the Dominion Bridge Company. For the project to proceed, the City of Calgary had to amend a restriction that limited buildings to twelve storeys.

The first and central tower, Elveden House, was built between 1959 and 1960. It was named after Viscount Elveden, the courtesy title then held by Benjamin Guinness, heir to the Earl of Iveagh. The title derived from the Guinness family's Elveden estate in Suffolk. The second tower, Iveagh House, on the east side, was built between 1960 and 1962. The third tower, Guinness House, on the west side, was built between 1962 and 1964.

According to property manager Estancia Investments, Elveden Centre has 447,814 ft^{2} (41,603.3 m^{2}) of rentable floor area; Elveden House, the central tower, measures 172,140 ft^{2} (15,992 m^{2}).

Mosaic panel depicting a harp and a boar

In his 1987 study of modern architecture in Alberta, architectural critic Trevor Boddy contrasted Elveden Centre with the inexpensive cladding and derivative designs common during the province's building boom. Although he suggested that tastes at the time might question the towers' "lurid green fibreglass spandrel panels", Boddy described the three towers and their shared podium as a unified design, with careful attention to the elevations, interiors and massing. He also identified a recurring hexagonal motif on the spandrels, pedestrian canopies, lobby walls and light diffuser boxes, and interpreted the cladding colour and mosaics depicting harps and angels as references to the Guinness family's Irish origins.

On 22 September 2005, Elveden Centre was added to the City of Calgary's Inventory of Evaluated Historic Resources. The inventory lists the complex as having no legal protection at the federal, provincial or municipal level.
