= Rona Murray =

Canadian poet

Rona Jean Murray (February 10, 1924, London, England – July 9, 2003, Victoria, British Columbia, Canada) was a Canadian poet.

== Life ==
Murray spent her early childhood in India, where her father commanded a Gurkha regiment. When she was eight years old her family immigrated to Canada in 1932.

Rona attended Queen Margaret's School from 1932 to 1941. She studied at Mills College, and later graduated from the University of British Columbia and the University of Kent, where she earned a Ph.D.

She taught at Douglas College, Selkirk College, Castlegar, University of Victoria, and University of British Columbia.

In 1944 Murray married Gerry Haddon and had three children; they divorced. She later married ceramics artist Walter Dexter. They lived on Vancouver Island.

Her papers are held at University of Victoria.

== Awards ==
Rona Murray has been granted the following awards,

- 1984 Ethel Wilson B.C. Fiction Award, Shortlisted, for The Indigo Dress and Other Stories
- 1982 Pat Lowther Award for Journey
- 1965 Norma Epstein National Award for Creative Writing, for The Enchanted Adder
- 1964 Macmillan of Canada Creative Writing Award, for The Enchanted Adder
- 1958 B.C. Centennial One-Act Play Award, for Blue Duck's Feather and Eagledown

== Works ==
=== Poetry ===
- The Enchanted Adder (1965)
- The Power of the Dog. Morriss Print. Co. 1968.
- Selected Poems. Sono Nis Press. 1974. ISBN 978-0-919462-11-3.
- Ootischenie. Fiddlehead Poetry Books. 1974. ISBN 978-0-919197-44-2.
- Journey. Sono Nis Press. 1981. ISBN 978-0-919462-75-5.
- Adam and Eve in Middle Age. Sono Nis Press. 1984. ISBN 0-919203-52-3.

=== Plays ===
- Blue Duck's Feather and Eagledown was performed in the 1958 Centennial celebrations of British Columbia,

=== Anthologies ===
- Rosemary Sullivan, ed. (1989). Poetry by Canadian women. Oxford University Press. ISBN 978-0-19-540688-7.

=== Editor ===
- Rona Murray; Walter Dexter, eds. (1979). The Art of earth: an anthology. Sono Nis Press. ISBN 978-0-919462-86-1.
- Rona Murray; Garry McKevitt, eds. (2000). Love & pomegranates: an anthology of short fiction. Sono Nis Press. ISBN 978-1-55039-108-4.
- Rona Murray, ed. (1998). Threshold: six women, six poets. Sono Nis Press. ISBN 978-1-55039-092-6.

=== Non fiction ===
- The Art of Earth, Rona Murray and Walter Dexter.
